= China–United States relations =

- China: United States

Diplomatic mission
- Chinese Embassy, Washington, D.C.: United States Embassy, Beijing

Envoy
- Ambassador Xie Feng: Ambassador David Perdue

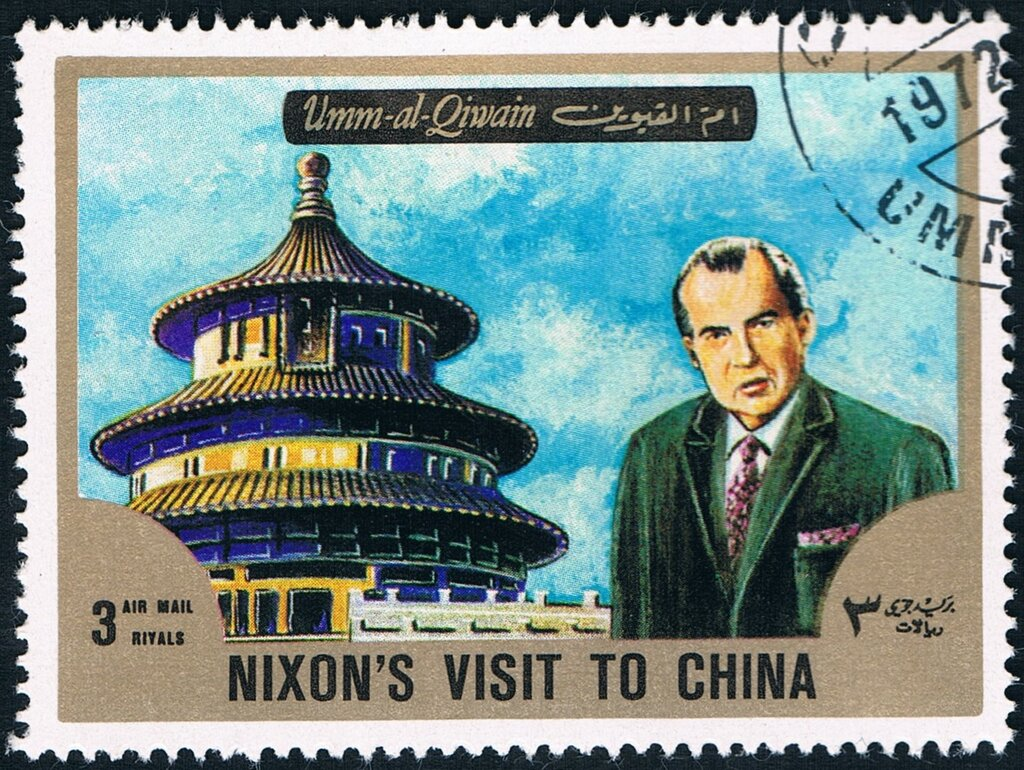
President Nixon's 1972 visit to China

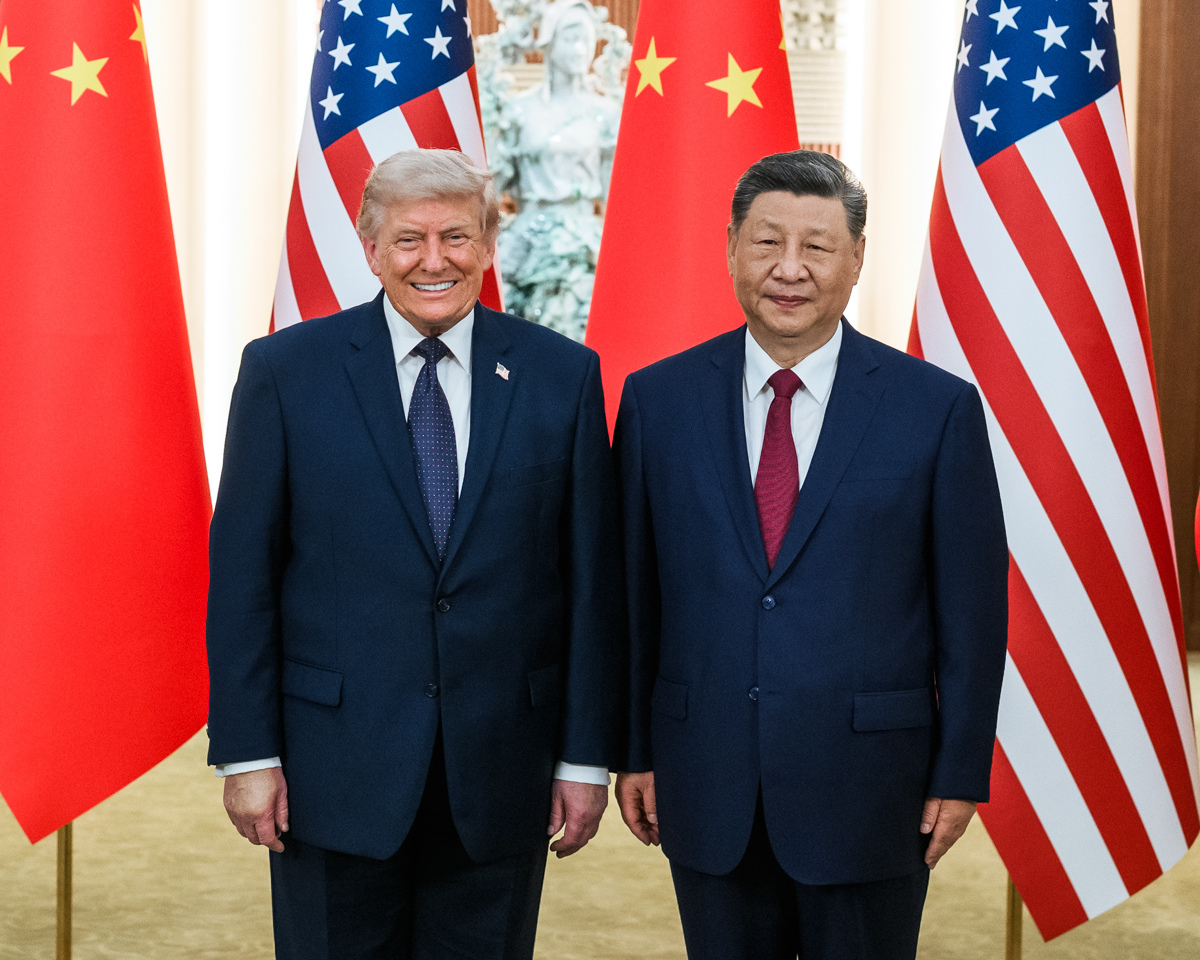
US president Donald Trump and Chinese leader Xi Jinping at the Great Hall of the People during Trump's state visit to China in May 2026

US president Trump and Xi at the White House during Xi's state visit to the United States in September 2026

The relationship between the People's Republic of China (PRC) and the United States (US) has been complex and at times tense since the establishment of the PRC on 1 October 1949 and the subsequent retreat of the government of the Republic of China to Taiwan. After the normalization of relations in the 1970s, the US–China relationship has been marked by persistent disputes including China's economic policies, the political status of Taiwan and territorial disputes in the South China Sea. Despite these tensions, the two nations have significant economic ties and are deeply interconnected, while also engaging in strategic competition on the global stage. As of 2025, the US and China are the world's largest and second-largest economies by nominal GDP. Collectively, they account for 44.2% of the global nominal GDP. The two countries describe their relationship as a constructive strategic and stable relationship.

The proclamation of the PRC in Beijing by the Chinese Communist Party (CCP) chairman Mao Zedong created a new central government on the mainland in October 1949. Relations between the US and the new Chinese government quickly soured, culminating in direct conflict during the Korean War. The US-led United Nations intervention was met with Chinese military involvement, as China sent millions of soldiers to prevent a US-aligned presence on its border. For decades, the US did not formally recognize the PRC, instead maintaining diplomatic relations with the Republic of China (ROC) based in Taiwan, and as such blocked the PRC's entry into the United Nations. However, shifting geopolitical dynamics, including the Sino-Soviet split, the winding down of the Vietnam War, as well as of the Cultural Revolution, paved the way for US president Richard Nixon's 1972 visit to China, ultimately marking a sea change in US–China relations. On 1 January 1979, the US formally established diplomatic relations with the PRC and recognized it as the sole legitimate government of China, while maintaining unofficial ties with Taiwan via the Taiwan Relations Act, which endures as a major point of contention.

Every US president since Nixon has toured China during his term in office, with the exception of Jimmy Carter and Joe Biden. The two countries cooperated with each other against the Soviet Union. Following China's reform and opening up, the trade between the two countries significantly increased starting from the 1980s. The US gave China the most favored nation designation in 1980, renewing it annually until Congress granted China permanent normal trade relations in 2000, effective on China's accession to the World Trade Organization in December 2001. The Obama administration signed a record number of bilateral agreements with China, particularly regarding climate change, though its Pivot to Asia created diplomatic friction.

Relations worsened during the 2010s over concerns including China's militarization of the South China Sea and Chinese espionage in the United States, leading observers to speculate a Second Cold War between the two powers. In 2018, President Donald Trump launched a trade war with China. The relationship further deteriorated during the COVID-19 pandemic. In January 2021, the US officially classified the Chinese government's treatment of the Uyghurs in Xinjiang as a genocide. Tensions remained high during the presidency of Joe Biden from 2021. His foreign policy prioritized strategic competition with China, imposed export controls on semiconductors to China, boosted regional alliances against China, and expanded support for Taiwan. However, the administration also emphasized that the US sought "competition, not conflict". The second Trump administration's relations with China have been marked by inconsistency. From 2025, the administration sharply escalated the trade war with China, raising tariffs, prior to negotiating with China on a reduction in the tariff rate. The Trump administration has emphasized economic competition over ideological conflicts, and has downplayed the topic of human rights.

== History ==
The People's Republic of China (PRC) was founded on 1 October 1949.

=== Korean War ===
On 25 June 1950, the China-aligned state of North Korea invaded US-aligned South Korea. In response, the United Nations Security Council (UNSC) adopted two resolutions, including Resolution 82 on 25 June 1950, calling for North Korea to withdraw its forces, and Resolution 83 on 27 June, recommending that UN members assist South Korea in repelling the attack.

Initially, the US government saw Chinese intervention as unlikely. The People's Republic was barely a year old and it appeared that, if China was going to engage in warfare, it would be in the Kuomintang-controlled Taiwan, not Korea. The US was opposed to the PRC's interests in Taiwan and, within two days of North Korea invading the South, US forces were deployed to the Taiwan Strait.

After their defeat in the Chinese Civil War, parts of the ROC army had retreated to Burma. The US supported these ROC forces with the hope that they would harass the PRC from the southwest, thereby diverting Chinese resources from the Korean War.

It seemed to the new Chinese leadership that stopping American encroachment into Asia was an important issue. In a speech to the Politburo of the Chinese Communist Party in August 1950, Chairman Mao Zedong stated, "if the American imperialists are victorious, they will become dizzy with success, and then be in a position to threaten us." PRC premier and foreign minister Zhou Enlai echoed this sentiment in a speech in September: "the Chinese people can never tolerate foreign invasion, nor allow the imperialist to invade our neighbour at will without response". Chinese leadership could not tolerate an American-occupied state directly on its border: Zhou Enlai warned that China would intervene in the war on national security grounds; this warning was dismissed by US president Harry S. Truman.

On 30 September 1950, the UN offensive under the direction of the US crossed the 38th parallel into North Korea. Kim Il-Sung held an emergency meeting with Chinese officials, appealing for their urgent entry into the conflict. The UN authorized the reunification of Korea, meaning that the entire peninsula could fall into US control. On 19 October 1950, Chinese forces crossed into North Korea.

In response to the PRC's entry into the conflict, the US froze all Chinese assets in America and banned American citizens from traveling to the PRC. The PRC seized all American assets and properties and began efforts to remove American cultural influence from China, including by nationalizing cultural institutions affiliated with the US.

In late October 1950, China began its intervention with the Battle of Onjong. During the Battle of the Ch'ongch'on River, the People's Volunteer Army outflanked the UN forces, leading to the defeat of the US Eighth Army. A ceasefire presented by the UN to the PRC shortly after Ch'ongch'on River, on 11 December it was rejected by the Chinese, who were now convinced of their ability to defeat the UN forces, and wanted to demonstrate China's military power by driving them out of Korea altogether. The Chinese achieved further victory at the Third Battle of Seoul and the Battle of Hoengsong, but UN forces recovered, pushing the front back to lands around the 38th parallel by July. A stalemate followed. Even though the US Air Force would spend the entire war with total air supremacy, the strategic impasse ultimately lasted until the Korean Armistice Agreement that ended the fighting was signed on 27 July 1953. Since then, a divided Korea has continued to feature in US–China relations, with large American forces still stationed in the South.

In 1952, in the midst of the Korean War, the American army surveyed Chinese prisoners of war (POWs) asking them why they believed the PRC was involved in the conflict. Of 238 respondents, 60% agreed it was for the defense of China against the US, while only 17% said it was to defend North Korea.

=== Vietnam War ===
The People's Republic of China dispatched advisers and military aid to the communist Viet Minh from 1950 during the First Indochina War, viewing this as part of its national defense strategy against the United States and the West. China continued to provide weapons and training to North Vietnam during the Second Indochina War, and in the summer of 1962, Mao agreed to supply Hanoi with 90,000 rifles and guns free of charge. After the launch of America's Operation Rolling Thunder in 1965, China sent anti-aircraft units and engineering battalions to North Vietnam to repair the damage caused by American bombing, rebuild roads and railroads, and perform other engineering work, freeing additional hundreds of thousands North Vietnamese Army units for combat against American and South Vietnamese forces.

The Chinese presence in North Vietnam was well known to US officials, which contributed to President Lyndon B. Johnson and Secretary of Defense Robert McNamara's decision not to invade North Vietnam, favoring a strategy of supporting South Vietnam in defending itself instead. The possibility of direct Chinese intervention was also ambiguous throughout the course of the war. Mao Zedong reportedly told journalist Edgar Snow in 1965 that China had no intention of fighting to save the Hanoi regime and would not engage the US military unless it crossed into Chinese territory. US troops ultimately exited Vietnam as domestic opposition to American deployment in Vietnam increased, ending US involvement in the Vietnam War.

=== Freezing of relations (1949–1971) ===
Between 1949 and 1971, US–China relations were uniformly hostile, with frequent propaganda attacks in both directions. At the 1954 Geneva Conference, US Secretary of State John Foster Dulles forbade any contact with the Chinese delegation, refusing to shake hands with Zhou Enlai, the lead Chinese negotiator. Relations deteriorated further under President John F. Kennedy (1961–1963). Before the Cuban Missile Crisis, policymakers in Washington were uncertain whether or not China would break with the Soviet Union on the basis of ideology, national ambitions, and readiness for a role in guiding communist activities in many countries. New insight came with the Sino-Indian border war in November 1962 and Beijing's response to the Cuban Missile Crisis. Kennedy administration officials concluded that China was more militant and more dangerous than the Soviet Union, making better relations with Moscow desirable, with both nations trying to contain Chinese ambitions. Diplomatic recognition of China remained out of the question, as a crucial veto power on the UN Security Council was held by America's ally on Taiwan. The US continued to work to prevent the PRC from taking China's seat in the United Nations and encouraged its allies not to deal with the PRC. The United States placed an embargo on trading with the PRC, and encouraged allies to follow it.

The PRC developed nuclear weapons in 1964 and, as later declassified documents revealed, President Johnson considered preemptive attacks to halt its nuclear program. He ultimately decided the measure carried too much risk, and it was abandoned. Instead, Johnson looked for ways to improve relations. The American public seemed more open to the idea of expanding contacts with China, such as the relaxation of the trade embargo. But the War in Vietnam was raging, with China aiding North Vietnam. Mao's Great Leap Forward had failed in its goal to properly industrialize China and sparked a famine, and his Cultural Revolution exercised hostility to the US. In the end, Johnson made no move to change the standoff.

Despite official non-recognition, the United States and the People's Republic of China held 136 meetings at the ambassadorial level beginning in 1954 and continuing until 1970, first in Geneva and in 1958–1970 in Warsaw.

The Cultural Revolution brought about near-complete isolation of China from the outside world and vocal denunciations of both US imperialism and Soviet revisionism.

Beginning in 1967, the Foreign Claims Settlement Commission established the China Claims Program, in which American citizens could denominate the sum total of their lost assets and property following the Communist seizure of foreign property in 1950. American companies were reluctant to invest in China despite (future top leader) Deng Xiaoping's reassurances of a stable business environment.

=== Rapprochement (1968–1972) ===
The end of the 1960s brought a period of transformation. For China, when US president Johnson decided to wind down the Vietnam War in 1968, it gave China the impression that the US had no interest in expanding throughout the Asia-Pacific anymore. Meanwhile, relations with the USSR rapidly worsened. This gave Richard Nixon - running for president in 1968 - the idea of using that rivalry to improve Washington's relations with Moscow and Beijing, while each rival would cut back support for Hanoi.

This became an especially important concern for the People's Republic of China after the Sino-Soviet border conflict of 1969. The PRC was diplomatically isolated and the leadership came to believe that improved relations with the US would be a useful counterbalance to the Soviet threat. Zhou Enlai, the Premier of China, was at the forefront of this effort with the committed backing of Mao Zedong, Chairman of the Chinese Communist Party (CCP). In 1969, the US initiated measures to relax trade restrictions and other impediments to bilateral contact, to which China responded. However, this rapprochement process was stalled by the Vietnam War, where China was supporting the enemies of the US. Communication between Chinese and American leaders, however, was conducted through Romania, Pakistan and Poland as intermediaries. The warming US–Soviet and US-China relationships in 1972 due to the triangular diplomacy coincided with crucial periods in the Paris Peace Talks. Because of Nixon's diplomatic groundwork, neither Moscow nor Beijing intervened in the US Christmas bombing campaign against Hanoi in late 1972. They offered verbal protests but prioritized their new relationships with Washington over their alliance with Hanoi. This isolated North Vietnam and forced them back to the negotiating table within 11 days. Many historians argue that the shifting dynamics of the strategic triangle played a critical role in changing the North Vietnamese's negotiating strategy and ultimately led to the signing of the Paris Peace Accords in January 1973.

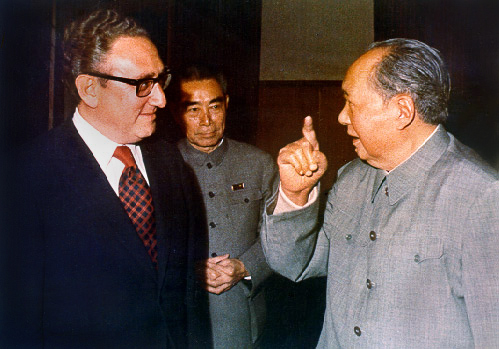
Henry Kissinger, Zhou Enlai and Mao Zedong. Kissinger made two secret trips to the PRC in 1971 before Nixon's groundbreaking visit in 1972.

In the US, academics such as John K. Fairbank and A. Doak Barnett pointed to the need to deal realistically with the Beijing government, while organizations such as the National Committee on United States–China Relations sponsored debates to promote public awareness. Many saw the specter of Communist China behind communist movements in Vietnam, Cambodia, and Laos, but a growing number concluded that if the PRC would align with the US it would mean a major redistribution of global power against the Soviets. Mainland China's market of nearly one billion consumers appealed to American businesses. Senator J. William Fulbright, Chair of the Senate Foreign Relations Committee, held a series of hearings on the matter.

Richard M. Nixon mentioned in his inaugural address that the two countries were entering an era of negotiation after an era of confrontation. Although Nixon, during his 1960 presidential campaign, had vociferously supported Chiang Kai-Shek, by the second half of the decade, he increasingly began to speak of there "being no reason to leave China angry and isolated". Nixon's election as president in 1968 was initially met with hostility by Beijing—an editorial in the People's Daily denounced him as "a chieftain whom the capitalist world had turned to out of desperation". Nixon believed it was in the American national interest to forge a relationship with China, even though there were enormous differences between the two countries. He was assisted in this by his National Security Advisor Henry Kissinger. Both Nixon and Kissinger believed that relations with China would help the US exit the Vietnam War and obtain long-term strategic benefits in confrontations with the Soviet Union.

In 1971, an unexpectedly friendly encounter between the American and Chinese ping-pong athletes called Glenn Cowan and Zhuang Zedong in Japan opened the way for a visit to China, which Chairman Mao personally approved. In April 1971, the athletes became the first Americans to officially visit China since the communist takeover. The smooth acceptance of this created the term ping-pong diplomacy and gave confidence to both sides. Ping-pong diplomacy became one of the most prominent examples of people's diplomacy in China–US relations. The ping-pong diplomacy allowed reporters into the country as well, opening up communication to both sides and breaking a barrier that had been there previously. This smoothed out the start of the trade partnership that was going to happen later. China's approach to keeping these early exchanges unofficial and conduct them through non-governmental agencies was generally well received by US civil society groups and academics.

In July 1971, Henry Kissinger feigned illness while on a trip to Pakistan and did not appear in public for a day. He was actually on a top-secret mission to Beijing to negotiate with Chinese Premier Zhou Enlai.

Kissinger and his aides did not receive a warm welcome in Beijing, and the hotel they stayed in was equipped with pamphlets excoriating US imperialism. However, the meeting with Zhou Enlai was productive, and the Chinese premier expressed his hope for improved China–US relations. He commented that the US had intentionally isolated China, not vice versa, and any initiative to restore diplomatic ties had to come from the American side. Zhou spoke of the late president Kennedy's plans to restore relations with China and told Kissinger, "We are willing to wait as long as we need to. If these negotiations fail, in time another Kennedy or another Nixon will come along."

On 15 July 1971, President Richard Nixon revealed the mission to the world and that he had accepted an invitation to visit the PRC.

This announcement caused immediate shock around the world. In the US, some hard-line anti-communists (most notably libertarian Republican Arizona Senator Barry Goldwater) denounced the decision, but most public opinions supported the move and Nixon saw the jump in the polls he had been hoping for. Since Nixon had sterling anti-communist credentials he was all but immune to being called "soft on communism". Nixon and his aides wanted to ensure that press coverage offered dramatic imagery. Nixon was particularly eager for strong news coverage.

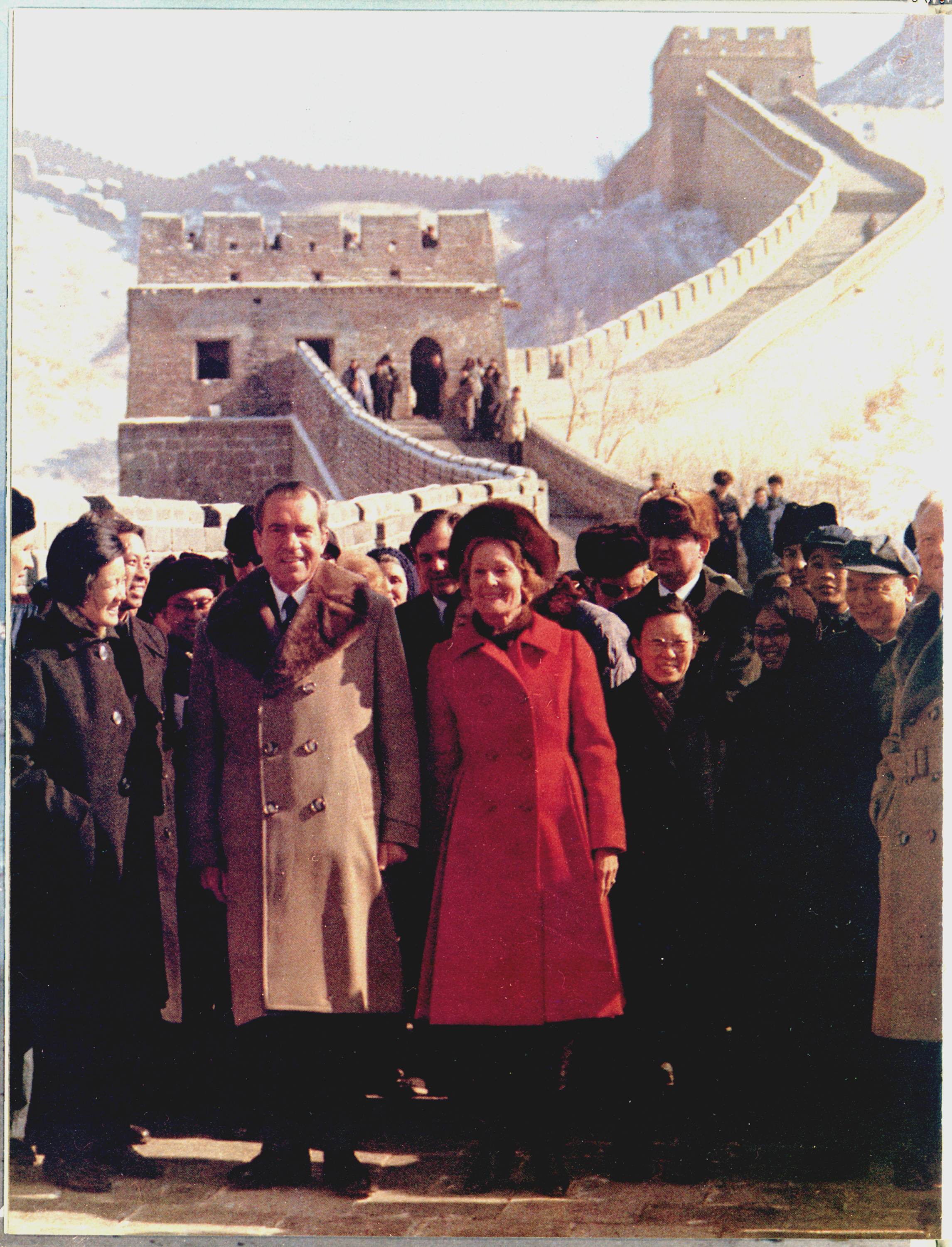
President Nixon and First Lady Pat Nixon walk with the American delegation and their Chinese hosts on the Great Wall of China.

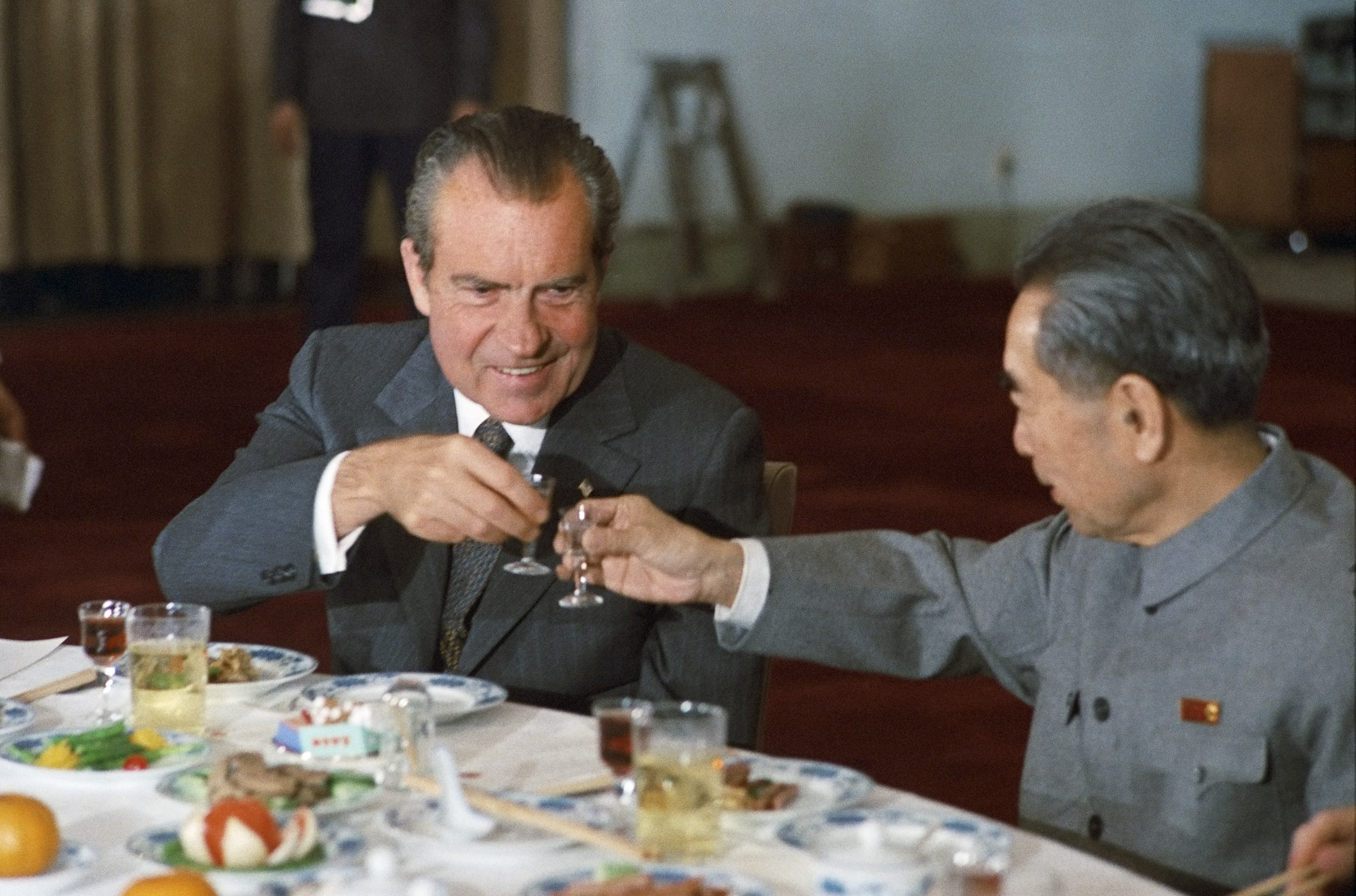
President Nixon and Premier Zhou Enlai toast during Nixon's 1972 visit to China

Within the PRC there was also opposition from left-wing elements. This effort was allegedly led by Lin Biao, head of the military, who died in a mysterious plane crash over Mongolia while trying to defect to the Soviet Union. His death silenced most internal dissent over the visit.

Internationally, reactions varied. In the communist world, the Soviets were very concerned that two major enemies seemed to have resolved their differences, and the new world alignment contributed significantly to the policy of détente.

America's NATO allies were pleased by the initiative, especially since many of them had already recognized the PRC. Throughout the Asia-Pacific, the reaction was far more mixed. Japan was annoyed that it had not been told of the announcement until fifteen minutes before it had been made, and feared that the Americans were abandoning them in favor of the PRC. A short time later, Japan also recognized the PRC and committed to substantial trade with the continental power. South Korea and South Vietnam were both concerned that peace between the US and the PRC could mean an end to American support for them against their communist enemies. Throughout the period of rapprochement, both countries had to be regularly assured that they would not be abandoned. Taiwan's Chiang Kai-Shek criticized the move, saying: "Today any international appease movement to evil power to seek for political power balance would never helpful for the world peace, instead it elongated the hardship of our 700 million people, and expand the disaster of the world."

From 21 to 28 February 1972, President Nixon traveled to Beijing, Hangzhou, and Shanghai. At the conclusion of his trip, the US and the PRC issued the Shanghai Communiqué, a statement of their respective foreign policy views. In the Communiqué, both nations pledged to work toward the full normalization of diplomatic relations. This did not lead to immediate recognition of the People's Republic of China but 'liaison offices' were established in Beijing and Washington. The US acknowledged the PRC position that all Chinese on both sides of the Taiwan Strait maintain that there is only one China and that Taiwan is part of China. The statement enabled the US and PRC to temporarily set aside the issue of Taiwan and open trade and communication. Also, the US and China both agreed to take action against "any country" that is to establish "hegemony" in the Asia-Pacific. On several issues, such as the ongoing conflicts in Korea, Vietnam, and Israel, the US and China were unable to reach a common understanding.

The rapprochement with the US benefited the PRC immensely and greatly increased its security for the rest of the Cold War. It has been argued that the US, on the other hand, saw fewer benefits than it had hoped for, inasmuch as China continued to back America's enemies in Hanoi and Pyongyang. Eventually, however, the PRC's suspicion of Vietnam's motives led to a break in China-Vietnamese cooperation and, upon the Vietnamese invasion of Cambodia in 1979, the Sino-Vietnamese War. Both China and the US backed combatants in Africa against Soviet and Cuban-supported movements. The economic benefits of normalization were slow as it would take decades for American products to penetrate the vast Chinese market. While Nixon's China policy is regarded by many as the highlight of his presidency, others such as William Bundy have argued that it provided very little benefit to the US.

=== Liaison Office (1973–1978) ===
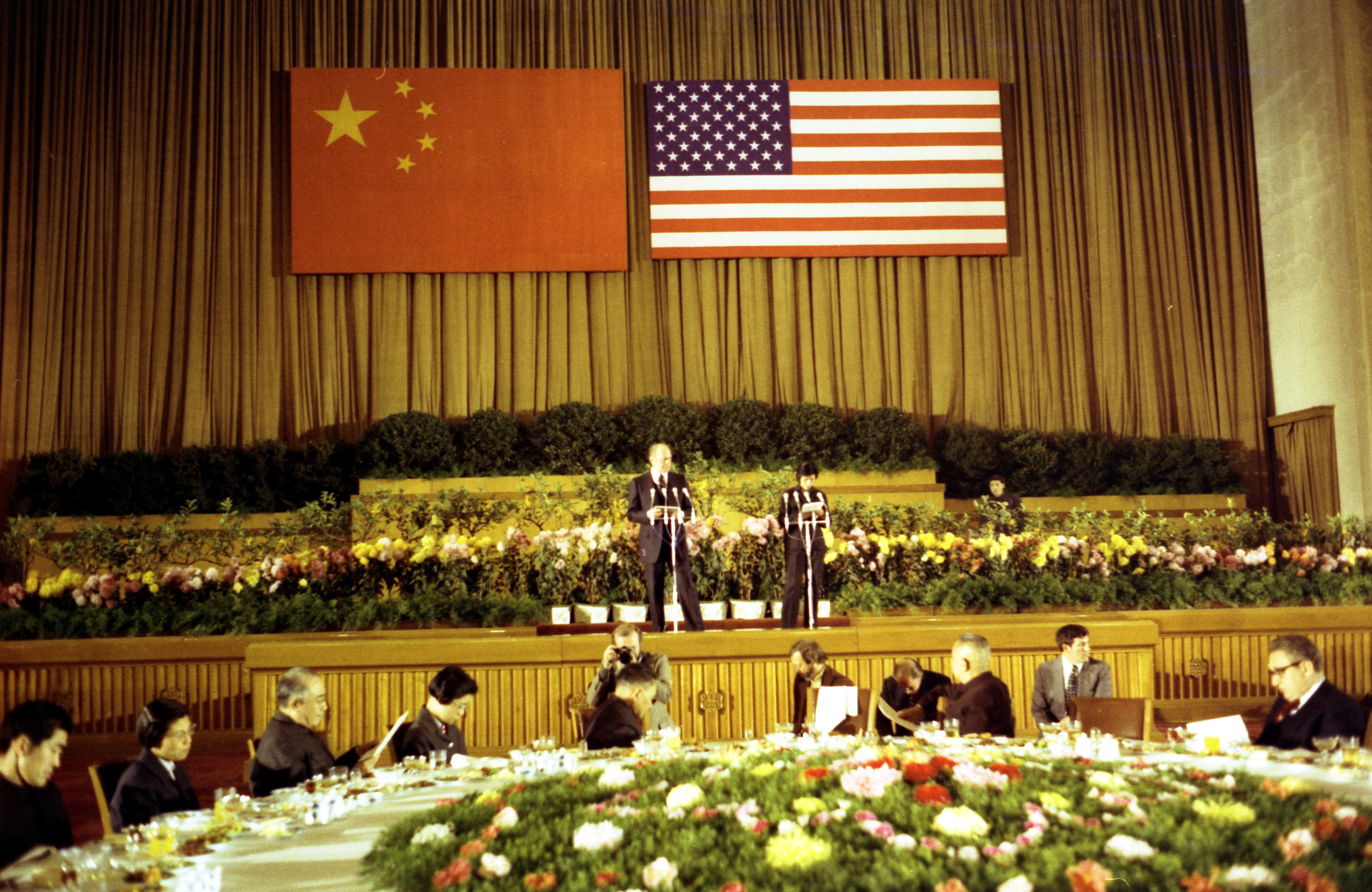
President Gerald Ford makes remarks at a Reciprocal Dinner in Beijing on 4 December 1975.

In May 1973, in an effort to build toward formal diplomatic relations, the US and the PRC established the United States Liaison Office (USLO) in Beijing and a counterpart PRC office in Washington, D.C. From 1973 to 1978, such distinguished Americans as David K. E. Bruce, George H. W. Bush, Thomas S. Gates, Jr., and Leonard Woodcock served as chiefs of the USLO with the personal rank of ambassador. China made clear that it considered the Soviet Union its chief adversary and urged the US to be powerful, thereby distracting Moscow. Liaison officer George Bush concluded, "China keeps wanting us to be strong, wanting us to defend Europe, wanting us to increase our defense budgets, etc." Bush concluded that American engagement was essential to support markets, allies, and stability throughout the Asia Pacific and around the world.

President Gerald Ford visited the PRC in 1975 and reaffirmed American interest in normalizing relations with Beijing. Shortly after taking office in 1977, President Jimmy Carter again reaffirmed the goals of the Shanghai Communiqué. Secretary of State Cyrus Vance, Carter's National Security Advisor Zbigniew Brzezinski, and senior staff member of the National Security Council Michel Oksenberg encouraged Carter to seek full diplomatic and trade relations with China. Although Brzezinski sought to quickly establish a security relationship with Beijing to counter the Soviet Union, Carter sided with Vance in believing that such a deal would threaten existing US-Soviet relations, including the SALT II negotiations. Thus, the administration decided to cautiously pursue political normalization and not military relations. Vance, Brzezinski, and Oksenberg traveled to Beijing in early 1978 to work with Leonard Woodcock, then head of the liaison office, to lay the groundwork to do so. The US and the PRC announced on 15 December 1978, that the two governments would establish diplomatic relations on 1 January 1979.

=== Normalization (1979–1989) ===
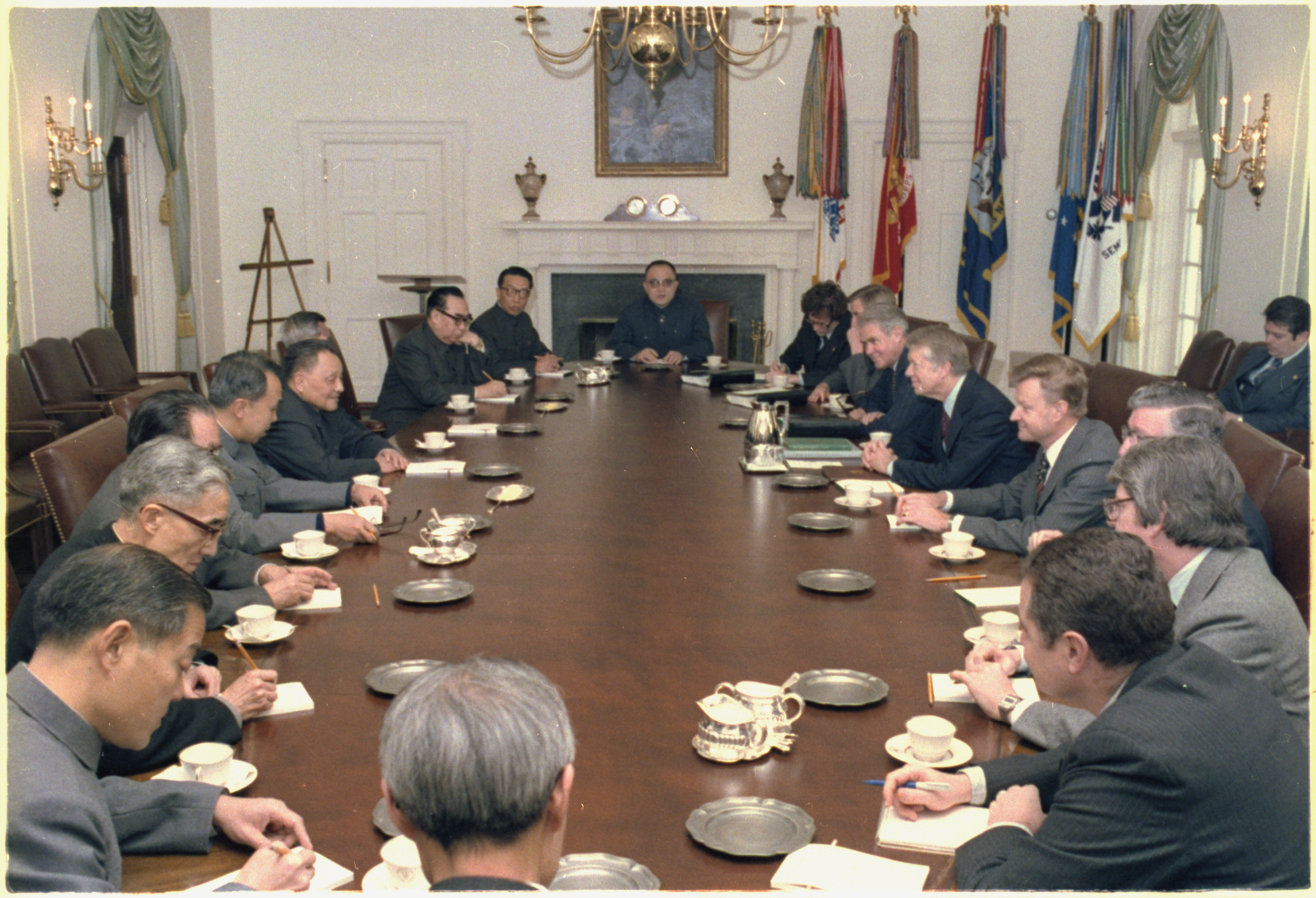
US president Jimmy Carter, Zbigniew Brzezinski, and other US officials meet in the White House Cabinet Room with Chinese leader Deng Xiaoping, 29 January 1979.

In the Joint Communiqué on the Establishment of Diplomatic Relations, dated 1 January 1979, the United States transferred diplomatic recognition from Taipei to Beijing. The US reiterated the Shanghai Communiqué's acknowledgment of the Chinese position that there is only one China, and that Taiwan is a part of China; Beijing acknowledged that the American people would continue to carry on commercial, cultural, and other unofficial contacts with the people of Taiwan.

Taiwan, although fully expecting this step, nonetheless expressed disappointment at having not been consulted first. The reaction of the communist world was similar to 1972, with the Soviet Union and its allies in Eastern Europe mostly being noncommittal, Romania welcoming the move, and Cuba and Albania being strongly against it.

Chinese leader Deng Xiaoping's January 1979 visit to Washington initiated a series of important, high-level exchanges which continued until the spring of 1989. This resulted in many bilateral agreements, including the 31 January 1979 Agreement on Cooperation in Science and Technology. Scientific cooperation greatly increased thereafter. Since early 1979, the US and the PRC have initiated hundreds of joint research projects and cooperative programs under the Agreement on Cooperation in Science and Technology, the largest bilateral program.

On 1 March 1979, the two countries formally established embassies in each other's capitals. In 1979, outstanding private claims were resolved and a bilateral trade agreement was completed. Vice President Walter Mondale reciprocated Vice Premier Deng's visit with an August 1979 trip to China. This visit led to agreements in September 1980 on maritime affairs, civil aviation links, and textile matters, as well as a bilateral consular convention.

The threats of the Soviet invasion of Afghanistan and Vietnamese invasion of Cambodia were major factors that brought Washington and Beijing closer than ever before. In June 1979, US Secretary of Health, Education, and Welfare Joseph A. Califano Jr. led an American delegation to China; the trip resulted in the long-term institutionalization of health and education links between the two countries. US–China military cooperation increased over the course of 1979 and 1980. In 1980, China allowed the United States to establish electronic listening stations in Xinjiang so the US could monitor Soviet rocket launches in Central Asia. In exchange, the US authorized the sale of dual-use civilian and military technology and nonlethal military equipment to China.

Chinese demands for advanced technology from the US were not always met, in part due to opposition from Congressmen who either distrusted technology transfer to a communist nation out of principle or concern that there was no guarantee that such technology would not end up in the hands of unfriendly third parties. In 1983, the US State Department changed its classification of China to a "friendly developing nation", thereby increasing the amount of technology and armaments that could be sold. The skepticism of some US congressmen was not entirely unmerited as China, during the 1980s, continued to sell arms to Iran and other states that were openly hostile to American interests.

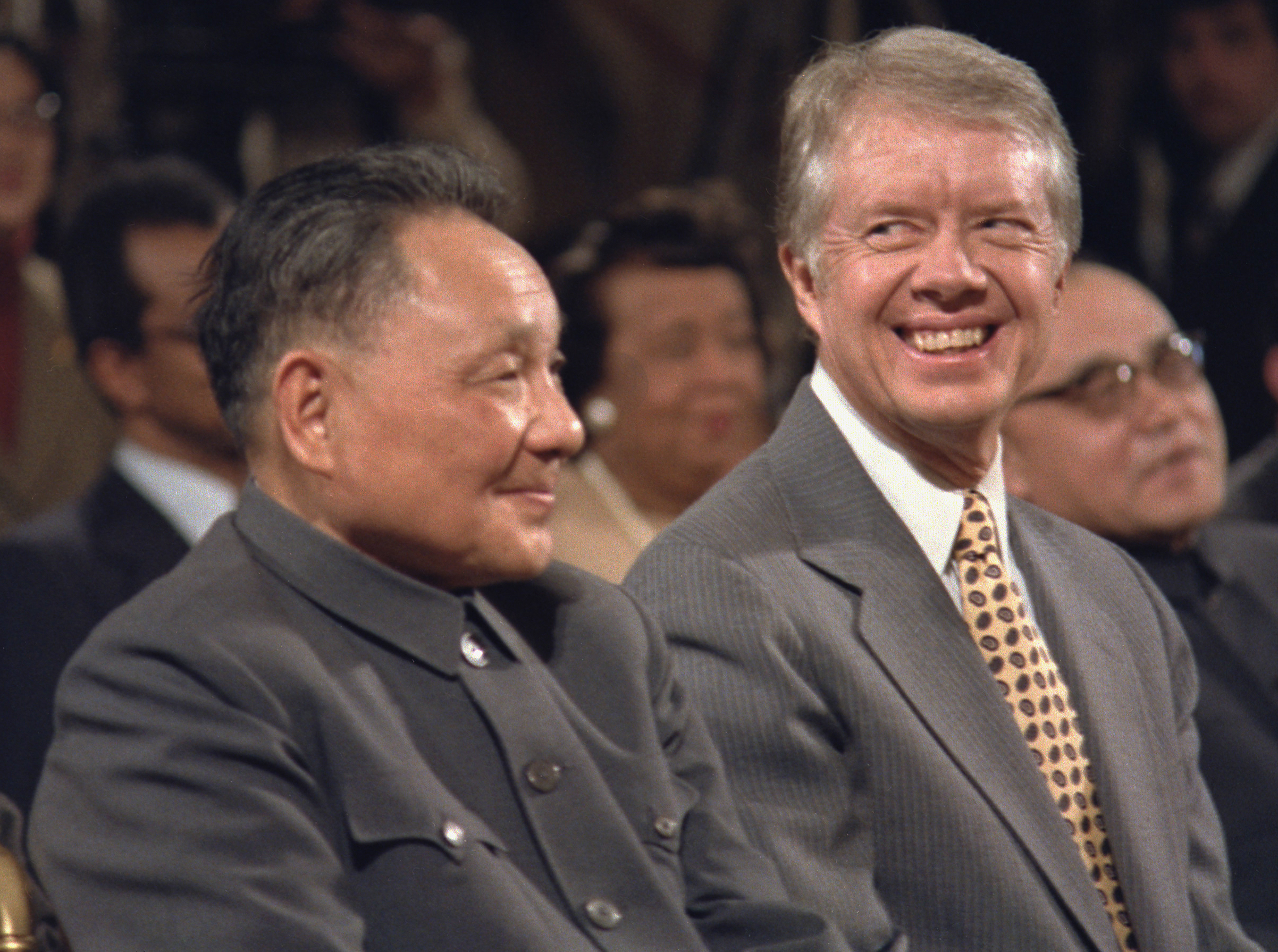
Chinese leader Deng Xiaoping with US president Jimmy Carter

As a consequence of high-level and working-level contacts initiated in 1980, US dialogue with the PRC broadened to cover a wide range of issues, including global and regional strategic problems, political-military questions, including arms control, UN, and other multilateral organization affairs, and international narcotics matters. New York City and Beijing became sister cities.

High-level exchanges continued to be a significant means for developing US–PRC relations in the 1980s. President Ronald Reagan and Premier Zhao Ziyang made reciprocal visits in 1984. Reagan's visit to Beijing went well, however, a speech he made criticizing the Soviet Union and praising capitalism, democracy, and freedom of religion was not aired on Chinese state television. In July 1985, Chinese president Li Xiannian traveled to the US, the first such visit by a PRC head of state. Vice President Bush visited the PRC in October 1985 and opened the US Consulate General in Chengdu, the US's fourth consular post in the PRC. Further exchanges of cabinet-level officials occurred between 1985 and 1989, capped by President Bush's visit to Beijing in February 1989.

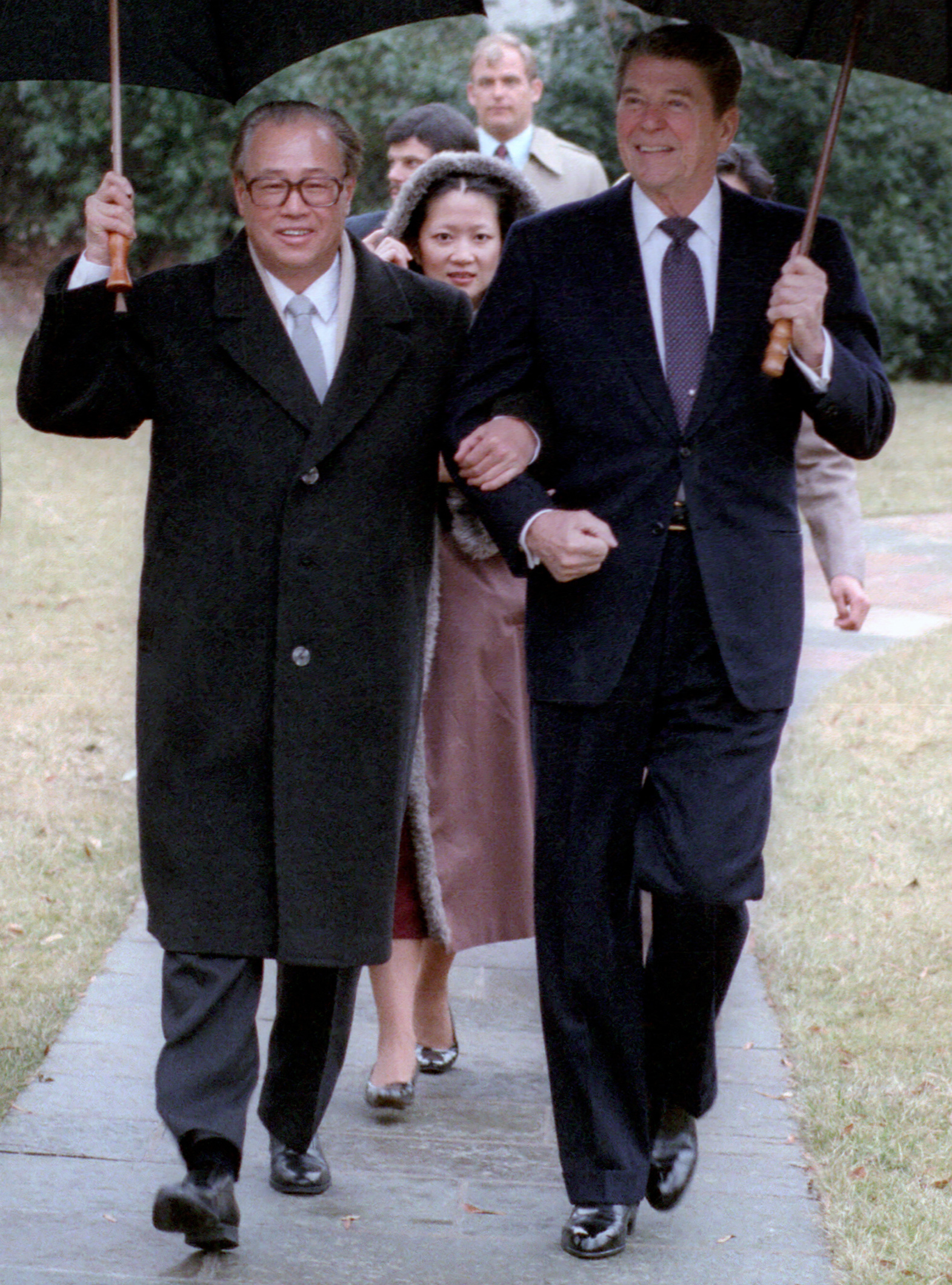
President Ronald Reagan walking with Premier Zhao Ziyang during his visit to the White House on 10 January 1984

Shortly after being elected president in 1980, Ronald Reagan made a speech criticizing the PRC and welcoming restoration of ties with Taiwan. These remarks aroused initial concern in Beijing, but Reagan's advisers quickly apologized for his comments, and the president-elect soon retracted them. Reagan's first two years in office saw some deterioration in US–China relations due to the president's vociferous anti-communism, as well as the inability of the two nations to come to a common understanding over the Korean conflict, the Israel–Palestine conflict, or the Falklands War. In 1982, Chinese leader Deng Xiaoping, in a reiteration of Mao Zedong's "Three Worlds" theory, criticized both the US and Soviet Union for imperialism. In 1983, there were quarrels over a Chinese tennis player, Hu Na, who defected to the US, and over an incident where an Olympic parade float in New York City displayed the flag of Taiwan rather than the PRC's flag. Relations in the early part of 1984 were strained over the issue of US arms sales to Taiwan, but later improved.

By the late 1980s, China was the US's largest partner for science and technology, which had become the largest type of government-to-government exchange between the two countries.

In the period before the 1989 Tiananmen Square protests and massacre, a growing number of cultural exchange activities gave the American and Chinese peoples broad exposure to each other's cultural, artistic, and educational achievements. Numerous mainland Chinese professionals and official delegations visited the US each month. Many of these exchanges continued after the suppression of the Tiananmen protests.

In the first decade after normalization, the US's policy towards China was largely driven by the Executive Branch of the United States, with the notable exception of the Taiwan Relations Act. As a result of the Executive-branch driven approach during this period, China concluded that US presidents primarily raised Congressional issues as a negotiating tool and that Congress was not itself a significant force in China–US relations. Consequently, China was slow to develop its Congressional liaison capacity.

== Contemporary relations ==
=== George H. W. Bush administration (1989–1993) ===
Americans who had been optimistic about the emergence of democratic characteristics in response to the rapid economic growth and China were stunned and disappointed by the brutal crackdown of the pro-democratic Tiananmen Square protests in 1989. The US and other governments enacted a number of measures against China's violation of human rights. The US suspended high-level official exchanges with the PRC and weapons exports from the US to the PRC. The US also imposed a number of economic sanctions. In the summer of 1990, at the G7 Houston summit, the West called for renewed political and economic reforms in mainland China, particularly in the field of human rights.

The Tiananmen event disrupted the US–China trade relationship, and US investors' interest in mainland China dropped dramatically. Tourist traffic fell off sharply. The Bush administration denounced the repression and suspended certain trade and investment programs on 5 and 20 June 1989, however Congress was responsible for imposing many of these actions, and the White House itself took a far less critical attitude of Beijing, repeatedly expressing hope that the two countries could maintain normalized relations. Generally, Bush's preference was for sanctions which were not formalized in law in order to provide flexibility for altering or removing them. Some sanctions were legislated while others were executive actions. Examples include:

- The US Trade and Development Agency (TDA): new activities in mainland China were suspended from June 1989 until January 2001, when President Bill Clinton lifted this suspension.
- Overseas Private Insurance Corporation (OPIC): new activities have been suspended since June 1989.
- Development Bank Lending/International Monetary Fund (IMF) Credits: the US does not support development bank lending and will not support IMF credits to the PRC except for projects that address basic human needs.
- Munitions List Exports: subject to certain exceptions, no licenses may be issued for the export of any defense article on the US Munitions List. This restriction may be waived upon a presidential national interest determination.
- Arms Imports – import of defense articles from the PRC was banned after the imposition of the ban on arms exports to the PRC. The import ban was subsequently waived by the administration and reimposed on 26 May 1994. It covers all items on the BATFE's Munitions Import List. During this critical period, J. Stapleton Roy, a career US Foreign Service officer, served as ambassador to Beijing.

Debate within the United States also began on whether China should continue to receive the annual presidential waiver for most favored nation trading status under the Jackson-Vanik Amendment.

US–China military ties and arms sales were terminated in 1989 and as of 2026 have never been fully restored. Chinese public opinion became more hostile to the United States after 1989, as typified by the 1996 manifesto China Can Say No. The authors called for Beijing to take more aggressive actions against the US and Japan in order to build a stronger international position. The Chinese government at first endorsed the manifesto, then repudiated it as irresponsible.

The end of the Cold War and dissolution of the Soviet Union removed the original motives underlying rapprochement between China and the US. Motivated by concerns that the United States might curtail support for China's modernization, Deng adopted a low-profile foreign policy to live with the fact of United States hegemony and focus primarily on domestic development.

=== Clinton administration (1993–2001) ===
US president Bill Clinton and Chinese leader Jiang Zemin with first ladies Hillary Clinton and Wang Yeping at the White House during Jiang's state visit to the United States in October 1997.

Running for president in 1992, Bill Clinton sharply criticized his predecessor George H. W. Bush for prioritizing profitable trade relationships over human rights issues in China. Clinton's 28 May 1993 Executive Order 128950 linked future extension of China's most favored nation trading status to China's progress on US-defined human rights measures. China made virtually no effort to comply with the US conditions and in mid-1994 Clinton changed his position, de-linking the China's most favored nation status from human rights issues.

Congressional pressure, especially from the Republican Party, prompted Clinton to approve arms sales to Taiwan, despite the strong displeasure voiced by Beijing.

In July 1993, a symbolic United States Congressional resolution opposed China's efforts to be selected as the host country for the 2000 Summer Olympics. The resolution became a major grievance among the Chinese public, which generally viewed the Resolution as an effort to humiliate China.

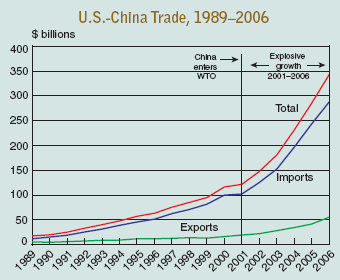
thuimb

In July 1993, the US Navy stopped the Yinhe, a Chinese container ship, en route to Kuwait in international waters, cut off its GPS so that it lost direction and was forced to anchor, and held it in place for twenty-four days. The United States incorrectly alleged that the Yinhe was carrying precursors of chemical weapons for Iran. It eventually forced an inspection of the ship in Saudi Arabia, but found no chemical precursors. The United States refused China's request for a formal apology and refused to pay compensation. This incident was viewed in China as international bullying by the United States. Nonetheless, Chinese leader Jiang Zemin adopted a diplomatic posture of goodwill and a "sixteen-characters formula" to working with the United States: "enhancing confidence, avoiding troubles, expanding cooperation, and avoiding confrontation".

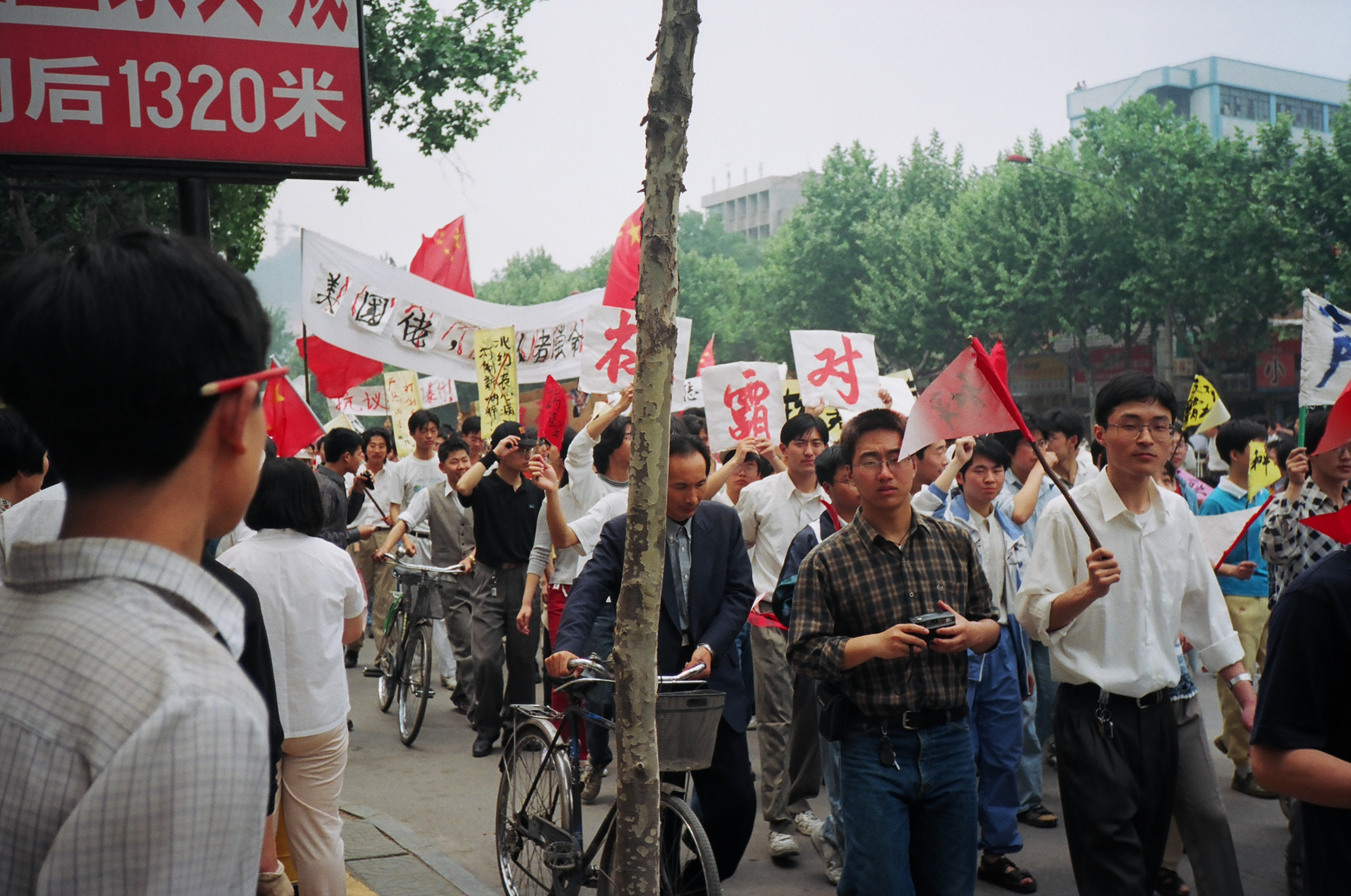
Anti-American protests in Nanjing following the United States bombing of the Chinese embassy in Belgrade, 1999

In 1996, the People's Liberation Army conducted military exercises in the Taiwan Strait in an apparent effort to intimidate the Republic of China electorate before the pending presidential elections, triggering the Third Taiwan Strait Crisis. The United States dispatched two aircraft carrier battle groups to the region. Subsequently, tensions in the Taiwan Strait diminished and relations between the US and the PRC improved, with increased high-level exchanges and progress on numerous bilateral issues, including human rights, nuclear proliferation, and trade.

China's leader Jiang Zemin visited the United States in the fall of 1997, the first state visit to the US by a paramount leader since 1979. In connection with that visit, the two sides came to a consensus on implementation of their 1985 agreement on Peaceful Nuclear Cooperation, as well as a number of other issues. President Clinton visited the PRC in June 1998. He traveled extensively in mainland China, and had direct interaction with the Chinese people, including live speeches and a radio show which allowed the president to convey a sense of American ideals and values. In a speech at Peking University, he referred to the 21st century as "your century", and expressed his view that technology, including the internet, would help ease any tensions China's economic growth might cause. President Clinton was criticized by some, however, for failing to pay adequate attention to human rights abuses in mainland China. When Clinton visited Shanghai, he declared the "three nos" for United States foreign policy towards China: (1) not recognizing two Chinas, (2) not supporting Taiwanese independence, and (3) not supporting Taiwanese efforts to join international organizations for which sovereignty is a membership requirement.

Relations were damaged for a time by the United States bombing of the Chinese embassy in Belgrade on 7 May 1999, which was stated by the White House to be miscoordination between intelligence and the military. The bombing created outrage among Chinese people, who did not accept the United States claim that the bombing was accidental. For several days, Beijing was rocked by massive anti-US demonstrations. Deeming the importance of the bilateral relationship too great to be harmed by the embassy bombing, Chinese leader Jiang Zemin sought to calm the Chinese public outrage. By the end of 1999, relations began to gradually improve. In October 1999, the two countries reached an agreement on compensation for families of those who were victims, as well as payments for damages to respective diplomatic properties in Belgrade and China. US–China relations in 1999 were also damaged by accusations that a Chinese-American scientist at the Los Alamos National Laboratory had given US nuclear secrets to Beijing.

=== George W. Bush administration (2001–2009) ===
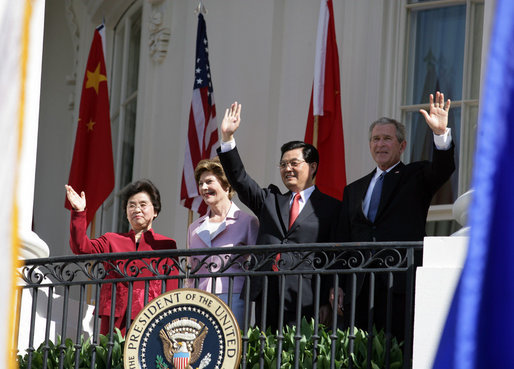
US president George W. Bush and Chinese leader Hu Jintao with first ladies Laura Bush and Liu Yongqing wave from the White House in April 2006.

As a presidential candidate in 2000, George W. Bush repeatedly criticized the Clinton-Gore administration for being too friendly with China, which he warned was a strategic competitor.

In the Hainan Island incident of 1 April 2001, a US EP-3 surveillance aircraft collided mid-air with a Chinese Shenyang J-8 jet fighter over the South China Sea. China sought a formal apology, and accepted United States Secretary of State Colin Powell's expression of "very sorry" as sufficient. The incident nonetheless created negative feelings towards the United States by the Chinese public and increased public feelings of Chinese nationalism.

Early on as President Bush increased arms sales to Taiwan, including 8 submarines. Bush's hostile position toward China was suddenly reversed after the 11 September terrorist attacks, and his friendly attitude toward Taiwan became a casualty. Soon he was calling China a strategic partner in the war on terror and postponing deals with Taiwan.

Two PRC citizens died in the attacks on the World Trade Center. Chinese leader Jiang Zemin sent a telegram to Bush within hours of the attack expressing China's condolences and opposition to terror; Bush responded with a phone call the next day stating that he looked forward to working with Jiang and other world leaders to oppose terrorism. Chinese companies and individuals also sent expressions of condolences to their American counterparts. The PRC, itself troubled by Muslim separatists in Xinjiang, offered strong public support for the war on terror in APEC China 2001. The PRC voted in favor of UNSCR 1373, publicly supported the coalition campaign in Afghanistan, and contributed $150 million of bilateral assistance to Afghan reconstruction following the defeat of the Taliban. Shortly after the 11 September terrorist attacks, the US and PRC also commenced a counterterrorism dialogue. In a March 2002 trip to Beijing, Bush articulated his desire for a "constructive, cooperative, and candid" relationship with China. The third round of that dialogue was held in Beijing in February 2003.

In the United States, the threat of terrorist attacks by al-Qaeda greatly changed the nature of its security concerns. It was no longer plausible to argue, as the Blue Team had earlier asserted, that the PRC was the primary security threat to the United States, and the need to focus on the Middle East and the war on terror made the avoidance of potential distractions in East Asia a priority for the United States.

There were initial fears among the PRC leadership that the war on terrorism would lead to an anti-PRC effort by the US, especially as the US began establishing bases in Central Asian countries like Uzbekistan and Tajikistan and renewed efforts against Iraq. The Chinese government was relieved after the United States tied up major national resources with its 2003 invasion of Iraq. China believed that the United States' Middle East meant that the United States would need China's help on issues such as counterterrorism, Middle Eastern stability, and nuclear non-proliferation and viewed the United States' focus as conducive to China's emphasis on stability and domestic development.

China and the United States worked closely on regional issues, including those pertaining to North Korea and its nuclear weapons program. China has stressed its opposition to North Korea's decision to withdraw from the Treaty on the Non-Proliferation of Nuclear Weapons, its concerns over North Korea's nuclear capabilities, and its desire for a non-nuclear Korean Peninsula. It also voted to refer North Korea's noncompliance with its International Atomic Energy Agency obligations to the UN Security Council.

In 2001, a presidential plane built in the United States for Chinese leader Jiang Zemin was found to have listening devices installed. Chinese authorities located at least 20 devices, including one in the headboard of the presidential bed. The listening devices were capable of being operated via satellite.

In the mid-2000s, the United States focused relatively less on China issues. This approach was reinforced by the economic benefits to the United States from its relations with China, including cheaper consumer products like clothing and electronics. During this period, the United States also issued significant debt to fund its military interventions and China became the largest foreign purchaser of US government debt.

Taiwan remained a volatile issue, but one that remained under control. The United States policy toward Taiwan involved emphasizing the Four Noes and One Without. On occasion the United States rebuked Republic of China (Taiwan) President Chen Shui-bian for provocative pro-independence rhetoric. As Bush made his opposition to Taiwan independence clear, the PRC saw the United States as playing a positive role in restraining the separatist movement. In 2005, the PRC passed the Anti-Secession Law which stated that the PRC would be prepared to resort to "non-peaceful means" if Taiwan declared formal independence. Many critics of the PRC, such as the Blue Team, argue that the PRC was trying to take advantage of the US war in Iraq to assert its claims on Republic of China's territory. In 2008, Taiwan voters elected Ma Ying-jeou. Ma, representing the Kuomintang, campaigned on a platform that included rapprochement with mainland China. His election has significant implications for the future of cross-strait relations.

The 2003 United States invasion of Iraq and the failure of the United States to find evidence of weapons of mass destruction decreased China's respect for America's power and realism.

China's paramount leader Hu Jintao visited the United States in April 2006. Bush visited Beijing in August for four days to attend the 2008 Summer Olympics. The president and his wife Laura were accompanied by Bush's father, the former president, and his mother Barbara.

=== Obama administration (2009–2017) ===
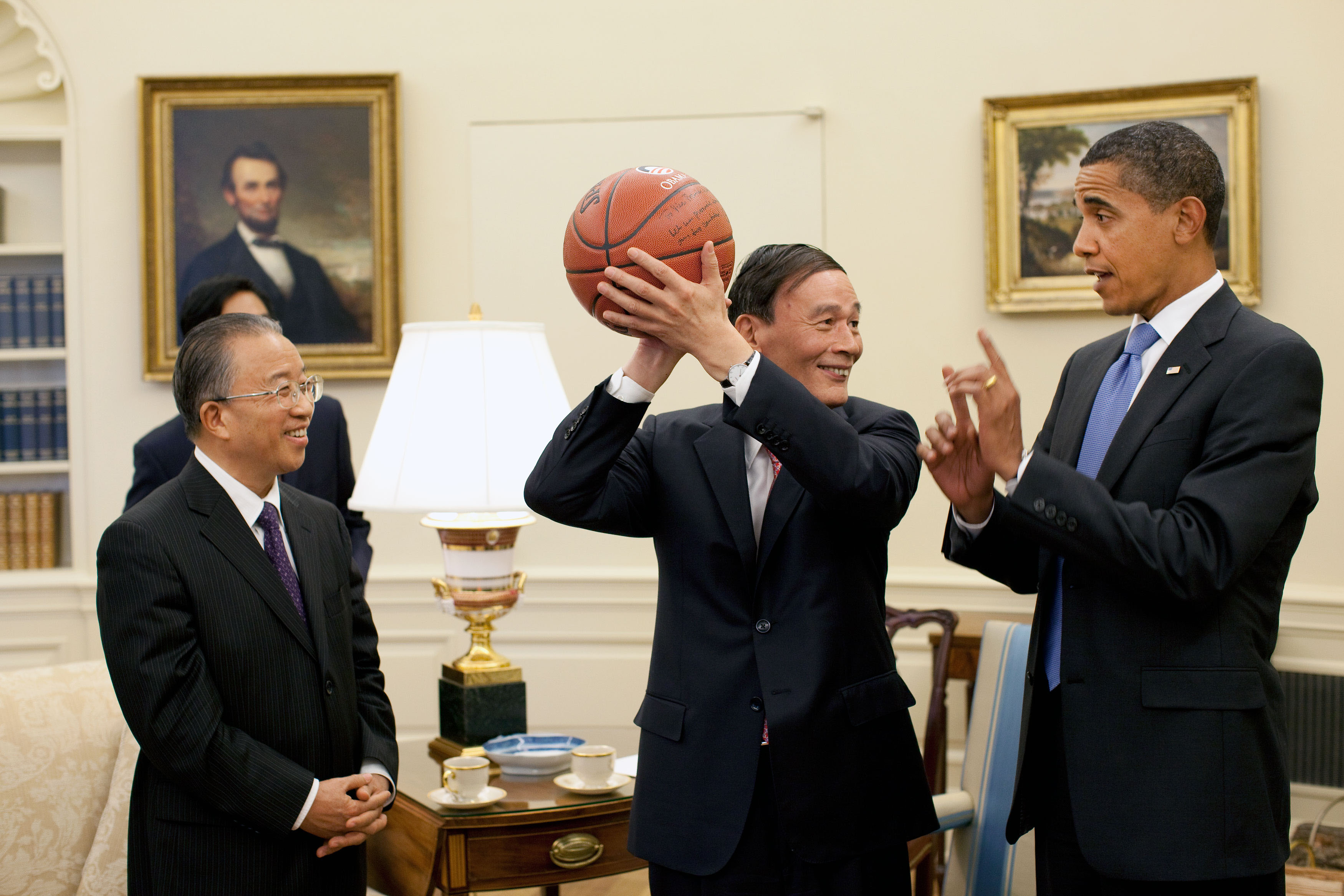
Vice Premier Wang Qishan holds the autographed basketball given to him by President Obama following their Washington meeting 28 July 2009, to discuss the outcomes of the first US–China Strategic and Economic Dialogue. Looking on at left is State Councilor Dai Bingguo.

The 2008 US presidential election centered on issues of war and economic recession, but candidates Barack Obama and John McCain also spoke extensively regarding US policy toward China. Both favored cooperation with China on major issues, but they differed with regard to trade policy. Obama expressed concern that the value of China's currency was being deliberately set low to benefit China's exporters. McCain argued that free trade was crucial and was having a transformative effect in China. Still, McCain noted that while China might have shared interests with the US, it did not share American values.

The election of Barack Obama in 2008 generated positive reactions from most locals and state-run media outlets in China. His presidency fostered hopes for increased co-operation and heightened levels of friendship between the two nations. On 8 November 2008, Chinese leader Hu Jintao and Obama shared a phone conversation in which Hu congratulated Obama on his election victory. During the conversation both parties agreed that the development of Sino-American relations is not only in the interest of both nations, but also in the interests of the international community.

During the Obama administration, the US signed more bilateral agreements with China than it had during any other US administration, particularly with regard to addressing climate change. The two countries signed seven clean energy agreements on 17 November 2009, during Obama's visit to China, including an agreement establishing the US–China Clean Energy Research Center (CERC). CERC was the most ambitious clean energy technology cooperation mechanism between the two. The many technical exchanges on climate issues during the Obama era helped both sides of the relationship to better understand each other's emissions models and data, leading to increased mutual trust.

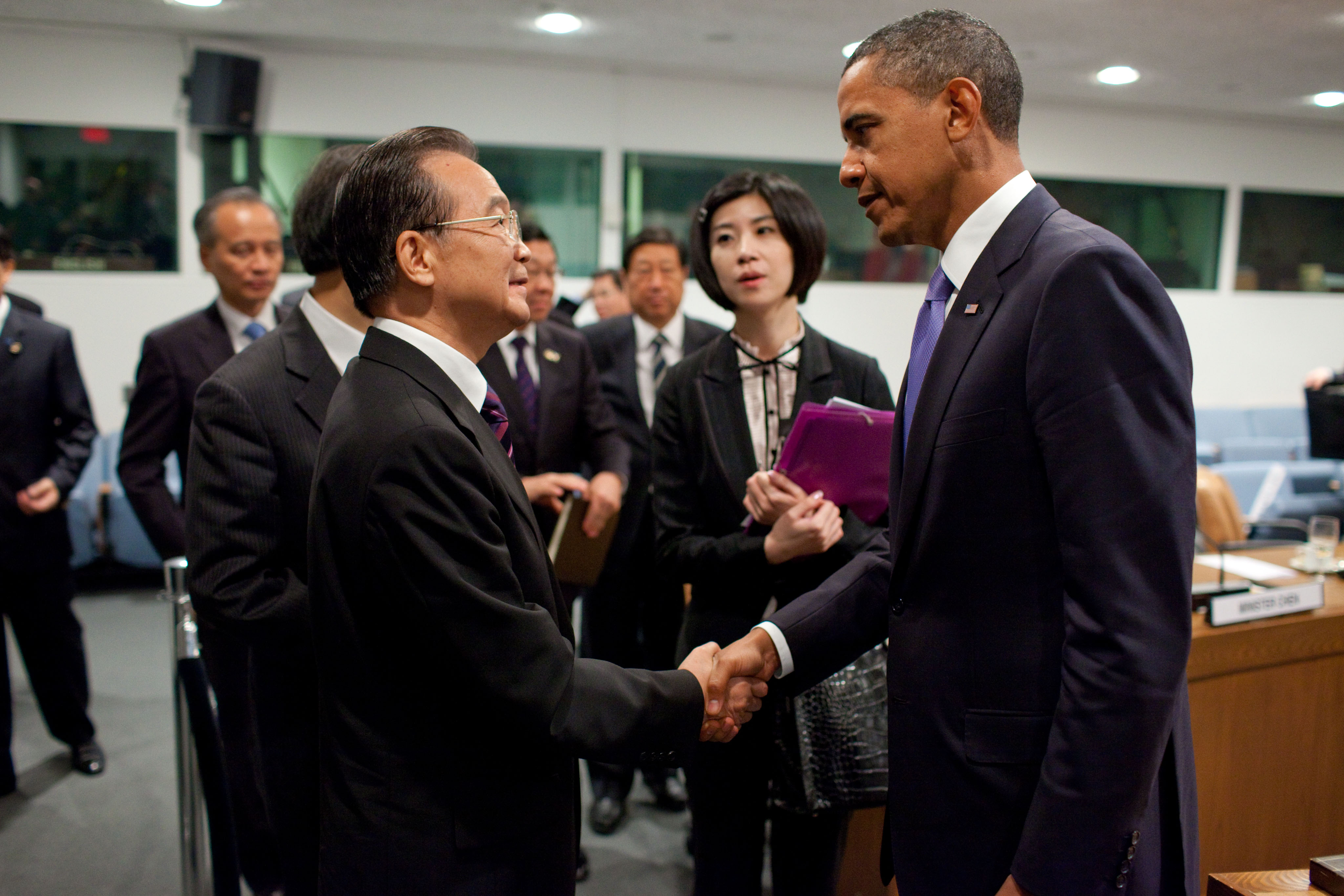
Obama meets with Chinese premier Wen Jiabao and members of the Chinese delegation after a bilateral meeting at the United Nations in New York City in September 2010.

Following the 2008 financial crisis, both US and Chinese governments addressed the economic downturn with massive stimulus initiatives. The Chinese expressed concern that "Buy American" components of the US plan discriminate against foreign producers, including those in China.

As the two most influential and powerful countries in the world, there have been increasingly strong suggestions within American political circles of creating a G-2 (Chimerica) relationship for the United States and China to work out solutions to global problems together.

The Strategic Economic Dialogue initiated by then-US president Bush and Hu and led by US treasury secretary Henry Paulson and Chinese Vice Premier Wu Yi in 2006 was broadened by the Obama administration into the US–China Strategic and Economic Dialogue. It was then led by US secretary of state Hillary Clinton and US secretary of the treasury Timothy Geithner for the United States and Vice Premier Wang Qishan and Chinese State Councilor Dai Bingguo for China. The focus of the first set of meetings in July 2009 was in response to the economic crisis, finding ways to cooperate to stem global warming and addressing issues such as the proliferation of nuclear weapons and humanitarian crises.

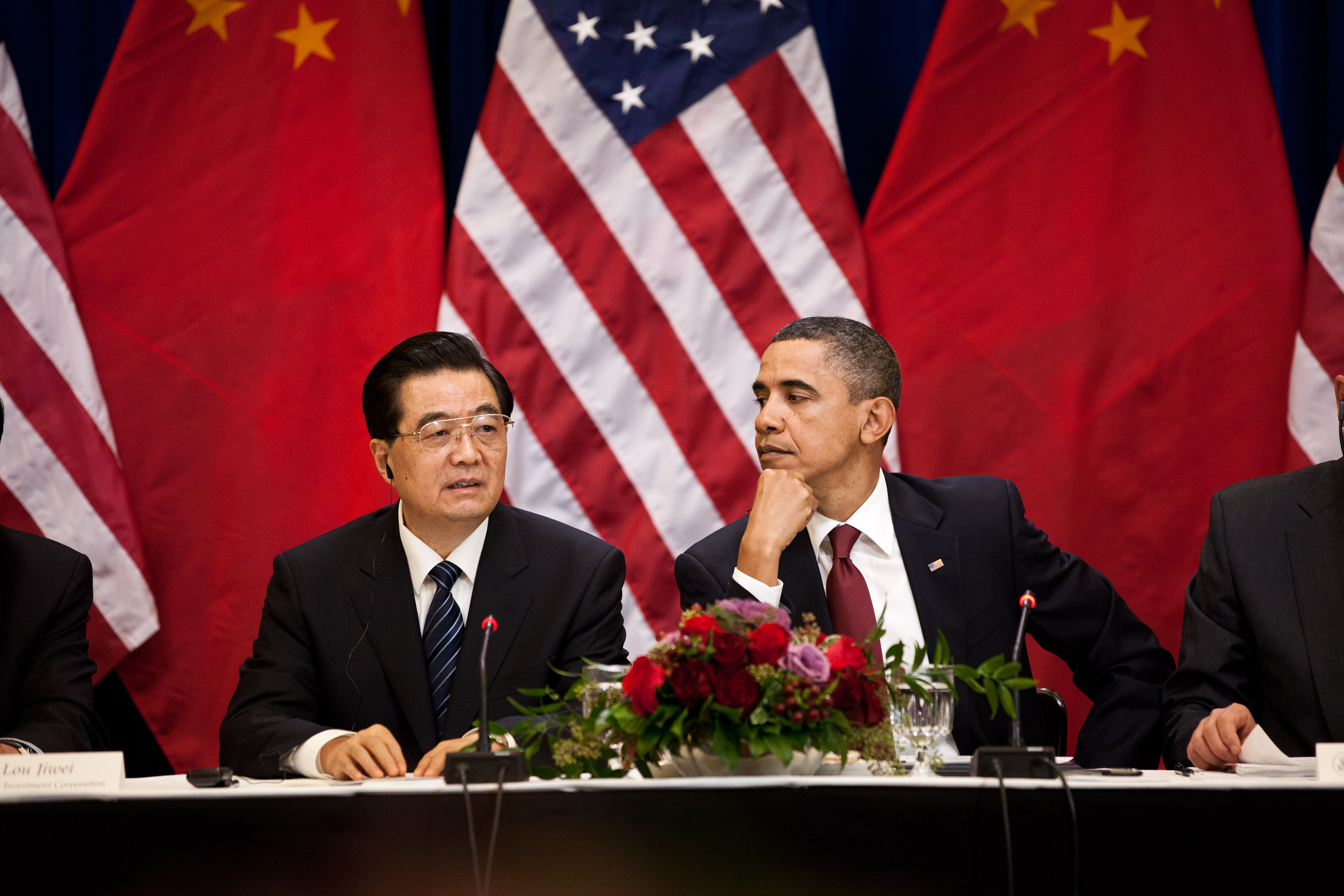
Obama meets with Chinese leader Hu Jintao in January 2011.

Obama visited China on 15–18 November 2009 to discuss economic worries, concerns over nuclear weapon proliferation, and the need for action against climate change.

In January 2010, the US proposed a $6.4 billion arms sale to the Republic of China (Taiwan). In response, the PRC threatened to impose sanctions on US companies supplying arms to Taiwan and suspend cooperation on certain regional and international issues.

On 19 February 2010, Obama met with the Dalai Lama, accused by China of "fomenting unrest in Tibet." After the meeting, China summoned the US ambassador to China, Jon Huntsman, but Time has described the Chinese reaction as "muted", speculating that it could be because "the meeting came during the Chinese New Year... when most officials are on leave". Some activists criticized Obama for the relatively low profile of the visit.

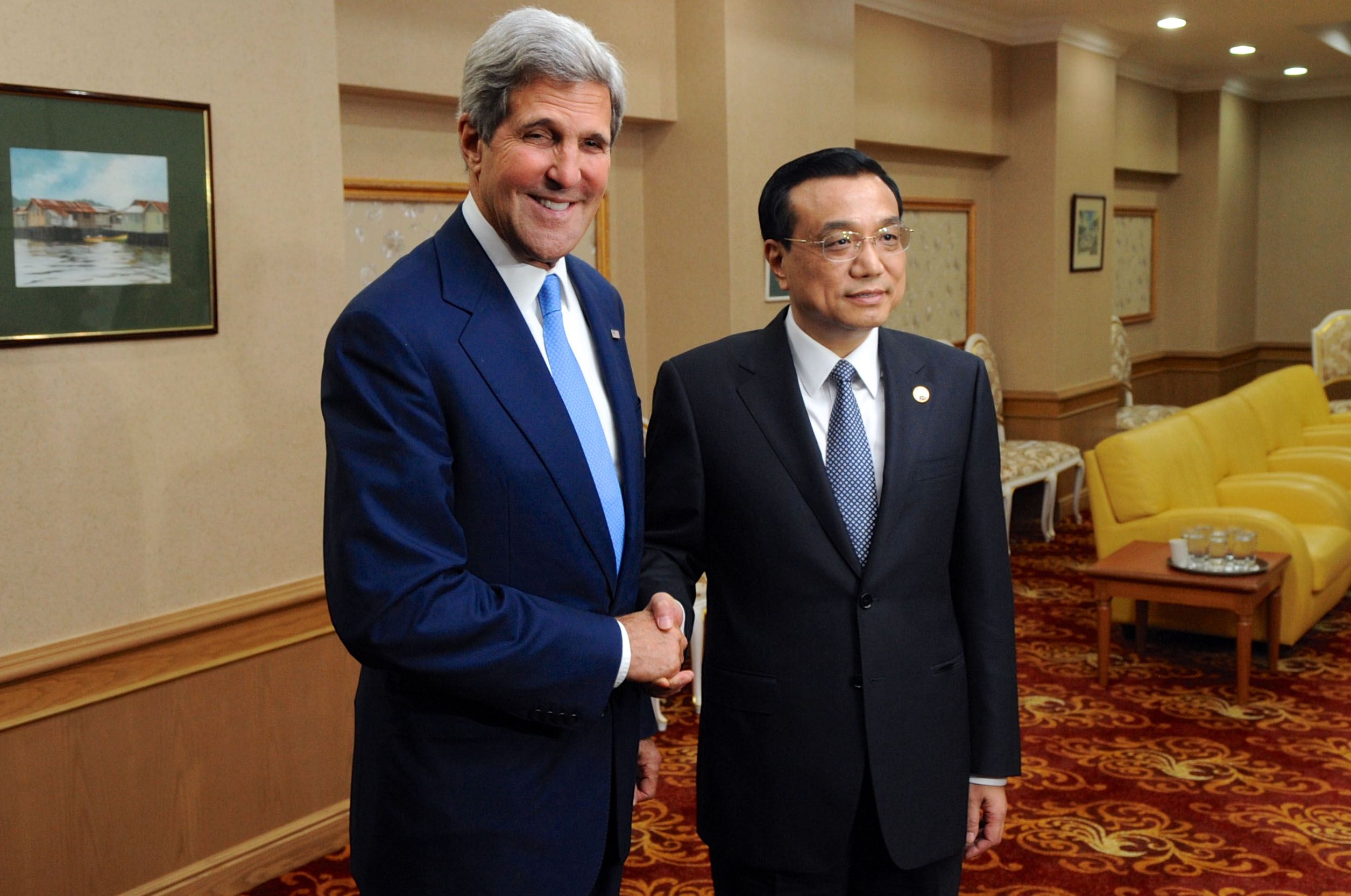
US secretary of state John Kerry speaks with Chinese Premier Li Keqiang, 9 October 2013.

In 2012, the PRC criticized Obama's new defense strategy, which it said was aimed at isolating China in East Asia. Obama is looking to increase US military influence in the area with a rotating presence of forces in friendly countries.

In March 2012, China suddenly began cutting back its purchases of oil from Iran, which along with some signs on sensitive security issues like Syria and North Korea, showed some coordination with the Obama administration.

In March 2013, the US and China agreed to impose stricter sanctions on North Korea for conducting nuclear tests, which sets the stage for UN Security Council vote. Such accord might signal a new level of cooperation between the US and China.

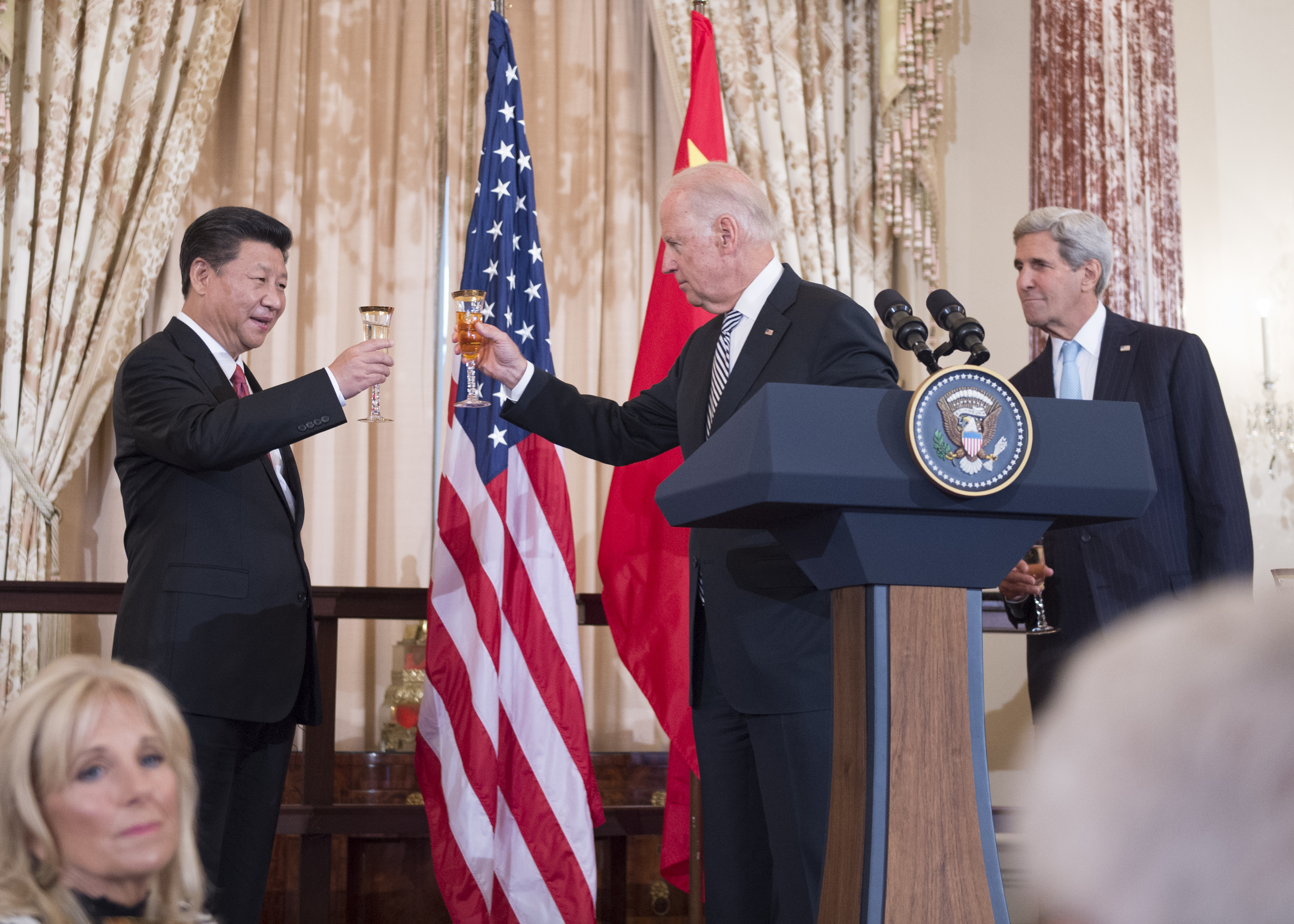
US secretary of state John Kerry and Vice President Joe Biden with Chinese leader Xi Jinping, 25 September 2015

In an effort to build a "new model" of relations, Obama met Chinese leader Xi Jinping for two days of meetings, between 6 and 8 June 2013, at the Sunnylands estate in Rancho Mirage, California. The summit was considered "the most important meeting between an American president and a Chinese Communist leader in 40 years, since President Nixon and Chairman Mao," according to Joseph Nye, a political scientist at Harvard University. The leaders concretely agreed to combat climate change and also found strong mutual interest in curtailing North Korea's nuclear program. However, the leaders remained sharply divided over cyber espionage and US arms sales to Taiwan. Xi was dismissive of American complaints about cyber security. Tom Donilon, the outgoing US national security adviser, stated that cyber security "is now at the center of the relationship", adding that if China's leaders were unaware of this fact, they know now.

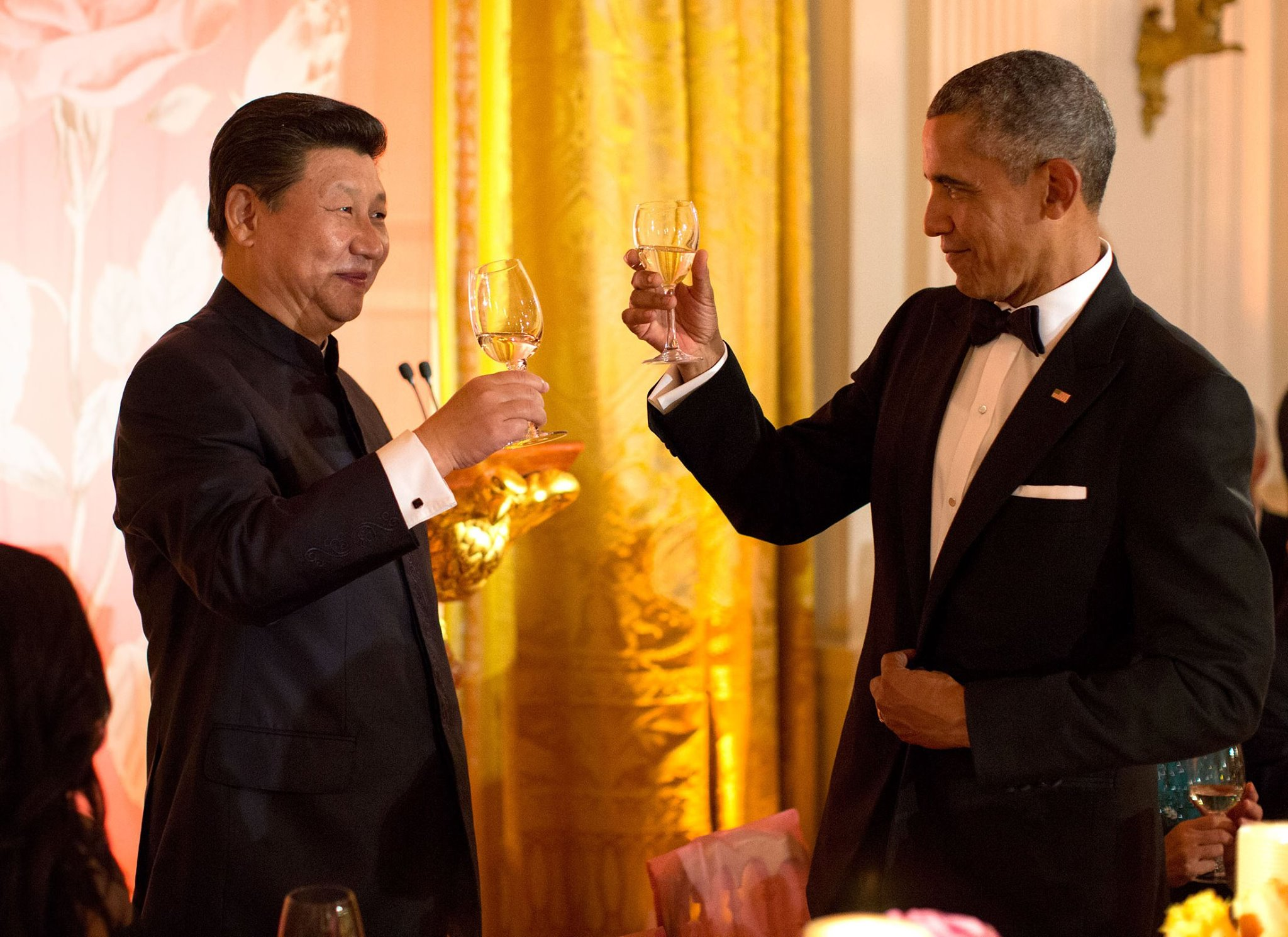
US president Barack Obama and Chinese leader Xi Jinping at the White House during Xi's state visit to the United States in September 2015

Obama supported the One-China policy. In 2014, Obama stated that "We recognize Tibet as part of the People's Republic of China. We are not in favor of independence."

Beginning in 2015, China's People's Liberation Army Air Force began patrolling the South China Sea, including the disputed Paracel and Spratly Islands. In China's view, these disputed areas are within its Air Defense Identification Zone (ADIZ). The United States Air Force does not accept this view, and flies its military planes through the area without informing China.

In May 2015, US Secretary of Defense Ashton Carter warned China to halt its rapid island-building in the South China Sea.

Obama hosted Xi for a bilateral meeting on the margins of the Nuclear Security Summit on 31 March 2016.

=== First Trump administration (2017–2021) ===
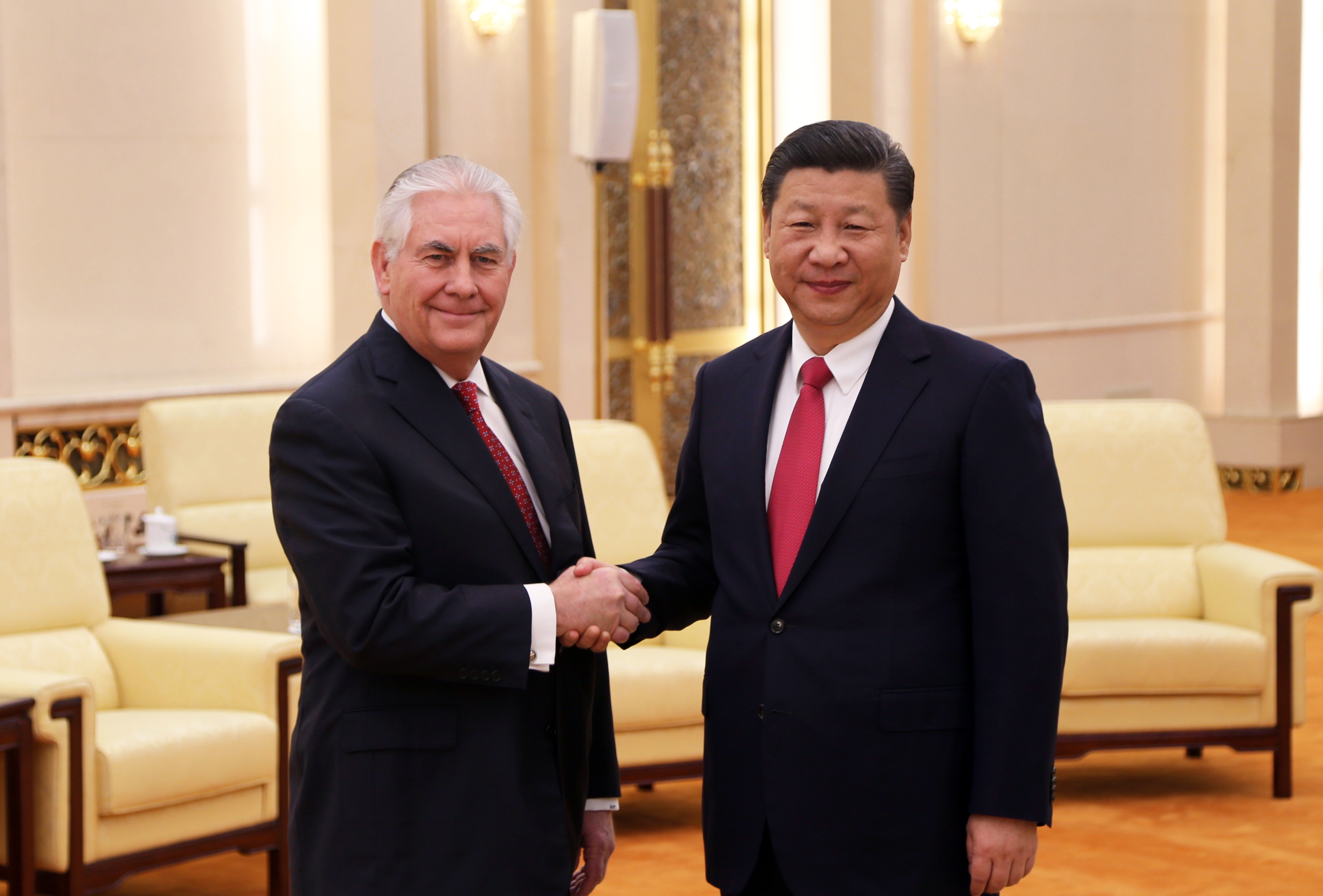
Secretary of State Rex Tillerson shakes hands with Chinese leader Xi Jinping upon arrival in Beijing, 19 March 2017.

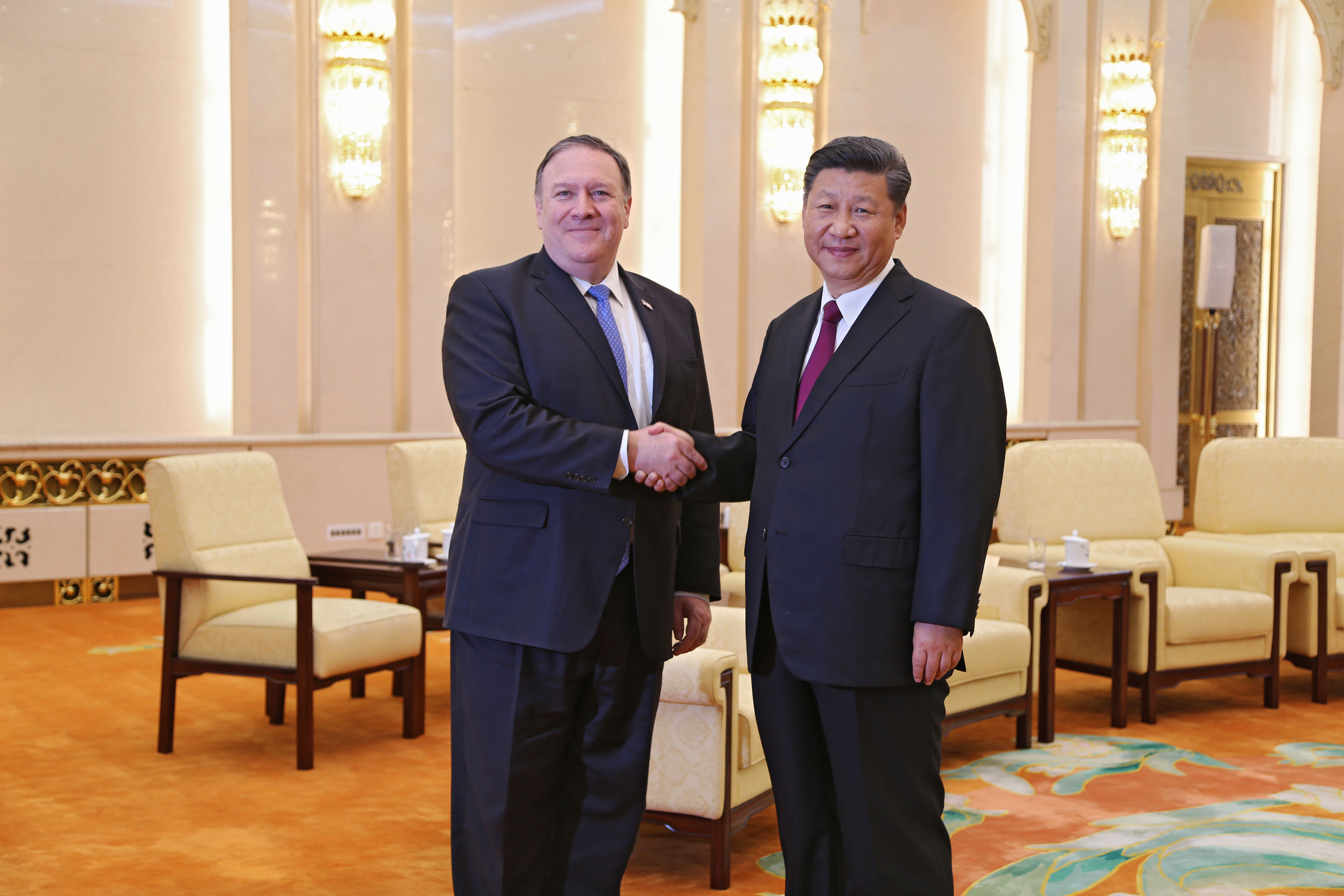
Secretary of State Mike Pompeo shakes hands with Chinese leader Xi Jinping upon arrival in Beijing, 14 June 2018.

During his presidential campaign, Donald Trump promised an assertive stance towards China. The presidency of Trump led to a negative shift in US relations with China.

President-elect Trump's telephone conversation with the president of Taiwan Tsai Ing-wen on 2 December 2016 was the first such contact with Taiwan by an American president-elect or president since 1979. It provoked Beijing to lodge a diplomatic protest ("stern representations"). Trump went on to clarify his move: "I fully understand the 'one China' policy, but I don't know why we have to be bound by a 'one China' policy unless we make a deal with China having to do with other things, including trade."

On President Trump's inauguration day, an official from the China's People's Liberation Army wrote on the official website that the American military build-up in East Asia and the Asia Pacific, and its push to arm South Korea with the THAAD missile-defense system were provocative "hot spots getting closer to ignition" and that the chances of war had become "more real."

On taking office, the Trump administration stopped negotiations on a bilateral investment treaty with China which had begun in 2008. According to Michael Froman, the lead negotiator during the preceding four years, the effort to reach an agreement was "more than 90 percent complete."

On 23 January, speaking about China's claims to sovereignty over the Spratly Islands in the South China Sea, White House spokesman Sean Spicer said, "It's a question of if those islands are in fact in international waters and not part of China proper, then yeah, we're going to make sure that we defend international territories from being taken over by one country."

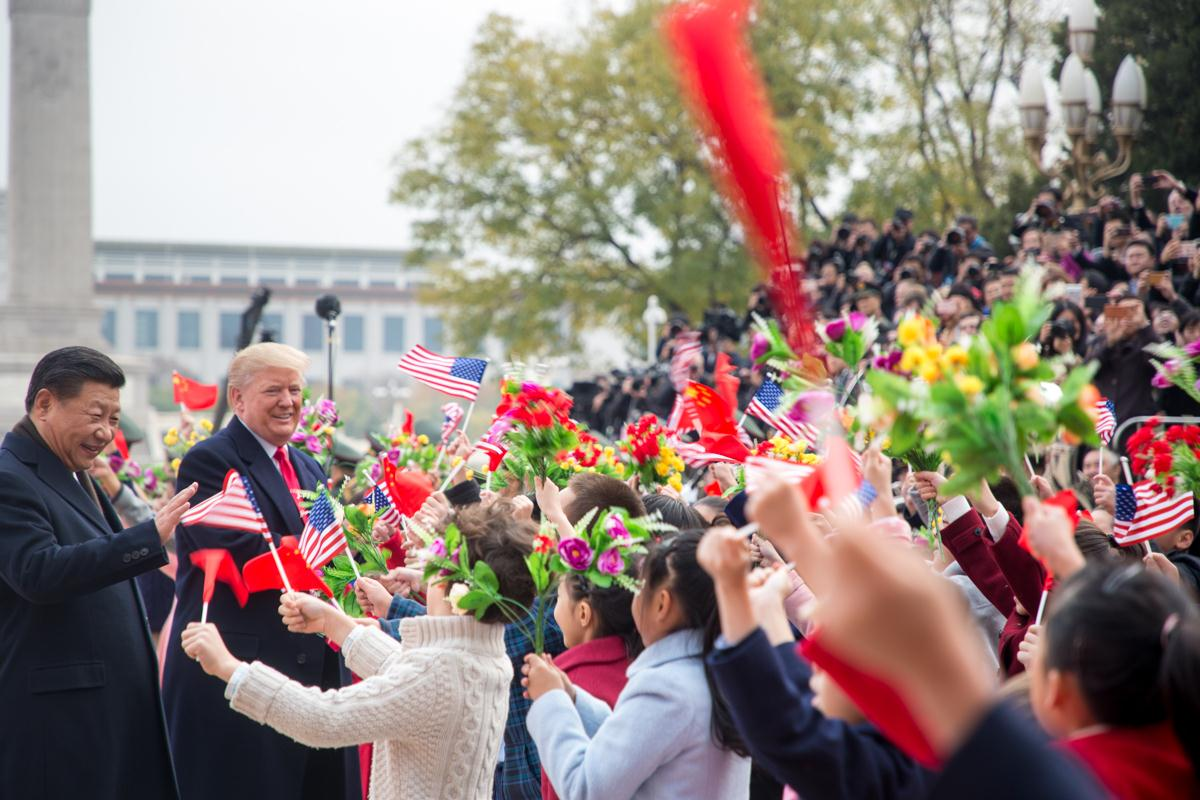
President Trump arrives in China in November 2017.

On 4 February, on a visit to Japan, US Defense Secretary James Mattis reaffirmed Washington's commitment under the Treaty of Mutual Cooperation and Security between the United States and Japan to defending Japan, including the Senkaku Islands (the East China Sea) that are claimed by China.

On 9 February, Trump spoke with China's leader Xi Jinping over the phone discussing a wide range of issues; Trump was said to have re-iterated the United States' commitment to the status quo 'one-China' policy.

In a 3 July 2017 telephone conversation with Trump, Xi stated, "China–US relations have made great progress in recent days, but they have also been affected by some negative factors." By "negative factors", Geng Shuang, a Chinese government spokesmen, explained in a televised briefing: "Under the pretext of navigational freedom, the American side once again sent military vessels into the Chinese territorial waters of Xisha (Paracel) Islands. It has violated Chinese and international law, infringed upon Chinese sovereignty, and disrupted order, peace and security of the relevant waters and put in jeopardy facilities and personnel on the relevant Chinese islands. It is a serious political and military provocation. The Chinese side is strongly dissatisfied with and firmly opposed to the relevant actions by the US."

In 2017, the Trump administration terminated the Joint Commission on Commerce and Trade (JCCT) between China and the United States. The JCCT had met annually from 1983 to 2016 and had been a generally effective mechanism to address various trade issues between the two countries. The Trump administration also terminated the Strategic and Economic Dialogue after holding the June 2017 meeting under the name "Comprehensive Economic Dialogue."

According to Chaos Under Heaven, a book by Josh Rogin, a group of officials including Peter Navarro, Stephen Miller and Steve Bannon that wanted Trump to "speed the downfall" of the Chinese Communist Party (CCP) and that "believed in economic nationalism, the return of manufacturing from abroad, and the protection of domestic industries, even at the expense of free trade" emerged during the early stage of the Trump administration. The Trump administration labelled China a "strategic competitor" in 2017.

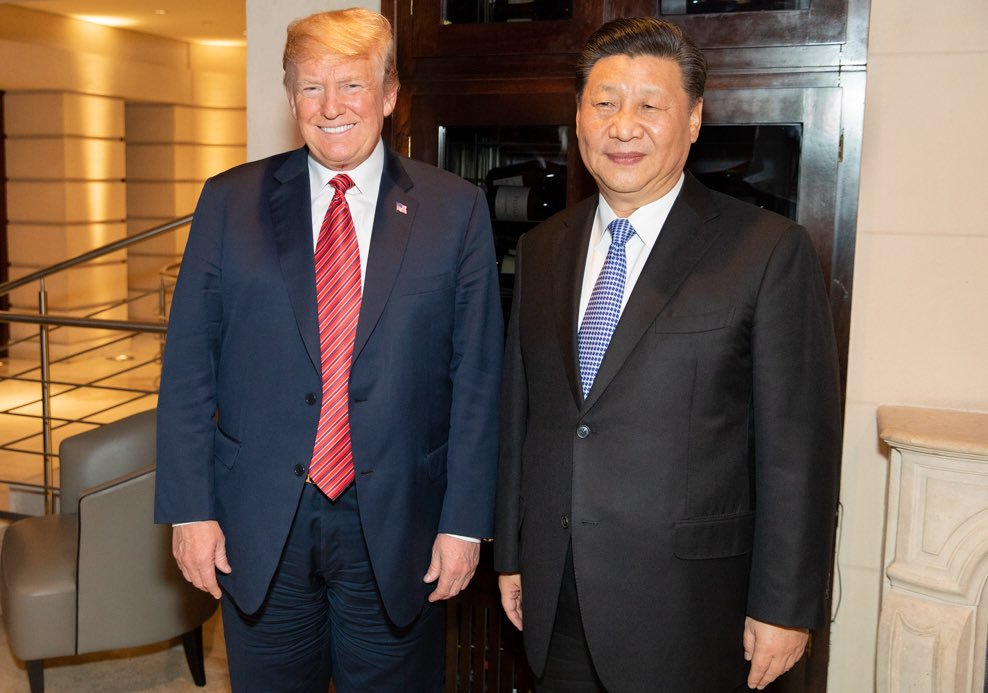
Chinese leader Xi Jinping with US president Donald Trump at the G20 summit in Buenos Aires, December 2018

China enforced punitive tariffs on 128 categories of American goods on 1 April 2018 in retaliation for the first Trump administration's national-security levies on steel and aluminum imports the previous month. The Chinese Government's response is measured, affecting $3 billion in annual trade or about 2% of US goods exports to China. By late September 2018, the Trump administration had placed tariffs (25% tax increase) on $250 billion worth of Chinese goods, in an attempt to offset the trade imbalance between the two major economic world powers.

In what put additional strain on US–China relations, Huawei's vice-chair and CFO Meng Wanzhou was arrested in Canada on 1 December 2018 at the behest of US authorities. US Senator Ben Sasse accused China of undermining US national security interests, often "using private sector entities" to by-pass US sanctions against the sale of telecom equipment to Iran.

According to political analyst, Andrew Leung, "China is perceived as the antagonist and rival of the United States," and that China's economic growth is seen as a "threat to the world order underpinned by American dominance or American values." He claimed, moreover, that the arrest of the CFO of Huawei on 1 December 2018 corresponded with the suspicious death on that same day of a leading Chinese national quantum physicist and venture capitalist at Stanford University, Shoucheng Zhang, who was on a H-1B visa, giving rise to conspiracy theories. In August 2018, the US government signed an update to legislation for the Committee on Foreign Investment in the US, broadening governmental scrutiny to vetting VC-backed, and especially Chinese state-funded, investments in US tech startups.

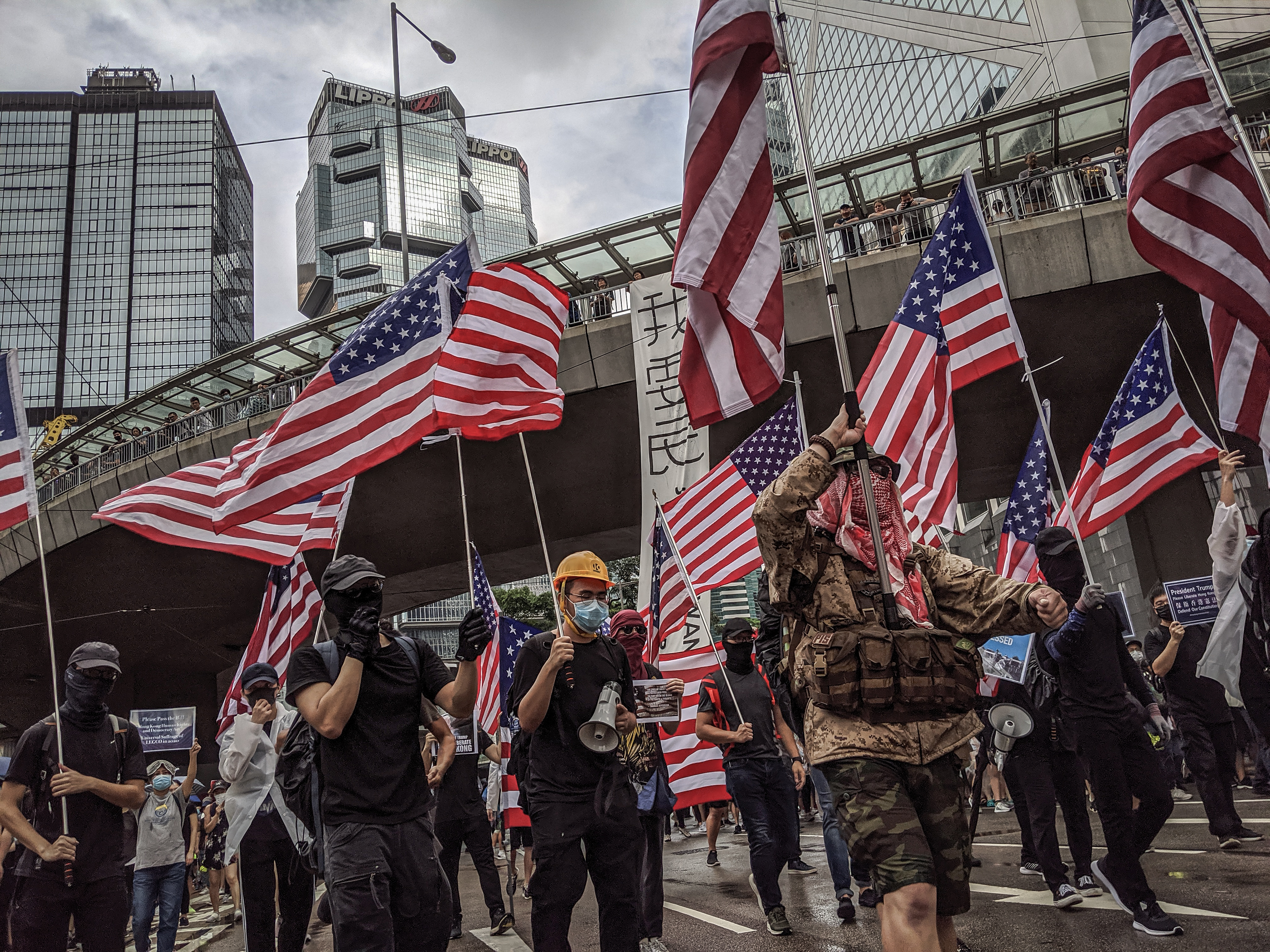
US lawmakers from both parties have voiced their support for pro-democracy Hong Kong protests in 2019.

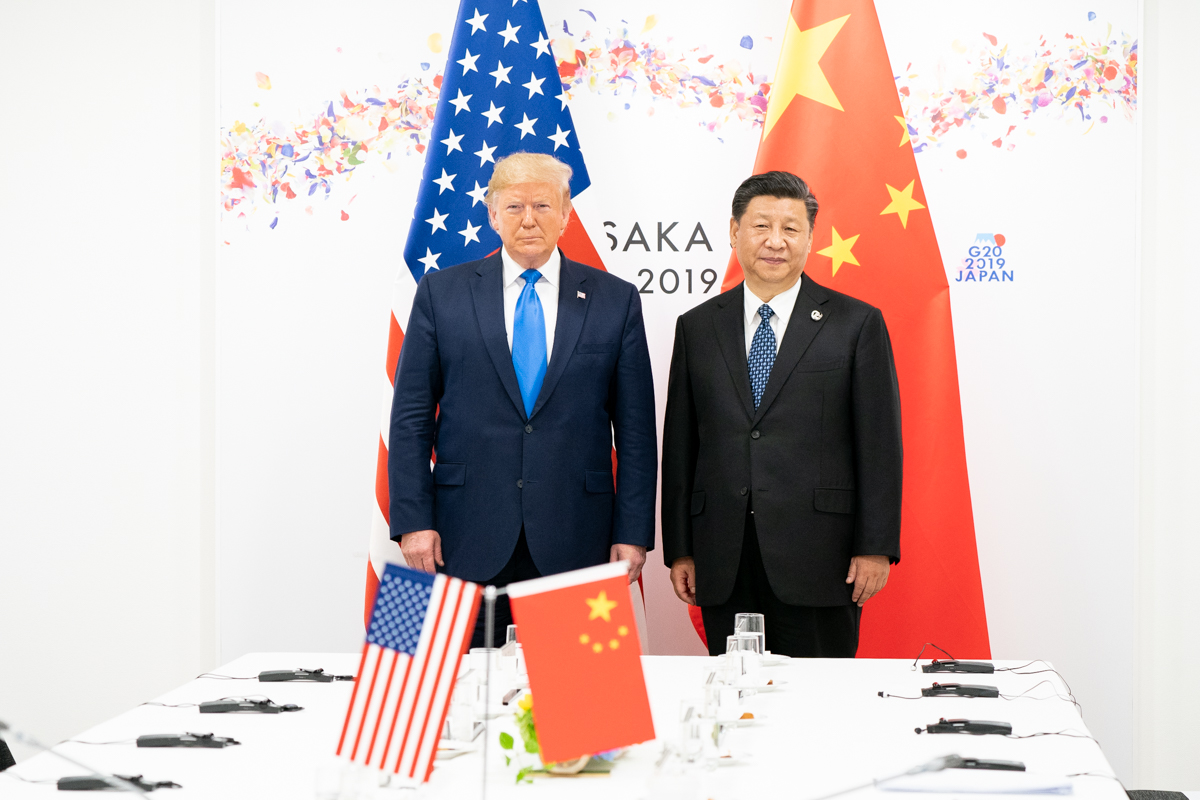
Chinese leader Xi Jinping with US president Donald Trump at the G20 summit in Osaka, June 2019

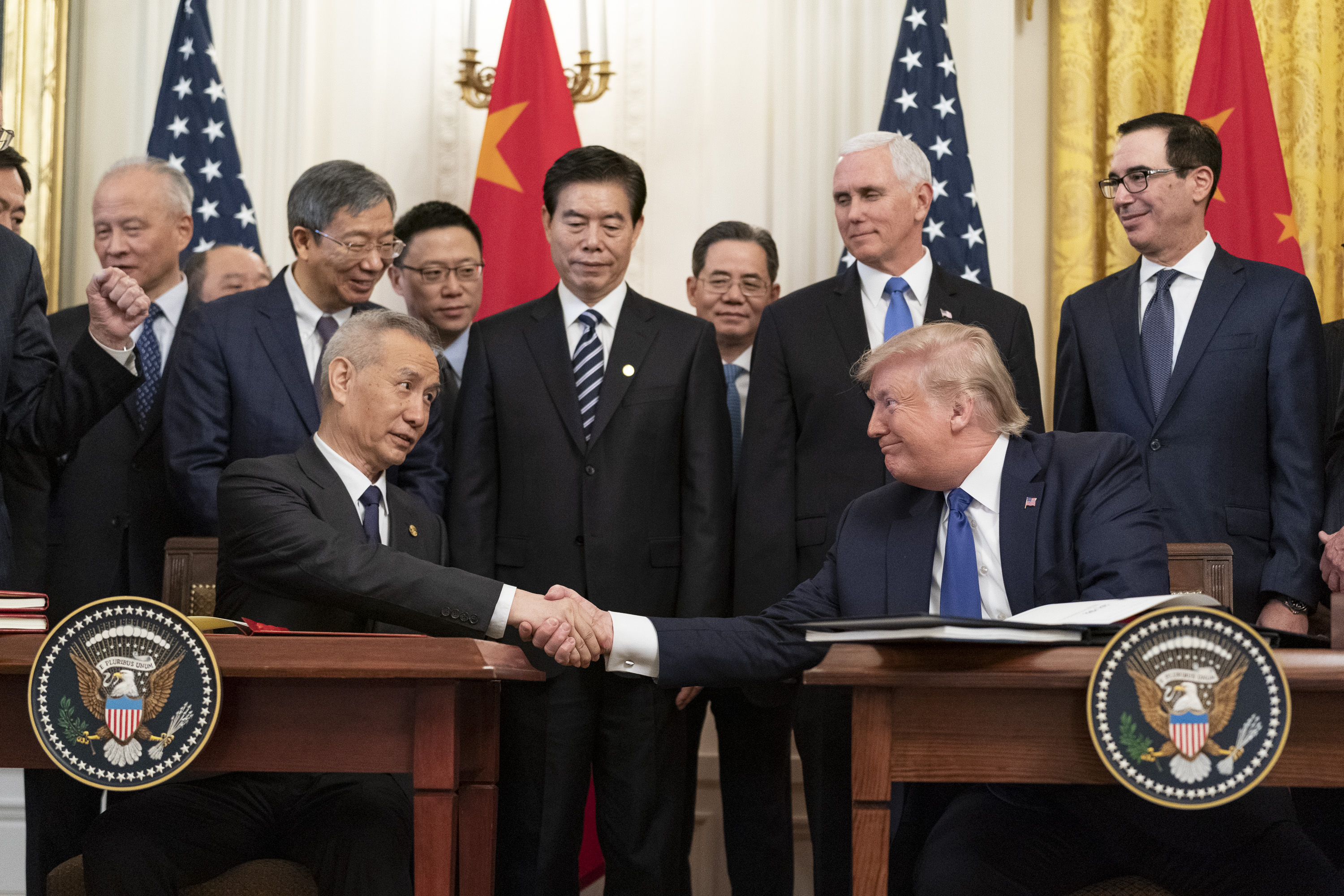
President Donald Trump and Vice Premier Liu He sign the Phase One Trade Deal in January 2020.

Both sides signed the US–China Phase One trade deal on 15 January. Unlike other trade agreements, the agreement did not rely on arbitration through an intergovernmental organization like the World Trade Organization, but rather through a bilateral mechanism.

==== Rapid deterioration of relations (2019–2020) ====
Michael D. Swaine warned in 2019, "The often positive and optimistic forces, interests, and beliefs that sustained bilateral ties for decades are giving way to undue pessimism, hostility, and a zero-sum mindset in almost every area of engagement."

The U.S.-China relationship is confronting its most daunting challenge in the forty years since the two countries established diplomatic ties. Current trends portend steadily worsening relations over the long term, with increasingly adverse consequences for all actors involved. Specifically, Beijing and Washington are transitioning from a sometimes contentious yet mutually beneficial relationship to an increasingly antagonistic, mutually destructive set of interactions. The often positive and optimistic forces, interests, and beliefs that sustained bilateral ties for decades are giving way to undue pessimism, hostility, and a zero-sum mindset in almost every area of engagement.

According to two experts on US–China relations, Rosemary Foot and Amy King, the consensus of experts is that:

The relationship began to deteriorate in the second decade of the 21st century, and that the Trump administration has accelerated the deterioration. Explanations...have ranged over a large number of factors, all of which have played some role. Some relate to changes in official personnel in both the United States and China, others to the shifts and relative power between the two countries after the 2008 financial crisis, and yet others to China's greater determination to reform global governance institutions and to play more of a global leadership role.

Foot and King emphasize China's aggressive efforts in developing cutting-edge technologies with significant military and commercial implications, while the United States sees the need to defend itself aggressively against technological theft.

US academics have made various policy prescriptions for the United States within the context of its deteriorating relationship with China.

According to Lawrence J. Lau, a major cause of the deterioration is the growing battle between China and the United States for global economic and technological dominance. More generally, he argues, "It is also a reflection of the rise of populism, isolationism, nationalism and protectionism almost everywhere in the world, including in the US." According to Ian Bremmer, the US and China are in a technology cold war and Donald Trump's technology war against the PRC has been his administration's biggest foreign policy win, saying, "on the issue of tech decoupling that it was America out front with most allies on board." According to Greg Autry, an academic at the University of Southern California, Trump's China policy was working, pointing to increased revenue intakes by the Treasury Department and offshoring by US manufacturing supply chains from China, and crediting the administration for being the first to fully recognize that globalization had not delivered for Americans and that China was an existential threat.

Former Obama administration officials Samantha Power and Susan Rice have criticized China's actions on trade, over the Meng Wenzhou affair and in Hong Kong while simultaneously criticizing the Trump administration for inadequate pushback.

In 2018, the US Department of Justice initiated a "China Initiative" to "combat economic espionage". DOJ ended the program on 23 February 2023. No one was charged or convicted of spying in any China Initiative case.

The Director of Policy Planning at the United States Department of State, Kiron Skinner drew international attention in April 2019 for stating at a foreign policy forum that the US competition with China would be especially bitter, because unlike the Cold War with the Soviet Union which is "a fight within the Western family", "it's the first time that we will have a great-power competitor that is not Caucasian".

In 2019, prominent Americans, including some with ties to the administration, formed the Committee on the Present Danger: China (CPDC) to advocate for a more hawkish foreign policy against China.

On 29 January 2020, the Interior Department's fleet of more than 800 Chinese-made drones, including those by DJI, were grounded, citing security concerns.

On 18 February 2020, the US government announced five Chinese state media firms (Note: Xinhua News Agency, China Global Television Network, distribution company of China Daily newspaper, and the distribution company of The People's Daily) would be designated "foreign missions", requiring them to be legally registered with the US government as a foreign government entity. On the following day, China took action against three American journalists with The Wall Street Journal by revoking their press credentials over a coronavirus opinion column which their paper had run. According to China, the column was racist and libelous; the CEO of the company that published the WSJ defended the article, as did the State department. A March 2020 article by Reuters said that Washington slashed the number of journalists allowed to work at US offices of major Chinese media outlets to 100 from 160 due to Beijing's "long-standing intimidation and harassment of journalists". In response, China expelled about a dozen American correspondents with The New York Times, News Corp's Wall Street Journal and the Washington Post, which prompted criticism from the State Department. On 8 May, the US moved Chinese citizens at non-American news outlets from open-ended work visas to extendable 90-day work visas and in June the State Department designated a further four Chinese media outlets as foreign embassies.

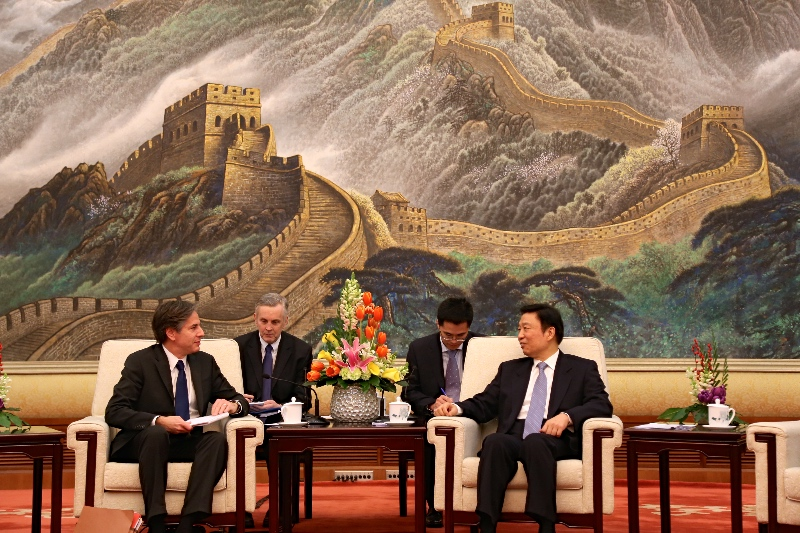
In August 2020, Joe Biden's foreign policy adviser Tony Blinken described China as a "strategic competitor".

By May 2020 relations had deteriorated as both sides were accusing the other of guilt for the worldwide coronavirus pandemic. Washington has mobilized a campaign of investigations, prosecutions and export restrictions. Beijing, meanwhile, has stepped up military activities in the contested South China Sea, and launched denunciations of American Secretary of State Mike Pompeo, and publicly speculating that the American military deliberately unleashed the virus in China. In the growing aspersion, on 15 May 2020, the US blocked shipments of semi-conductors to Huawei, while China, for its part, has threatened to place Apple, Boeing, and other US firms on "unreliable entities" lists, and has blamed the US government of using state power under the excuse of national security, and of abusing export control measures to continuously oppress and contain specific enterprises of other countries. Orville Schell, the director of the Center on US–China Relations at the Asia Society, summed up the situation as follows: "The consequences of the breakdown in US–China relations is going to be very grave for the world and for the global economy because the ability of the US and China to work together was the keystone of the whole arch of globalization and global trade. With that pulled out, there's going to be a tremendous amount of disturbance", often compared to the Cold War. However Tony Blair noted there is "an interconnectedness, economically and in trade terms between the US and China that just wasn't there in the US-Soviet Cold War" that makes it an imperfect analogy. He further felt the China–US relations would be the "determining geopolitical relationship of the 21st century."

In June 2020, US Ambassador to the United Nations Kelly Craft sent a letter to the U.N. secretary general explaining the US position on China's "excessive maritime claims".

On 17 June 2020, President Trump signed the Uyghur Human Rights Policy Act, which authorizes the imposition of US sanctions against Chinese government officials responsible for detention camps holding more than 1 million members of the country's Uyghur Muslim minority. On 9 July 2020, the Trump administration imposed sanctions and visa restrictions against senior Chinese officials, including Chen Quanguo, a member of CCP's powerful Politburo.

A research paper by the Begin–Sadat Center for Strategic Studies said that Chinese state-controlled media enthusiastically covered the protests and rioting attending the Murder of George Floyd, comparing the American protests to the protests in Hong Kong and used the rioting and violence in the United States as evidence that the democratic system was hypocritical and morally bankrupt. A report by the Australian Strategic Policy Institute said that racial tensions in the United States was a key area of focus for "a campaign of cross-platform inauthentic activity, conducted by Chinese-speaking actors and broadly in alignment with the political goal of the People's Republic of China (PRC) to denigrate the standing of the US."

In July 2020, the Trump administration ordered the closure of the Chinese consulate in Houston. In response, the Chinese government ordered the closure of the US consulate in Chengdu.

On 20 July 2020, the United States sanctioned 11 Chinese companies, restricting any trade deal with America for what the US government said was their involvement in human rights violations in Xinjiang, accusing them specifically of using Uyghurs and other Muslim minorities in forced labor.

On 23 July 2020, US Secretary of State Mike Pompeo announced the end of what he called "blind engagement" with the Chinese government. He also criticized CCP general secretary Xi Jinping as "a true believer in a bankrupt totalitarian ideology".

In August 2020, Washington imposed sanctions on 11 Hong Kong and Chinese officials over what it said was their role in curtailing political freedoms in Hong Kong through the imposition of the Hong Kong national security law; China retaliated by sanctioning 6 Republican lawmakers and 5 individuals at non-profit and rights groups.

In September 2020 the United States had under a 29 May presidential proclamation revoked more than 1,000 visas for PRC students and researchers visas who the US government said had ties to the Chinese military in order to prevent them from stealing and otherwise appropriating sensitive research.

On 26 September 2020, the US Commerce Department put restrictions on Chinese chip maker, Semiconductor Manufacturing International Corporation (SMIC), following which the suppliers were required to have an export license for exporting the chip. The restrictions were imposed after the US concluded that an "unacceptable risk" equipment supplied to SMIC could potentially be used for military purposes.

On 6 October 2020, Germany's ambassador to the UN, on behalf of the group of 39 countries including Germany, the U.K. and the US, made a statement to denounce China for its treatment of ethnic minorities and for curtailing freedoms in Hong Kong.

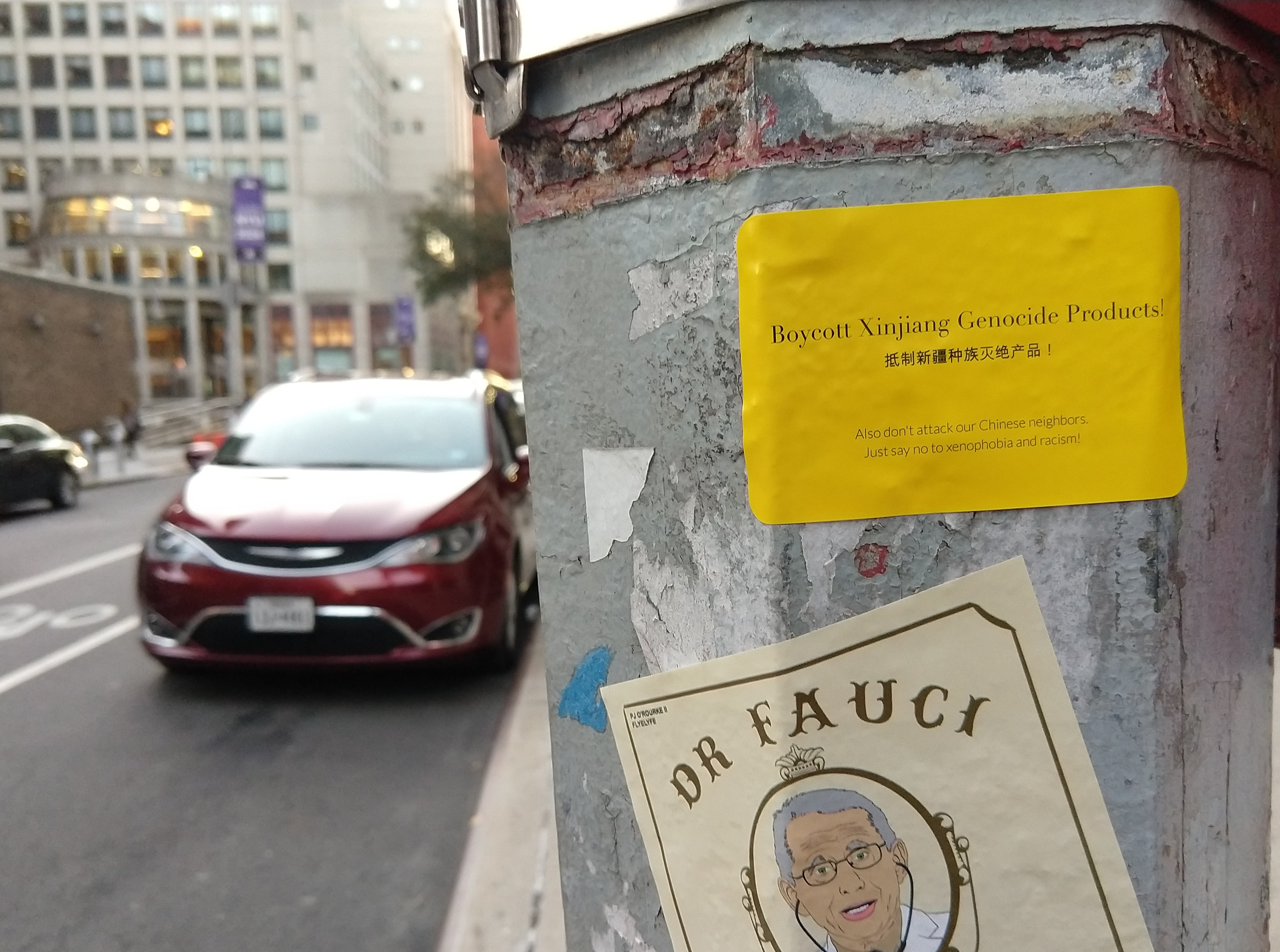
Call for boycott of products from China's Xinjiang province, New York, 2020. The US officially recognized the Chinese government's treatment of the Uyghurs in Xinjiang as a genocide.

On 9 October 2020, the Department of Justice disallowed the use of its fund to purchase DJI drones, which the DoJ classified as a "Covered Foreign Entity".

On 21 October 2020, the US approved arms sales of $1.8 billion to Taiwan. It involved three packages that included high technology weapons such as SLAM-ER missiles, HIMARS M142 Launchers and Recce Pods. On 26 October 2020, China announced its intentions to impose sanctions on US businesses and individuals, including Boeing, Raytheon and Lockheed Martin. Taiwan welcomed the arms sales and disapproved of the sanctions. Taiwan also said it would continue buying arms from America.

In a December 2020 report, US intelligence officials claimed that China had supervised a bounty program that paid Afghan militants to kill US soldiers deployed in the country.

On 5 December 2020, the US State Department ended five cultural exchange programs with China, which are—"the Policymakers Educational China Trip Program, the US–China Friendship Program, the US–China Leadership Exchange Program, the US–China Transpacific Exchange Program and the Hong Kong Educational and Cultural Program." They described these programs as soft power propaganda tools of Chinese government.

==== Espionage ====
In July 2020, FBI Director Christopher Wray called China the "greatest long-term threat" to the United States. He said that "the FBI is now opening a new China-related counterintelligence case every 10 hours. Of the nearly 5,000 active counterintelligence cases currently under way across the country, almost half are related to China."

In December 2020, an investigation by Axios was published that detailed the suspected activities of Christine Fang, a Chinese national who has been suspected by US officials of having conducted political espionage for the Chinese Ministry of State Security (MSS) while she was in the United States from 2011 to 2015. While Fang's suspected activities prior to the Axios investigation had already drawn scrutiny from federal law enforcement agencies, the subsequent reactions to its publication drew further scrutiny from politicians and the media.

Xu Zewei and Zhang Yu, Chinese hackers working under the direction of China's Ministry of State Security (MSS), conducted cyber intrusions between February 2020 and June 2021, including the large-scale "HAFNIUM" campaign exploiting Microsoft Exchange Server vulnerabilities. Targeting US universities, virologists, and law firms, they stole COVID-19 research and sensitive communications while operating through the MSS-linked company Shanghai Powerock Network Co. Ltd. In July 2025, under the Second Trump administration, a federal indictment was unsealed in the Southern District of Texas charging Xu and Zhang with conspiracy, wire fraud, unauthorized computer access, and identity theft. Xu was arrested in Italy and awaits extradition; Zhang remained at large.

=== Biden administration (2021–2025) ===
Following his election, relations with the new Biden administration in 2021 included heightened tensions over trade, technology, and human rights, particularly regarding Hong Kong, and the treatment of minorities in China. In addition international tensions regarding control of the South China Sea remained high. The Biden administration largely continued the China policies of his predecessor Donald Trump, and endorsed Mike Pompeo's report about China committing genocide against Uyghurs. However, the Biden and Xi administrations agreed to collaborate on long-term projects regarding climate change, nuclear proliferation, and the global COVID-19 pandemic.

President Biden, in his first foreign policy address, labeled China as "the most serious competitor" to the US. During his first visit to the Pentagon on 9 February 2021, Biden urged the United States Department of Defense to review its national security policy concerning China.

In 2021, the Biden administration tightened technology restrictions on China, including designating Huawei, ZTE, Hytera, Hikvision, and Dahua Technology as security threats, adding supercomputing entities to the US Entity List, expanding limits on American investment in Chinese companies tied to the military, and finalizing rules allowing the delisting of non-compliant Chinese firms from US stock exchanges.

I said that the United States' relationship with China will be competitive where it should be, collaborative where it can be, adversarial where it must be. — U.S. Secretary of State Antony Blinken, bilateral talks at the Captain Cook Hotel in Anchorage, Alaska, on March 18, 2021,

From 18 to 19 March 2021, bilateral talks in Alaska took place. Blinken and national security advisor Jake Sullivan met with CCP Politburo member Yang Jiechi and Chinese foreign minister Wang Yi. The Americans unleashed heated attacks on China's policies regarding human rights, cyberattacks, Taiwan, and its crackdown in Xinjiang and Hong Kong. The Chinese side countered by attacking the US's standing in the world and defending China's sovereign rights and model of development. In the week ahead of the talks, the administration met with US allies in Asia and imposed sanctions on senior Chinese officials amidst Beijing's contemporaneous crackdown on Hong Kong.

On 22 March 2021, in conjunction with the European Union, United Kingdom and Canada, the United States imposed sanctions against Chinese officials in relation to the human rights violations in Xinjiang. The sanctions marked the first time the Biden administration took such coordinated action against Beijing.

In June 2021, leaders of the G7 and NATO, encouraged by the United States, issued rare unanimous statements condemning China over human rights abuses, threats to Taiwan, unfair trade practices, and lack of transparency on COVID-19.

In August 2021, China tested a nuclear-capable hypersonic missile, highlighting advances in its strategic weapons program and raising concerns in Washington.

On 18 August 2021, Biden compared US commitments in Afghanistan and Taiwan, saying that the United States was bound to defend Taiwan, though officials later clarified that policy had not changed.

On 15 September 2021, the United States, the United Kingdom, and Australia formed AUKUS, a security pact under which Australia will acquire nuclear-powered submarines with US and British support, a move China denounced as "extremely irresponsible".

Biden held his first virtual meeting with Xi on 15 November 2021.

On 24 November 2021, the Biden administration invited Taiwan to attend the 'Summit for Democracy'—to be held in December 2021. China's Foreign Ministry reacted by saying it was "firmly opposed" to the invitation. Later that year, Biden signed a defense bill strengthening support for Taiwan.

In late 2021, the Biden administration announced a diplomatic boycott of the Beijing Olympics and signed the Uyghur Forced Labor Prevention Act, further highlighting US criticism of China's human rights record.

In February 2022, U.S. Representative Vicky Hartzler introduced a new bill to ban officials of the Chinese Communist Party and their families from pursuing higher education in the United States. Hartzler revealed that Xi Jinping's daughter Xi Mingze continued her studies at an American graduate school after completing her undergraduate degree at Harvard University. Hartzler pointed out that approximately 317,000 students from China were studying in the United States during the 2020–2021 academic year, including Xi Mingze, who completed her undergraduate degree at Harvard University in 2014 and re-enrolled in graduate school in 2019.

On 27 February 2022, the White House urged China to condemn Russia's invasion of Ukraine. China accused the United States of being responsible for the war in Ukraine.

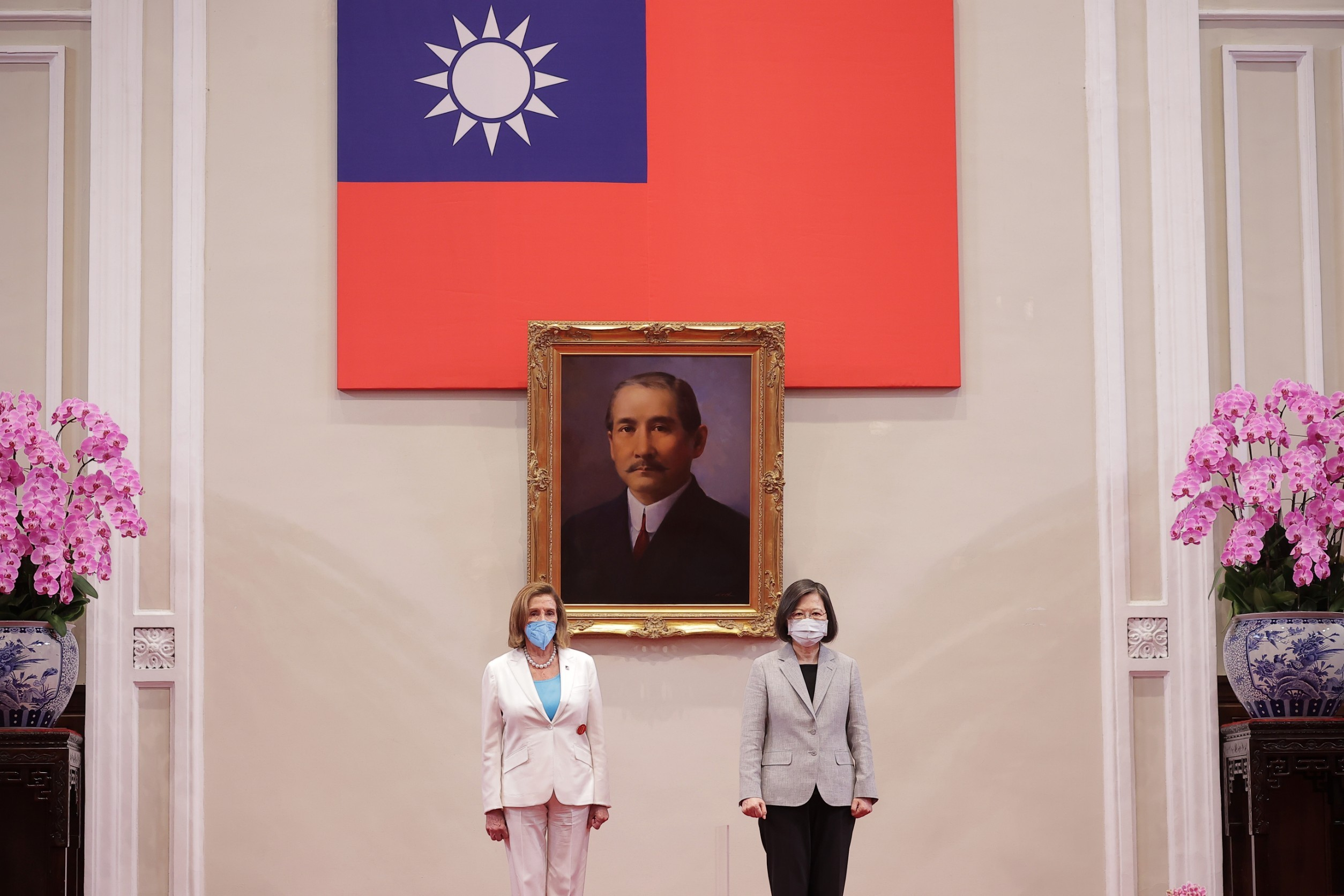
ROC president Tsai Ing-wen with US House Speaker Nancy Pelosi on 3 August 2022

On 18 March 2022, Joe Biden and Xi Jinping directly communicated with each other for the first time since Russia's invasion of Ukraine.

In May 2022, Chinese officials ordered government agencies and state-backed companies to remove personal computers produced by American corporations and replace them with equipment from domestic companies. Bloomberg said the decision was one of China's most aggressive moves to eliminate the usage of foreign technology from the most sensitive parts of its government and spur its campaign to substitute foreign technology with domestic ones.

In late May 2022, the State Department restored a line on its fact sheet on US–Taiwan relations which it removed earlier in the month and stated it did not support Taiwanese independence. However, another line which was also removed in the earlier fact sheet that acknowledged China's sovereignty claims over Taiwan was not restored while a line that stated the US would maintain its capacity to resist any efforts by China to undermine the security, sovereignty and prosperity of Taiwan in a manner that was consistent with the Taiwan Relations Act was added to the updated fact sheet.

On 11 June 2022, US Secretary of Defense Lloyd Austin condemned China's "provocative, destabilizing" military activity near Taiwan, a day after China's Defense Minister Wei Fenghe warned Austin that "if anyone dares to split Taiwan from China, the Chinese army will definitely not hesitate to start a war no matter the cost."

In July 2022, speaker of the house Nancy Pelosi announced that she would be leading a congressional delegation to the Indo-Pacific region. She has planned to visit Singapore, Malaysia, South Korea and Japan, as well as the island of Taiwan. China has responded to this by saying "it would constitute a gross interference in China's internal affairs", and continued military exercises within Chinese territories. When Pelosi visited the island the following month, the act was strongly condemned by China. As a result, China severed ties in all cooperation activities with the United States in several areas, including military matters, global climate cooperation, and drug trafficking enforcement. Later the State Department summoned Chinese ambassadors to complain about Chinese aggression. China claimed that the Pelosi visit served no other purpose than to provoke China and to deteriorate Sino-American relations while the United States, pointing to past precedent, said that Pelosi had the right to visit Taiwan and attacked the Chinese response as disproportionate. After Pelosi's departure, the PRC began military exercises encircling Taiwan.

On 7 October 2022, the US implemented new export controls targeting China's ability to access and develop advanced computing and semiconductor manufacturing items. The new export controls reflect the United States' ambition to counter the accelerating advancement of China's high-tech capabilities in these spaces to address foreign policy and national security concerns.

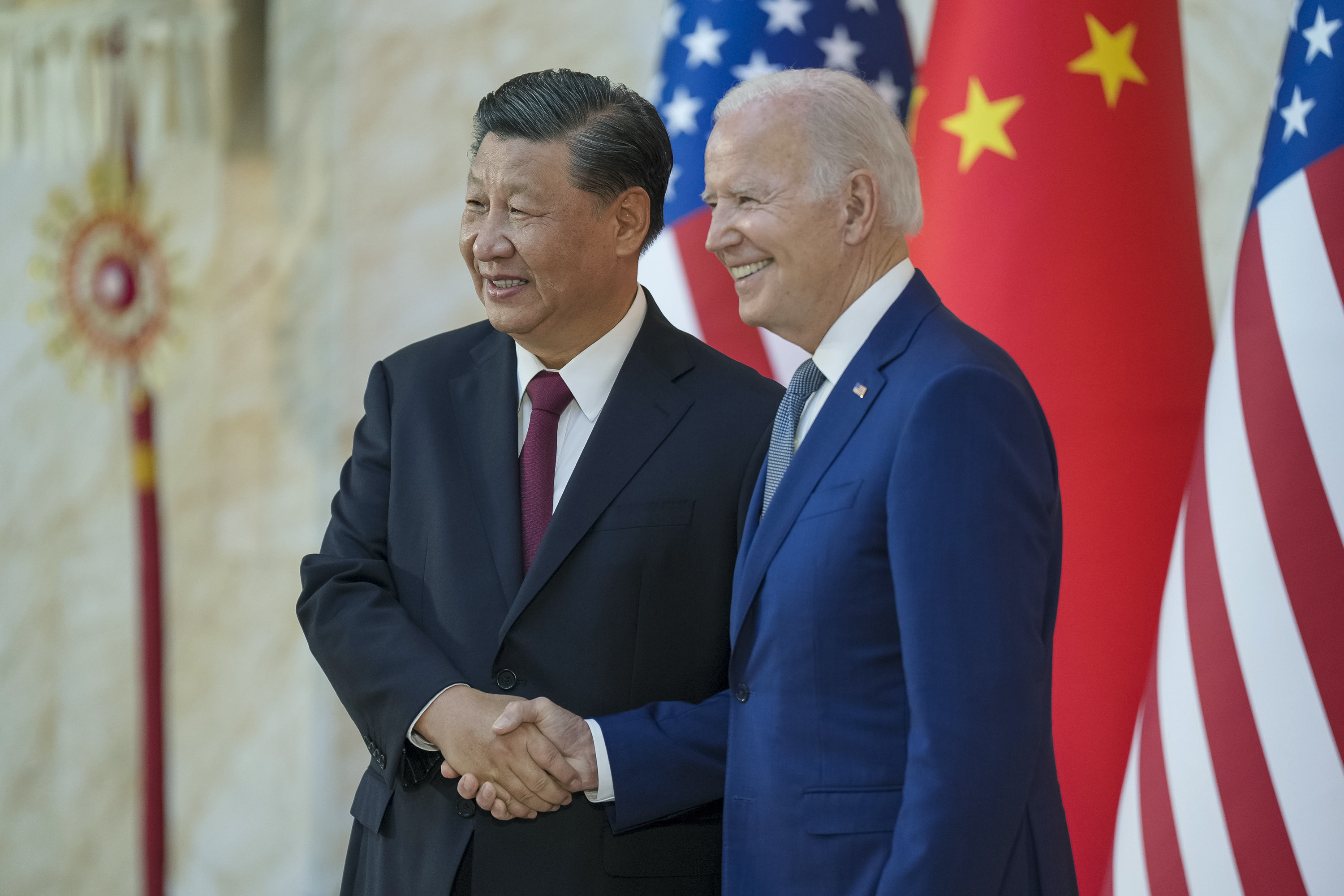
Chinese leader Xi Jinping with US president Joe Biden at the G20 summit in Bali, November 2022

On 14 November 2022, Joe Biden and Xi Jinping met on the sidelines of the G20 summit in Bali for their first in-person encounter since Biden became president. The meeting lasted for more than 3 hours and they discussed a range of issues which included tensions over Taiwan and North Korea, and the war in Ukraine.

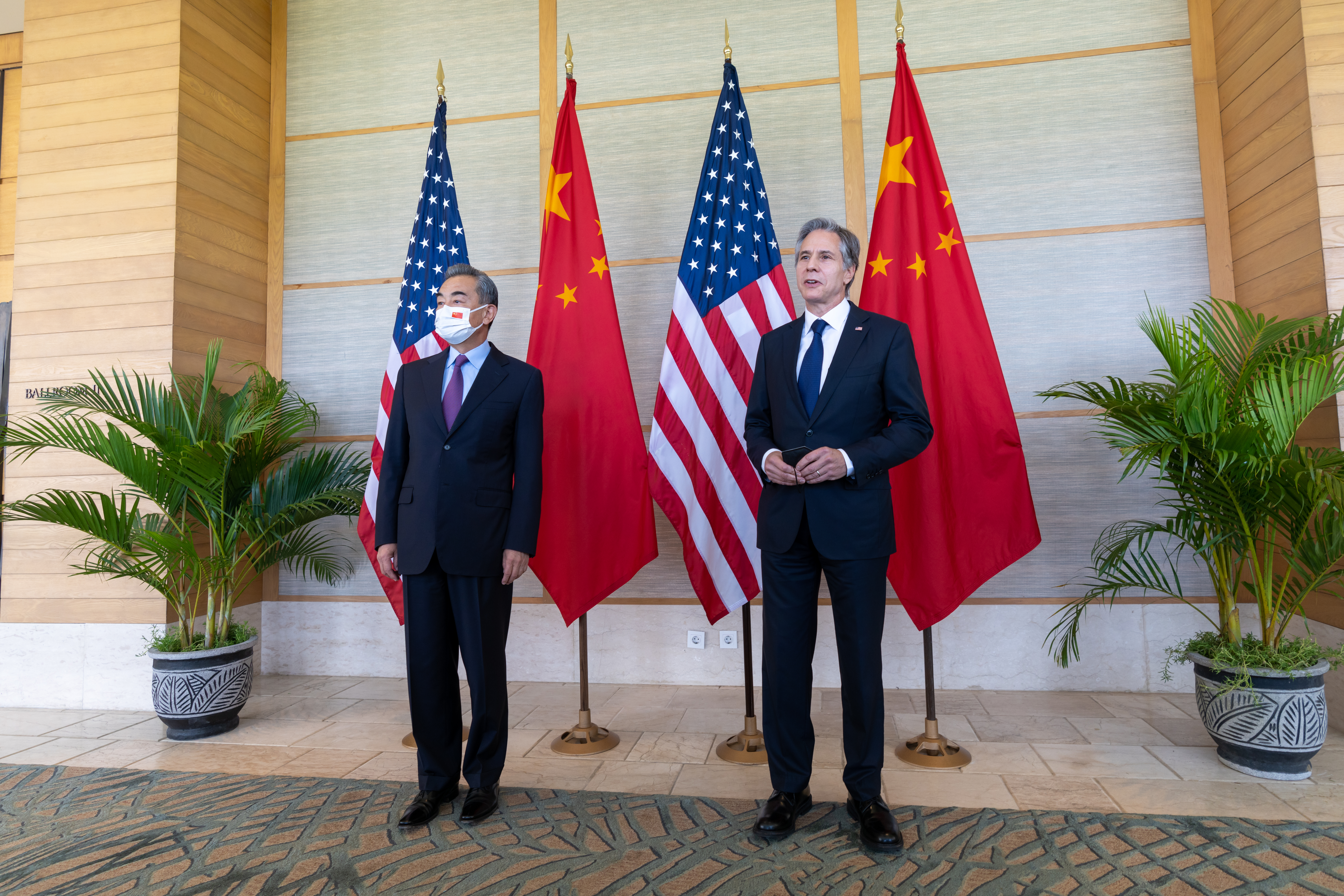
US secretary of state Antony Blinken (right) with Chinese Foreign Minister Wang Yi on 9 July 2022. Blinken dismissed China's claims to be neutral in the Russo-Ukrainian war and accused China of supporting Russia.

Some geoeconomics experts see an acceleration of the US–China rivalry as "inevitable" given the tensions manifested openly in the last months of 2022 and early 2023. In a series of interviews with BBC News and Asharq News, Nicolas Firzli, director, EU ASEAN Centre, argued that "Cold War 2 with China [was] part of the Biden Doctrine, and the only remaining point of convergence between Biden and a Republic dominated Congress [...] January 2023 is the moment when things crystalized irreversibly".

On 2 February 2023, a Chinese reconnaissance balloon was spotted flying over US airspace in the state of Montana, potentially to collect information related to nuclear silos in the area. Two days later, the United States shot it down over the Atlantic Ocean, citing national security concerns. The balloon incident followed previous Chinese government actions targeting the US, including the Chinese theft of the designs for the F-35 about fifteen years earlier and successful Chinese government-sponsored cyberattacks targeting the Office of Personnel Management security clearance files (2015), the healthcare company Anthem (2015), and the Marriott International system (2018). In 2022, the US and its allies imposed stringent additional export controls on the sale of "foundational technologies" (including advanced semiconductor chips and related technology) to China, with the aim of inhibiting any Chinese military buildup. The Biden administration has also sought to maintain critical-sector supply chains independent from China. The Beijing government expressed strong dissatisfaction and protest against the US's use of force, calling it a violation of international practice. The US claimed the balloon was a violation of its sovereignty.

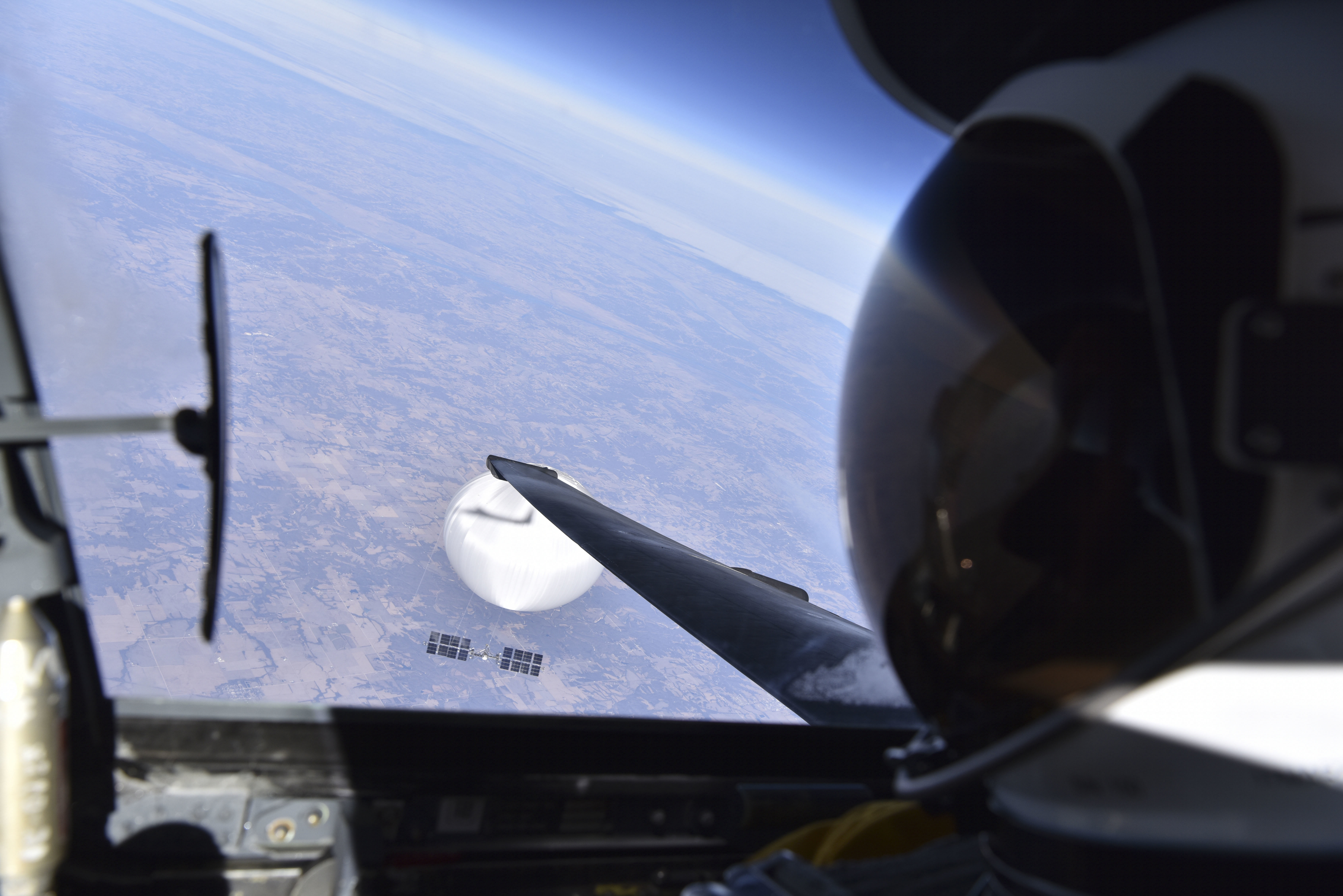
A US Air Force U-2 pilot takes a picture somewhere over the Central Continental US; the Chinese balloon is in the background.

On 11 February 2023, the US Commerce Department prohibited six Chinese companies connected to the aerospace programs of the Chinese army from acquiring US technology without authorization from the government. These six businesses include Nanjiang Aerospace Technology of Beijing; The 48th Research Institute of China Electronics Technology Group Corporation; Technology for Dongguan Lingkong Remote Sensing; Aviation Science and Technology Group of the Eagles Men; Tian-Hai-Xiang Aviation Technology in Guangzhou; together with the Shanxi Eagles Men Aviation Science and Technology Group.

In April 2023, China sanctioned US representative Michael McCaul in response to a legislative trip for Taiwanese president Tsai Ing-wen.

In May 2023, an American citizen living in Hong Kong named John Shing-Wan Leung was sentenced to life in prison on charges of espionage. Leung was arrested in 2021 by China's counterintelligence agency. On 23 September 2024, the Biden administration banned Chinese software from US internet-connected vehicles, citing national security risks. This move builds on previous actions against Chinese tech, deepening the digital divide between the two nations.

==== Attempts to fix relationship (2023–2024) ====
In mid-2023, both countries started to increase meetings between high-level officials in the hope of stabilizing the relationship; on 11 May, US national security adviser Jake Sullivan met with Wang Yi, director of the CCP Office of the Central Foreign Affairs Commission, with the topics including Taiwan and Russia's invasion of Ukraine. On 21 May, Biden commented during the G7 summit in Hiroshima that he expected a thaw in relations with China soon, commenting that the two countries were moving towards more dialogue but "this silly balloon that was carrying two freight cars worth of spy equipment was flying over the United States and it got shot down and everything changed in terms of talking to one another". On 26 May, Chinese minister of commerce Wang Wentao met with US secretary of commerce Gina Raimondo, where Raimondo raised concerns about treatment of US companies by China. US officials also announced in June that Central Intelligence Agency (CIA) director William J. Burns travelled to China in May. However, a meeting in the Shangri-La Dialogue between Chinese minister of national defense Li Shangfu and US secretary of defense Lloyd Austin failed to take place, after China rebuffed US requests to meet. In late June 2023, Blinken traveled to China and met with Xi; subsequent public statements by both countries were largely positive, with Xi and Blinken emphasizing that both sides have a responsibility to manage relations. However, relations became more contentious after Biden called Xi a "dictator".

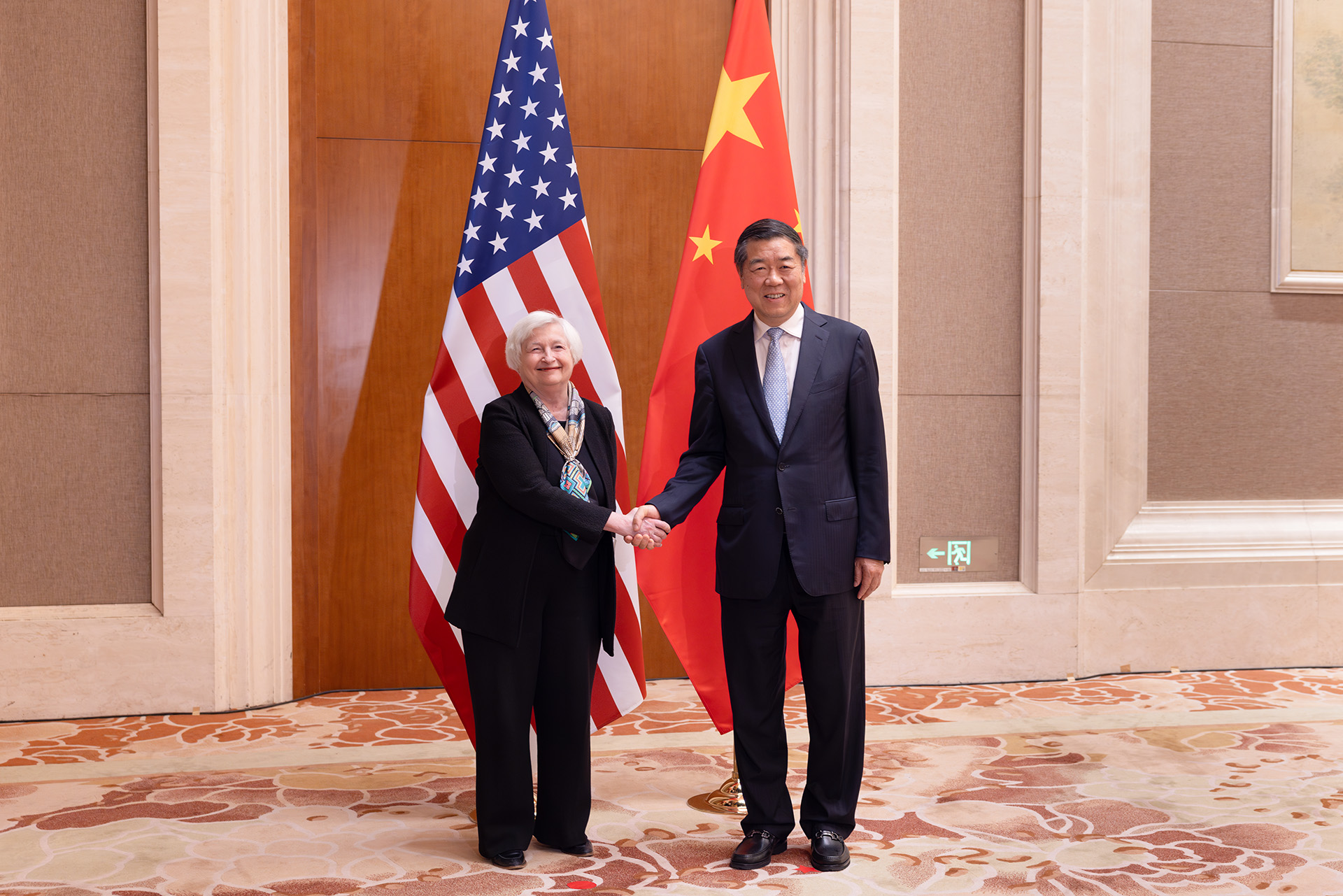
US treasury secretary Janet Yellen meeting with Vice Premier He Lifeng during Yellen's trip to Beijing, 8 July 2023

From 6 to 9 July 2023, US Treasury Secretary Janet Yellen visited China for the first time in that role; it was also the first visit by a US Treasury secretary in four years. During the visit, she met with various Chinese officials, including former vice premier Liu He, governor of the People's Bank of China (PBC) Yi Gang, minister of finance Liu Kun, CCP secretary of PBC Pan Gongsheng, vice premier He Lifeng, and premier Li Qiang. During her visit to, Yellen criticized China's treatment of American companies with foreign connections, stating to Li Qiang: "We seek healthy economic competition that is not winner-take-all but that, with a fair set of rules, can benefit both countries over time." She also said that the US national security restrictions on investment in China were intended to be narrowly focused and not have broad effects on the Chinese economy.

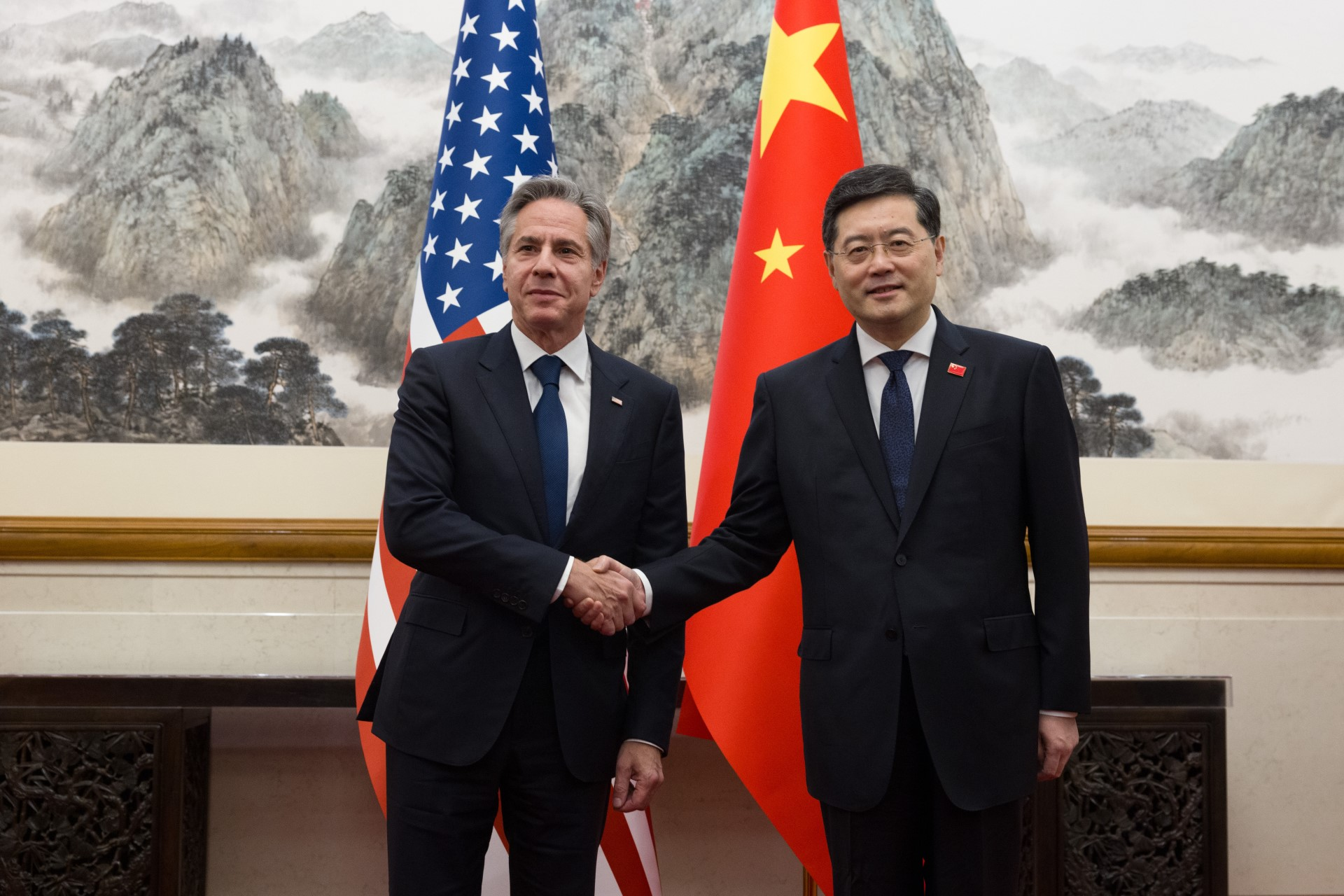
Antony Blinken with Chinese Foreign Minister Qin Gang in Beijing, 18 June 2023

On 13 July 2023, Secretary of State Antony Blinken met the Director of the Office of the Central Commission for Foreign Affairs Wang Yi in Jakarta at the ASEAN Post-Ministerial Conference at the request of Blinken to discuss the removal of obstacles that complicate US–China relations, such as the Taiwan question and sanctions the US is imposing against China's high-technology sector, as well as to promote the pragmatic approach with regard to regional cooperation. Former Minister of Foreign Affairs of China Qin Gang had just been replaced by his predecessor Wang Yi due to an extramarital affair of Gang in July of the same year. This meeting also paved the way for a further encounter of China's top diplomat Wang Yi before year's end when he will be invited to meet Blinken in Washington DC. Later on the sidelines of the U.N General Assembly (UNGA) in NY on 26 September, Vice-President Han Zheng met with US secretary of state Antony Blinken to further nurture the strained bilateral ties of both superpowers. The absence of Xi Jinping at the 2023 G20 New Delhi summit in India on 9 and 10 September was regretful, according to a statement by US president Joe Biden, however, recent news reports indicate that both CCP General Secretary Xi as well as CCP Foreign Affairs Commission Office Director Wang Yi will meet Biden and Blinken before year's end to hopefully ease the strained relations between the two nations.

Yellen's visit was followed by a visit by United States secretary of commerce Gina Raimondo between 27 and 30 August, where she met minister of culture and tourism Hu Heping, minister of commerce Wang Wentao, vice premier He Lifeng, and premier Li Qiang. Raimondo also visited Shanghai, where she met with Shanghai Communist Party secretary Chen Jining, and visited Shanghai Disneyland. During the meeting, the two sides announced a working group on commercial issues and an export control enforcement "information exchange" dialogue. The working group, upon its launch on 22 September 2023, was divided into two segments: one economic subgroup and one financial subgroup.

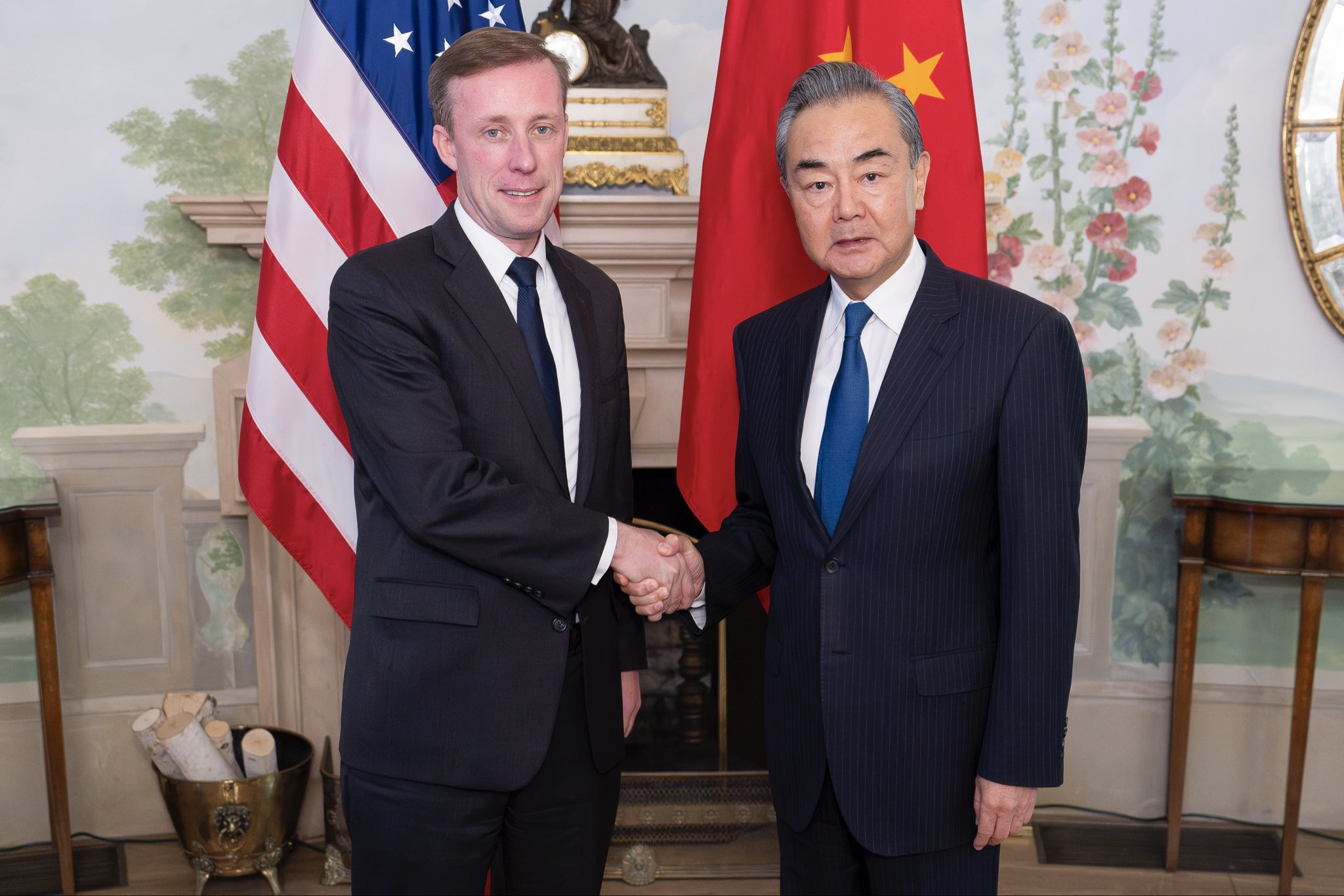
Biden's national security advisor Jake Sullivan with CCP Foreign Affairs Commission Office director Wang Yi, 28 October 2023

On 2 November 2023, a report from The Wall Street Journal was released saying that the US and China would hold nuclear arms talks, a rarity, ahead of Xi Jinping's visit to the United States.

At the beginning of November 2023, insiders cautiously expressed hope for a climate agreement between China and United States ahead of the 2023 United Nations Climate Change Conference, similar to the agreement of 2014 which paved the way for the Paris Agreement. One contentious topic is a plan for reduction of methane emissions in China. According to China's climate envoy Xie Zhenhua "progress on a plan reflected the state of US–China relations." Another is a reduction in coal use in China. China says it expands coal use for improving energy security, even though many think there are better ways to improve it. Talks between Janet Yellen and He Lifeng yielded a decision to enhance cooperation between China and the United States in several domains, including climate, debt relief. Much is expected from the meeting between Joe Biden and Xi Jinping. According to Kate Logan from the Asia Society Policy Institute, cooperation between the two countries, can "set the stage for a successful outcome at the COP28".

On 15 November 2023, President Joe Biden met with Xi Jinping at the 2023 APEC Summit in San Francisco. This was speculated to be their last meeting of 2023 before Biden's 2024 reelection campaign.

The US and China resumed semi-official nuclear arms talks in March 2024, with China reassuring the US it would not use nuclear weapons over Taiwan and reaffirming its no-first-use policy. Despite broader tensions, both sides plan to continue discussions in 2025.

In October 2024 American drone maker Skydio was sanctioned by China after its products were approved for use by fire departments in Taiwan. The Chinese government forbade components suppliers and other businesses in China from doing business with Skydio.

In November 2024, John Moolenaar, chairman of the United States House Select Committee on Strategic Competition between the United States and the Chinese Communist Party, introduced legislation to revoke PNTR status for the People's Republic of China. The same month, the United States–China Economic and Security Review Commission unanimously recommended revocation of China's PNTR status.

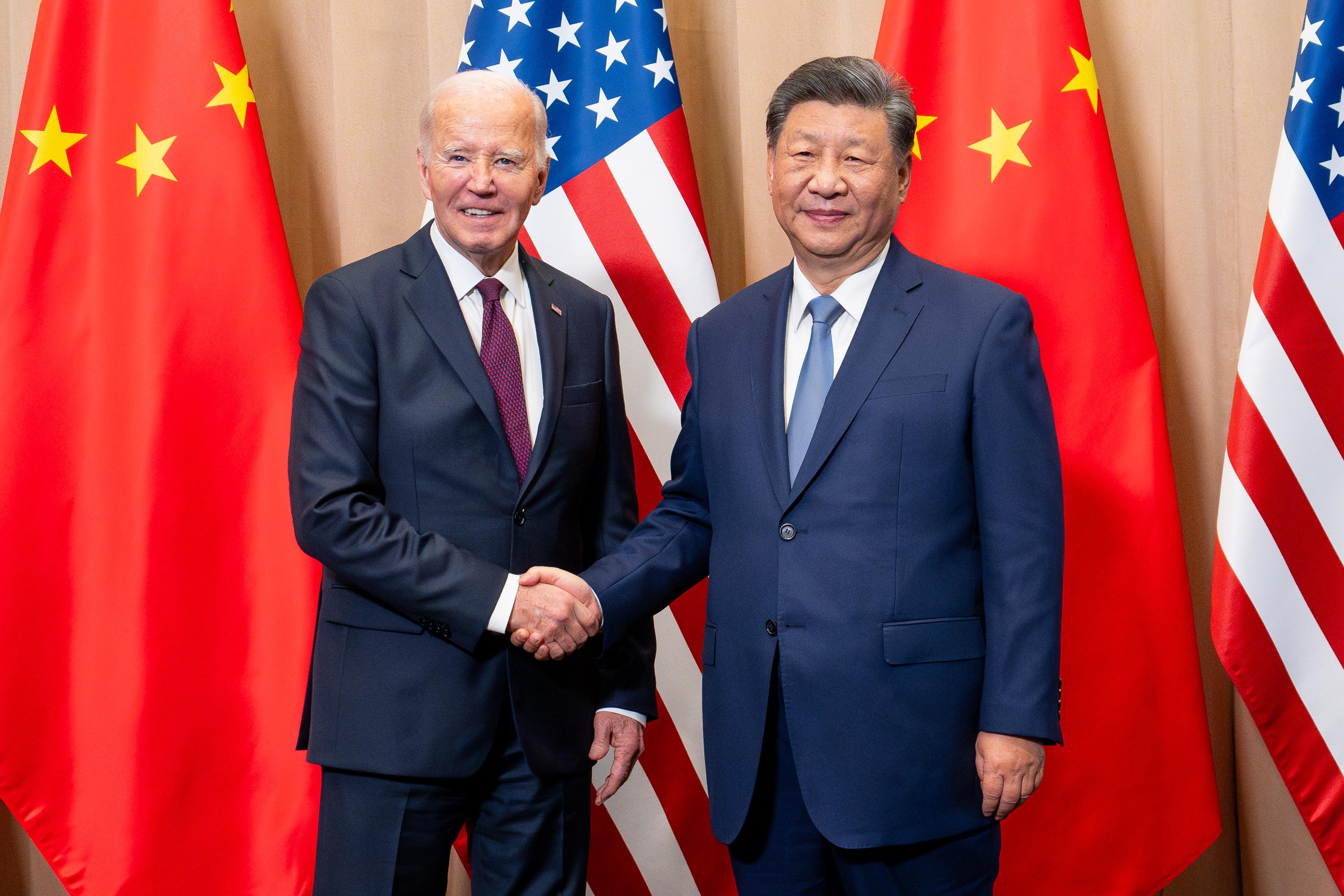
Chinese leader Xi Jinping with US president Joe Biden at the APEC summit in Lima, November 2024

On 16 November 2024, Xi Jinping and Joe Biden met on the sidelines of the APEC summit in Lima. They discussed stabilizing US–China relations at APEC summit in Lima, as Trump's return raises concerns over potential trade and Taiwan tensions. Beijing seeks dialogue but braces for challenges.

On 1 December 2024, China condemned a US arms sale to Taiwan, valued at $385 million, which included F-16 jet parts and radar support. The sale was approved by the US just before Lai Ching-te began a Pacific tour with stops in Hawaii and Guam. China criticized the sale for encouraging Taiwan's independence and damaging US–China relations, and objected to Lai's US transit, calling him a "separatist." Despite the lack of formal diplomatic ties, the US is required by law to assist Taiwan in defending itself, which continues to provoke Beijing. Taiwan rejects China's claims of sovereignty. After Washington announced more military aid and sales to Taiwan, China called it "playing with fire" and said such actions by the United States contradict the solemn commitments of its leaders not to support Taiwan independence.

On 2024, China began an extensive ocean-mapping effort across the Pacific, Indian, and Arctic Oceans using research vessels. While described as scientific surveys, experts note the data could also support submarine operations, raising concerns about strategic and security implications for other countries in key maritime regions.

=== Second Trump administration (2025–present) ===
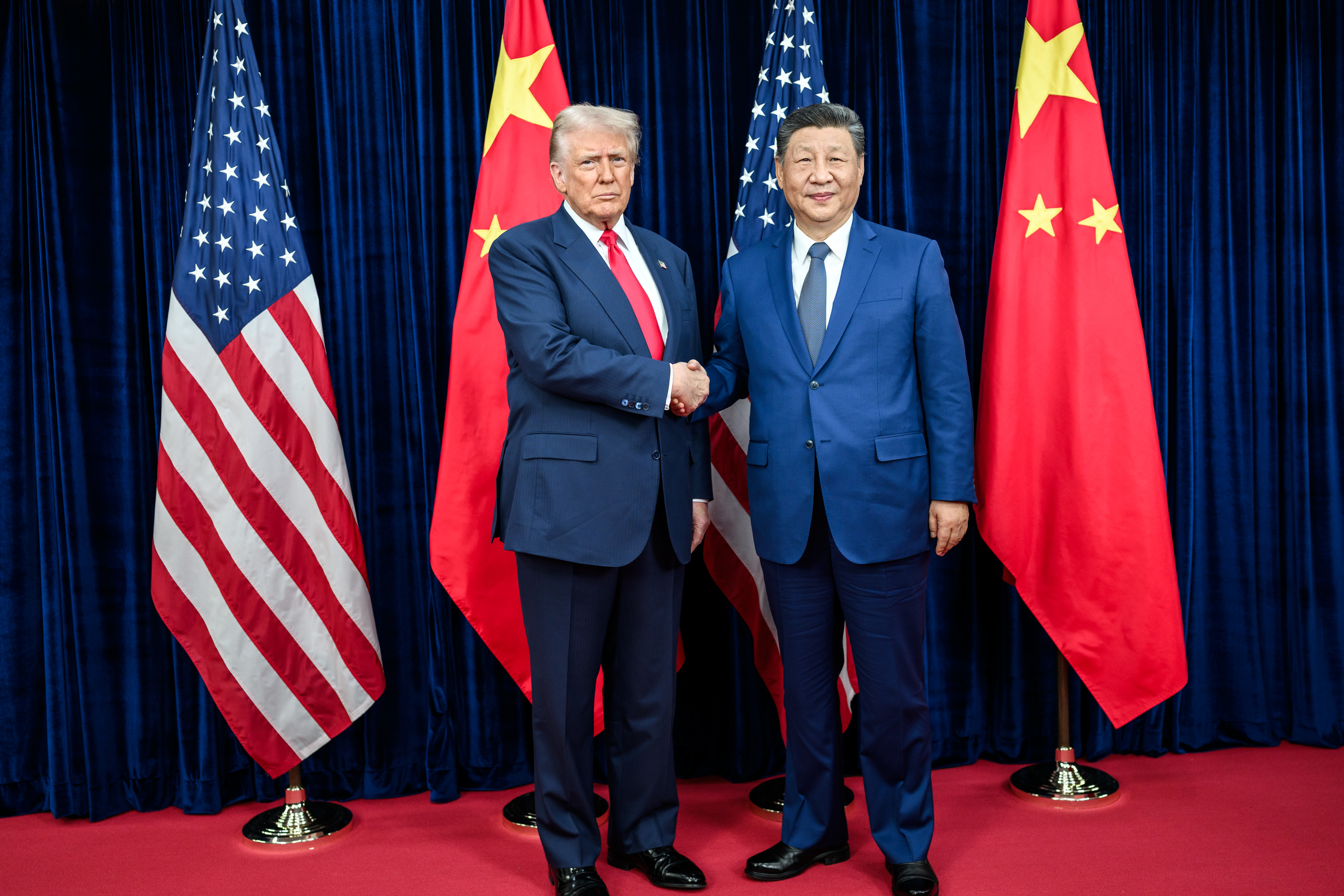
Chinese leader Xi Jinping with US president Donald Trump at the Busan Summit in Busan, October 2025

Following his second election victory as President of the United States in November 2024, Donald Trump nominated Florida Senator Marco Rubio as Secretary of State and Representative Mike Waltz as National Security Advisor in his second administration. According to Neil Thomas, a fellow in Chinese politics at the Asia Society Policy Institute's Center for China Analysis, the selection of Rubio and Waltz—both known as hardliners on China—signals that Trump's foreign policy will prioritize China above all else. Just before Trump's second inauguration in January 2025, Vice President JD Vance and ally Elon Musk each held separate meetings with China's vice president Han Zheng, who was in Washington attending the event as China's paramount leader Xi Jinping's special representative. Han's presence at the capitol was seen by commentators as representative of Xi's interest in strengthening the two countries' relationship under Trump's tenure.

In March 2025, China denounced G7 statements accusing it of destabilizing maritime security, highlighting ongoing diplomatic friction. On 23 March 2025, Chinese Premier Li Qiang met with US Senator Steve Daines, a Trump ally, in Beijing. Li emphasized the need for dialogue over confrontation, while Daines carried Trump's "America First" agenda, particularly on trade and fentanyl issues. The US imposed 20% tariffs on Chinese imports, prompting Beijing to retaliate with 15% duties on American farm goods. China maintained that economic cooperation was vital and opposed US pressure over fentanyl controls.

Trump blamed China for the opioid crisis in the United States. He said the tariffs are intended to pressure China to do more to stop the flow of fentanyl into the US. Opioids, predominantly fentanyl, have killed over 500,000 Americans since 2012. On 18 April 2025, the US State Department accused China's Chang Guang Satellite Technology of providing satellite imagery to Iran-backed Houthi forces, allegedly aiding attacks on US and international vessels in the Red Sea. Officials described the support as ongoing and "unacceptable", despite prior US diplomatic engagement with Beijing.

Under the directive published by the US State Department in 2025, the Chinese leader should be referred to as "General Secretary of the Chinese Communist Party", rather than "President of China" reflecting the supremacy of the party over the state.

In June 2025, a majority of US senators supported secondary sanctions against Russia over Vladimir Putin's unwillingness to agree to a ceasefire in Ukraine, which would impose 500% tariffs on countries that buy Russian oil, natural gas, uranium and other exports. China is one of the major consumers of Russian energy.

Liu Jianchao, head of the International Department of the Chinese Communist Party, criticized US Defense Secretary Pete Hegseth during an address at the 13th World Peace Forum in Beijing, accusing him of promoting "hegemonic thinking" and inciting confrontation. Liu's comments followed Hegseth's call for US allies to strengthen their militaries to counter China and his warning that Beijing was preparing to use military force to alter the balance of power in Asia. Liu rejected these remarks, emphasized China's commitment to "peaceful reunification" with Taiwan, and stated that China would firmly oppose any moves toward Taiwanese independence. The exchange highlighted ongoing tensions between China and the United States over Taiwan, regional security, and broader geopolitical disputes.

In October 2025, Trump cited proximity to China's nuclear facilities for demanding Afghanistan the access to Bagram Airfield which was vacated in 2021. In an interview, he also claimed that China, among other countries, was secretly testing nuclear weapons and that "they don't have reporters" to write about it. While Trump stated that the US would resume nuclear tests, China denied any clandestine nuclear testing.

In December 2025, the second Trump administration released its National Security Strategy. Regarding China, the document calls to "rebalance America's economic relationship with China, prioritizing reciprocity and fairness to restore American economic independence" but also states "trade with China should be balanced and focused on non-sensitive factors" and favors "maintaining a genuinely mutually advantageous economic relationship with Beijing". It states the US wants to prevent war in the Indo-Pacific, and states the US "will build a military capable of denying aggression anywhere in the First Island Chain". Regarding Taiwan, the document states that "deterring a conflict over Taiwan, ideally by preserving military overmatch, is a priority" and that the US "does not support any unilateral change to the status quo in the Taiwan Strait".

During the 2026 Iran war, Trump warned China not to ship weapons to Iran, warning them that they will have 'big problems' if they do. China rejected the reports that it was sending weapons to Iran. Trump later stated that China agreed not to send weapons to Iran.

In July 2026, the U.S. Federal Communications Commission (FCC) announced restrictions on certain advanced robots and connected power inverters linked to China, citing national security concerns. In September 2026, the U.S. Department of State issued a Level 2 travel warning for U.S. citizens going to China, citing the risk of exit bans. In October 2026, Department of State added a risk of wrongful detention to its travel warning for China.

==== Espionage cases ====
During the second Trump administration, the United States saw a series of high-profile espionage and cyber espionage cases linked to the Chinese government. These cases, from the perspective of the United States, illustrate ongoing concerns over the activities of China's Ministry of State Security (MSS), including efforts to infiltrate US institutions and conduct state-sponsored cyber operations.

In March 2025, the US intelligence community's Annual Threat Assessment identified China as the top military and cyber threat, citing its growing capabilities to seize Taiwan, conduct cyberattacks, and challenge US dominance in AI and space. Director of National Intelligence Tulsi Gabbard called China the "most capable strategic competitor", while Beijing released a counter-report accusing the US of long-term cyber espionage.

In 2026, US authorities convicted Lu Jianwang and Arcadia Mayor Eileen Wang for acting as unauthorized agents of the Chinese government, following investigations into overseas Chinese "police stations" and propaganda activities. This shows China's efforts to monitor dissidents and influence Chinese communities abroad, reflecting broader concerns over Beijing's global surveillance, suppression of critics, and coercive tactics against perceived opponents.

===== Cyber espionage =====
In 2025, US charged at least 12 hackers in the month of March alone. The hackers reportedly sold data of US-based dissidents to the Chinese government.

In early March 2025, for example, the United States Department of Justice indicted Chinese nationals Yin Kecheng (尹可成) and Zhou Shuai (周帅) for cyberattacks linked to APT27 (also known as Silk Typhoon). Between 2011 and 2024, they allegedly hacked US defense contractors, tech firms, and government agencies to steal data for profit and on behalf of China's Ministry of State Security (MSS) and Ministry of Public Security (MPS). Zhou also collected data on telecommunications, border activity, and individuals in media, civil service, and religion under MSS guidance. The case highlighted China's state-backed hacking-for-hire model. US authorities seized related infrastructure and sanctioned Zhou, his company Shanghai Heiying, and previously Yin.

In July 2025, the United States Department of Justice charged two Chinese nationals, Yuance Chen and Liren "Ryan" Lai, with attempting to recruit US military personnel and gather naval intelligence on behalf of China's Ministry of State Security (MSS). According to the FBI, Lai cultivated Chen as an asset due to his contacts within the US military, and both men met with MSS agents abroad to coordinate their activities. In 2022, they conducted a dead drop by leaving a backpack containing $10,000 in cash in a California locker as payment for intelligence. The charges, filed under the Foreign Agent Registration Act (FARA), highlight growing US concerns over Chinese efforts to infiltrate military institutions and expand naval capabilities.

In October 2025, China's Ministry of State Security (MSS) accused the United States of conducting a large-scale cyberattack on China's National Time Service Center. According to the agency, the US National Security Agency (NSA) had launched a series of hacking operations since March 2022, extracting sensitive data by exploiting vulnerabilities in the center's mobile phones and internal networks. According to Chinese state media, more than 42 specialized tools and pieces of malware were used during the operation, and attempts were also made to access the "Precise Ground Timing" system. China's Ministry of National Security warned that intrusions into such infrastructure could disrupt communications, financial systems, energy, transportation, and space launches.

===== Military espionage =====
In July 2025, Chenguang Gong, a dual US–China citizen and former engineer at a California defense contractor, pleaded guilty to stealing over 3,600 sensitive files related to US missile detection and defense systems. Prosecutors stated he had long sought involvement in Chinese government Talent Programs and attempted to transfer military-grade technology to China.

==== 2025 trade war ====
In April 2025, China imposed a 34% tariff on all US imports, matching the rate introduced by President Donald Trump earlier that week. The move came after two rounds of 10% US tariffs were implemented in February and March 2025, with the US citing China's alleged role in the fentanyl crisis. In retaliation, China also restricted exports of rare-earth elements, filed a complaint with the World Trade Organization, and blacklisted several US firms. Additional measures included suspending imports from American agricultural and food producers and launching an anti-monopoly probe into DuPont China. Analysts noted this marked a significant escalation in the ongoing trade tensions, reducing prospects for near-term diplomatic resolution. Trump threatened to impose an additional 50% tariff on Chinese goods on 9 April if China did not withdraw its retaliatory measure of a 34% tariff on all US goods by 8 April. This would boost the effective 54% tariffs on China on 9 April to 104%. China responded with retaliatory tariffs of 84% on US goods. In response, Trump increased tariffs on Chinese goods to 125% on the same day. However, the White House clarified the next day that the tariff rate had risen to 145%. China, in retaliation, announced an increase in tariffs on all American imports from the previous 84% to 125%, set to take effect on 12 April. The US later announced reciprocal tariffs will exclude consumer electronics from tariffs from most countries, but retained a 20% tariff on electronics from China.

On 10 May 2025, Trump declared a "total reset" in US–China trade relations after tariff talks in Geneva. According to transcripts, witnesses saw both delegations returning after a lunch break to an UN ambassador's villa in Cologny. On 12 May 2025, the United States and China agreed to for a period of 90 days, reduce their tariff rates from 145% to 30% and 125% to 10% respectively by 14 May, while further negotiations take place. Treasury Secretary Scott Bessent stated that the "somewhat stalled" US–China trade talks necessitate direct communication between the leaders of both countries, especially as the US implements technology restrictions on China.

In July 2025, Bloomberg News reported that Trump has softened his hardline tone on China to ensure a summit with General Secretary of the Chinese Communist Party Xi Jinping, aiming to push for a trade agreement between America and China.

In December 2025, the US government announced that it would delay the implementation of new tariffs on imports of certain Chinese chips and semiconductor products until 2027. These tariffs were approved as part of a US trade investigation into China's industrial and subsidy policies. However, Washington cited diplomatic considerations as the reason for the delay, aiming to avoid sudden disruptions to global supply chains and to give companies more time to adjust. China opposed the tariff decision, calling it a destabilizing factor in the global technology market. This issue is viewed as part of the broader trade and technology tensions between the two countries in the 2020s.

Taiwan Arms Tensions

In December 2025, the Trump administration authorized an $11 billion arms sales package to Taiwan despite opposition from China. The arms package included a range of armaments, including "advanced rocket launchers, self-propelled howitzers and a variety of missiles."

In May 2026, following a summit with Chinese President Xi Jinping, Trump described a $14 billion arms package to Taiwan that was on the table as a "very good negotiating chip." A spokesperson for China's Taiwan Affairs Office said, earlier in the month, "We firmly oppose the United States engaging in any form of military ties with China's Taiwan region, and firmly oppose the United States selling weapons to China's Taiwan region."

In July 2026, Trump deployed the Navy-Marine Expeditionary Ship Interdiction System and Marine Air Defence Integrated System in the Luzon Strait and southern Japanese islands as part of the US military's regional war plan to defend Taiwan and deter a future Chinese invasion.

== Economic relations ==
As part of China's foreign-exchange reserves, China has a preference for dollar-denominated assets, including United States treasury securities. In turn, the United States benefits because it lacks the domestic savings to fund its budget deficit. After the 2008 financial crisis, Chinese policymakers and the general public viewed China's holdings of US debt as unwisely overexposing China to volatility. China remains a major holder of United States treasury securities, although the amount has decreased as of at least 2022.

Imports and exports between the United States and China. US census.gov data

Foreign holders of US Treasury securities (2009)

In trade matters, the United States has benefitted from China's demand for United States export products, which grew rapidly from 2000 to at least 2021. As of 2021, China was the third largest market for United States export merchandise. Inexpensive Chinese exports to the United States increase the purchasing power of American consumers and American business profits. Both countries are benefitted by the demand for their respective exports to the other.

In 1991, China only accounted for 1% of total imports to the United States. For many years, China was the most important country which required an annual waiver to maintain free trade status. The waiver for the PRC had been in effect since 1980. Every year between 1989 and 1999, legislation was introduced in Congress to disapprove the president's waiver. The legislation had sought to tie free trade with China to meeting certain human rights conditions that go beyond freedom of emigration. All such attempted legislation failed to pass. The requirement of an annual waiver was inconsistent with the rules of the World Trade Organization (WTO), and for the PRC to join the WTO, congressional action was needed to grant permanent normal trade relations (PNTR) to China. This was accomplished in 2000 (United States–China Relations Act of 2000), allowing China to join WTO in 2001. China's most favoured nation (MFN) status was made permanent on 27 December 2001.

Since the entry of China into the WTO in December 2001, the decline in US manufacturing jobs has accelerated (the China shock). The Economic Policy Institute estimated that the trade deficit with China cost about 2.7 million jobs between 2001 and 2011, including manufacturing and other industries. At the same time, China's WTO accession significantly accelerated its economic growth, export expansion, and integration into global markets. Increased access to foreign investment and international trade contributed to rapid industrialization, rising incomes, and China's emergence as a major global manufacturing and trading power.

The PRC and the US resumed trade relations in 1972 and 1973. Direct investment by the US in mainland China covers a wide range of manufacturing sectors, several large hotel projects, restaurant chains, and petrochemicals. US companies have entered agreements establishing more than 20,000 equity joint ventures, contractual joint ventures, and wholly foreign-owned enterprises in mainland China. More than 100 US-based multinationals have projects in mainland China, some with multiple investments. Cumulative US investment in mainland China is valued at $48 billion. The US trade deficit with mainland China exceeded $350 billion in 2006 and was the United States' largest bilateral trade deficit. Some of the factors that influence the US trade deficit with mainland China include:

- a shift of low-end assembly industries from newly industrialized countries in East Asia and the Asia-Pacific to mainland China. Mainland China has increasingly become the last link in a long chain of value-added production. Because US trade data attributes the full value of a product to the final assembler, mainland Chinese value added is overcounted. Using a statistical model that eliminates these global value chain-related distortions, Organization for Economic Cooperation and Development (OECD) and WTO researchers have concluded that the United States' measures may overstate the value of Chinese exports by as much as 35%. According to Pascal Lamy: "The statistical bias created by attributing commercial value to the last country of origin perverts the true economic dimension of the bilateral trade imbalances. This affects the political debate, and leads to misguided perceptions. Take the bilateral deficit between China and the US. A series of estimates based on true domestic content can cut the overall deficit – which was $252bn in November 2010 – by half, if not more."
- US demand for labor-intensive goods exceeds domestic output: the PRC has restrictive trade practices in mainland China, which include a wide array of barriers to foreign goods and services, often aimed at protecting state-owned enterprises. These practices include high tariffs, lack of transparency, requiring firms to obtain special permission to import goods, inconsistent application of laws and regulations, and leveraging technology from foreign firms in return for market access. Mainland China's accession to the WTO is meant to help address these barriers.
- the undervaluation of the Renminbi relative to the United States dollar.

The US and China established the Strategic Economic Dialogue in 2006 to discuss bilateral economic issues. In 2009, the two countries launched the broader US–China Strategic and Economic Dialogue, which added a strategic track to the economic discussions.

United States trade deficit

In September 2009 a trade dispute emerged between the United States and China, which came after the US imposed tariffs of 35 percent on Chinese tire imports. The Chinese commerce minister accused the United States of a "grave act of trade protectionism", while an USTR spokesperson said the tariff "was taken precisely in accordance with the law and our international trade agreements". Additional issues were raised by both sides in subsequent months.

WTO members commit to maximum, or bound, tariff rates, but the rates they apply can be lower. A WTO publication issued in 2015 reported an average bound rate of 39% and an average applied rate of 9% across its members; these figures were averages, not the tariff limits for individual products or countries.

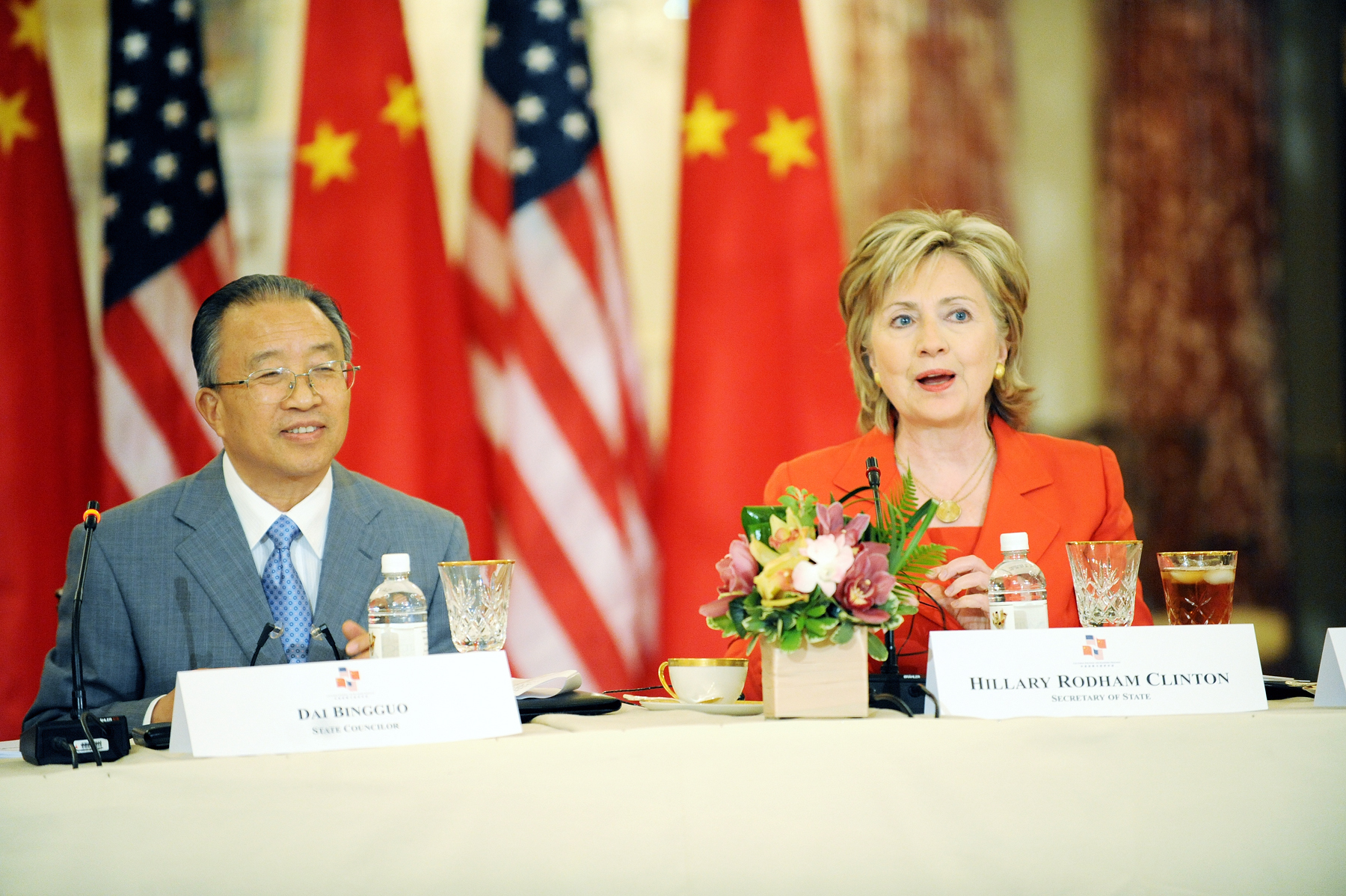
The first round of the US–China Strategic and Economic Dialogue was held in Washington, D.C., from 27 to 28 July 2009

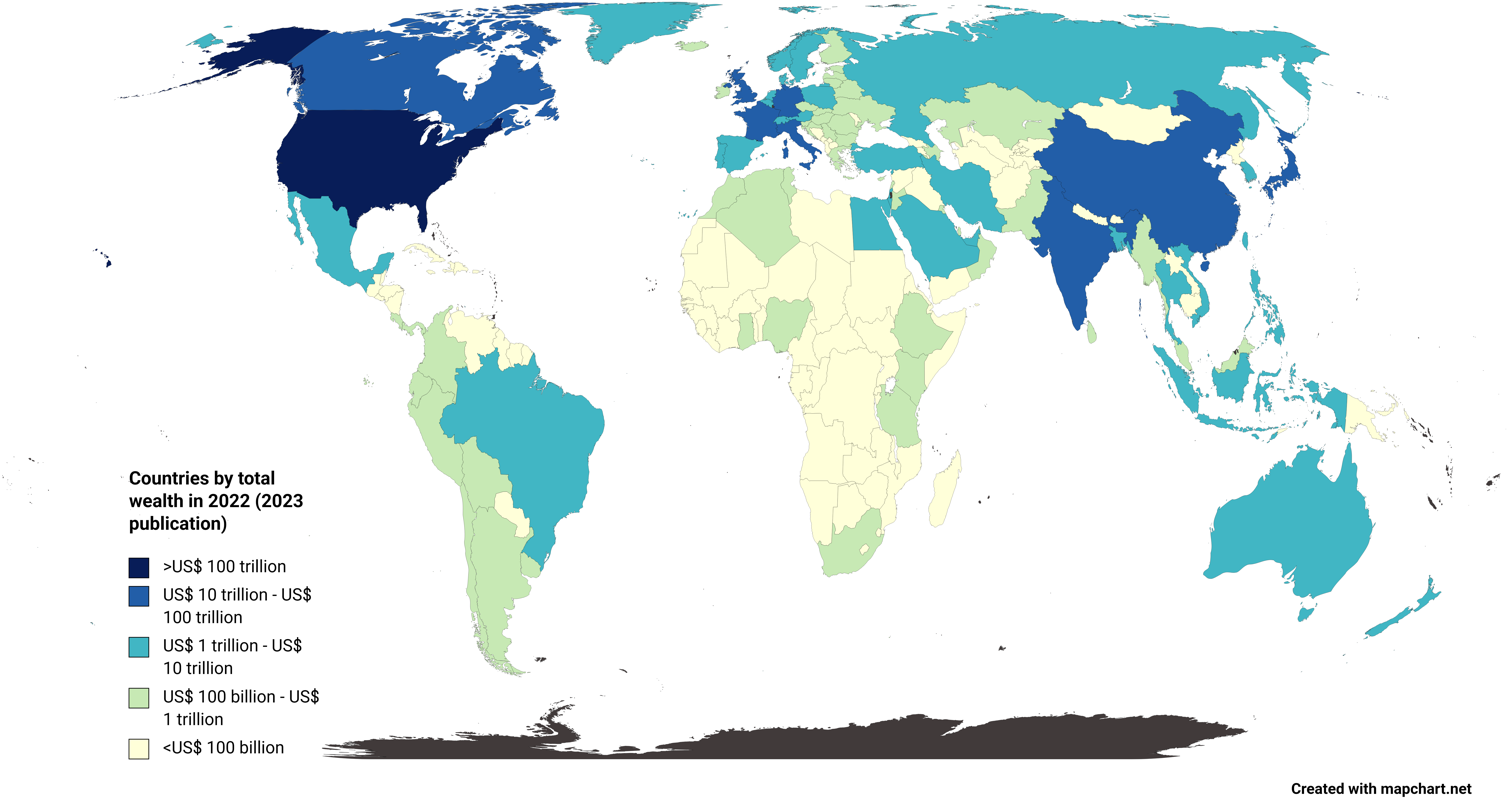
Countries by total wealth (trillions USD), Credit Suisse

In early 2012, a dispute over rare earth minerals was brought into the light between the two countries. President Obama made an announcement that the United States would be one of a few countries to file a trade dispute with China. Amongst the United States, Japan and other Western European countries would also be filing disputes as well. This is simply just one of few disputes between the United States and China. It is believed by many experts, including Chris Isidore, a writer for CNN Money, that "any one of the disputes could damage the economies of both countries as well as the relationship between them". The dispute was filed, and China was charged with putting unfair restrictions on the exportation of rare earth minerals. These minerals were crucial and in high demand by all countries. President Obama believed the United States should have those minerals in the United States whereas China disagreed. China denied all of the said charges brought forth "saying its rules are defensible on grounds of environmental and economic sustainability, and suggests there would be consequences if the United States presses the case." It is important to understand the relationship between the United States and China, especially economically. There is not one without the other. China's state news agency commented that "past experiences have shown that policymakers in Washington should treat such issues with more prudence, because maintaining sound Sino-American trade relations is in the fundamental interests of both sides"

China was the biggest trading partner of the United States until 2019, when it dropped to the third place because of the ongoing trade war.

In November 2021, US producer Venture Global LNG signed a twenty-year contract with China's state-owned Sinopec to supply liquefied natural gas (LNG). At the time, the agreement was expected to more than double China's imports of US natural gas. US exports of liquefied natural gas to China and other Continental Asian countries surged in 2021, with Continental Asian buyers willing to pay higher prices than European importers.

On 25 March 2023, Apple CEO Tim Cook made an official visit to Beijing to attend the China Development Forum. Cook praised China's innovation, and long history of cooperation with Apple Inc. During the COVID-19 pandemic, Apple supplier Foxconn was heavily disrupted by workers protesting China's zero-COVID policies. Cook also presented an expanded rural education program for 100 million yuan to further improve the skill-set of Chinese workers.

Between 2020 and 2023, 70% of all rare earth compounds and metals imported into the United States came from China. China produces 90% of the world's rare-earth elements. In this context, in July 2025, Raja Krishnamoorthi, the top Democrat on the US House Select Committee on the Chinese Communist Party, stated that China could "so much as flick a switch and cause major damage" to the American economy. The committee expressed concerns about the United States' economic dependence on China, particularly in relation to critical mineral exports such as rare earths used in modern technology.

On 13 September 2024, the Biden administration finalized the increases of tariffs on Chinese exports. Tariffs increased to 100% on electric vehicles, 50% on solar cells and 25% on electric vehicle batteries, critical minerals, steel, and aluminum.

In February 2025, Donald Trump signed an executive order that directed the Committee on Foreign Investment in the United States (CFIUS) to restrict Chinese investment in strategic economic areas. Premier Li Qiang emphasized the need for open markets and fair competition, while the US accused China of unfair trade practices and inadequate fentanyl control efforts.

According to Bloomberg Opinion, the United States is still dependent on China for essential inputs used in pharmaceutical manufacturing, including key starting materials (KSMs) and active pharmaceutical ingredients (APIs). Decades of industry consolidation have left many countries, including the United States and India, dependent on Chinese chemical components. Estimates cited in the analysis suggest that China is the sole supplier of at least one ingredient used in roughly 700 essential medicines, and even India's generic drug industry relies extensively on Chinese materials. The US–China Economic and Security Review Commission has warned that this dependence represents a strategic vulnerability for the United States.

China declined President Trump's request to help reopen the Strait of Hormuz amid the ongoing US- Iran conflict, highlighting its reluctant to assist in a crisis largely of the US's making. The delay of Trump's trip to Beijing is seen as a result of mounting tensions, with China signalling readiness to reschedule the visit. Beijing also engaged in deplomatically with Middle Eastern nations, emphasizing its role in easing regional tensions.

On 24 March 2026, after Panama's Supreme Court canceled contracts letting a Hong Kong company run two major ports, China detained nearly 70 Panamanian-flagged ships. The US and several Latin American countries criticized this as economic retaliation, showing how China can use trade to pressure other nations.

On 24 April 2026, the US sanctioned the Chinese refinery Hengli Petrochemical for buying Iranian oil linked to the Revolutionary Guards and criticized China for continuing such purchases, warning they funded terrorism.

On 25 April 2026, Bloomberg News reported that China planned to restrict US investment in certain technology companies, including AI startups and major firms like ByteDance, without prior government approval. The measures, directed by regulators such as the National Development and Reform Commission, aim to prevent foreign stakes in sensitive technologies linked to national security. The move follows increased scrutiny of foreign investment in Chinese tech, including transactions by US firms, and comes amid broader controls over technology and capital flows.

In September 2026, US president Donald Trump and Chinese leader Xi Jinping held a three-day summit in Washington. The two governments agreed to extend their existing trade truce, reduce tariffs on selected goods and establish a bilateral dialogue on artificial intelligence. The talks also addressed Taiwan, Iran and the security of international waterways.

=== Currency dispute ===
China engaged in currency manipulation from 2003 to 2014. Economist C. Fred Bergsten, writing for the Peterson Institute for International Economics, said that, during this period, "China bought more than $300 billion annually to resist upward movement of its currency by artificially keeping the exchange rate of the dollar strong and the renminbi's exchange rate weak. China's competitive position was thus strengthened by as much as 30 to 40 percent at the peak of the intervention. Currency manipulation explained most of China's large trade surpluses, which reached a staggering 10 percent of its entire GDP in 2007." China's currency manipulation was a point of conflict with the United States. Domestic leaders within the United States pressured the Obama administration to take a hardline stance against China and compel China to raise the value of its currency, and legislation was introduced to the United States Congress calling on the president to impose tariffs on Chinese imports until China properly values its currency. Nonetheless, the United States was not willing to label China as a "currency manipulator" at that time, on the theory that doing so would risk China's cooperation on other issues.

In 2014, China stopped manipulating its currency, as the growth in the Chinese economy slowed and Chinese investors made more investments outside the country, leading to a drop in the yuan's value in relation to the dollar, as well as a decline in China's reserves.

In August 2019, five years after China had stopped manipulating its currency, the US Treasury designated China as a currency manipulator. Some US analysts characterized the belated designation as "embarrassing", "without factual basis", or "a stretch". On 13 January 2020, the United States removed the designation as part of the Phase One efforts to reach a deal on the trade war.

=== 2025 tensions ===
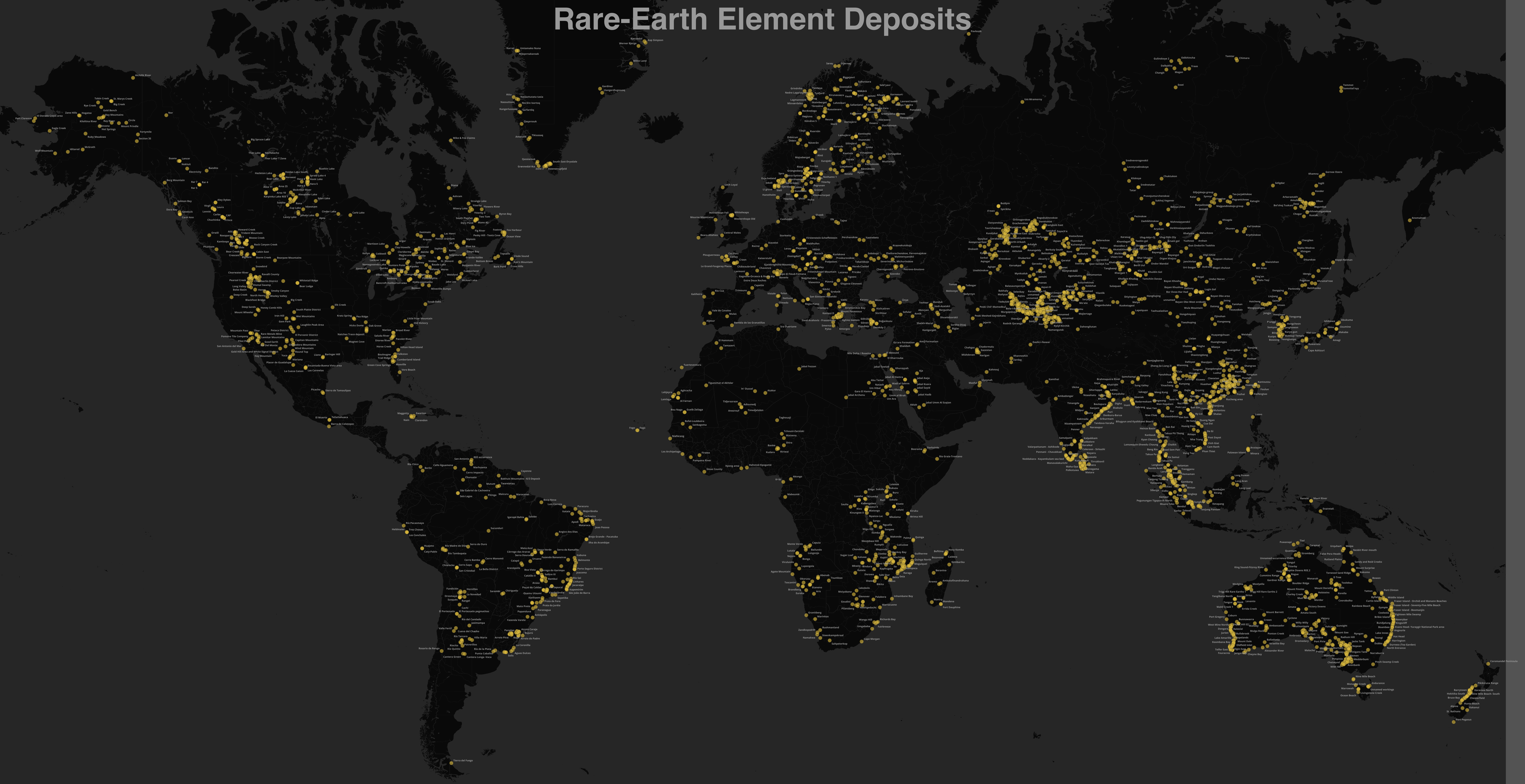
Global rare-earth element deposits

On 10 October 2025, US president Donald Trump announced that a 100% tariff on goods imported from China would take effect on 1 November. This decision was viewed as part of an escalation in trade tensions between the two countries.

On 12 October 2025, China's Ministry of Commerce responded to the Trump administration's new tariffs by calling them "hypocritical" and defending Beijing's decision to restrict exports of rare earth elements. The ministry stated that China's export controls were a response to a series of measures by Washington, including adding Chinese companies to a trade blacklist and imposing port fees on Chinese ships. This incident is the latest example of escalating tensions in economic and trade relations between China and the United States. Trump issued a warning regarding the possibility of canceling a forthcoming meeting with Xi Jinping in South Korea later that month, which was scheduled to take place during the Asia-Pacific Economic Cooperation (APEC) summit. In a telephone conversation that occurred in October 2025 between Vice Premier He Lifeng and US Treasury Secretary Scott Besant, both parties reached an agreement to initiate a new series of trade discussions "at the earliest opportunity."

== Important issues ==
Relations between the two world powers have historically been stable, punctuated by several periods of open conflict, most notably during the Korean War and the Vietnam War. The United States and China have mutual environmental, political, economic, and security interests, such as climate change and the non-proliferation of nuclear weapons, but there remain perennial concerns, such as cross-strait relations and the US's attitude towards the One China policy. China is the second largest foreign creditor of the United States, after Japan. China's expansion in the Indo-Pacific has triggered pushback from the US and its partners in the region. The two countries remain in dispute over territorial issues in the South China Sea; China claims sovereignty over large swaths of the South China Sea; the United States instead sees much of this ocean as international waters, and as such claims the right of its warships and aircraft to conduct military operations within them.

=== Military issues ===
==== China's military expenditure and planning ====
China's investment in its military is growing rapidly; the United States remains convinced that the PRC conceals the real extent of this expansion, a view shared by many independent analysts. China claims it spent a total of $45 billion over the course of 2007, an average of $123 million per day. That same year, the US military spent $548.8 billion, or an average $1.66 billion per day. US estimates of Chinese military expenditure range between $85 billion and $125 billion.

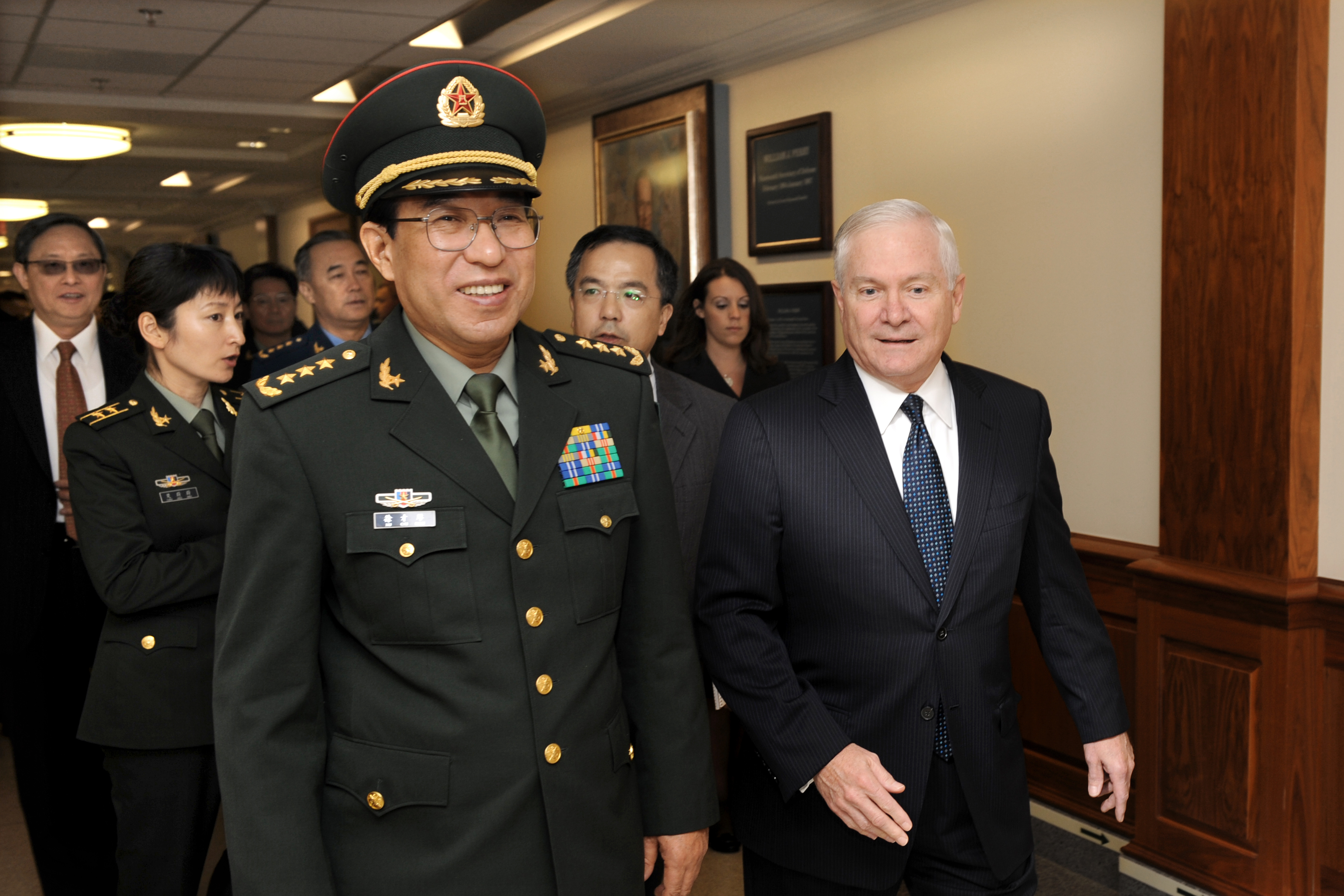
General Xu Caihou of the People's Liberation Army and US Defense Secretary Robert Gates at the Pentagon

Concerns over the Chinese military budget may come from US worries that the PRC is attempting to threaten its neighbors or to challenge the United States. Concerns have been raised that China is developing a large naval base near the South China Sea and has diverted resources from the People's Liberation Army Ground Force to the People's Liberation Army Navy and to air force and missile development.

On 27 October 2009, US Defense Secretary Robert Gates praised the steps China has taken to increase transparency of defense spending. In June 2010, however, he said that the Chinese military was resisting efforts to improve military-to-military relations with the United States. Gates also said that the United States would "assert freedom of navigation" in response to Chinese complaints about US Navy deployments in international waters near China. Admiral Michael Mullen said that the United States sought closer military ties to China but would continue to operate in the western Pacific.

Territorial claims in the South China Sea

James R. Holmes, a specialist on China at the US Naval War College, has said that China's investments towards a potential future conflict are closer to those of the United States than may first appear because the Chinese understate their spending, the internal price structures of the two countries are different, and the Chinese need to concentrate only on projecting military force a short distance from their own shores. The balance may shift to the advantage of the Chinese very quickly if they continue double-digit annual growth, and the US and its allies cut back.

In line with power transition theory, the idea that "wars tend to break out... when the upward trajectory of a rising power comes close to intersecting the downward trajectory of a declining power," some political scientists and international relations scholars have argued that a potential conflict between China, an emerging power, and the United States, the current superpower, is all but inevitable. Many academics disagree with applying power transition theory to the China–US relationship. Robert Art states that these perspectives generally ignore China's peaceful rise strategy. Steve Chan concludes that the China–US power transition will be more similar to the U.K.-US power transition than the Anglo-German power transition in which World War I arose.

In 2026, China expanded land reclamation and military facilities at Antelope Reef in the Paracel Islands, aiming to enhance surveillance, anti-access/area denial capabilities, and consolidate maritime claims. The expansion, occurring amid a reduced US naval presence in the South China Sea, contributed to increasing militarization and prompted neighboring countries, including Vietnam, to strengthen their own holdings in the region.

==== Technological transfers and associated issues ====
On 29 March 2024, the Biden administration revised rules aimed at restricting China's access to US artificial intelligence (AI) chips and chipmaking tools, including those from Nvidia, as part of efforts to address national security concerns over Beijing's tech advancements potentially aiding its military. In August 2025, Chinese regulators informally directed domestic tech companies to halt or reduce purchases of Nvidia's H20 AI chips after US Commerce Secretary Howard Lutnick made remarks perceived as insulting, stating that the US deliberately sold China only downgraded technology.

A US report claims China supplied Iran with offensive drones, satellite navigation system, and rocket fuel chemicals amid escalating Middle East tensions. The report also revealed China was close to finalizing a deal for anti-ship cruise missile with Iran

In August 2026, it was reported that the US would ask countries involved in its technology partnerships to choose between US and China-led initiatives.

===== China's alleged unauthorized access to US tech =====
China has reportedly gained access to classified US military technology on multiple occasions, according to US media and intelligence sources. In the early 1990s, US officials alleged that China obtained American-made Stinger missiles through Pakistan, which had originally received them for distribution to Afghan Mujahideen during the Soviet–Afghan War. The acquisition was believed to have enabled China to reverse-engineer the technology or develop electronic countermeasures. In 2011, following the US raid that killed Osama bin Laden, China was suspected of examining the wreckage of a stealth-modified Black Hawk helicopter that crashed during the operation. While US forces attempted to destroy the aircraft with explosives, the tail section—featuring an unusually advanced design—remained largely intact, having landed on a wall surrounding the compound. Pakistan reportedly removed the tail and, amid heightened diplomatic tensions, allowed China to study it before returning it to the United States after several weeks. Reports citing US sources suggested that Chinese officials had "probably" examined the remains. Analysts noted the incident highlighted China's close defense ties with Pakistan. Former US counter-terrorism advisor Richard Clarke stated that any US stealth technology shared by Pakistan to China would have been perceived as a "welcome gift" by Beijing. In 2021, a stealth variant of China's Z-20 helicopter, described by observers as a "Black Hawk clone", was revealed in concept form.

A 2020 report by the US Office of Special Investigations detailed how Chinese cyber-espionage targeted US military aircraft between 2008 and 2014. Su Bin, a Chinese national linked to the People's Liberation Army, facilitated hackers in stealing over 630,000 files from Boeing related to the C-17 Globemaster cargo aircraft, as well as data on the F-22 and F-35 fighter jets. Using his industry contacts, Su Bin directed the hackers toward specific individuals, companies, and technologies, translating stolen information and coordinating its delivery to the PLA's General Staff. The stolen data, much of which was unclassified but sensitive, enabled China to potentially reverse-engineer aircraft components and accelerate development, resulting in significant losses valued by US prosecutors.

On 10 July 2026, reports showed that OpenAI and Google had been providing AI services to the Singapore-based subsidiaries of Alibaba, Baidu, and Tencent. Even though the parent companies are on a U.S. Defense Department blacklist over alleged military links, they were still able to access advanced AI models through their overseas subsidiaries. The reports said this was possible because of a loophole in U.S. export rules. They also warned that the companies could use these models to improve their own AI technology by studying how they worked and creating similar systems. After the story came out, OpenAI blocked some Alibaba-linked accounts for suspected policy violations. On 22 July 2026, White House science and technology adviser Michael Kratsios accused China's Moonshot AI of using distillation methods to obtain capabilities from Anthropic's AI models while developing its Kimi K3 system.

=== Taiwan issue ===
Since the renewal of US–China relations in early 1979, the Taiwan issue remained a major source of contention. After the announcement of the intention to establish diplomatic relations with mainland China (PRC) on 15 December 1978, the Republic of China (Taiwan) immediately condemned the United States, leading to rampant protests in both Taiwan and in the US. In April 1979, the US Congress passed the Taiwan Relations Act, permitting unofficial relations with Taiwan to flourish and granting the right to provide Taiwan with arms of a defensive character. Its passage prompted Deng to begin to view the United States as an insincere partner willing to abandon its prior commitments to China. The expanding relationship that followed normalization was threatened in 1981 by PRC objections to the level of US arms sales to the Republic of China on Taiwan. Secretary of State Alexander Haig visited China in June 1981 in an effort to resolve Chinese concerns about America's unofficial relations with Taiwan. Vice President Bush visited the PRC in May 1982. Eight months of negotiations produced the US-PRC Joint Communiqué of 17 August 1982. In this third communiqué, the US stated its intention to gradually reduce the level of arms sales to the Republic of China, and the PRC described as a fundamental policy their effort to strive for a peaceful resolution to the Taiwan question.

When Donald Trump won the 2016 presidential election, contention over the Taiwan issue intensified; President Trump became the first sitting US president since Jimmy Carter in 1979 to have any formal political or diplomatic contacts with Taiwan when he decided to receive a phone call from president Tsai Ing-Wen. Trump expanded the duties of the US' de facto embassy in Taipei - the American Institute in Taiwan - by adding more security personnel, and oversaw increasing non-diplomatic visits of Tsai Ing-Wen and Congressmen to each other's countries/regions. In addition, American warships reportedly crossed the Taiwan strait and increased military drills with Taiwan, which mainland China views as a direct threat to its sovereignty. Chinese leader Xi Jinping told European Commission president Ursula von der Leyen in April 2023 that the United States was trying to trick China into attacking Taiwan, but he would not take the bait.

Tensions persist over Taiwan, with China conducting military drills in March 2025 following US statements on Taiwanese sovereignty.

In February 2026, CCP general secretary Xi Jinping warned US president Donald Trump to be "prudent" about supplying arms to Taiwan emphasizing that the subject remained the most important issue between US and China.

In July 2026, US president Donald Trump deployed the Navy-Marine Expeditionary Ship Interdiction System and Marine Air Defence Integrated System in the Luzon Strait and southern Japanese islands as part of the US military's regional war plan to defend Taiwan and deter a future Chinese invasion.

=== Human rights ===
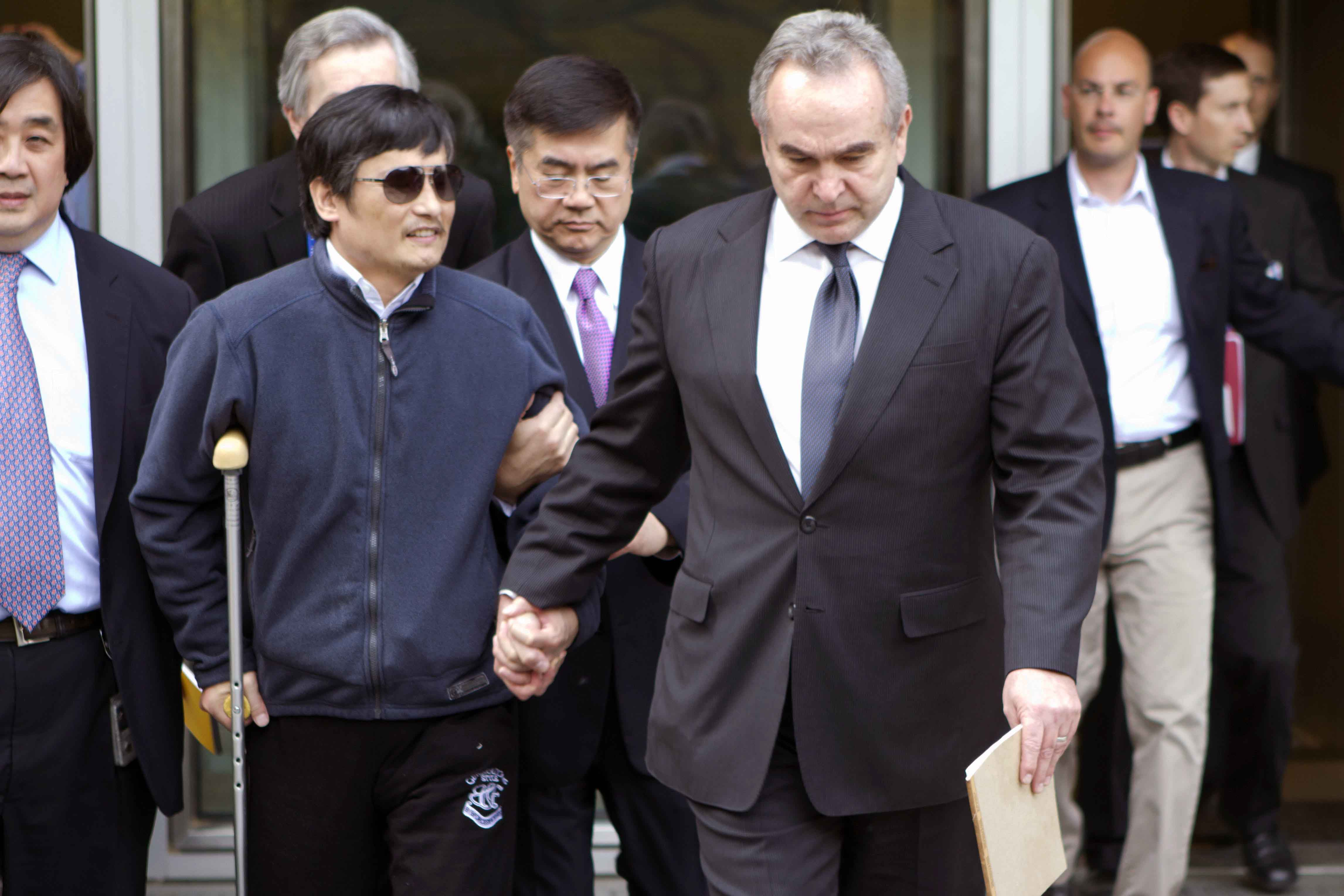
Civil rights activist Chen Guangcheng (left) with former US ambassador to China Gary Locke (center) and former Assistant Secretary of State for East Asian and Pacific Affairs Kurt M. Campbell (right) at the US Embassy in Beijing on 1 May 2012

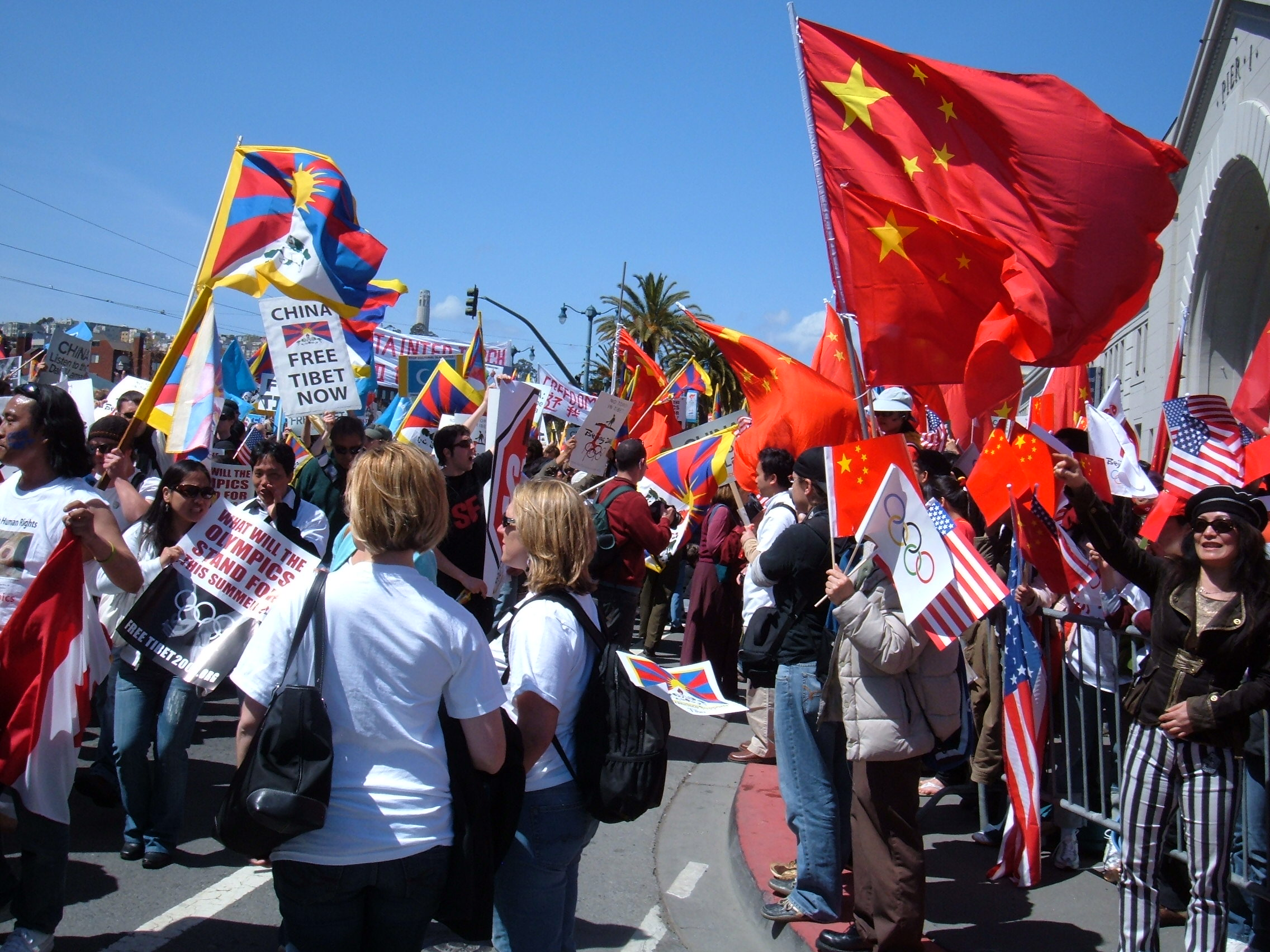
Pro-Tibetan protesters clash with pro-Chinese protesters in San Francisco in 2008.

In 2003, the United States declared that despite some positive momentum that year and despite greater signs which showed that the People's Republic of China was willing to engage in discussions about human rights with the US and other nations, there was still serious backsliding. In principle, China has acknowledged the importance of the protection of human rights and it has claimed that it has taken steps to bring its own human rights practices into conformity with international norms. Among those steps are China's signing of the International Covenant on Economic, Social and Cultural Rights in October 1997, which was ratified in March 2001, and China's signing of the International Covenant on Civil and Political Rights in October 1998, which has not been ratified yet. In 2002, China released a significant number of political and religious prisoners and it also agreed to hold discussions about torture, arbitrary detention, and religion with UN experts. However, international human rights groups assert that there has been virtually no movement with regard to those promises, with more people having been arrested for similar offences since then. Those groups maintain that China still has a long way to go in instituting the kind of fundamental systemic change that will protect the rights and liberties of all its citizens in mainland China. The US State Department publishes an annual report on human rights around the world, which includes an evaluation of China's human rights record.

In a decision that was criticized by human rights groups, the United States State Department did not list China as one of the world's worst human rights violators in its 2007 report of human rights practices in countries and regions outside the United States. However, the assistant secretary of the State Department's Bureau of Democracy, Human Rights, and Labor Jonathan D. Farrar stated that China's overall human rights record in 2007 remained poor.

Since 1998, China has annually published a White Paper detailing the human rights abuses by the United States and since 2005 has also published a White Paper on its own political system and democratic progress.

On 27 February 2014, the United States released its China report on human rights practices for 2013, which, according to its executive summary, described the PRC as an authoritarian state and a place in which repression and coercion were routine. On 28 February 2014, China published a report on human rights in the United States that cited surveillance on its own citizens, mistreatment of inmates, gun violence, and homelessness, despite having a vibrant economy, as important issues.

In July 2019, Vice President Mike Pence accused China of persecuting Christians, Muslims and Buddhists. On 4 October 2019, the Houston Rockets' general manager, Daryl Morey, issued a tweet that supported the 2019–20 Hong Kong protests. Morey's tweet resulted in the Chinese Basketball Association's suspension of its relationship with the Houston Rockets and the issuance of a statement of dissatisfaction from the consulate office of China in Houston. On 6 October, both Morey and the NBA issued separate statements addressing the original tweet. Morey said that he never intended his tweet to cause any offense, and the NBA said the tweet was "regrettable". The statements were criticized by US politicians and third-party observers for the perceived exercise of economic statecraft by the PRC and insufficiency of the NBA's defense of Morey's tweet. Critics also contrasted the league's disparate response to Morey's tweet with its history of political activism The statements also drew criticism from PRC state-run media for their perceived insufficiency, as Morey did not apologize.

Many American companies, including Delta Air Lines, Coach New York, Marriott International, Calvin Klein and Tiffany & Co. have apologized to China after "offending" the country and China's ruling Communist Party.

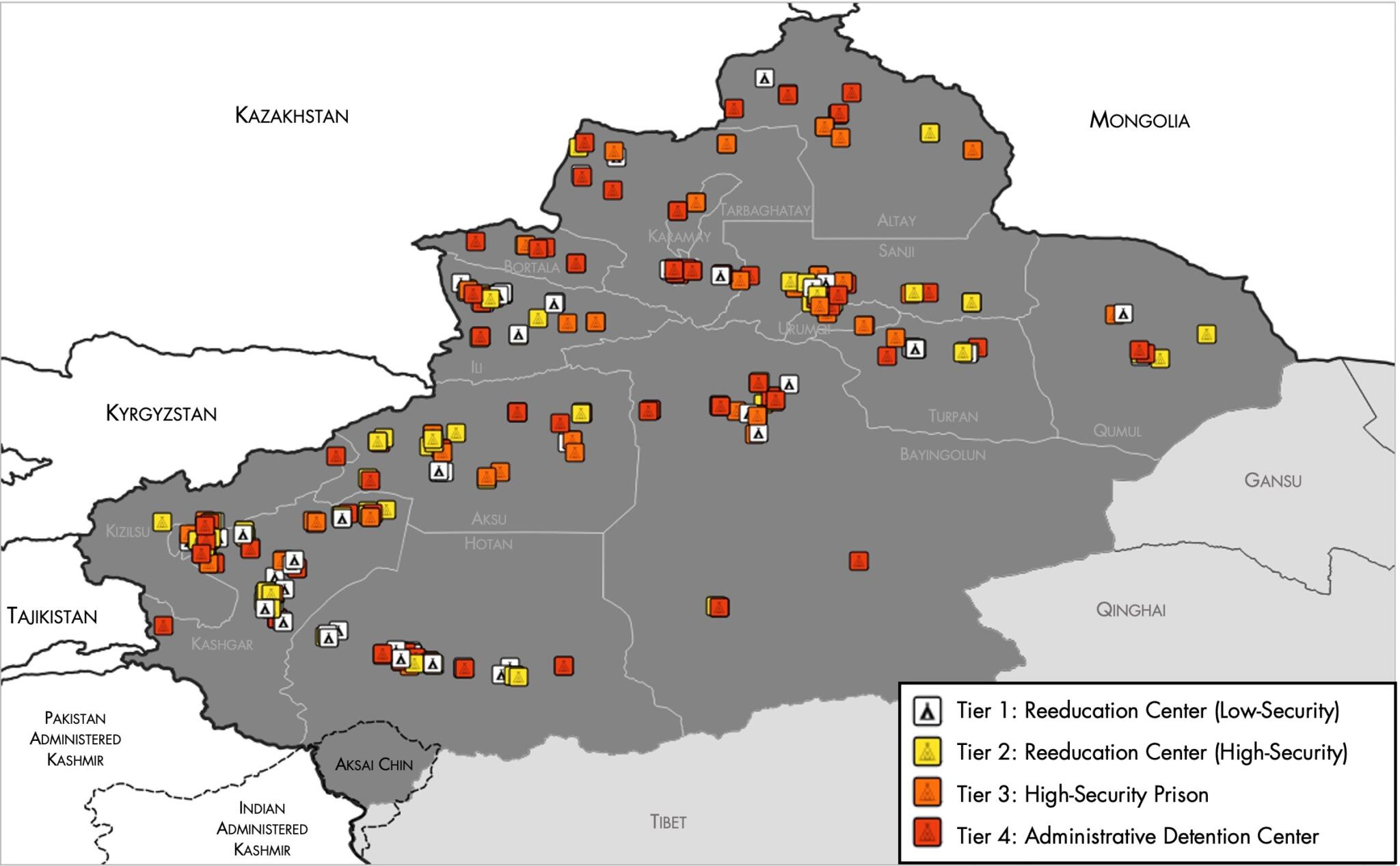
Xinjiang re-education camps. The United States officially recognized the Chinese government's treatment of the Uyghurs in Xinjiang as a genocide.

In 2020, Chinese diplomats increasingly adopted "wolf warrior diplomacy" to deny all accusations of human rights abuses. Chinese foreign ministry spokesperson Zhao Lijian tweeted that as long as the US had problems itself, it "had no right" to criticize China on human rights abuses.

The second administration of Donald Trump has downplayed concerns about human rights in relations between the US and China.

On 8 July 2026, the U.S. State Department said that it supports Tibetans in protecting their culture, language, and religion after a Tibetan man died following a self-immolation protest near the United Nations headquarters on 2 July. It said it would continue urging China to restart talks with the Dalai Lama. The protest emphasized on concerns over China's policies in Tibet. The International Campaign for Tibet says 159 Tibetans have self-immolated since 2009, including 11 living in exile.

On 5 August 2026 China's Ministry of Commerce announced new restrictions on several U.S. organisations, including limits on business with them, stricter checks on drone exports and related technology, and has reduced involvement of U.S. agencies in Chinese factory inspections. This move was a response to recent U.S. trade and technology restrictions . The decision was also connected to U.S. actions over alleged forced labour and human rights issues in Xinjiang, where China has faced international criticism over its treatment of Uyghur and other Muslim minority groups.

According to Bloomberg News in October 2026, "Hong Kong’s political freedoms have largely faded" from the agenda of China–United States relations.

==== Xinjiang ====
American criticism of China on human rights, especially on the issue of the Xinjiang re-education camps, significantly expanded at the end of 2018 and in 2019. In March 2019, US Secretary of State Mike Pompeo indirectly compared China to the Nazi Germany by saying that the roundup of Muslim minorities to into camps had not been seen "since the 1930s". In May 2019, the United States government accused China of putting Uyghurs in "concentration camps". The US government has also considered sanctioning Chinese officials involved in the camps, including Chen Quanguo, the Chinese Communist Party Committee Secretary of Xinjiang and a member of the 19th Politburo of the Chinese Communist Party although no CCP Politburo member has ever been sanctioned by the US government.

On 9 July 2020, the United States announced sanctions against Chinese politicians, who as per its record were responsible for human rights violations against Muslim minorities in Xinjiang. On 20 July 2020, US government sanctioned 11 new Chinese companies from purchasing American technology and products over human rights violations in China targeting Uyghurs in the Xinjiang region. On 15 September 2020, the US government decided to take steps to block some exports from Xinjiang, over the country's alleged human rights abuses directed mostly against Uyghurs of the region.

On 19 January 2021, Mike Pompeo officially declared that China is committing a genocide against Uyghurs in the Xinjiang region. Pompeo called for "all appropriate multilateral and relevant juridical bodies, to join the United States in our effort to promote accountability for those responsible for these atrocities". Salih Hudayar, the prime minister of the East Turkistan Government-in-Exile (who claim to be the legitimate government of Xinjiang), has said, "We hope that this designation will lead to real strong actions to hold China accountable and bring an end to China's genocide."

On 20 January 2021, China imposed sanctions against outgoing US Secretary of State Mike Pompeo, former secretary of health and human services Alex Azar, former under secretary of state Keith J. Krach, outgoing US ambassador to the United Nations Kelly Craft, and 24 other former Trump officials. Biden's National Security Council called the sanctions "unproductive and cynical". In his nomination hearing, Blinken endorsed Pompeo's report that China is committing a genocide against Uyghurs, reaffirming Biden's campaign stance.

On 31 October 2022, the United States, on behalf of 50 countries, delivered a joint statement to the UN General Assembly Third Committee expressing concern over human rights violations against Uyghurs and other Muslim minorities in Xinjiang, citing UN findings of arbitrary and discriminatory detention and urging China to meet its international obligations.

Since 2024, Xinjiang has featured less prominently in relations between the US and China. The second administration of Donald Trump has mentioned the issue of Uyghurs and Xinjiang much less.

=== Competition for regional influence ===
China's economic rise has led to some geo-political friction between the US and China in East Asia as well as to an extent in Southeast Asia and in Central Asia including Afghanistan. For example, in response to China's response to the bombardment of Yeonpyeong by North Korea, "Washington is moving to redefine its relationship with South Korea and Japan, potentially creating an anti-China bloc in Northeast Asia that officials say they don't want but may need." The Chinese government fears a conspiracy by the US to encircle it.

China and the United States have recently led competing efforts to gain Influence in East Asian and the Greater Asian-Pacific trade and development. In 2015, China led the creation of the Asian Infrastructure Investment Bank with the goal of financing projects that would spur the development of the lower-tier Asian economies, thus facilitating improved economic ties across the region. It has been suggested that the United States considered the AIIB to be a challenge to the US-backed Asian Development Bank and the World Bank and saw the Chinese effort as an attempt to set the global economic agenda on terms that would be formulated by the Chinese government. The Obama administration led an effort to enact the Trans-Pacific Partnership Agreement, a multilateral trade pact between a number of Pacific Rim countries, which excluded China. According to the US Trade Representative, the agreement was designed to "promote economic growth; support the creation and retention of jobs; enhance innovation, productivity and competitiveness; raise living standards; reduce poverty in the signatories' countries; and promote transparency, good governance, and enhanced labor and environmental protections." The Partnership was anticipated to impose costs on businesses dependent on regional markets. The deal was placed on hold after the US withdrew from the agreement on 23 January 2017. The efforts are among the attempts by both the US and China to increase their influence over the Asia-Pacific by strengthening their economic ties within the region.

In 2009, the United States requested China to open the Wakhjir Pass on the Sino-Afghan border as an alternative supply route for the US and NATO during their operations in Afghanistan. China refused the request.

ASEAN and the various Southeast Asian states have responded to Chinese claims for sea areas by seeking closer relations with the United States. American Defense Secretary Leon Panetta said that in spite of budget pressures, the United States would expand its influence in the region to counter China's military buildup.

Shared concerns in the face of China have prompted the United States to step up cooperation with China's geopolitical rivals such as India, drawing greater opposition from China.

In the Chinese view, the United States has broken trust in the bilateral relationship through a containment strategy implemented via the Obama administration's pivot to East Asia and the Asia-Pacific, the development of the TPP, and the trade war launched by the Trump administration.

=== Cyberwarfare and election interference ===
The US Department of Justice investigation into fundraising activities uncovered evidence that Chinese agents sought to direct contributions from foreign sources to the Democratic National Committee (DNC) before the 1996 presidential campaign. The Chinese embassy in Washington, D.C., was used to co-ordinate contributions to the DNC.

In 2014, Chinese hackers hacked the computer system of the US Office of Personnel Management, resulting in the theft of approximately 22 million personnel records that were handled by the office. Former FBI Director James Comey stated, "It is a very big deal from a national security perspective and from a counterintelligence perspective. It's a treasure trove of information about everybody who has worked for, tried to work for, or works for the United States government."

In October 2018, the Senate Homeland Security and Governmental Affairs Committee held a hearing on the threat to the US posed by China. Before the hearing, Bloomberg released an article that stated that China is embedding technology in microchips that are sent to America that collect data on American consumers. However, both FBI Director Christopher Wray and Homeland Security Secretary Kirstjen Nielsen declined to confirm that statement. Nielsen said that China has become a major threat to the US and also confirmed, in an answer to a question from a senator, that China is trying to influence US elections.

In 2019, two Chinese nationals were indicted for the Anthem medical data breach. About 80 million company records were hacked, stoking fears that the stolen data could be used for identity theft. In February 2020, the United States government indicted members of China's PLA for hacking into Equifax and plundering sensitive data as part of a massive heist that also included stealing trade secrets. Private records of more than 145 million Americans were compromised in the 2017 Equifax data breach.

According to a report by Reuters, in 2019 the United States CIA began a clandestine campaign on Chinese social media to spread negative narratives about the Xi Jinping administration in an effort to influence Chinese public opinion against the government. The CIA promoted narratives that CCP leaders were hiding money overseas and that the Belt and Road Initiative was corrupt and wasteful. As part of the campaign, the CIA also targeted foreign countries where the United States and China compete for influence.

Voice of America reported in April 2020 that "Internet security researchers say there have already been signs that China-allied hackers have engaged in so-called "spear-phishing" attacks on American political targets" ahead of the 2020 United States elections. As of 7 July 2020, the US government was "looking at" banning Chinese video streaming application, TikTok due to national security concerns. Secretary of State Mike Pompeo said the Trump administration had been aware of the potential threat and has "worked on this issue for a long time". On 19 September 2020, a complaint was filed in Washington by TikTok and its parent company, ByteDance, challenging the recent moves made by the Trump administration to prevent the application from operating in the US. The court documents argued that the US government took the step for political reasons rather than to stop an "unusual and extraordinary threat". In April 2024, the House of Representatives passed a bill requiring TikTok to divest from ByteDance within 9–12 months or face a potential ban, Biden signed the bill into law soon afterwards.

In December 2024, Chinese state-sponsored hackers reportedly breached the US Treasury Department's security systems, exploiting vulnerabilities in the cybersecurity services of third-party provider BeyondTrust. Using a compromised digital key, the attackers accessed a cloud-based service that provided technical support for Treasury end users, enabling them to override security measures and retrieve certain unclassified documents. Treasury officials, alerted to the breach by BeyondTrust on 8 December 2024, collaborated with the FBI and CISA to investigate the incident, which was attributed to a China-linked Advanced Persistent Threat (APT) group.

=== Nuclear security ===
Nuclear security (preventing nuclear material from being used to make illicit weapons) is an established area of US–China cooperation.

Precipitated by a 2010 Nuclear Security Summit convened by the Obama administration, China and the United States launched a number of initiatives to secure potentially dangerous, Chinese-supplied, nuclear material in countries such as Ghana or Nigeria. Through these initiatives, China and the US have converted Chinese-origin Miniature Neutron Source Reactors (MNSRs) from using highly enriched uranium to using low-enriched uranium fuel (which is not directly usable in weapons, thereby making reactors more proliferation resistant).

China and the United States collaborated to build the China Center of Excellence on Nuclear Security, which opened in 2015. The center is a forum for nuclear security exchange, training, and demonstration in the Asia Pacific region.

In May 2023, Chinese Defense Spokesperson Tan Kefei urged the United States to fulfill its commitments and adhere to the Chemical Weapons Convention by taking "concrete actions".

In October 2025, following the US President's announcement to resume nuclear testing, the Chinese Foreign Ministry urged Washington to uphold its commitment to suspending such tests. A Chinese Foreign Ministry spokesman stated that Beijing expects the US to "take practical measures" to help maintain international strategic stability and strengthen the nuclear non-proliferation regime. China also warned that the US withdrawal from the test moratorium could undermine the global norm of a nuclear test ban and escalate strategic tensions between the two countries.

CNN reported, citing sources familiar with the discussions, that the United States and China were considering reciprocal visits to nuclear facilities in the two countries in October 2026. China had first proposed the idea during talks with U.S. officials earlier that year. The proposal included possible visits to U.S. Department of Energy national laboratories and similar facilities in China. Most of the discussions reportedly took place on the sidelines of meetings involving the five permanent members of the United Nations Security Council. Reuters said it could not independently confirm the report, while the White House and the Chinese embassy in Washington did not immediately respond to requests for comment.

=== Opioid epidemic ===
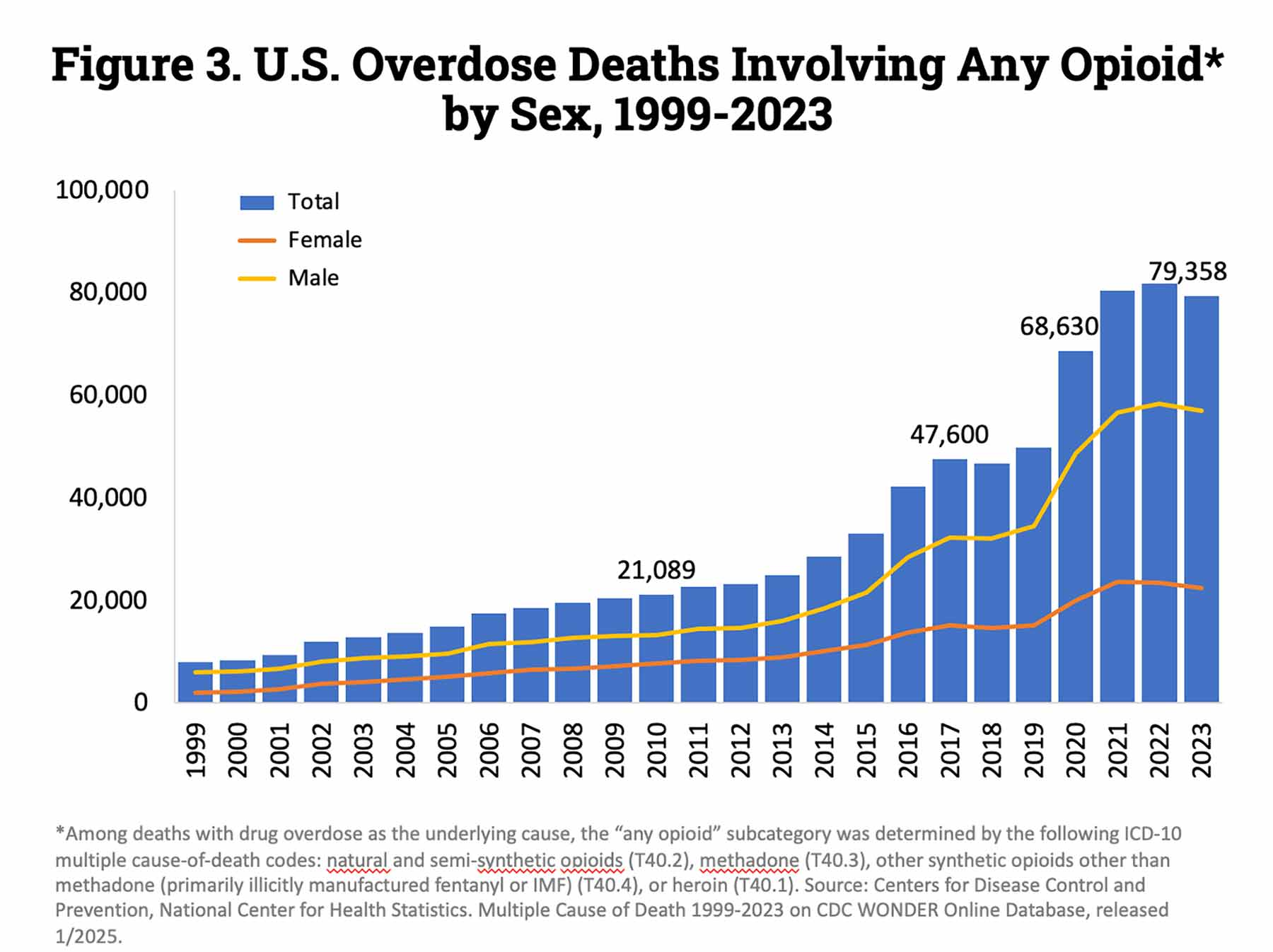
Opioids were involved in 80,411 overdose deaths in 2021, up from around 10,000 in 1999.

According to the United States Drug Enforcement Agency in 2023, China continued to be the primary source of fentanyl being imported into the US, killing over 100 Americans every day. Over a two-year period, close to $800 million worth of fentanyl pills were illegally sold online to the US by Chinese distributors. The drug is usually manufactured in China, then shipped to Mexico, where it is processed and packaged, which is then smuggled into the US by Mexican drug cartels. A large amount is also purchased online and shipped through the US Postal Service. It can also be purchased directly from China, which has become a major manufacturer of various synthetic drugs illegal in the US. According to Assistant US Attorney, Matt Cronin:

It is a fact that the People's Republic of China is the source for the vast majority of synthetic opioids that are flooding the streets of the United States and Western democracies. It is a fact that these synthetic opioids are responsible for the overwhelming increase in overdose deaths in the United States. It is a fact that if the People's Republic of China wanted to shut down the synthetic opioids industry, they could do so in a day.

In June 2023, US federal prosecutors announced criminal indictments of fentanyl precursor producers in China. In October 2023, OFAC sanctioned a China-based network of fentanyl manufacturers and distributors.

In July 2025, tensions between the US and China escalated as President Donald Trump maintained a 20% tariff on all Chinese imports, citing Beijing's alleged role in sustaining the flow of fentanyl into the US The Chinese government rejected the accusation, stating it had already taken significant measures to address the issue and denounced the tariffs as coercive. Despite broader efforts to de-escalate trade disputes, the fentanyl-related duties remained in place, with China signaling frustration over what it viewed as a lack of recognition for its cooperation.

Despite enforcement challenges in a vast and complex chemical sector, observers argue that China could take stronger measures to curb the export of fentanyl precursors. These include tightening regulations, imposing stricter penalties for violations, and ensuring consistent enforcement by local authorities. David Luckey of the RAND Corporation noted that while scheduling substances is a positive step, preventing Chinese companies from supplying precursor chemicals to criminal organizations—particularly in Mexico—would be more effective. He emphasized that as a command economy, China has the capacity to exercise greater control if the Chinese Communist Party chooses to do so.

=== COVID-19 ===
In relation to the impact of the COVID-19 pandemic on politics, the Trump administration referred to the coronavirus as the "Wuhan virus", terms which have been criticized for being racist and "distract[ing] from the Trump administration's failure to contain the disease". In return, some Chinese officials, including Zhao Lijian, rejected an earlier acknowledgement of the coronavirus outbreak starting in Wuhan, in favor of conspiracy theories that the virus originated in the USThe Daily Beast obtained a US government cable outlining a communications strategy with apparent origins in the National Security Council, quoted as "Everything is about China. We're being told to try and get this messaging out in any way possible". Multiple US intelligence agencies have reportedly been pressured by the Trump administration to find intelligence supporting conspiracy theories regarding the origins of the virus in China.

According to a New York Times report in April 2020, the US intelligence community says China intentionally under-reported its number of coronavirus cases. Some outlets such as Politico and Foreign Policy have said China's efforts to send aid to virus-stricken countries is part of a propaganda push for global influence. EU foreign policy chief Josep Borrell warned there is "a geo-political component including a struggle for influence through spinning and the 'politics of generosity'". Borrell also said "China is aggressively pushing the message that, unlike the US, it is a responsible and reliable partner." China has also called for the US to lift its sanctions from Syria, Venezuela and Iran, while reportedly sending aid to the latter two countries. Donations of 100,000 masks to Cuba made by Chinese businessman Jack Ma was blocked by US sanctions on 3 April. Trade in medical supplies between the United States and China has also become politically complicated. Exports of face masks and other medical equipment to China from the United States (and many other countries) spiked in February, according to statistics from Trade Data Monitor, prompting criticism from The Washington Post that the United States government failed to anticipate the domestic needs for that equipment. Similarly, The Wall Street Journal, citing Trade Data Monitor to show that China is the leading source of many key medical supplies, raised concerns that US tariffs on imports from China threaten imports of medical supplies into the US.

By May 2020, the relationship had deteriorated to the lowest point as both sides were recruiting allies to attack the other regarding guilt for the worldwide COVID-19 pandemic. In September 2020, the trade war between China and the US alongside Beijing's behavior during the COVID-19 crisis combined to worsen American public opinion about China. This also affected American perceptions of China-Taiwan tensions as a serious national security concern.

On 22 September 2020, President Donald Trump called on the United Nations to "hold China accountable for their actions", in a speech to the world body's General Assembly. President Trump blamed the Chinese government for the global spread of COVID-19, which had infected 31 million people worldwide and killed more than 965,000, by then.

On 26 May 2021, Joe Biden tasked the US intelligence community with investigating the origins of the pandemic. By August 2021, the intelligence probe assessed that the Chinese government did not have foreknowledge of the outbreak, yet the investigation did not render conclusive results on the origins. Of eight assembled teams, one (the Federal Bureau of Investigation) leaned towards a lab leak theory, four others (and the National Intelligence Council) were inclined to uphold a zoonotic origin, and three were unable to reach a conclusion. In February 2023, the US Department of Energy revised its previous estimate of the origin from "undecided" to "low confidence" in favor of a laboratory leak. Following the Energy Department's revised conclusion, the Chinese foreign ministry called on the US to "stop defaming China" with the lab leak theory, adding that the US was politicizing a scientific issue. In January 2025, after John Ratcliffe became its director, the Central Intelligence Agency revised its previous estimate of the origin from "undecided" to "low confidence" in favor of a laboratory leak.

| Origin theory | US agencies supporting | Confidence level | References |
|---|---|---|---|
| Natural occurrence | 5 (including the NIC) | low: 5 | |
| Lab leak | 3 | low: 2; moderate: 1 | |
| Undecided | 1 | N/A | |

According to a report by Reuters, the US ran a propaganda campaign to spread disinformation about the Sinovac Chinese COVID-19 vaccine, including using fake social media accounts to spread the disinformation that the Sinovac vaccine contained pork-derived ingredients and was therefore haram under Islamic law. The campaign was described as "payback" for COVID-19 disinformation by China directed against the US The campaign primarily targeted people in the Philippines and used a social media hashtag for "China is the virus" in Tagalog. The campaign ran from the spring of 2020 to mid-2021.

=== Clean energy and climate change ===
The United States and China are the highest greenhouse gas emitters among developed countries and developing countries, respectively. Clean energy and climate cooperation were generally viewed by both China and the US as a relative safe harbor for cooperation, even during many of the most contentious periods in the bilateral relationship. A record number of bilateral cooperation agreements, including related to climate issues, were signed during the tenure of US President Barack Obama.

However, cooperation on clean energy and climate change issues were also limited by lack of consistent funding and lack of dialogue at high political levels, and ended almost entirely after US President Donald Trump de-prioritized environmental issues during his term. The subsequent Joseph Biden administration ended the US–China Clean Energy Research Center (CERC) established under Obama. CERC had been the most ambitious clean energy cooperation platform between the two countries, and one of the few cooperation mechanisms to have survived the Trump administration.

In the US and China's Sunnylands Summit on 8 June 2013, President Obama and President Xi Jinping worked in accordance for the first time, formulating a landmark agreement to reduce both production and consumption of hydrofluorocarbons (HFCs). This agreement had the unofficial goal of decreasing roughly 90 gigatons of CO_{2} by 2050 and implementation was to be led by the institutions created under the Montreal Protocol, while progress was tracked using the reported emissions that were mandated under the Kyoto Protocol. The Obama administration viewed HFCs as a "serious climate mitigation concern."

On 18 July 2023, US climate envoy John Kerry emphasized the goal of redefining the China–US relationship through climate cooperation. The subsequent day's discussions centered on climate financing, coal consumption, and methane reduction. Kerry's visit signifies the renewed focus on high-level climate diplomacy between the two nations.

=== Iran war ===
During the 2026 Iran war, Donald Trump warned that the United States could impose tariffs of up to 50 percent on countries supplying military weapons to Iran, including China. He stated that he doubted China would engage in such actions, but added that any confirmed transfers would trigger punitive trade measures. Chinese officials denied any involvement in such activities and warned of countermeasures if additional tariffs were imposed.

The United States imposed sanctions on 24–25 April 2026 against a China-based independent oil refinery and approximately 40 shipping companies and vessels for their involvement in purchasing and transporting Iranian crude oil. The measures are part of the US policy of secondary sanctions, aimed at restricting Iran's oil exports by targeting third-country buyers and shipping intermediaries. China criticised the sanctions, describing them as unilateral and inconsistent with principles of free international trade.

In May 2026, amid the ongoing Iran war and its broader economic and geopolitical effects, the United States further expanded its sanctions targeting Chinese entities linked to Iran's energy export and supply networks. The move coincided with heightened tensions between Washington and Beijing and came ahead of President Donald Trump's planned visit to China, contributing to further strain in bilateral relations.

In response, China issued directives instructing domestic firms to disregard US sanctions on Iranian oil purchases and invoked its anti-foreign sanctions law. The measures applied to several independent Chinese refineries previously designated by the United States. Chinese authorities argued that US secondary sanctions constituted extraterritorial enforcement, while the United States maintained that its measures targeted Iran's oil revenues.

== Cultural relations ==
The United States used to have substantial soft power in China. However, with China's rise in the 21st century, American culture has declined in popularity in China.

=== Sports ===
A major element of China's modern sports policy is to surpass other nations, particularly the United States, in Olympic gold medals. In the 2024 Olympics, the two countries tied at 40 gold medals.

=== Education ===
Chinese students constitute about one-quarter of international students in the US, second largest after Indians, contributing significantly to university funding. While many return to China after graduation, science and engineering doctorate holders often remain in the US The number of Chinese students in the US peaked in 2019–2020 at 372,532, and has been declining significantly since.

In May 2025, United States Secretary of State Marco Rubio announced the US government would "aggressively revoke visas for Chinese students, including those with connections to the Chinese Communist Party or studying in critical fields". He also announced the US would increase scrutiny of all future visa applications from China and Hong Kong. In 2025, the number of F-1 student visas issued to Chinese nationals dropped by 46% compared to last year.

== Public perceptions ==
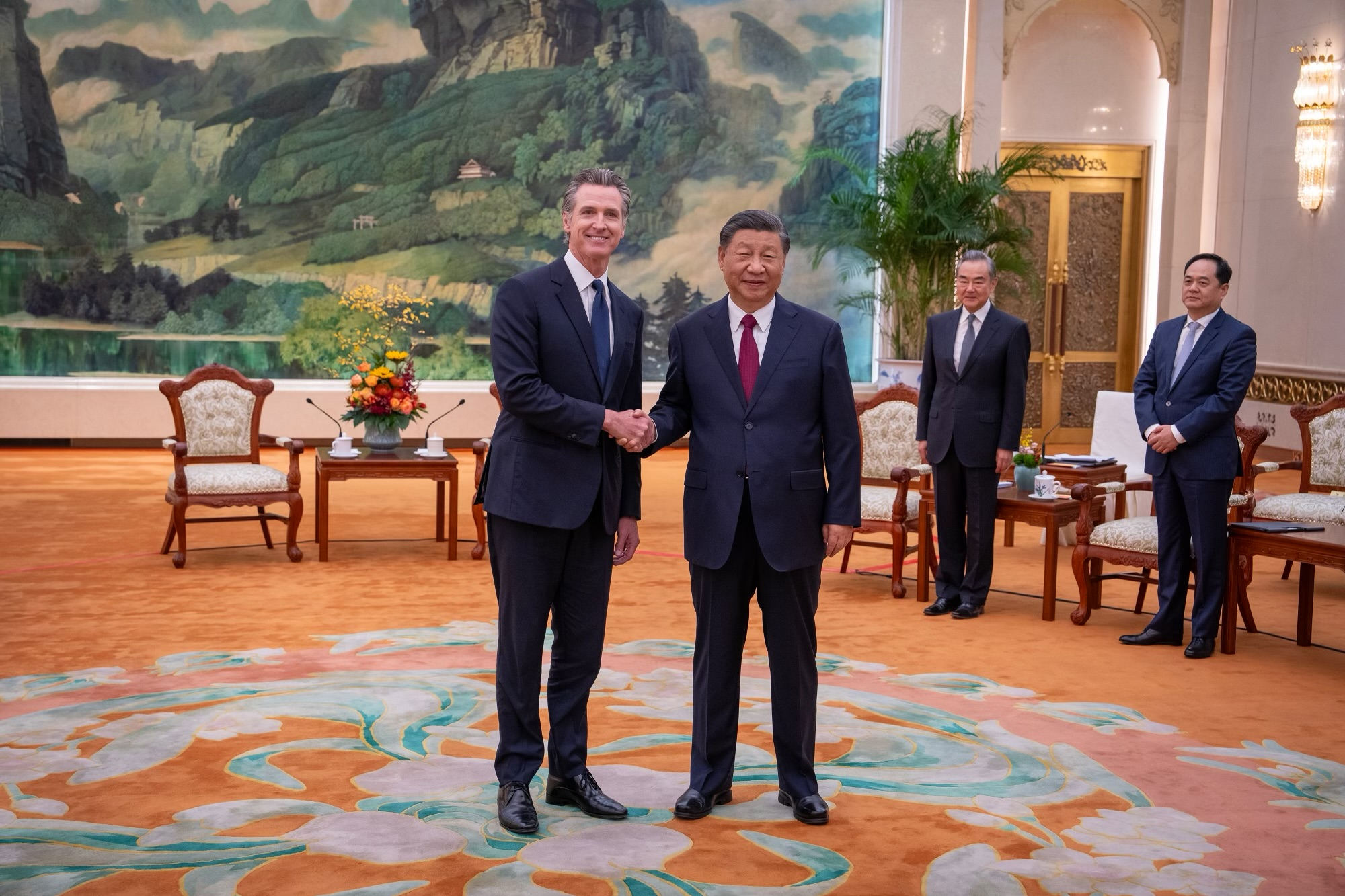
California's governor Gavin Newsom with Chinese leader Xi Jinping on 25 October 2023. Newsom called for better relations between the US and China.

Despite tensions during Barack Obama's presidency, the Chinese population's favorability of the US stood at 51% in Obama's last year of 2016, only to fall during the Trump administration. According to a 2021 poll published in the Journal of Current Chinese Affairs, over 70% of Chinese people had "unfavourable feelings" towards the US. According to a 2023 research, younger Chinese were less likely to express favorable views of the US compared to older respondents, as well as nationalist responders and members of the Chinese Communist Party. According to a 2025 poll by the Chicago Council on Global Affairs and the Carter Center, 17% of Chinese people consider the US to be a friend of China, while 83% do not. According to a 2026 feeling thermometer poll by the Carter Center and Emory University, 73% of Chinese considered the United States to be a national security threat to China.

American public opinion of China and of Chinese leader Xi Jinping has deteriorated sharply since the start of the China–United States trade war and during the COVID-19 pandemic, with many expressing economic, human-rights, and environmental concerns. However, American public opinion towards China has improved since 2025 during the second term of Donald Trump.

In 2023, a Gallup survey showed above 50% Americans are most likely to mention China as the United States' greatest enemy in the world since 2021. In 2024, that percentage dropped to 41 percent, yet China remained the biggest enemy. A 2025 poll by the Chicago Council on Global Affairs found that Americans' perceptions of China improved after several years of decline. The poll found that 53 percent of Americans believe the United States should undertake friendly cooperation and engagement with China, while 44 percent saying that the US should actively work to limit the growth of China's power; the share of Democrats and Independents who believe America should work with China increased significantly. According to a 2026 Gallup poll, 34% of Americans have favorable opinions of China, while 61% have an unfavorable opinion. This marked a significant improvement from 2023, when 84% of Americans saw China negatively; the shift in perceptions was largely due to Democrats and Independents, with 42% and 38% of those groups respectively having positive opinions of China. According to the Pew Research Center in 2026, 71% of US adults view China unfavorably, while 27% view it favorably; this marked an improvement of view from 2024, when 82% saw China unfavorably while 16% saw it favorably. According to a 2026 poll by the Chicago Council on Global Affairs, 57% of Americans prefer "friendly co-operation and engagement" with China, compared to 40% who want to contain Chinese power.

Despite the mutually negative views, the public on both sides overwhelmingly want the relationship to improve. Two-thirds of US respondents in a Harris poll published in 2023 agreed that the US should "engage in dialogue as much as possible to reduce tensions" with China. US public support for engaging in dialogue increased by five percentage points since 2021.

There is a distinct age gap in perceptions of China, with polling showing that younger generations consistently hold significantly warmer views than older demographics. A 2023 poll by The Economist and YouGov found that Americans aged 18–44 are much more likely than older age groups to have a friendly view of China. A 2026 Gallup poll found 55% of Americans aged 18–34 viewed China positively. Similarly, data from a joint Chicago Council-NPR-Ipsos survey, conducted in March 2026, alongside findings from the 2025 Chicago Council Survey, found that younger Americans (Gen Z and millennials) are less likely to view China as an enemy or critical threat, favoring friendly cooperation and diplomatic engagement over restrictive containment policies. Across generations, Americans largely viewed tariffs on China as contributing to a higher cost of living in the United States, with support across age groups for reducing tariffs on Chinese imports in exchange for increased U.S. agricultural exports to China.

== Resident diplomatic missions ==
Chinese Missions in the U.S.

- Washington, D.C. (Embassy)
- Chicago (Consulate General)
- Los Angeles (Consulate General)
- New York City (Consulate General)
- San Francisco (Consulate General)

U.S. Missions in China

- Beijing (Embassy)
- Guangzhou (Consulate General)
- Shanghai (Consulate General)
- Shenyang (Consulate General)
- Wuhan (Consulate General)
  - Hong Kong (Consulate General) (Note: The U.S. Consulate-General in Hong Kong reports directly to the U.S. Department of State, instead of the U.S. embassy in Beijing)

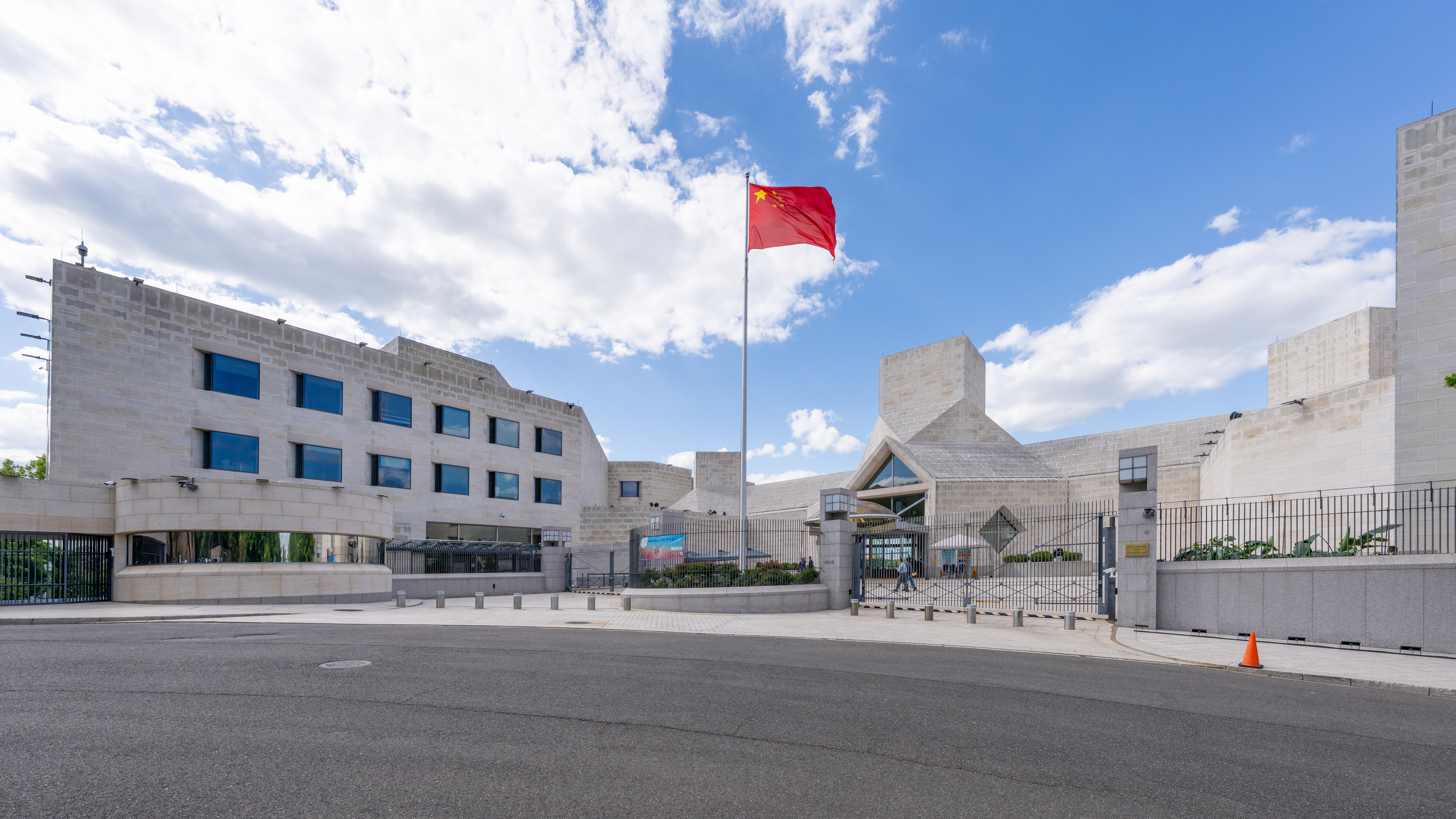
Embassy of China in Washington, D.C.

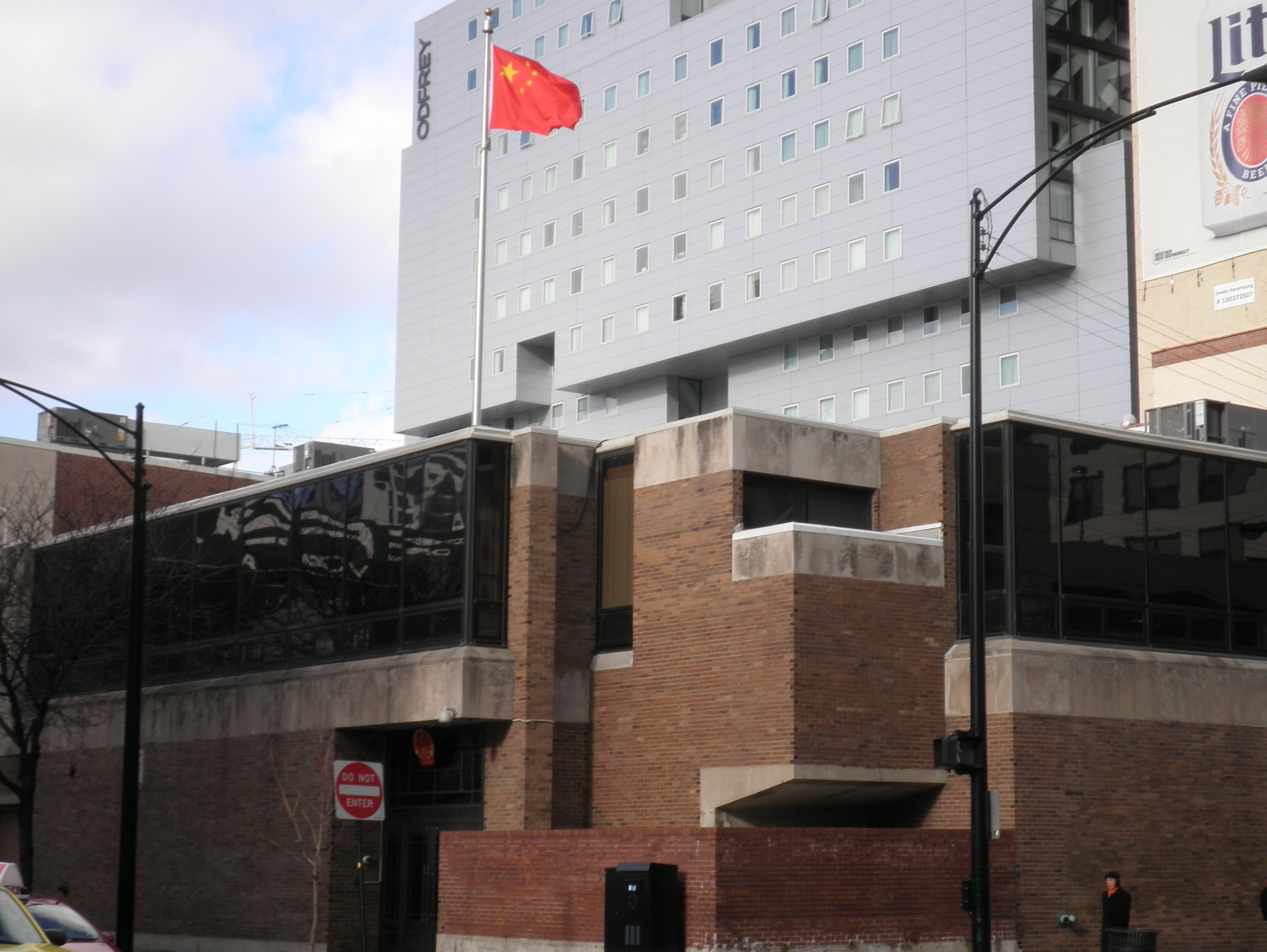
Consulate-General of China in Chicago

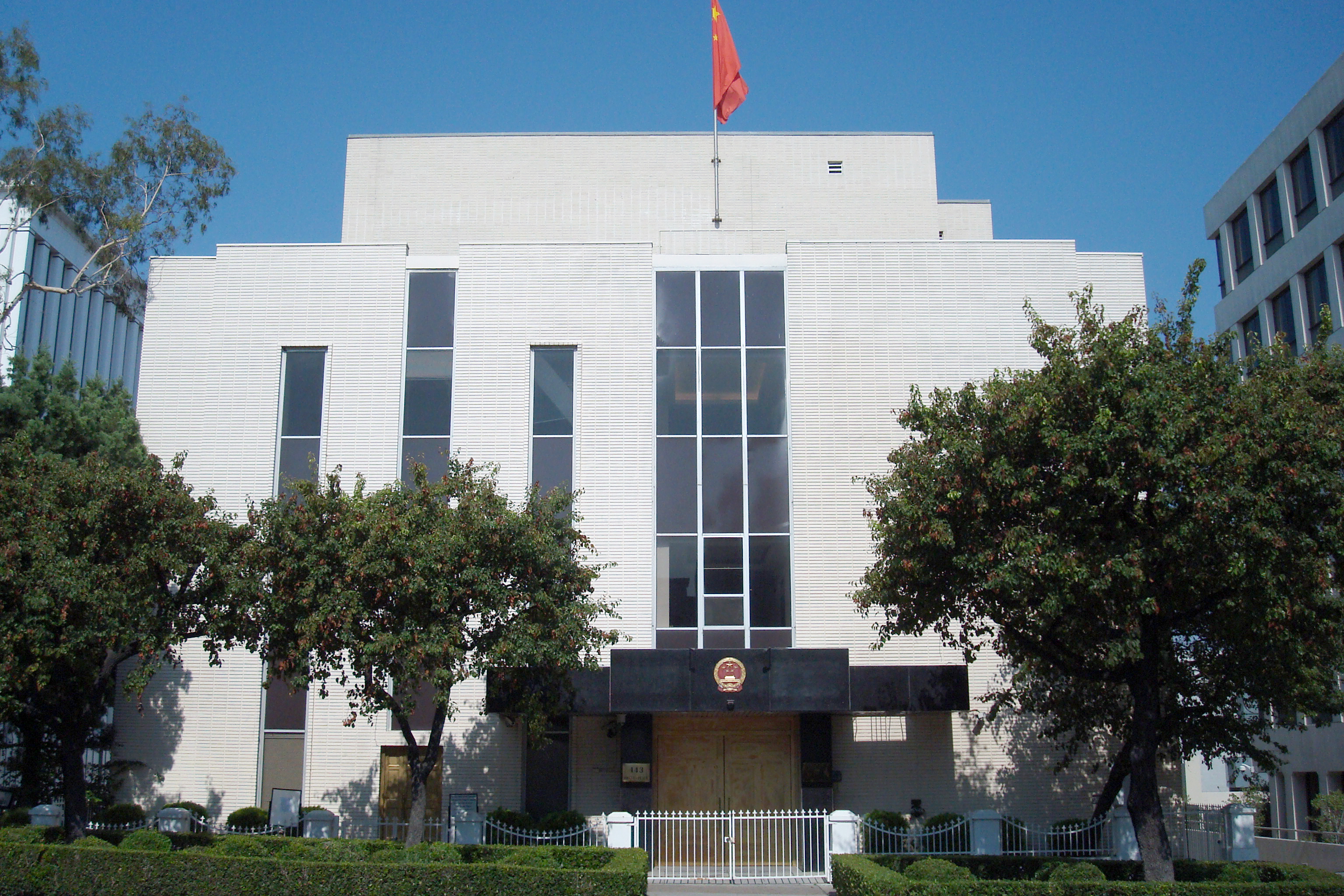
Consulate-General of China in Los Angeles

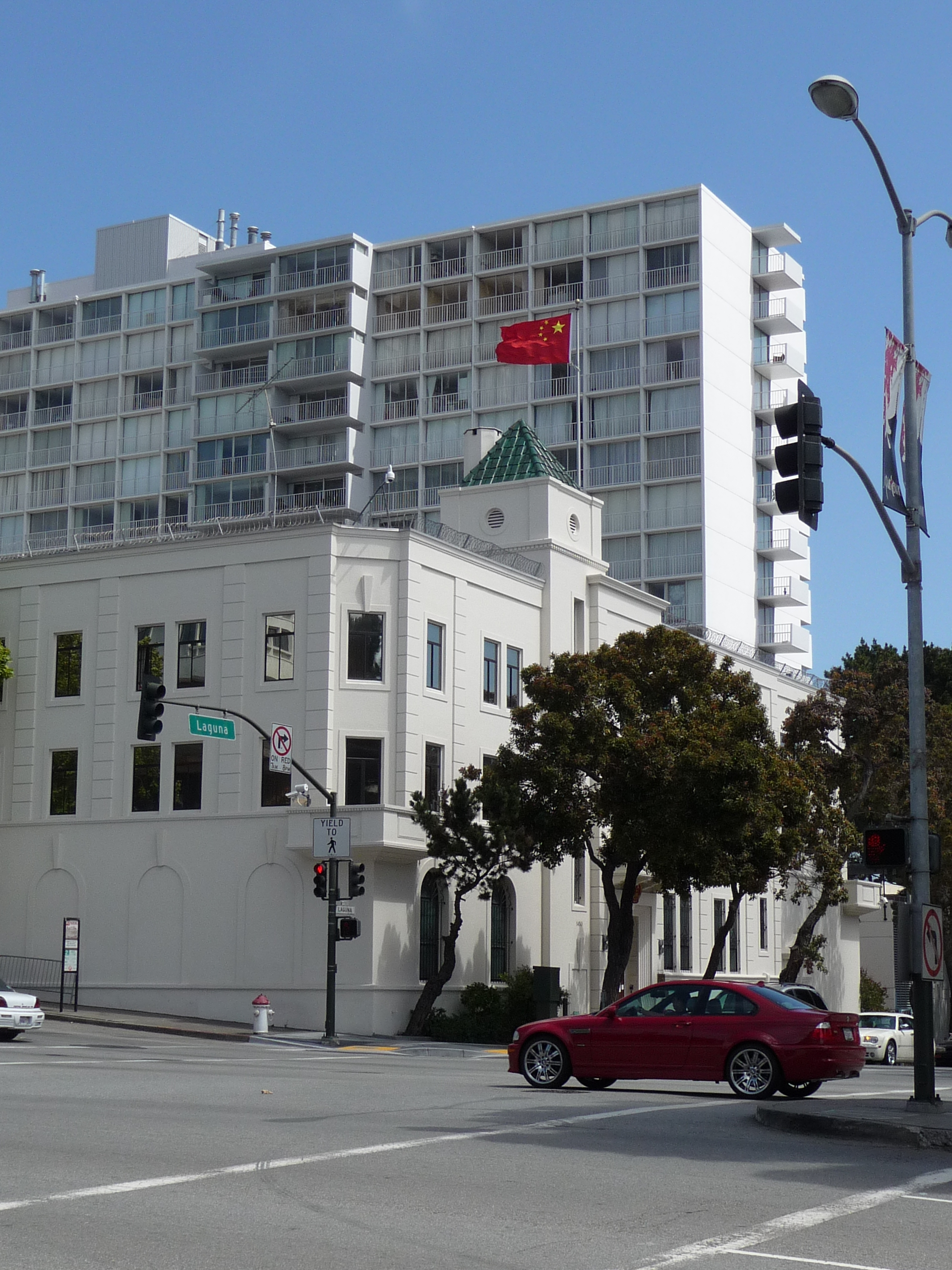
Consulate-General of China in San Francisco
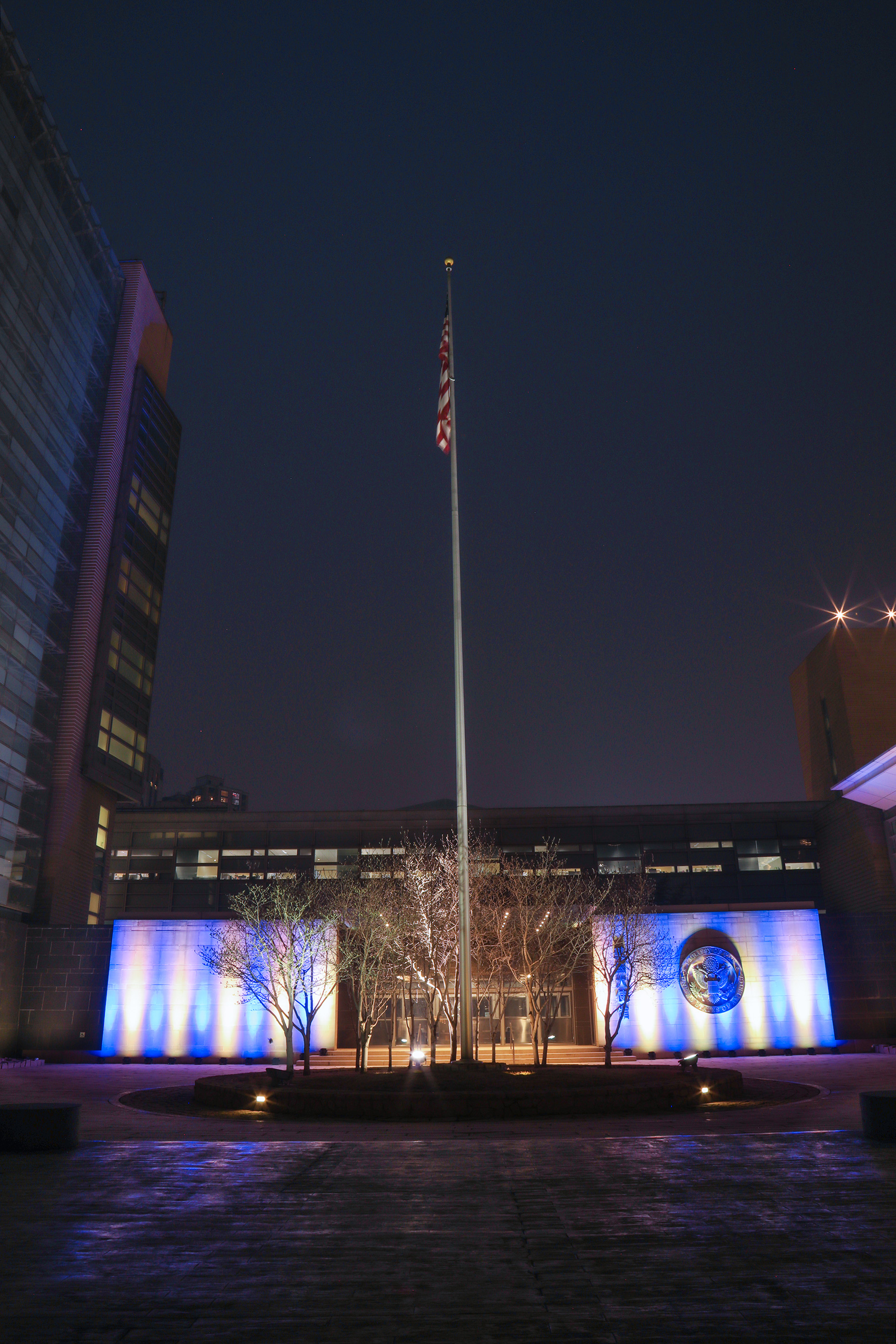
Embassy of the US in Beijing

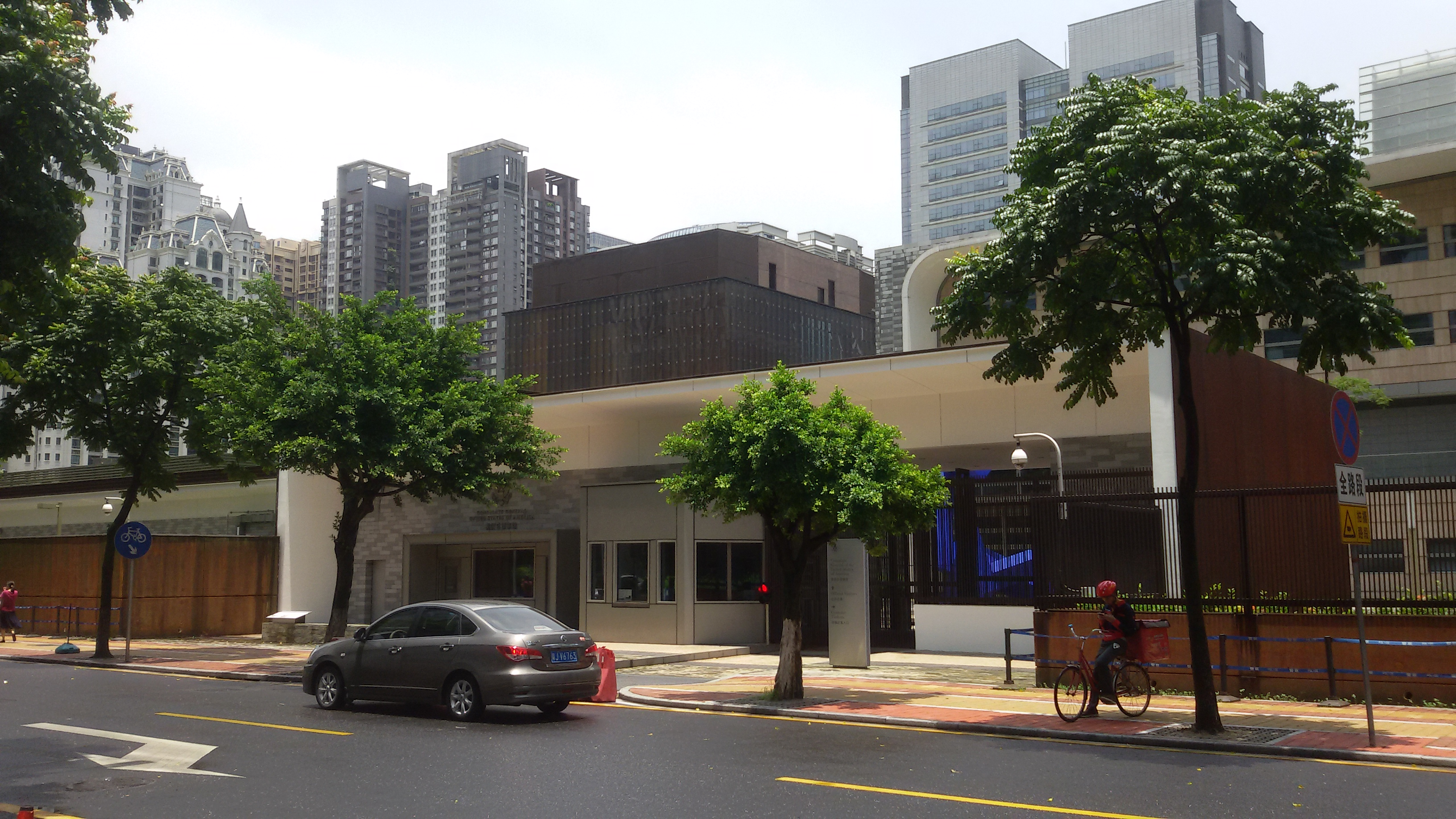
Consulate-General of the US in Guangzhou

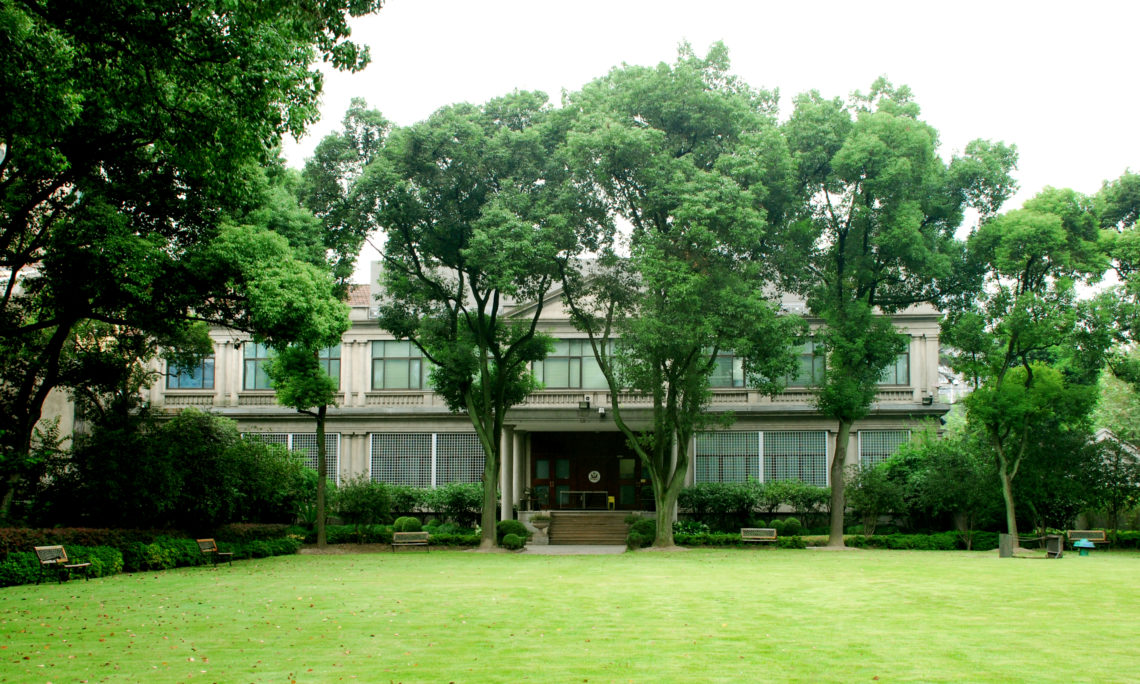
Consulate-General of the US in Shanghai

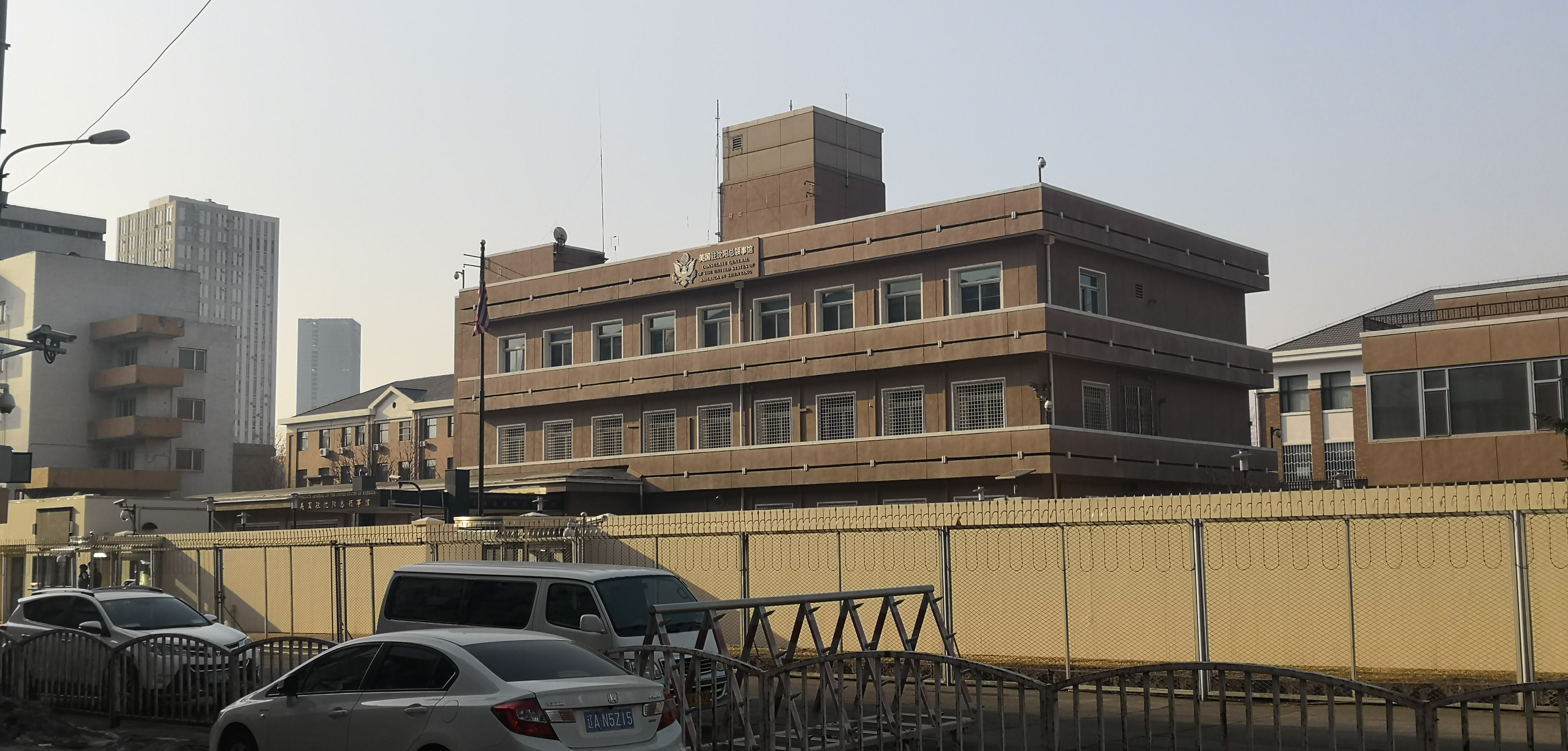
Consulate-General of the US in Shenyang

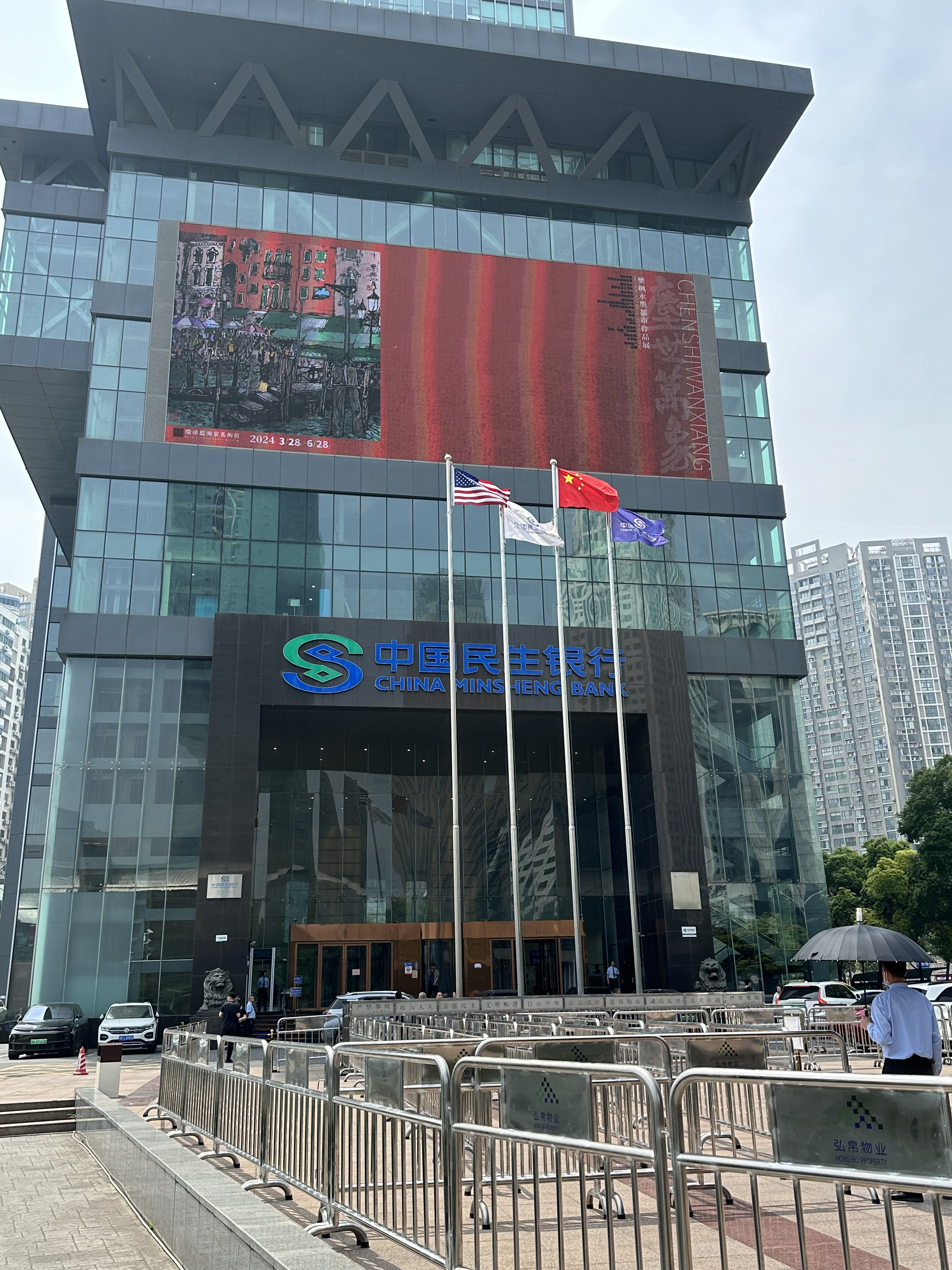
Building hosting the Consulate General of the US in Wuhan

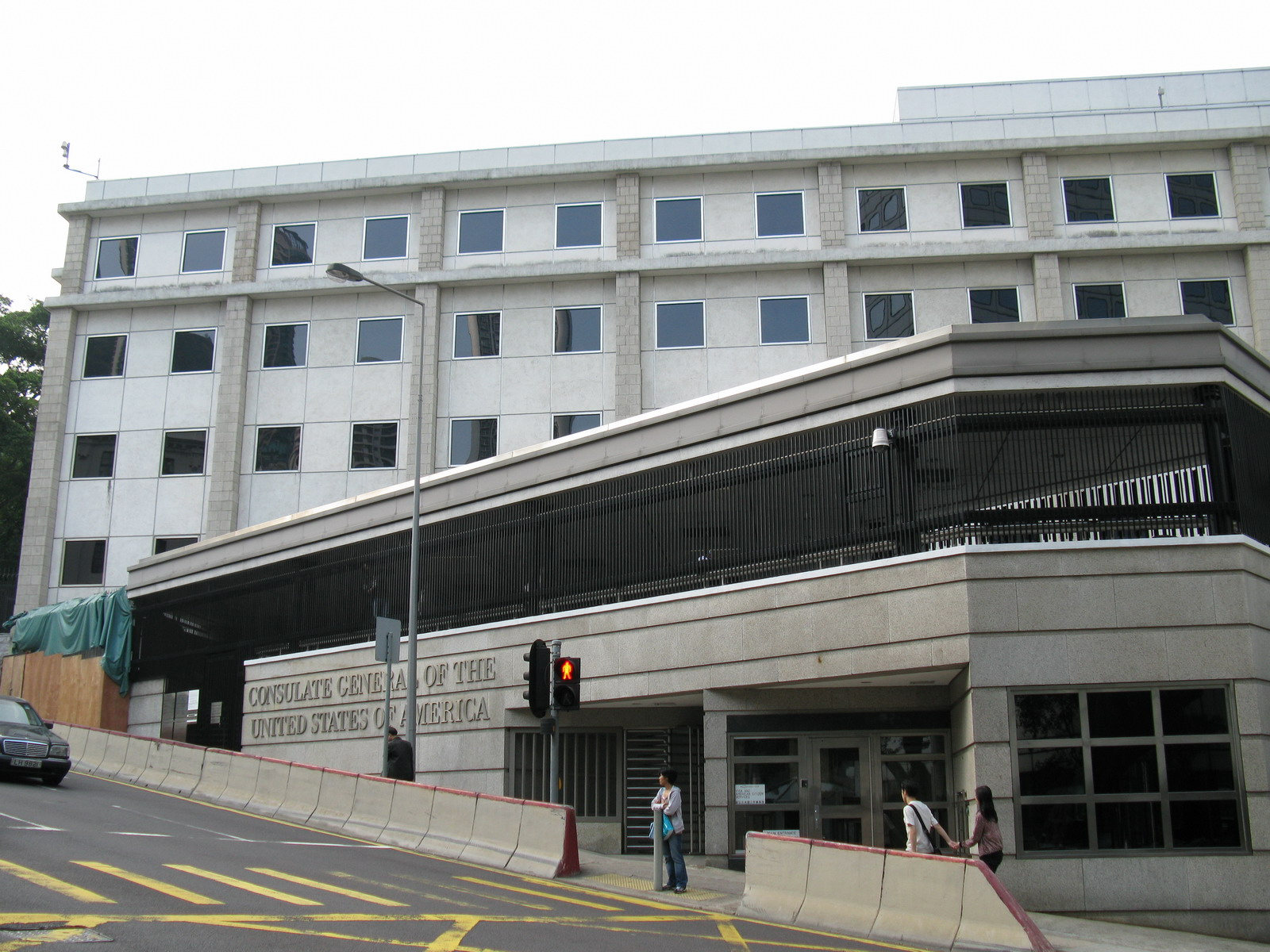
Consulate-General of the US in Hong Kong

== Table of key documents in China-US diplomatic relations ==
| Year | Document / Event | U.S. Administration | Key Historical & Immigration Significance | Primary Source |
|---|---|---|---|---|
| 1868 | Burlingame Treaty (Burlingame-Seward Treaty) | Andrew Johnson | Following the arrival of the first formal Chinese diplomatic delegation, this landmark pact established reciprocal "most-favored-nation" status. Crucially, it legalized and encouraged free Chinese immigration and travel to the U.S. to supply low-cost labor for the construction of the Transcontinental Railroad. | UNL Legal History Archive |
| 1880 | Angell Treaty of 1880 (Treaty Regulating Immigration from China) | Rutherford B. Hayes | Successfully renegotiated the 1868 terms amid rising domestic anti-Chinese sentiment. It granted the United States the legal authority to temporarily "regulate, limit, or suspend" the immigration of Chinese laborers, while stopping short of an absolute prohibition. | Wikisource Text |
| 1882 | Chinese Exclusion Act | Chester A. Arthur | Explicitly suspended the immigration of Chinese laborers for a period of 10 years and prohibited Chinese immigrants from attaining U.S. citizenship, completely upending the free migration principles originally established under Andrew Johnson. | National Archives |
| 1894 | Gresham-Yang Treaty | Grover Cleveland | A bilateral treaty in which the Chinese government formally agreed to a total prohibition of Chinese laborers immigrating to the United States for a 10-year period, effectively legitimizing the unilateral U.S. bans via treaty format. | Complete 1894 Text |
| 1943 | Chinese Exclusion Repeal Act | Franklin D. Roosevelt | Repealed the 1882 Chinese Exclusion Act to honor China as a key World War II ally against the Axis powers. It re-allowed Chinese immigration under a strict national quota system and restored naturalization rights for Chinese residents. | GovTrack Bill Records |
| 1946 | Treaty of Friendship, Commerce and Navigation | Harry S. Truman | A comprehensive commercial treaty signed with the Nationalist (ROC) government to solidify trade, freedom of travel, and bilateral corporate rights just prior to the conclusion of the Chinese Civil War. | Wikisource Text |
| 1972 | Shanghai Communiqué | Richard Nixon | Issued during Nixon's historic visit to Beijing, this breakthrough document initiated the normalization of ties between the U.S. and the People's Republic of China (PRC), ending decades of diplomatic isolation. | State Dept. Archive |
| 1979 | Joint Communiqué on the Establishment of Diplomatic Relations | Jimmy Carter | The official document that formally established full, normalized diplomatic relations between the U.S. and the PRC, officially transferring U.S. recognition from Taipei to Beijing as the sole legitimate government of China. | State Dept. Archive |

== See also ==
=== Geostrategic ===
- American espionage in China
- Blue Team (U.S. politics)
- Chinese espionage in the United States
- China Lobby
- Chinese Century
- China–United States trade war
- United States sanctions against China
- Clash of Civilizations
- Foreign relations of China
- Foreign relations of the United States
- List of Chinese spy cases in the United States of America
- Cox Report
- Group of Two (G2)
- G20
- Peaceful Evolution theory
- Quadrilateral Security Dialogue
- String of Pearls (Indian Ocean)
- Thucydides Trap

=== General ===
- Americans in China
- Anti-American sentiment in mainland China
- Anti-Chinese sentiment in the United States
- Becoming Chinese (Chinamaxxing)
- Beijing–Washington hotline
- Chinese Americans
- Group of Two
- Strategic Economic Dialogue
- Taiwan–United States relations
- U.S.–China Strategic and Economic Dialogue

=== Historic ===
- History of Chinese Americans
- History of the Republic of China
- History of the People's Republic of China
- East Asia–United States relations
- 1996 United States campaign finance controversy
- China Hands, American experts on China
- Hainan Island incident
- Operation Beleaguer
- 1972 visit by Richard Nixon to China
- Ping-pong diplomacy
- United States-China Economic and Security Review Commission
- U.S. immigration policy toward the People's Republic of China
- US Department of Defense China Task Force
- Xenophobia and racism related to the COVID-19 pandemic
