= Li Xiaokun =

Chinese geneticist

- 李校堃
- Incumbent
- Assumed office April 2018
- Preceded by: Fan Lu

President of Wenzhou University
- In office July 2015 – April 2018
- Preceded by: Cai Yuanqiang
- Succeeded by: Xie Min

Personal details
- Born: February 1964 (age 62) Fuping County, Shaanxi, China
- Party: Chinese Communist Party
- Education: Jilin University; Sun Yat-sen University
- Scientific career
- Fields: Gene engineering
- Workplaces: Wenzhou Medical University

Li Xiaokun (Chinese: 李校堃; pinyin: Lǐ Xiàokūn; born February 1964) is a Chinese geneticist currently serving as president of Wenzhou Medical University.

== Biography ==
Li was born in Fuping County, Shaanxi, in February 1964. He enrolled at Jilin University where he received his bachelor's degree in 1987 and his master's degree in 1992 both in medical science. Li received his doctor's degree from Sun Yat-sen University in 1996. After university, he joined the faculty of Jinan University. Li moved to Wenzhou in 2005. In July 2015 he was promoted to president of Wenzhou University, but having held the position for only two years. In April 2018 he was appointed president of Wenzhou Medical University, replacing Fan Lu.

== Honors and awards ==
- November 22, 2019 Member of the Chinese Academy of Engineering (CAE)

Educational offices
Preceded by Cai Yuanqiang (蔡袁强)	President of Wenzhou University; 2015–2018	Succeeded by Xie Min (谢敏)
Preceded by Fan Lu	President of Wenzhou Medical University; 2018	Incumbent
