= First Affiliated Hospital =

First Affiliated Hospital may refer to:

- First Affiliated Hospital of Zhengzhou University, Henan, China
- First Affiliated Hospital of Nankai University, Tianjin, China
- Tianjin University of Traditional Chinese Medicine First Affiliated Hospital, Tianjin, China
- First Affiliated Hospital of Xinjiang Medical University, Xinjiang, China
- The First Affiliated Hospital of Wenzhou Medical University, Zhejiang, China
