= Jia Qu =

Chinese physician and politician

Professor Jia Qu
- 瞿佳
- Born: 1955 (age 70–71); Urumqi, Xinjiang, China
- Occupations: Ophthalmologist, optometrist, academic administrator
- Known for: Advancing ophthalmology and optometry education in China; Wenzhou Model of Optometric Education
- Title: Former President of Wenzhou Medical University
- Board member of: University of Chinese Academy of Sciences Wenzhou Institute
- Awards: Ho Leung Ho Lee Prize (2018); Tan Jiazhen Award in Clinical Medicine (2018)

Academic background
- Education: Wenzhou Medical College (M.Sc.)
- Alma mater: Wenzhou Medical College
- Academic advisor: Miao Tianrong

Academic work
- Discipline: Ophthalmology, Optometry
- Sub-discipline: Optometric education
- Institutions: Wenzhou Medical University
- Main interests: Myopia, genetic eye diseases, ocular tumors, optometry
- Notable ideas: Wenzhou Model of Optometric Education

Jia Qu (Chinese: 瞿佳; born 1955) is a Chinese professor of ophthalmology and optometry. He previously served as the principal of Wenzhou Medical University and a representative member of the 12th National People's Congress.

From 2002 to 2015, Qu served as the president of the Wenzhou Medical University.

== Early life and education ==
Qu was born in 1955 in Urumqi, Xinjiang, China. He completed his clinical medicine program at Wenzhou Medical College from 1978 to 1983. He then pursued a master's degree in ophthalmology at the same institution under the supervision of Professor Miao Tianrong, a pioneer in Chinese ophthalmic optics, completing this degree in 1983.

Qu also holds honorary doctoral degrees from the New England College of Optometry and the State University of New York.

== Career ==
Following his graduation, Qu continued at Wenzhou Medical College as a faculty member and practicing physician. In 1988, Qu established an optometry program at Wenzhou Medical College.

In 1998, Qu founded an optometry hospital in China. Under his leadership, optometry-related higher education programs have been launched in over twenty universities in the country. He introduced the Wenzhou Model of Optometric Education in China, an educational framework that has had an impact on the development of optometry education in China. On September 30, 1998, Qu was appointed as the dean of the Eye Hospital at Wenzhou Medical University.

In 2003, Qu was selected as the director of the National Health Commission Key Laboratory of Vision Science.

In 2013, Qu became the director of the National Eye Optometry Engineering Technology Research Center. A year later, he founded Eye and Vision, where he serves as the editor-in-chief. Previously, he served as the editor-in-chief of the Chinese Journal of Optometry Ophthalmology and Visual Science.

Qu has been the director of the Ministry of Education Engineering Technology Research Center for Myopia Prevention and Treatment since 2018. He has served as the chairman of the Ophthalmology and Optometry Group of the Ophthalmology Branch of the Chinese Medical Association and the Ophthalmology Special Committee of the Chinese Physician Association since 2019. Additionally, he chairs the Board of Directors of the University of Chinese Academy of Sciences Wenzhou Institute.

Qu is a member of the Clinical Medicine Discipline Review Group of the Seventh and Eighth Academic Degrees Committee of the State Council and has held vice chairmanships in the Ophthalmology Branch of the Chinese Medical Association and the Geriatrics Branch of the Chinese Geriatrics Society.

Since 2018, Qu has been the chair of the Teaching Guidance Committee for Ophthalmology and Optometry Medicine in Higher Education under the Ministry of Education.

== Research ==
Qu's research focuses on the pathogenesis of myopia, hereditary eye diseases, and ocular tumors. He has led over multiple research projects, including national initiatives such as the National 973 Program, the National Science and Technology Support Program, the National 863 Program, and programs funded by the National Natural Science Foundation of China.

Qu has authored research papers in SCI-indexed journals. His research has resulted in two second prizes in the National Prize for Progress in Science and Technology, where he was the primary leader of the awarded projects.

== Awards and recognition ==
- Ho Leung Ho Lee Prize (2018)
- Tan Jiazhen Award in Clinical Medicine (2018)
