= Steven J. Fliesler =

American biochemist

Steven J. Fliesler is a distinguished American biochemist and researcher renowned for his contributions to the field of ophthalmology. He currently holds the title of SUNY Distinguished Professor and serves as the Meyer H. Riwchun Endowed Chair Professor of Ophthalmology at the University at Buffalo, The State University of New York (SUNY). Additionally, he also serves as the Vice-Chair for Research in the Department of Ophthalmology and acts as the Director of the Ira G. Ross Eye Institute Vision Research Center at the Buffalo VA Medical Center, VA Western NY Healthcare System (VAWNYHS), in Buffalo, NY.

== Education ==
Fliesler earned his Ph.D. in Biochemistry from Rice University in May 1980 and his B.A. in Biochemistry from the University of California, Berkeley in December 1973. He pursued further professional training through an N.R.S.A. Postdoctoral research fellowship in Retinal Biochemistry at the Cullen Eye Institute, Department of Ophthalmology, Baylor College of Medicine, Houston, TX from 1979 to 1982.

== Professional appointments ==
Fliesler has held several academic and research appointments including:

- Research Assistant Professor, Department of Ophthalmology, Baylor College of Medicine, Houston, Texas (1982-1984).
- Assistant Professor, Departments of Ophthalmology (Bascom Palmer Eye Institute) and Biochemistry, University of Miami School of Medicine, Miami, Florida (1985-1988)
- Associate Professor, Departments of Ophthalmology, Biochemistry and Molecular Biology, and Physiological and Pharmacological Sciences, Saint Louis University School of Medicine, St. Louis, Missouri (1988-2008)
- Meyer H. Riwchun Endowed Chair Professor of Ophthalmology, University at Buffalo, Buffalo, New York (2008-present)
- Professor, Department of Biochemistry and Neuroscience Graduate Program, University at Buffalo, Buffalo, New York (2008-present)
- Research Career Scientist (GS-15), VAWNYHS, Buffalo, New York (2016-present)
- SUNY Distinguished Professor, University at Buffalo, Buffalo, New York (2018-present)
- Editor in Chief, Experimental Eye Research (2018-present)
- Elected member, Society of Eye Journal Editors (SEJE) (2025-present)

== Honors and awards ==
- 2002: Chancellor's Award in Neuroscience Lecturer, LSU School of Medicine.
- 2007: Senior Scientific Investigator Award, Research to Prevent Blindness.
- 2009: Silver Tier Fellow of the Association for Research in Vision and Ophthalmology (FARVO).
- 2014: Gold Tier Fellow of the Association for Research in Vision and Ophthalmology (FARVO).
- 2014: SUNY Chancellor's Award for Excellence in Scholarship and Creative Activities.
- 2014: UB Distinguished Professor, University at Buffalo/SUNY.
- 2017: Dean's Award in Ophthalmology and Neuroscience, LSU School of Medicine.
- 2018: SUNY Distinguished Professor, University at Buffalo/SUNY.
- 2018-19: President, Association for Research in Vision and Ophthalmology (ARVO).
- 2019: The Nanqiang Memorial Lecture, Xiamen Medical University.
- 2019: The Sydney Futterman Memorial Lecture, University of Washington, School of Medicine.
- 2021: Chair Professor of Ophthalmology, Wenzhou Medical University.
- 2023: Retina Research Foundation (RRF) Paul Kayser International Award in Retina Research; International Society for Eye Research (ISER).
- 2023: Chancellor's Award Lecture in Ophthalmology & Neuroscience, LSU Health Sciences Center, Neuroscience Center of Excellence.
- 2023: Keynote Lecture, European Frontiers in Neurosciences (EFN23), University of Catania.
- 2024: Keynote Lecture, Bench-to-Bedside Symposium, Charité Universitätsmedizin Berlin.
- 2024: Keynote Lecture: 24th International Congress of Ophthalmology and Optometry China (COOC 2024), Shanghai.

== Professional Memberships ==
Fliesler is an active member of various professional societies and organizations, including:

- American Association for the Advancement of Science (AAAS).
- American Oil Chemists' Society (AOCS).
- American Society for Biochemistry and Molecular Biology (ASBMB).
- American Society for Cell Biology (ASCB).
- Association for Research in Vision and Ophthalmology (ARVO).
- Sigma Xi- The National Research Honor Society.

== Selected publications ==
- Cholesterol homeostasis in the vertebrate retina: Biology and pathobiology. Journal of Lipid Research. 2021; 62.
- Rapid retinal degeneration caused by rod-specific Dhdds ablation without concomitant inhibition of protein N-glycosylation. iScience 2020; 23.
- Oxysterols and retinal degeneration in a rat model of Smith-Lemli-Opitz syndrome: Implications for an improved therapeutic intervention. Molecules. 2018; 23(10).
- Compromised phagosome maturation underlies RPE pathology in cell culture and whole animal models of Smith-Lemli-Opitz syndrome. Autophagy. 2018; 14(10).
- Prevention of retinal degeneration in a rat model of Smith-Lemli-Opitz syndrome. Scientific Reports. 2018; 8(1).
- Differential cytotoxic effects of 7-dehydrocholesterol-derived oxysterols on cultured retina-derived cells: Dependence on sterol structure, cell type, and density. Exp Eye Res. 2016; 145.
- Membrane morphogenesis in retinal rod outer segments: inhibition by tunicamycin. Journal of Cell Biology. 1985; 100.
- Photoreceptor-specific degeneration caused by tunicamycin. Nature (London). 1984; 311.
- Chemistry and metabolism of lipids in the vertebrate retina. Progress in Lipid Research. 1983; 22.
- Metabolism of mevalonic acid in cell-free homogenates of bovine retinas: formation of novel isoprenoid acids. Journal of Biological Chemistry. 1983; 258.
