= Sino-American =

Sino-American may refer to:

- Chinese Americans, Americans of Chinese ancestry
- China–United States relations

== See also ==
- American Chinese (disambiguation)
- Sino-American cuisine
