= School of International Studies =

School of International Studies may refer to:

- Jackson School of International Studies, University of Washington, U.S.
- Josef Korbel School of International Studies, University of Denver, U.S.
- School of Advanced International Studies, Johns Hopkins University, U.S.
  - SAIS Europe, Bologna, Italy
- School of International Studies, Jawaharlal Nehru University, Delhi, India
- S. Rajaratnam School of International Studies, Nanyang Technological University, Singapore
- TU Dresden School of International Studies, Germany
- School of International Studies, Simon Fraser University, Canada
- School of International Studies, Universidad Santa María (Venezuela), Caracas, Venezuela
- School of International Studies (Wenzhou Medical University)

== See also ==
- List of international relations schools
