= Beijing EMS =

Public ambulance service in Beijing, China

Beijing EMS is a system of public ambulances in the city of Beijing that provide medical transport to hospitals for a fee.

The United States embassy in China advises Americans that they "may be required to take taxis or other immediately available vehicles to the nearest major hospital" rather than wait for an ambulance, which is unlikely to have sophisticated medical equipment or well-trained personnel. Ambulances registered outside of Beijing may charge lower fees than Beijing-registered providers.

Ambulance operators include Beijing Emergency Medical Center, which was founded in 1983 as a collaboration between the Chinese and Italian governments.
