= Consulate General of the United States, Guangzhou =

American consulate in Guangdong, China

Consulate General of the United States of America, Guangzhou
- 美国驻广州总领事馆
- Seal of the United States Consulate General in Guangzhou

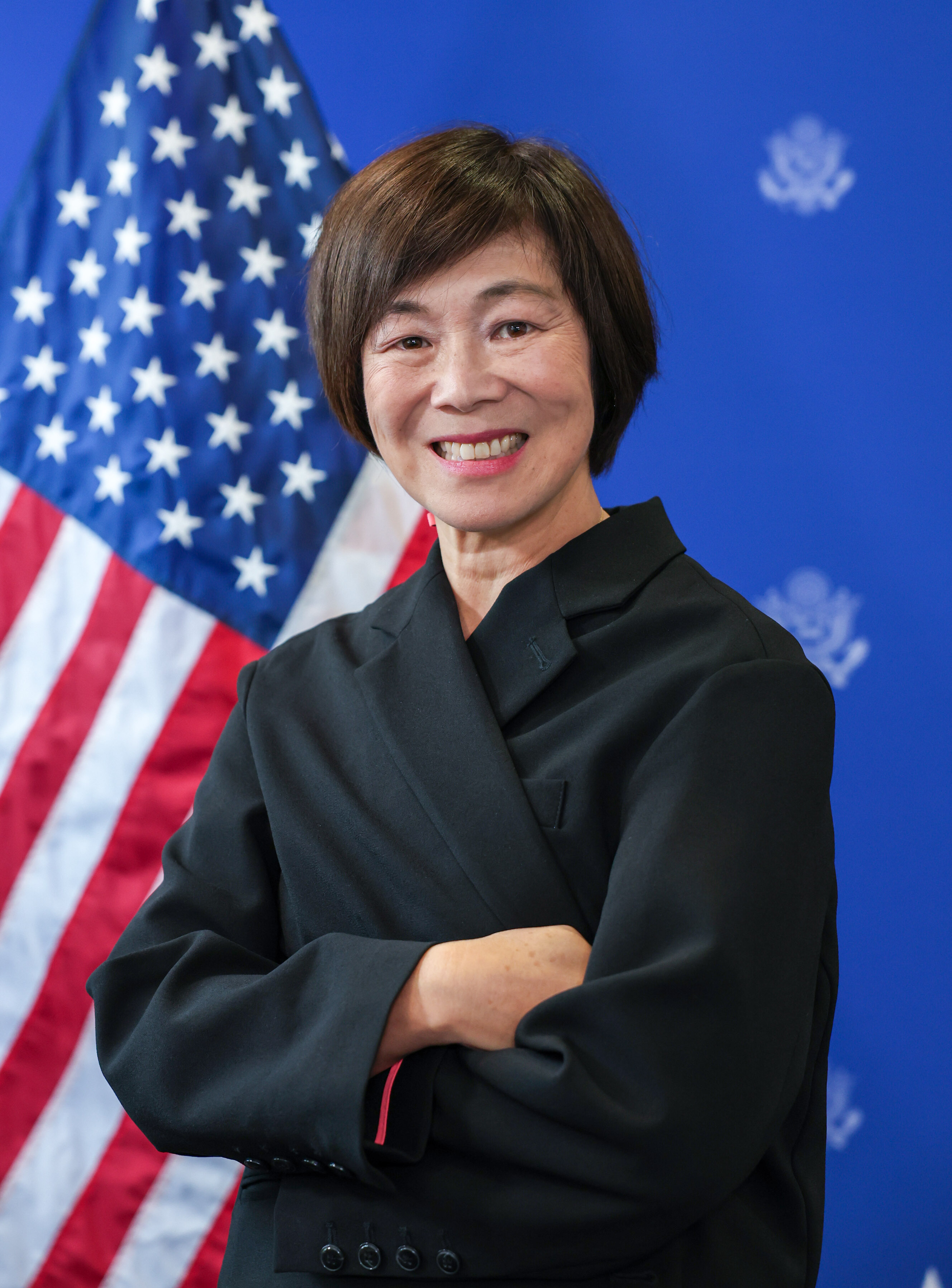
- Incumbent; Pauline A. Kao since August 2024
- Residence: 23°7′10″N 113°18′54″E
- Formation: 1843
- Website: china.usembassy-china.org.cn/embassy-consulates/guangzhou/

Consulate General of the United States, Guangzhou
- Simplified Chinese: 美国驻广州总领事馆
- Traditional Chinese: 美國駐廣州總領事館
Transcriptions
Standard Mandarin
- Hanyu Pinyin: Měiguó zhù Guǎngzhōu Zǒnglǐngshìguǎn
Yue: Cantonese
- Jyutping: mei5 gwok3 zyu3 gwong2 zau1 zung2 ling5 si6 gun2

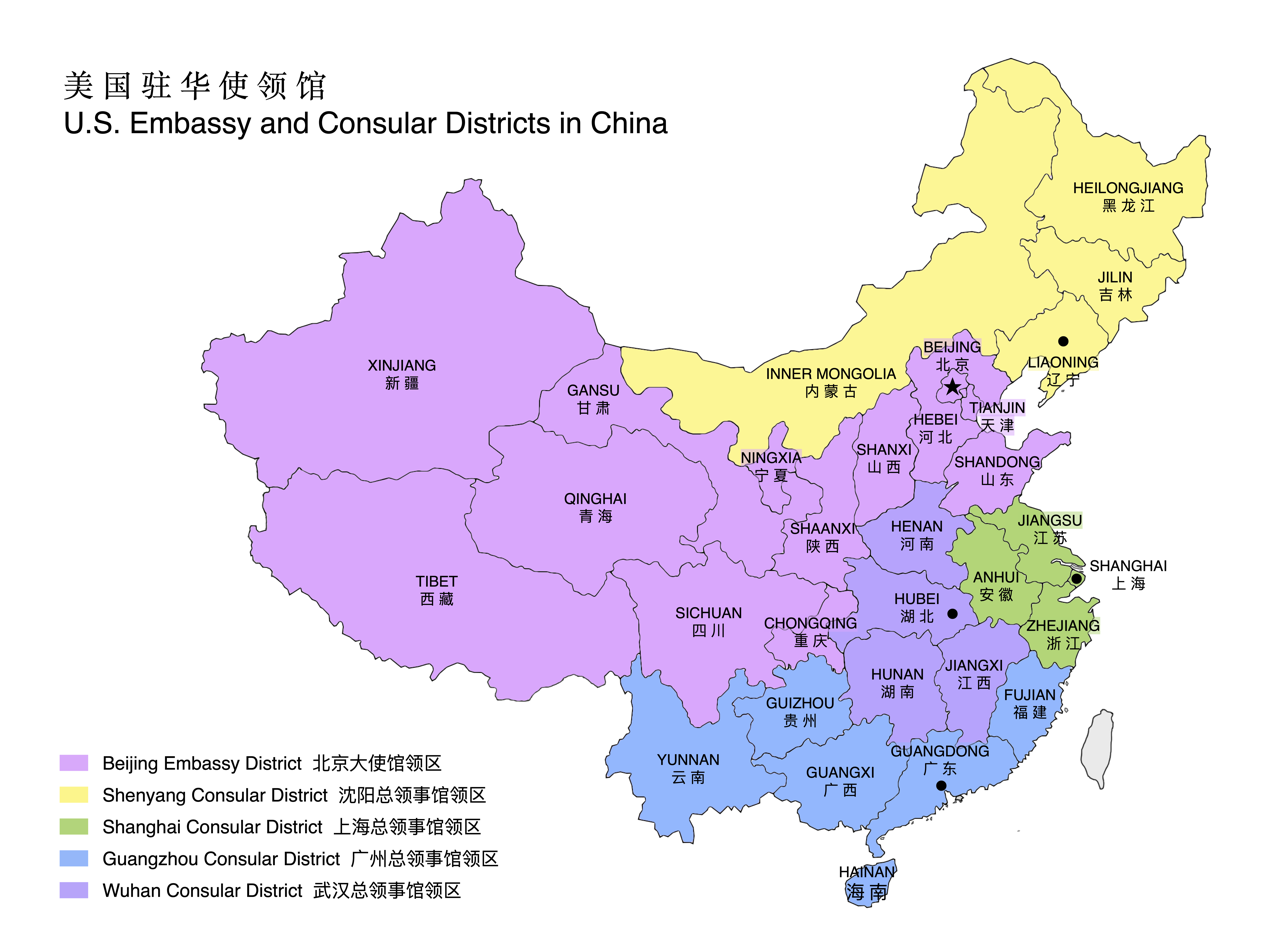
Area in blue color denotes the consular district of Consulate General Guangzhou

The Consulate General of United States, Guangzhou (Chinese: 美国驻广州总领事馆) is one of seven American diplomatic and consular posts in China. It is one of America's earliest diplomatic posts in the Far East. The consulate serves the South China region, covering the provinces of Guangdong, Hainan and Fujian, and the Guangxi Zhuang Autonomous Region, an area which, according to the latest census in 2020, has a resident population of over 220 million. The consulate general is also the only U.S. mission in mainland China to process American adoptions and immigrant visas, making it one of the U.S. Department of State's busiest consular-related posts.

== History of the consulate ==
=== Beginning ===
The beginning of the American consulate in Guangzhou dates back over two centuries to the founding years of the American republic, even before George Washington was elected as the first President of the United States. Consulate Guangzhou (known as Canton at that time), as America's oldest diplomatic post in China and one of America's oldest posts in the Far East, has played a pivotal role in promoting America's relationship with China. In 1784, the American merchant ship Empress of China reached what was then known as the port of Canton transporting ginseng to trade for Chinese black tea. The ship also carried on it Major Samuel Shaw, a 29-year-old former Revolutionary War artillery officer, who served as the business agent for this first American trade effort to the "Middle Kingdom." Shaw wrote to Secretary of Foreign Affairs John Jay, recommending that the young United States appoint a consul and vice consul to Canton. "Such officers," he noted, "would have a degree of weight and respect which private adventurers cannot readily acquire, and which would enable them to render essential services to their countrymen." Major Shaw was appointed the first American consul to China, although he would serve "with neither salary nor perquisites but with the confidence and esteem of the United States."

Samuel Snow (1758–1838) was Consul to Canton from his appointment on 14 May 1798 to 1806.

=== Traders, treaties, and diplomats ===
At that time, Chinese authorities limited trade with the outside world to the port of Canton. All foreign traders were further restricted to living and working on factory compounds established on the banks of the Pearl River. American trade with China increased steadily throughout the early decades of the nineteenth century, although there were long periods during which the office of the U.S. Consul at Canton was unoccupied, and Americans serving at the consulate typically did not speak Chinese. In the wake of the Opium War between China and Great Britain, however, the Chinese government was compelled to expand trading opportunities beyond Canton. After the conclusion of the hostilities, the first U.S. formal mission to China, led by former Congressman Caleb Cushing, brokered the 1844 Treaty of Wanghia, an agreement which secured trading privileges for American merchants and opened new Chinese ports to American vessels. In addition to protecting the interests of United States merchants, American consuls enjoyed greater authority granted by Congress; in 1848 the consulate was allowed to arraign U.S. citizens charged with offenses against the laws of China. The Canton consulate was burned down in 1856, but U.S. diplomats continued to support an expanding American presence in the region throughout the nineteenth century.

Aside from Guangzhou, U.S. Consulates were present in South China in the other opened ports of Fuzhou and Xiamen. However, due to a parsimonious and semi-isolationist U.S. Congress, these consulates frequently remained unoccupied. In fact, British and German officials were often asked to represent U.S. interests. This continued until the mid-1880s when the Shanghai Consul General began administering all consular services in China. At other times, the U.S. Consulate in Guangzhou also shared this responsibility.

=== Years of turmoil and change ===
With the concurrence of the British government, the U.S., in 1873, built a consulate on Shamian Island, a sandy one kilometer long strip of land around which a man-made canal had been dug ten years before to separate it from the rest of the city. Along with their European counterparts, foreign diplomatic personnel tried to recreate a Western lifestyle. They built Anglican and Catholic churches, tennis courts, an indoor swimming pool, and long promenades. Today, visitors to Shamian Island can still see the vestiges of late eighteenth century and nineteenth century Western life.

While life on Shamian was peaceful and stable, life off of the island for the Chinese was not. Increasing dissatisfaction with the Qing Dynasty led to protests and its eventual overthrow. The Second Sino-Japanese War precipitated the withdrawal of consulate personnel in Fuzhou in 1934 and Canton in 1938. Subsequent to Japan's surrender to the Allies, many U.S. Consulates in China reopened. For several months in 1949, after the Chinese Nationalist government moved its headquarters from Nanjing to Guangzhou, Shamian Island served as the site of the State Department's "Office of Embassy." As the civil war raged between Chinese Nationalist and Communist forces, the Nationalist government decided once again to move the seat of government to Chungking (Chongqing) and the Office of Embassy followed. Consulate Canton itself was closed in August 1949, and diplomatic relations between the communist government of mainland China and the United States ceased shortly thereafter.

=== Reopening ===
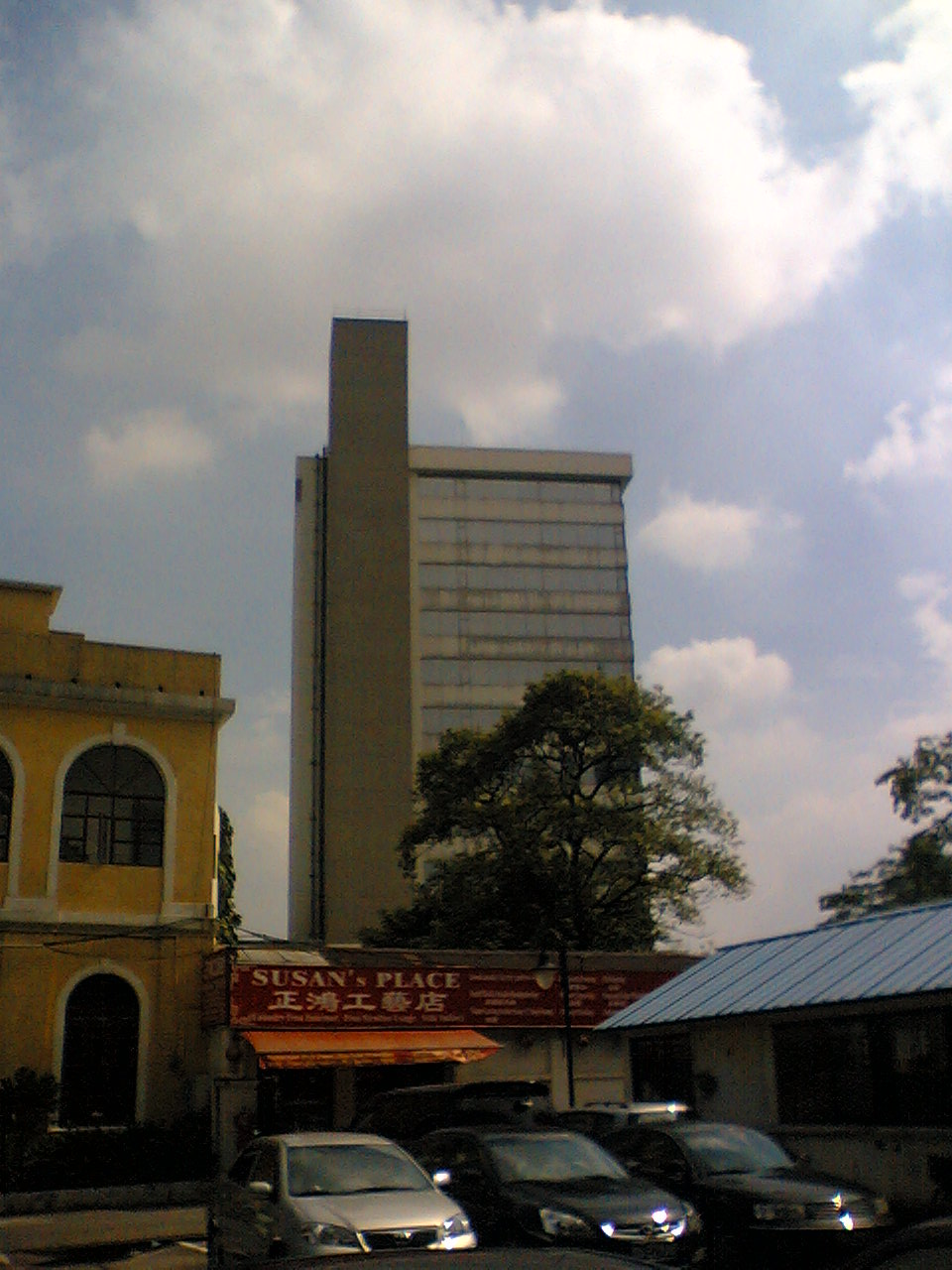
Former chancery on Shamian Island which housed the consulate general between 1990 and 2013.

In the wake of the landmark visits of Secretary of State Henry Kissinger and President Richard Nixon, the United States and China formally re-established diplomatic relations on January 1, 1979. According to an agreement, each country was allowed to set up two consulates. The United States chose Shanghai and Guangzhou (China chose San Francisco and Houston). On August 31, 1979, almost 30 years to the day that Consulate Canton had been closed, Vice-president Walter Mondale unveiled the seal for the new U.S. Consulate Guangzhou on the 11th floor of the Dongfang Hotel at 120 Liu Hua Road. Richard L. Williams was appointed the first Consul General in China since 1949. In April 1990, the Consulate returned to Shamian Island when the new Consulate Tower, built on reclaimed land near the Pearl River, was completed at 1 Shamian South Street, next to the White Swan Hotel.

Since reopening, the consulate's efforts have focused on two main issues: immigration and commerce. As South China has historically been the home for most Chinese immigrants to America, Guangzhou was designated as the sole immigrant visa processing post for all of China in the early 1980s. Additionally, in 1992 all adoption processing was assigned to Guangzhou. Immigrant and non-immigrant visa numbers have risen in the past 30 years. Whereas in 1979 the Consulate processed about 27,000 visa applicants (both non-immigrant and immigrant visas), today it adjudicates annually over 1 million applications. In order to better accommodate the rising number of applicants, on August 6, 2005, the consular section moved to a more spacious office facility at the Tianyu Garden Building on Linhe Zhong Road in Tianhe District. The facility had 30 interviewing windows available for 23 American staff and 100 locally employed personnel.

Meanwhile, the economic growth in South China, and particularly the Pearl River Delta (or PRD, the region surrounding the Pearl River from Shenzhen to Zhuhai) has been extraordinary. Since 1980, the GDP of the Pearl River Delta region has grown annually at 16 percent and about 1/3 of all of China's global exports originate from this area of 35 million people. In view of such growth, in 1985 the Department of Commerce opened a Foreign Commercial Service Office and the Department of Agriculture opened a Foreign Agricultural Office in the China Hotel on Liuhua Road. The public affairs section, located in the Garden Hotel, distributed press releases and backgrounders on American policy, organised press conferences and other media events.

=== Attack accusations ===
In May 2018, an American state employee reported sickness after hearing disturbing sounds. A week later, a security engineering officer, his wife, and their two kids were evacuated for having similar symptoms. After the Embassy attack accusations in Cuba, state officials have launched an investigation into these unexplained health incidents.

== New consulate compound ==
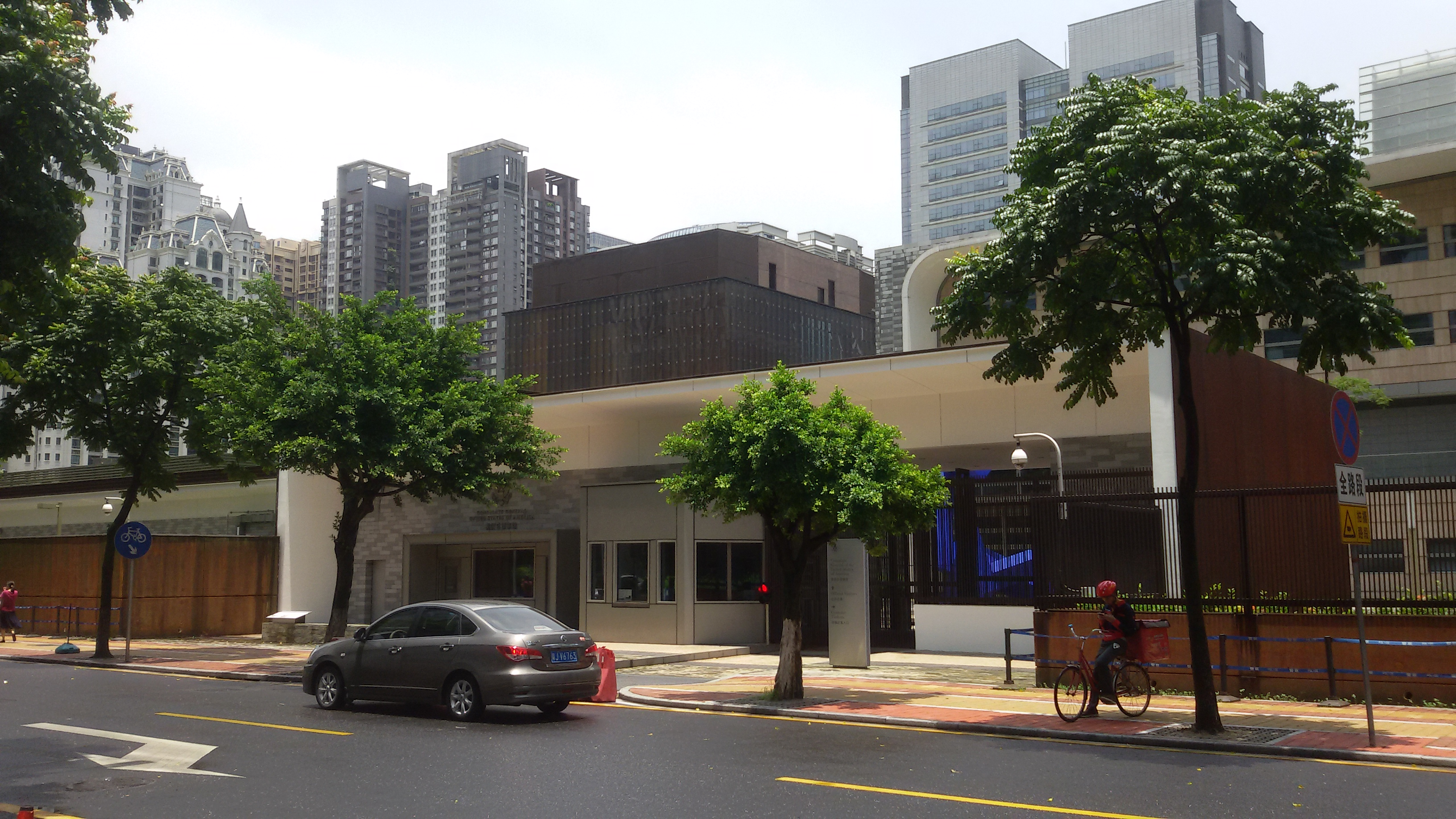
The new consulate compound in Zhujiang New Town

The new consulate-general compound is located in Zhujiang New Town, the newly developed CBD of the city. It is America's second purpose-built diplomatic facility in China, following the completion of the Beijing Embassy in 2008. The State Department spent $267 million on the project, as part of a multi-year, $1.5 billion building plan for the American missions in China. The groundbreaking ceremony was held in October 2009, attended by then U.S. Ambassador Jon Huntsman. The new consulate was designed by SOM, and constructed by two companies from China and America which employed more than 800 workers from both countries. Occupying a site of 7.4 acres, the consulate compound includes seven building of different functions situated in a garden setting. It was opened on 23 July 2013 and accommodated nearly 400 employees with consulate offices scattered around the city moving in. The consulate was officially unveiled in March 2014 with a ribbon cutting ceremony attended by U.S. Under Secretary of State Patrick Kennedy.

== See also ==
- List of diplomatic missions of the United States
- Embassy of the United States, Beijing
- Consulate General of the United States, Chengdu
- Consulate General of the United States, Shanghai
- Consulate General of the United States, Shenyang
- Consulate General of the United States, Wuhan
- Americans in China
