= Eye Hospital of Wenzhou Medical University =

Geography
- Location: Wenzhou, Zhejiang, China
- Coordinates: 28.007268°N 120.671870°E

Organisation
- Type: Teaching
- Affiliated university: Wenzhou Medical College

Services
- Speciality: Ophthalmology & Optometry

History
- Founded: 1998

Links
- Website: www.wzeye.cn
- Lists: Hospitals in China
- Other links: Wenzhou Medical College, IMS

The Eye Hospital of Wenzhou Medical University is a public hospital in Wenzhou, Zhejiang, China. It is affiliated with Wenzhou Medical University.

The institute collaborates with the New England College of Optometry to offer a Joint MS/OD Degree of optometry and ophthalmology, in which participating students undertake clinical practice both in Wenzhou and Boston. The hospital is associated with national government programs including the Optometry Research Center (Ministry of Public Health), the key laboratory for visual science (Ministry of Health) and the National key lab, Optometry and Ophthalmology, and Vision Science (Ministry of Science and technology).

== Periodical ==
The Chinese Journal of Optometry & Ophthalmology, published since 1999, is a bimonthly journal, co-sponsored by China National Optometry Research Center and Wenzhou Medical College. It is the only academic journal of optometry in China.
