= Growing Up with Chinese =

- 成长汉语
- Genre: Educational television
- Directed by: Zhu Xiaomeng
- Presented by: Charlotte MacInnis
- Starring: Alec Odahara (田原皓); Wang Haocheng (王浩丞); Azi Guli (阿孜古丽)
- Original language: English with Mandarin Chinese segments
- No. of episodes: 100

Production
- Executive producer: Wang Feizhou
- Producer: Lai Yunhe
- Editors: Zhu Xiaomeng; Fan Lu
- Running time: 15 minutes

Original release
- Network: China Central Television
- Release: 2010 – 2011

Growing Up with Chinese (Chinese: 成长汉语; pinyin: Chéngzhǎng hànyǔ) is a TV program on CCTV-News (now CGTN), the English-language channel of China Central Television, that aims to teach Simplified Mandarin Chinese to teenagers, through the 300 most commonly spoken phrases. It currently consists of 100 episodes, each being 15 minutes in length. Each lesson features 3 short phrases, and a dramatical skit that's played two times.

Starting from August 2, 2010, it aired new lessons from Monday to Sunday at 17:15 and 00:15 BJT, and rebroadcast on the other days. In early April 2011, it was announced by CCTV-News that Growing Up with Chinese would cease broadcasting as of April 10, 2011 for reasons that were not made public. Later that same month, it was announced that the show was scheduled to continue broadcasting shortly, with planned releases scheduled for early May, but they were not released online until late June. Currently all the videos on the program's CCTV main page are down, but the episodes are otherwise available online through being reuploaded on other sites such as YouTube.

== Episode disposition ==
The skits are set in realistic situations and demonstrates useful phrases.

1. Dramatical skit with Hanzi subtitles
2. Host explains the phrases demonstrated in the skit
3. Dramatical skit with subtitles in English, Hanzi, and evt. pinyin
4. Host reviews the Chinese words by discussing their translation, meaning and pronunciation. The hanzi characters are not always shown with pinyin written underneath.
5. Primer section is when the host reviews grammar points, relevant to the episode's lesson
6. Cultural spotlight is when the host talks about Chinese culture, usually relevant to the skit's topic.
7. Animated skits demonstrating advanced phrases
8. Q&A is when the host reads and answers questions and messages sent by viewers.

== Plot ==
The dramatical skits (called dialogue sequences) follow the life of Mike, a foreign exchange student, as he begins living in China. The series starts with Xiaoming buying an American football in anticipation for Mike's arrival (E1). Soon after, we see Mike being escorted by their homeroom teacher (E2), before they arrive at the Wang household (E3-E4). In the living room, Xiaoming shows Mike a photobook of his family and friends (E5), before they head outside where they encounter Lanlan reading a "secret" book (E6). Later the same day, they prank auntie into preparing dinner earlier by turning the clock an hour forward (E7). During dinner, Auntie offers Mike a knife and fork instead of chopstick, before Mike tells them about his family (E8-E9).

The tenth episode is perhaps a stand-alone flashback, as there's no trace of Mike in this dramatical skit; Xiaoming laments that he's too late for the live NBA game on TV, until his father figures they've got the date wrong, meaning the show will air the day (E10). It's now the second day of Mike's stay, and auntie explains to her son that Mike is jetlagged and needs to sleep in today (E11). Xiaoming heads outside, where he plays ball with Lanlan (E12). Back home, Mike has finally awoken. Auntie tells him to put on some slippers, while she prepares some breakfast for him (E13). Xiaoming has finally returned home, and the boys are sent out on an errand. En route, Mike asks where the post office is (E14).

== Cast and characters ==
The show is hosted by Charlotte MacInnis. The dramatic sequence section of Growing Up with Chinese stars Alec Odahara (田原皓), Wang Haocheng (王浩丞), and Azi Guli (阿孜古丽). The cast portrays students around the age of 14 i.e. prior to High School/College and were in fact of that age at the time of filming.

=== Main ===
- Mike (Alec Odahara) is an exchange student from North America.
- Wang Xiaoming (王小明, Wang Haocheng) is the son of Mike's host family.
- Lanlan (兰兰, Azi Guli) is Xiao Ming's childhood friend. The actress is a Uyghur ethnic minority who speaks perfect Chinese.

=== Recurring ===
- Xiaoming's mother
- Xiaoming's father

== Credits ==
- Text writer: Lu Yun
- English supervisor: Cheng Lei
- Supervisor: Fan Yun
- Sound: Liu Xueyong
- Light: Li Qi
- Make-up: Gao Ling, Jia Fanglin
- Camera: An Saigang, Li Qi
- Technician: Zhang Hao
- "Interactive Digital Blackboard kindly provided by Vtron Technologies Ltd."

== Episode guide ==
Episode	Dialogue sequence	Vocabulary and Phrases	Grammar Primer	Cultural spotlight
1 Greetings	Xiaoming is on his way home, after buying an American football, in preparation for Mike's arrival. The skit demonstrates how people greet each other in different ways depending on the context.	你好，您好，你们好，爷爷，早上好	Introduction to the four tones (diacritics: mā, má, mǎ, mà). Introduction to the neutral tone.	Physical greetings in China compared to the US
2 Thanks	Mike is escorted to the apartment of his host family by his teacher. The skit demonstrates how to thank people in different situations.	谢谢（您），没事（儿），不客气，不用谢	Use of negation (不) in basic expressions. Introduction to pinyin. Tonal pronunciation of 不 when preceding fourth-tone characters (不用谢).	Cultural rules of expressing thanks, familiar and formal settings.
3 Name	Mike finally meets Xiao Ming and the Wang family, to whom he introduces himself. The skit demonstrates how to ask someone their name and how to tell them your name.	我，姓，什么，名字，也，老师，我叫A，你叫什么名字？， 我姓B，叔叔，阿姨	Basic introductions, asking for and introducing by surname. Use of "What" in a sentence. Illustration of various vowel sound pairings in Pinyin pronunciation (i, e, ü).	Cultural rules of names, in particular emphasizing the surname in Chinese culture. Compares how to address a letter in China with addressing a letter in the United Kingdom.
4 Age	(Reuses dialogue sequence from previous episode.)	你多大了？我（也）十六岁，你呢		

(This episode guide is incomplete.)
