= American Born Chinese =

American Born Chinese may refer to:

- American-born Chinese, Chinese people who were born in the United States
- American Born Chinese (graphic novel), by Gene Yang
- American Born Chinese (TV series), action-comedy television series

== See also ==
- Chinese American, citizens of the United States of America of Chinese descent
- Chinese-born American, a subset of Americans in China who were born in China with U.S. birthright citizenship having been born to an American citizen
- American Chinese (disambiguation)
