= NECO =

NECO may refer to:

- National Examination Council (Nigeria), responsible for educational examinations
- New England College of Optometry, a private college in Boston, Massachusetts
- National Ethnic Coalition of Organizations, original name of the Ellis Island Honors Society
