= Americans in China =

Ethnic group in China

Americans in China 在華美國人 在华美国人
Total population
- 110,000

Regions with significant populations
- Beijing, Hong Kong, Guangzhou and Shanghai

Americans in China (simplified Chinese: 在华美国人; traditional Chinese: 在華美國人; pinyin: zài huá měiguó rén) are expatriates and immigrants from the United States as well as their locally born descendants. Estimates range from 72,000 (excluding Hong Kong and Macau) to 110,000.

== Estimated number in China ==
In 2005, the number of Americans living in China reached a historic high of 110,000. Most expatriates living in China come from neighboring Asian nations. An estimate published in 2018 counted 600,000 people of other nations living in China, with 12% of those from the US; that means approximately 72,000 Americans living in China.

Based on data collected in 1999, when 64,602 Americans lived in China, most lived in Hong Kong (48,220 in 1999), with smaller numbers in Beijing (10,000), Guangzhou (3,200), Shanghai (2,382), Shenyang (555) and Chengdu (800).

=== Mainland China ===
According to the Sixth National Population Census of the People's Republic of China conducted in 2010, there are 71,493 Americans residing in mainland China, the second largest single group of foreign nationals behind Koreans. Americans have been coming to China for job opportunities since 1994. In the late 2000s and early 2010s, a growing number of Americans in their 20s and 30s headed to China for employment, lured by its faster-growing economy and good pay in the financial sector. Many of them teach English, a service in demand from Chinese businesspeople and students and a growing number are arriving with skills and experience in computers, finance and other fields.

Places with large international communities include the Chaoyang district, Dongcheng district, and Shunyi district in Beijing, Pudong and Puxi in Shanghai, and more.

=== Hong Kong ===
There are more Americans than Britons living in the territory, and 1,100 American companies employ 10% of the Hong Kong workforce. In addition, ships of the United States Navy made from 60 to 80 port visits each year, reported in 1998.

== History ==
In early modern China in the early 1900s, groups of Americans first entered China as missionaries, educators, and nurses, as part of organizations such as the Yale Foreign Missionary Society. These organizations founded important institutions in China such as Yenching University, which was later merged with Peking University. Other notable establishments include the founding or the co-development of medical schools. The children of missionaries and educators, having grown up in American households in China, grew up and contributed to the shaping of the US-China relationship.

Today, Americans have been moving to China for job opportunities since 1994. In the late 2000s and early 2010s, a growing number of Americans in their 20s and 30s headed to China for employment, lured by its faster-growing economy and good pay in the financial sector. Many of them teach English, a service in demand from Chinese businesspeople and students and a growing number are arriving with skills and experience in computers, finance and other fields. While working at international companies and schools provide an international community of peers and friends, many express that language and cultural barriers outside of their workplace makes it hard for them to truly fit in and develop a sense of belonging. Some has also expressed that the language barriers make administrative tasks particularly difficult. Being in a foreign country with no friends and families, many have also expressed loneliness and homesickness.

In recent years, there has been an increase in the number of foreign or expatriate scholars who have decided to work in Chinese universities and research institutions such as Tsinghua University. Its math department, the Yau Mathematical Sciences Center, is named after a Chinese-American mathematician Shing-Tung Yau. A number of students also choose to study abroad in China, in universities including Peking University and Tsinghua University.

== Institutions ==
American diplomatic missions in mainland China:

- Embassy of the United States, Beijing
- U.S. Consulate General Chengdu (closed)
- U.S. Consulate General Guangzhou
- U.S. Consulate General Shanghai
- U.S. Consulate General Shenyang
- U.S. Consulate General Wuhan

The Consulate General of the United States, Hong Kong and Macau serves Hong Kong and Macau.

== Education ==
=== International schools ===
Due to the increasing number of international (including American) communities in China, there has been an increased demand for an international education, which usually means American or British educational system, such as AP or IB. International schools often hire teachers from countries such as the US, Canada, UK, and Australia, and only accepts non-Chinese students. These schools often offer a secluded international community for teachers and students that imitates American or British high schools. While providing a Western-styled education helps establish a stronger sense of connection between students with their country of citizenship and/or origin, being in an international school also often lead to disconnection to local culture. Many schools even try to segregate themselves from the local community by providing school bus services to decrease local interaction. Some has expressed that since the school would operate the same way no matter where it operates, it is hard to feel that they live and go to school in China.

American international schools in mainland China:

- Beijing Saint Paul American School
- Changchun American International School
- Concordia International School Shanghai
- QSI International School of Chengdu
- Dalian American International School
- American International School of Guangzhou
- International School of Beijing
- Shanghai American School
- Shanghai Livingston American School
- Shenzhen American International School
- Suzhou North America High School

American international schools in Hong Kong:

- American International School Hong Kong
- Hong Kong International School

=== Self-identification of young Americans in China ===
The previously described seclusive international community international school provides on one hand provides a place where students can interact with people who share a more similar cultural background, but also causes a disconnect between a student and the city they grow up in. While they live physically in China, the limited contact they have with local communities and the sheerly different environment their schools offer make them ignorant about their surrounding culture. Students have expressed that while they have lived most of their lives in a Chinese city, they feel that they are completely disconnected and ignorant about the city, and even feel more comfortable living in places they spend their summers in, such as the U.S.. This often causes students to lose a sense of belonging. Many has also expressed exclusionary attitudes towards local Chinese people.

== Notable people ==
- Solomon Adler - Economist
- Ai Hua (Charlotte MacInnis) - Chinese television presenter
- Elijah Coleman Bridgman - Protestant Christian missionary
- Frank Coe - United States government official
- Erwin Engst - advisor to the People's Republic to China
- Joan Hinton - nuclear physicist
- William H. Hinton - farmer and prolific writer
- Dayyan Eng - feature film director
- Isabel Ingram - tutor of Wanrong, Empress and wife of the last Emperor of China
- Kaiser Kuo - Musician and Baidu employee
- Henry Luce - journalist and businessman
- William Francis Mannix - Author and forger
- Stephon Marbury - basketball player
- American McGee - game designer
- Gideon Nye - diplomat, art collector, and merchant
- Manya Reiss - Founding member of the Communist Party USA (CPUSA)
- Sidney Rittenberg - journalist, interpreter and scholar
- Glenn Duffie Shriver - Studied in Shanghai, arrested in the United States for attempted espionage, to which he pleaded guilty
- Agnes Smedley - journalist and writer
- Edgar Snow - journalist
- Mike Sui - comedic actor
- Anna Louise Strong - journalist and activist
- John Leighton Stuart - First President of Yenching University
- Gerald Tannebaum - humanitarian and actor

== See also ==
- China-United States relations
- Immigration to China
- Chinese American
