= Fan Lu =

Fan Lu is a Chinese professor and Vice President of optometry at the Wenzhou Medical College from which she graduated in 1986. After graduation she became a resident in the field of ophthalmology at the Affiliated Eye Hospital of which she became a Vice Director as well. During the same time she was a Vice Director of the China National Optometry Research Center and in 2002 got her optometry degree from the New England College of Optometry. Currently she works as an eye surgeon and has at least five publications related to contact lenses.
