= Consulate General of the United States, Shenyang =

American consulate in Liaoning, China

Consulate General of the United States of America Shenyang
- 美国驻沈阳总领事馆
- Seal of the United States Consulate General in Shenyang

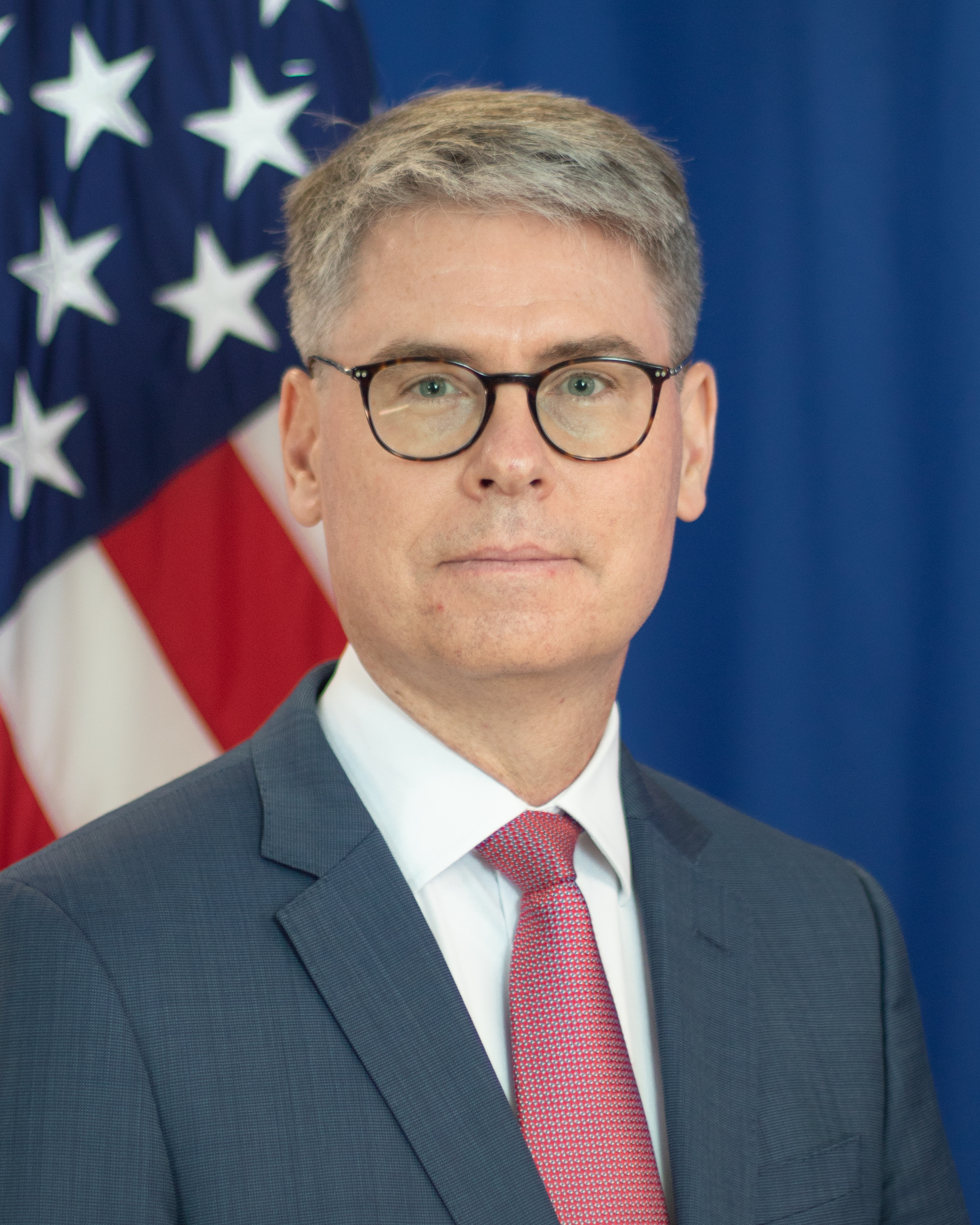
- Incumbent; William M. Coleman, IV since August 2024
- Residence: 41.7833°N 123.4264°E
- Formation: 1904 (to Qing Dynasty); 1984 (to PRC)
- Abolished: 1949-1984
- Website: china.usembassy-china.org.cn/embassy-consulates/shenyang/

The Consulate General of the United States, Shenyang (simplified Chinese: 美国驻沈阳总领事馆; traditional Chinese: 美國駐瀋陽總領事館; pinyin: Měiguó zhù Shěnyáng Zǒnglǐngshìguǎn) is one of five American diplomatic and consular posts in the People's Republic of China. It is located in Heping District, Shenyang, Liaoning.

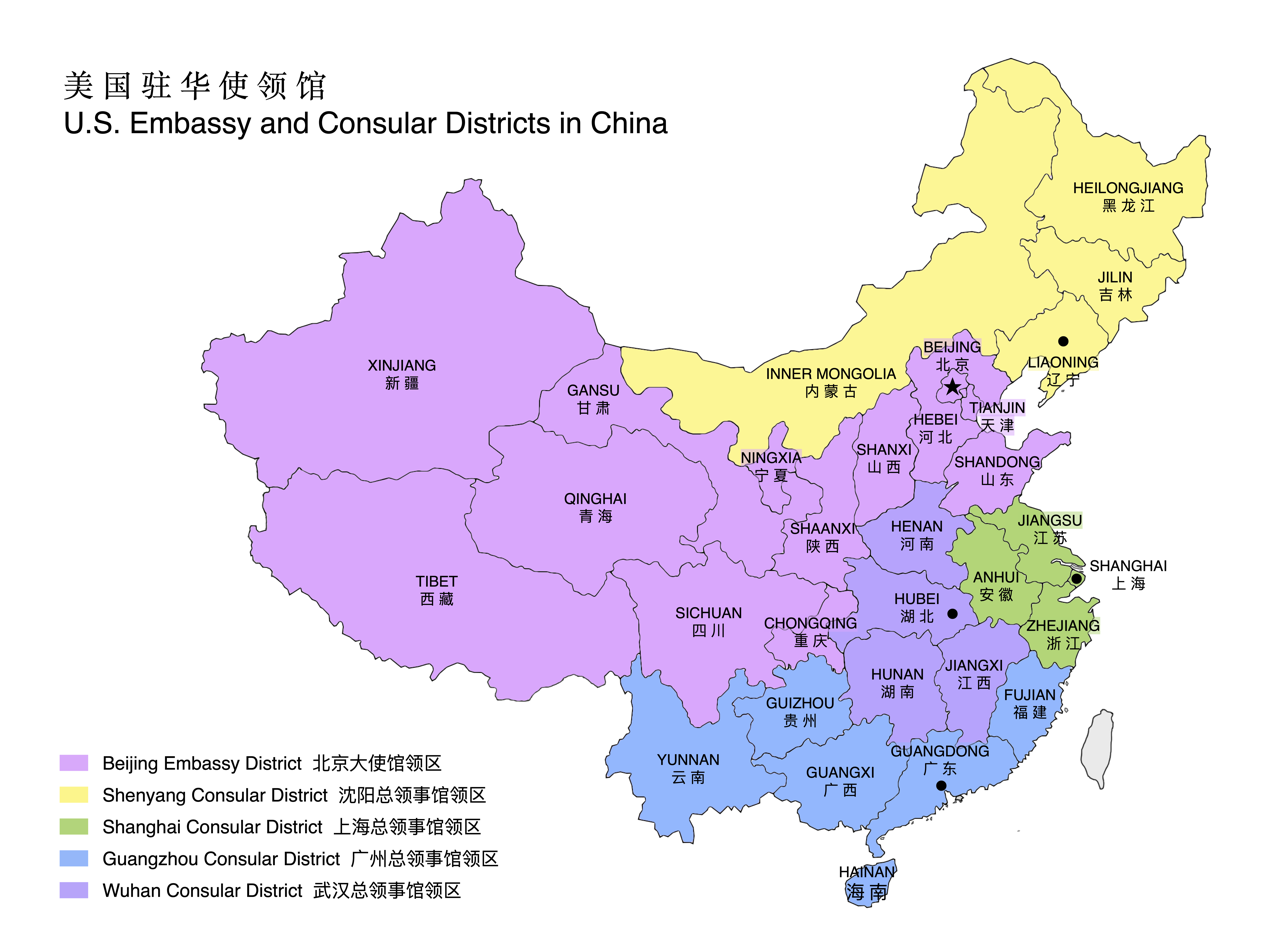
The yellow area is the Shenyang consular district

== History ==
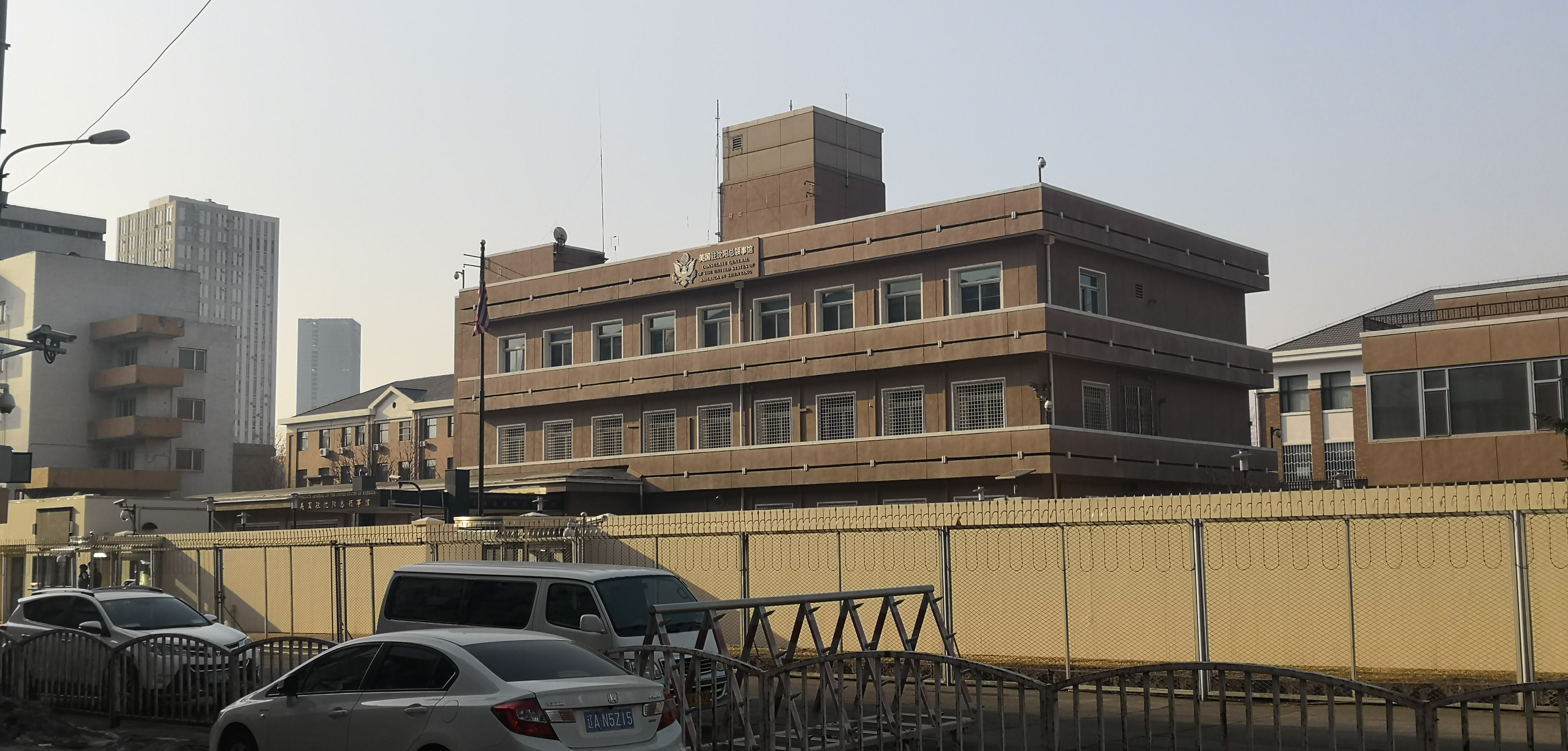
Consulate General of the United States in Shenyang

The U.S. Consulate in Shenyang was opened in 1904. It was originally housed in two abandoned Chinese temples, "Temples 'Yi Kung Ssu' and 'Scwang Chen Ssu' located outside the Little West Commerce Gate." Sometime before 1924, the Consulate moved to No. 1 Wu Wei Lu, a building which used to house the Russian Consulate. At the time, the United States had several other Consulates in Northeast China, including in Harbin and Dalian. These appear to have been closed by World War II. The Shenyang Consulate operated for most of the war and closed in 1949 after the new Chinese Communist Party authorities had imprisoned the remaining consulate staff in their offices for almost a year before expelling them. In 1984, five years after the United States recognized and formally established diplomatic relations with the government in Beijing, the Consulate reopened.

== Consuls general ==
- William M. Coleman, 2024–present
- Sara Yun, 2022–2024
- Nancy Abella, 2019–2022
- Gregory May 2017 – 2019
- Scott Weinhold, 2013-2017
- Sean Stein, 2010–2013
- Stephen Wickman, 2007-2010
- David Kornbluth, 2004-2007
- Mark Kennon, 2002-2004
- Angus Taylor Simmons, 1999-2002
- Gerard R. Pascua (including 1994)
- Morton Holbrook III, 1990–1993
- Carl Eugene "Gene" Dorris, 1987–1990
- John A. "Jack" Froebe, 1986–1987
- James Hall, 1984–1986

== See also ==
- List of diplomatic missions of the United States
- U.S. Embassy Beijing
- U.S. Consulate General Chengdu
- U.S. Consulate General Guangzhou
- U.S. Consulate General Shanghai
- U.S. Consulate General Wuhan
- Americans in China
