= Ai Hua =

American television personality

- Born: Charlotte MacInnis; February 21, 1981 (age 44); Michigan, United States
- Occupation: Host/Media

Ai Hua is the stage name of Charlotte MacInnis (Michigan; born 1981), an American TV personality in China, also known by the Chinese name Mu Aihua (Chinese: 穆爱华; pinyin: Mù Àihuá; lit. 'Mu Love China').

Since the age of 10, she has studied and participated in various events of the Chinese culture that have led her into various roles throughout Chinese media. Her most recent work has been with China Central Television as the host of Growing Up with Chinese.

== Earlier Years ==
MacInnis was born in Michigan, in the United States, but moved to Nanjing, Jiangsu, China in 1988 when she was 7 years old. Her ancestry is composed of Scottish and Norwegian descent. She lived there for 7 years before moving to Beijing in 1995. Growing up, she has stated that she has always felt more connected with China than the United States due to spending most of her childhood there. After spending 3 years in Beijing, she was admitted to Columbia University's Theatre Department where she performed in plays and roles in both American and Chinese versions.. She has gone on to star and perform in various other works of media as she has advanced in her career.

== Works ==
- Film: "Earth Dancing" decorated as Emma
- Television drama: "Love Card" decorated female II Sofia "Family Harmony" decorated supporting role Rachel "through the passion," decorated supporting Suzanne
- The role of Lin Na for the "Practical Chinese Reader" series of Mandarin language learning textbooks.
- Drama: Shanghai Dramatic Arts Centre English "Woman of the Last Day" in English at Columbia University.
- 2005 China International Cartoon and Animation Festival in Hangzhou art show opening - Zhejiang TV broadcast
- 2005 11th Shanghai TV Festival "Magnolia Award" Presentation Ceremony and Closing Ceremony - Oriental TV broadcast
- 2005 Seventh Liuyang International Fireworks Festival art show opening - China Central Television broadcast
- Luoyang Peony Fair in 2005 a large star concert - Henan TV broadcast
- In 2006, China - Chongqing Seventh Dianjiang Peony Festival Opening Ceremony for cultural exchange - Chongqing TV broadcast Luoyang Peony Fair 2007 opening ceremony of "one thousand Peony" stamps Festival - Luoyang TV broadcast
- 2007 BOC Let's sing a song with the Bank of China Henan Branch Spring a large party - Henan TV broadcast
- China Central Television, "to challenge it."
- CCTV "Cross Over" (English Channel, is currently one of the hosts)
- Central Educational Television "study in the U.S."
- Central Educational Television, "America the new TOEFL."
- Central Radio and TV University, "the new reality of Chinese"
- Beijing TV Station "international double-line"
- Beijing TV Station, "the Chinese foreign Talent Competition 2004"
- Beijing TV Station, "the Chinese foreign Talent Competition 2005"
- Beijing TV Station, "the Chinese foreign Talent Competition 2006"
- Beijing TV Station, "the Chinese foreign Talent Competition 2007"
- Beijing TV Station, "a large public arena song" 2004 large-scale environmental party
- Beijing TV Station, "Steady" 2007 Hesuiban special program
- Henan TV "The Legendary spring" Spring Festival Gala
- Liaoning TV talk show 2006 fashion health "health of danger."
- Suzhou TV first (2007) Yangtze River Delta region, "foreign friends, China Talent Contest"

== Personal life ==
Charlotte can speak both American English and Mandarin Chinese fluently. She has stated that she has a fondness for pets, particularly dogs, and has owned many in the past.
