= Consulate General of the United States, Wuhan =

United States diplomatic mission in Hubei, China

- Seal of the United States Consulate General in Wuhan
- Location: Wuhan, Hubei, China
- Address: 396 Xinhua Road; Wuhan Minsheng Bank Building; Jiang'an District, Wuhan 430015
- Coordinates: 30.597°N 114.268°E
- Inaugurated: 2008
- Jurisdiction: Henan; Hubei; Hunan; Jiangxi
- Consul General: Leslie Hope
- Website: Official website

The Consulate General of the United States in Wuhan is one of the five American diplomatic and consular posts in mainland of the People's Republic of China.

First established in 1861, the U.S. Consulate General in Wuhan reopened in 2008 at 568 Jianshe Avenue in New World International Trade Tower I. It is the smallest consulate of the United States in China, providing emergency services to U.S. citizens in the region and promoting economic and cultural exchanges. On June 8, 2012, Gary Locke, then-U.S. ambassador to China, announced that the Consulate-General in Wuhan would be expanded to include full consular and visa services.

== History of the consulate ==
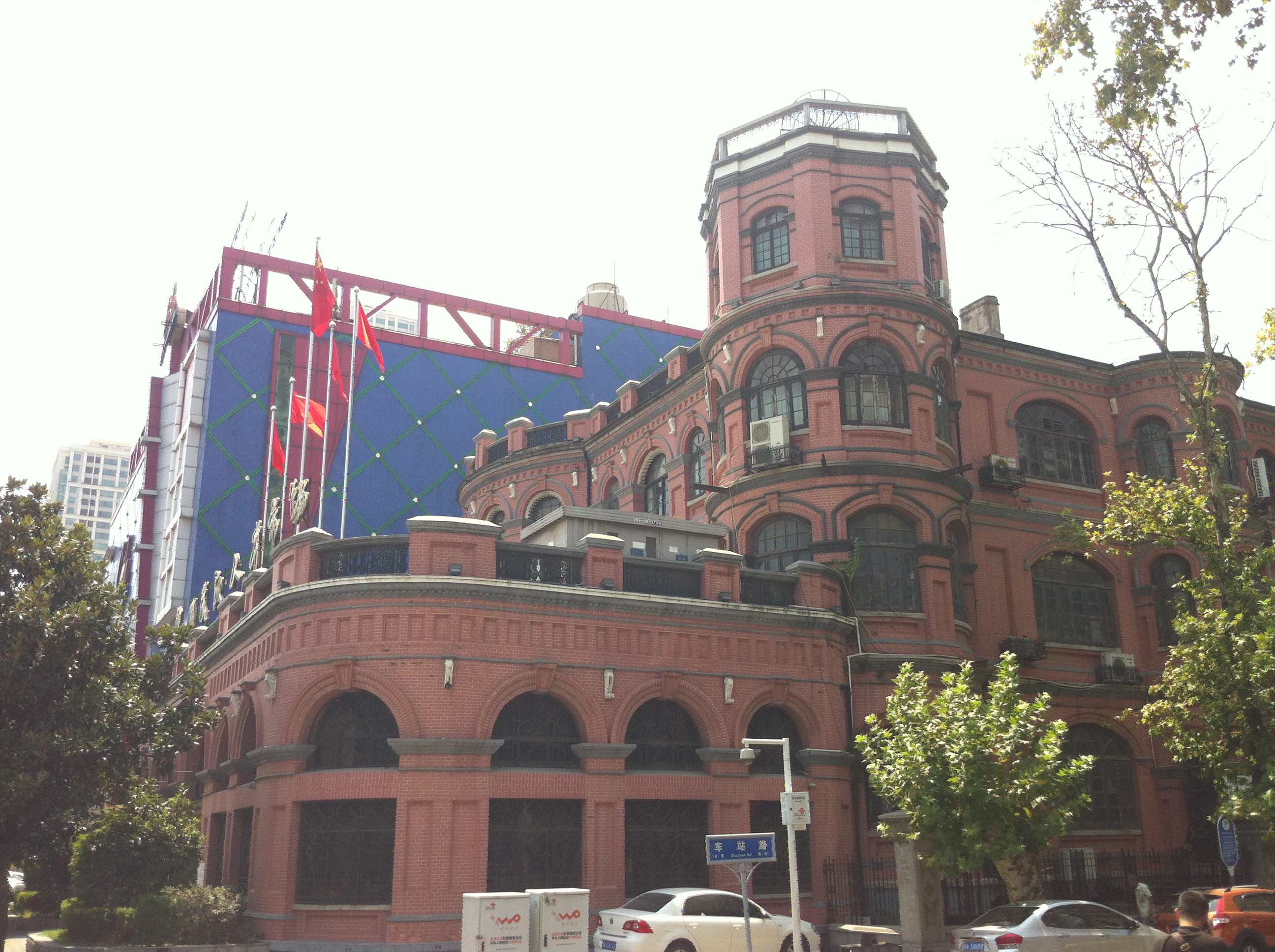
The former US Consulate General house in Hankou

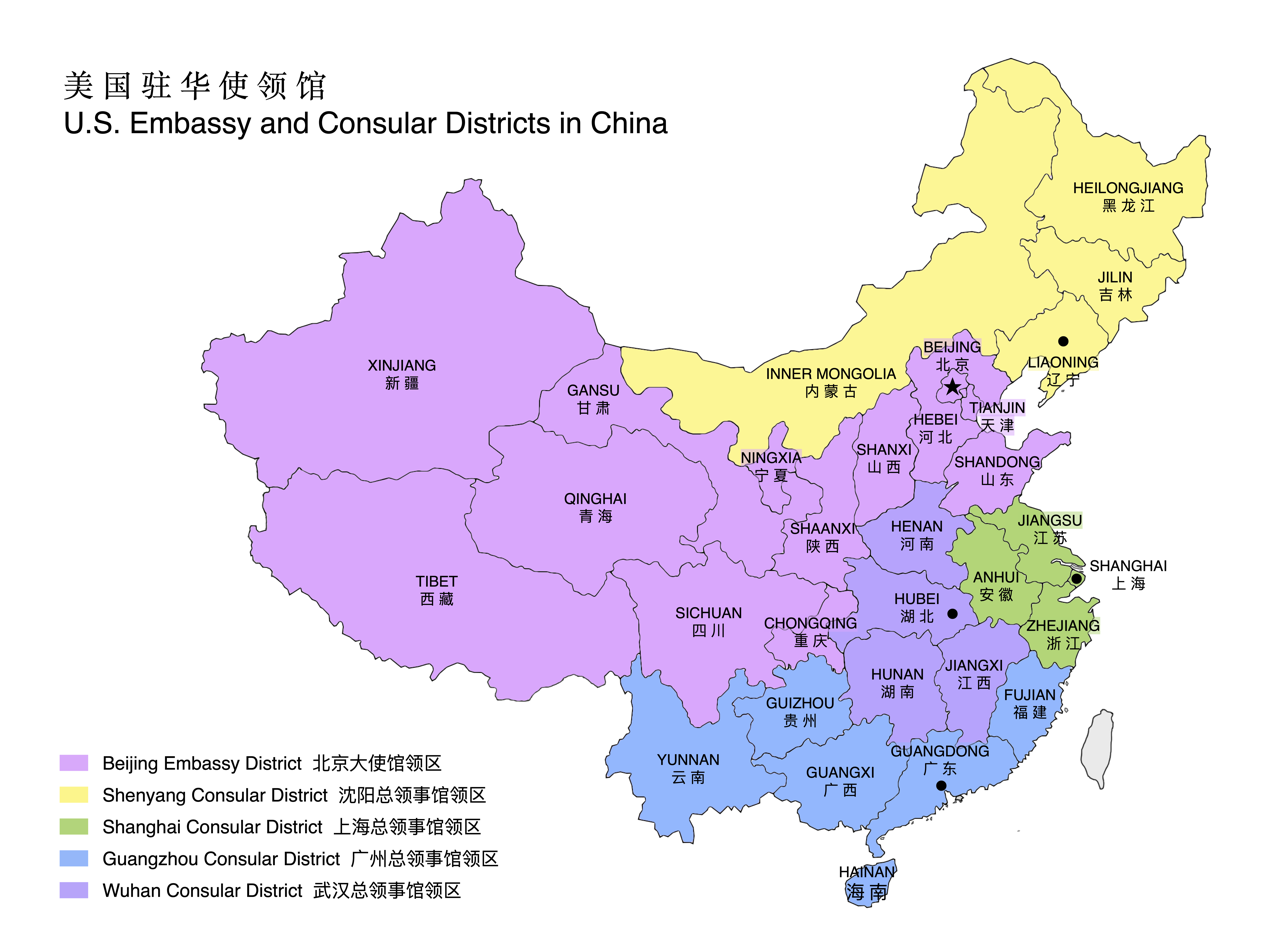
Area in violet colour denotes the consular district of Consulate General Wuhan

=== Beginning ===
The first American Consulate in Wuhan was opened in April 1861, one month after Hankow became one of China's treaty ports.

The old consulate built in 1905 was previously JK Panoff's Residence, located on the corner of the Bund with Station Road in the Hankow Russian Concession. It is a red baroque-style keep in brick and concrete structure. The consulate closed in 1949, after the end of Chinese Civil War. Now, the building has been transformed into the Wuhan Career Fair Building.

=== Reopening ===
The U.S. Consulate General Wuhan reopened in 2008 after an absence of nearly 60 years. The consulate's office is located in the New World International Trade Tower, in the Hankou region of Wuhan.

When it reopened as an American Presence Post (APP), it was staffed by one American Foreign Service Officer.

The Consulate General of the United States in Wuhan was established in November 2007 under the provisions of the 1981 U.S.-China Agreement on Consular Facilities. The Consulate General focuses on providing emergency services to American citizens in the region, promoting U.S. exports and fostering other aspects of our commercial and economic relations, and expanding cultural and educational exchanges between the U.S. and central China.

This is one of five American diplomatic and consular posts in the mainland of the People's Republic of China. The others are: the Embassy in Beijing, and consulate-generals in Guangzhou, Shenyang, and Shanghai.

=== Expanding ===
On February 10, 2017, U.S. Consulate-General in Wuhan broke ground on site of future office in Minsheng Bank Building. The construction was planned to start in February and to be completed in summer of 2018, by which time the consulate's capable of offering non-immigrant visa, American citizen services, and other consular services. The new consulate office will also include a large multi-purpose room which will be used to host American cultural events such as lectures, movie nights, art and music.

On March 28, 2024, U.S. Consulate-General in Wuhan held a dedication ceremony for its new facility at Minsheng Bank Building. In this new facility, U.S. Consulate-General in Wuhan starts offering expanded in-person services for U.S. citizens as well as nonimmigrant visa interview services.

== Consuls General ==
- Leslie Hope, 2026 – Present
- Christopher Green, 2024 – 2026
- Melissa Lan, 2021 – 2024
- Jamie Fouss, 2017 – 2021
- Joseph Zadrozny, 2014 – 2017
- Vlad Lipschutz, 2012 – 2014
- Diane Sovereign, 2010 – 2012
- Wendy Lyle, 2008 – 2010

== Gallery ==
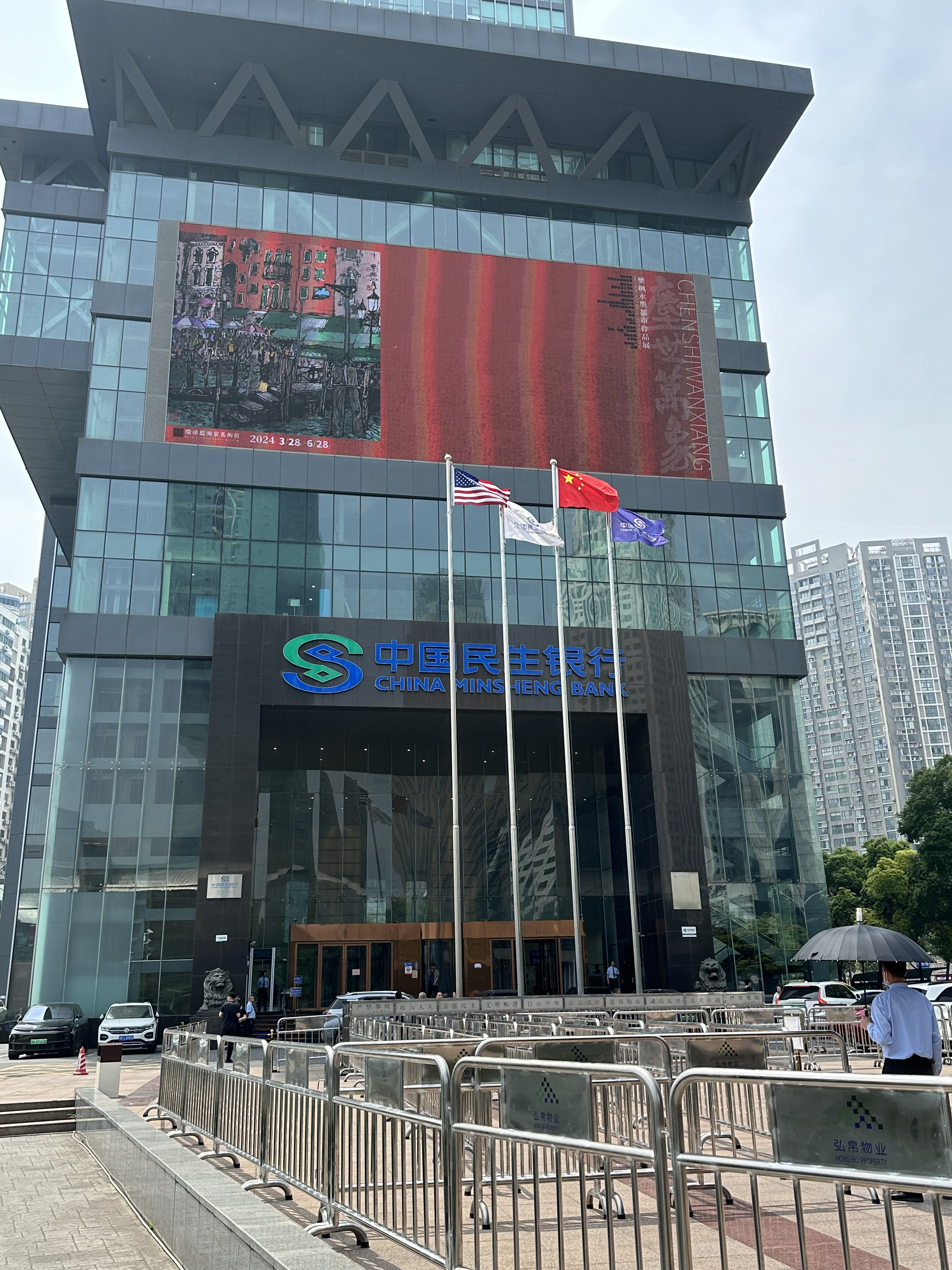
Building hosting the U.S. Consulate-General in Wuhan

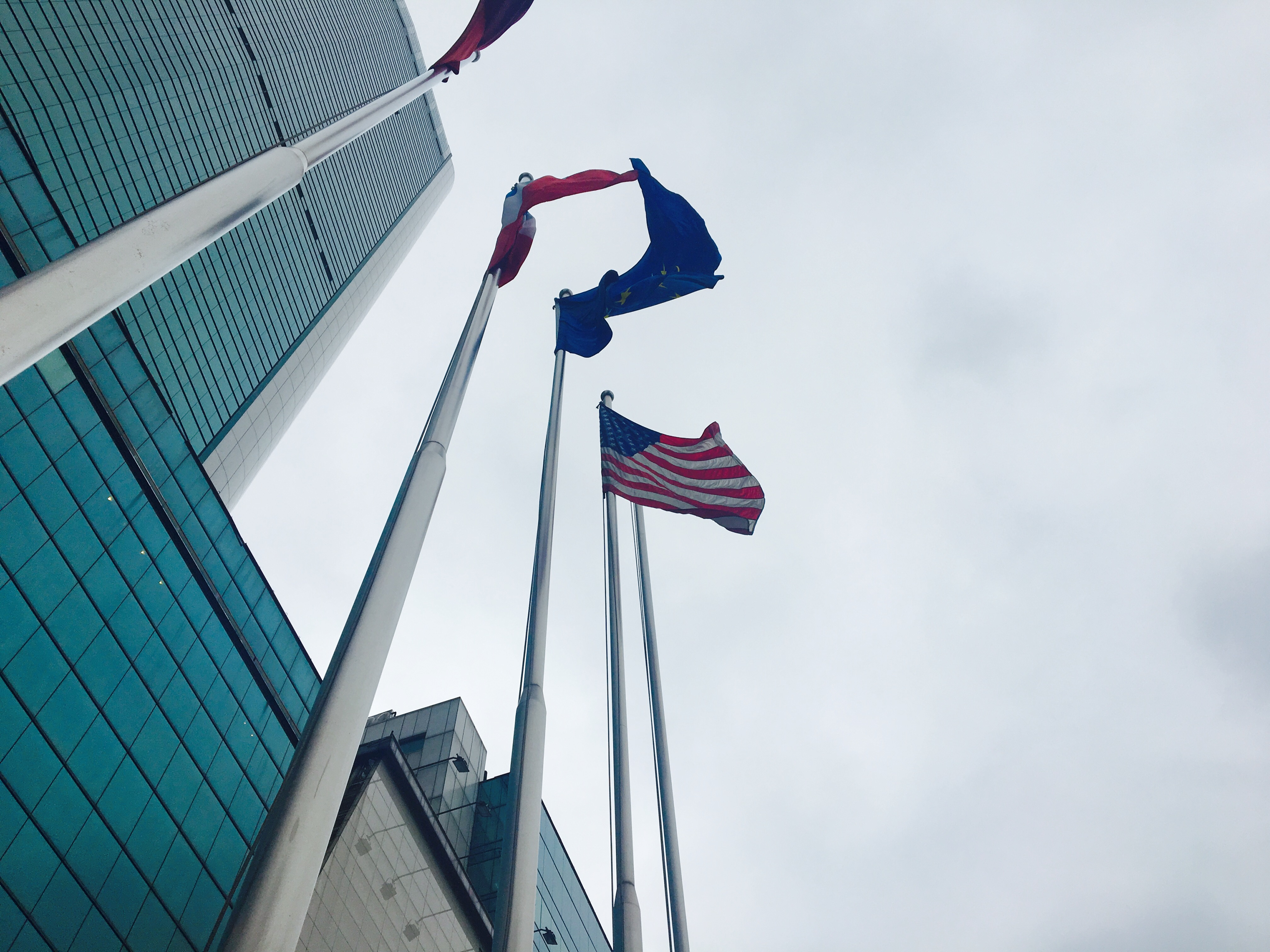
Waving American Flag in front of New World International Trade Tower, where Consulate-General of United States in Wuhan was located

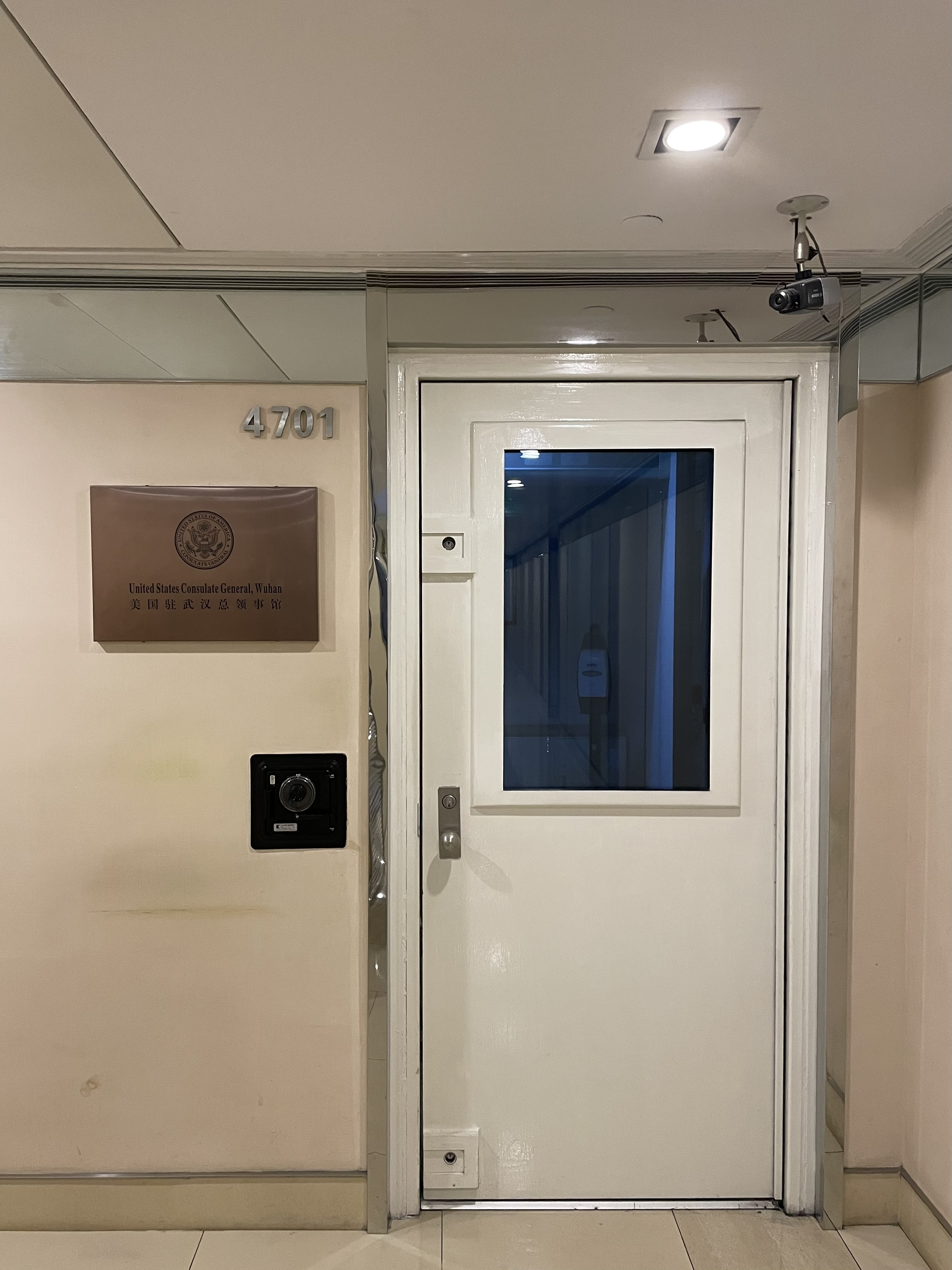
Previous location of the consulate on 47th floor of New World International Trade Tower. Main entrance to the consulate was equipped with Knox Box 4400 Series

== See also ==
- List of diplomatic missions of the United States
- U.S. Embassy Beijing
- U.S. Consulate General Guangzhou
- U.S. Consulate General Shanghai
- U.S. Consulate General Shenyang
- Americans in China
