= School of International Studies (Wenzhou Medical University) =

University in Wenzhou, China

- 温州医学大学国际教育学院
- Motto: Excellence • Honour • Compassion
- Type: Public
- Established: 2006
- Dean: Hu Zhen
- Undergraduates: 400
- Location: Wenzhou, Zhejiang Province, China
- Campus: Suburban, 73 Ha
- Website: sis.wmu.edu.cn

The School of International Studies is a school within Wenzhou Medical University. It operates medical degree programs for foreign students.

== History ==
Since the inception of the English-Medium Medical programs in China (circa 2006), a new school was added to the WMC - the School of International Studies (SIS) - which has a unique character required to match the unique task of training international students as future medical doctors as stipulated by the Ministry of Education. It is charged with running the International Medical School (IMS) and the Confucius Center at Burapha University (Thailand). Currently the student body consists of over 400 students, with a diversity comprising more than 40 nationalities.

== Organization ==
=== Departments ===
- Medical Department (MBBS)
- Dental Department (BDS)

=== Affiliated Hospitals ===
- The 1st Affiliated Hospital
- The 2nd Affiliated Hospital & Yuying Children's Hospital
- The Affiliated Hospital of Stomatology

These three hospitals, all located in the Wenzhou city, are principally tasked with supplying the practical portions of the students' medical/dental experience.

== See also ==
- Wenzhou Medical College
