= American Chinese =

American Chinese may refer to:

- Chinese Americans, US citizens or residents of Chinese origin or descent
  - American-born Chinese, a subset of the above category
  - American Chinese cuisine, Chinese cuisine developed by Chinese immigrants to the US
- Americans in China, especially those who participated in the building of Communism, such as:
- Chinese language in the United States

== See also ==
- American-born Chinese (disambiguation)
- (213)
- (6)
- (36)
- (12)
