= Shanghai Livingston American School =

- 上海李文斯顿美国学校

Location
- No.580, GanXi Rd. Changning District, Shanghai, 200336; China
- Coordinates: 31.211893°N 121.356879°E

Information
- Established: 2001
- Mascot: Wildcat
- Newspaper: "SLAS Times"
- Website: http://www.laschina.org/

Shanghai Livingston American School (Chinese: 上海李文斯顿美国学校) is a private school in Shanghai, China. Shanghai Livingston American School actively participates in Shanghai inter-school activities such as, but not limited to, Shanghai International School Activities Conference (SISAC), Math Olympiads, World Math Championship (WMC), and Model United Nations (MUN).

== See also ==
- Americans in China
