= Changchun American International School =

School in Changchun, Jilin, China

Coordinates: 43.85057°N 125.38768°E

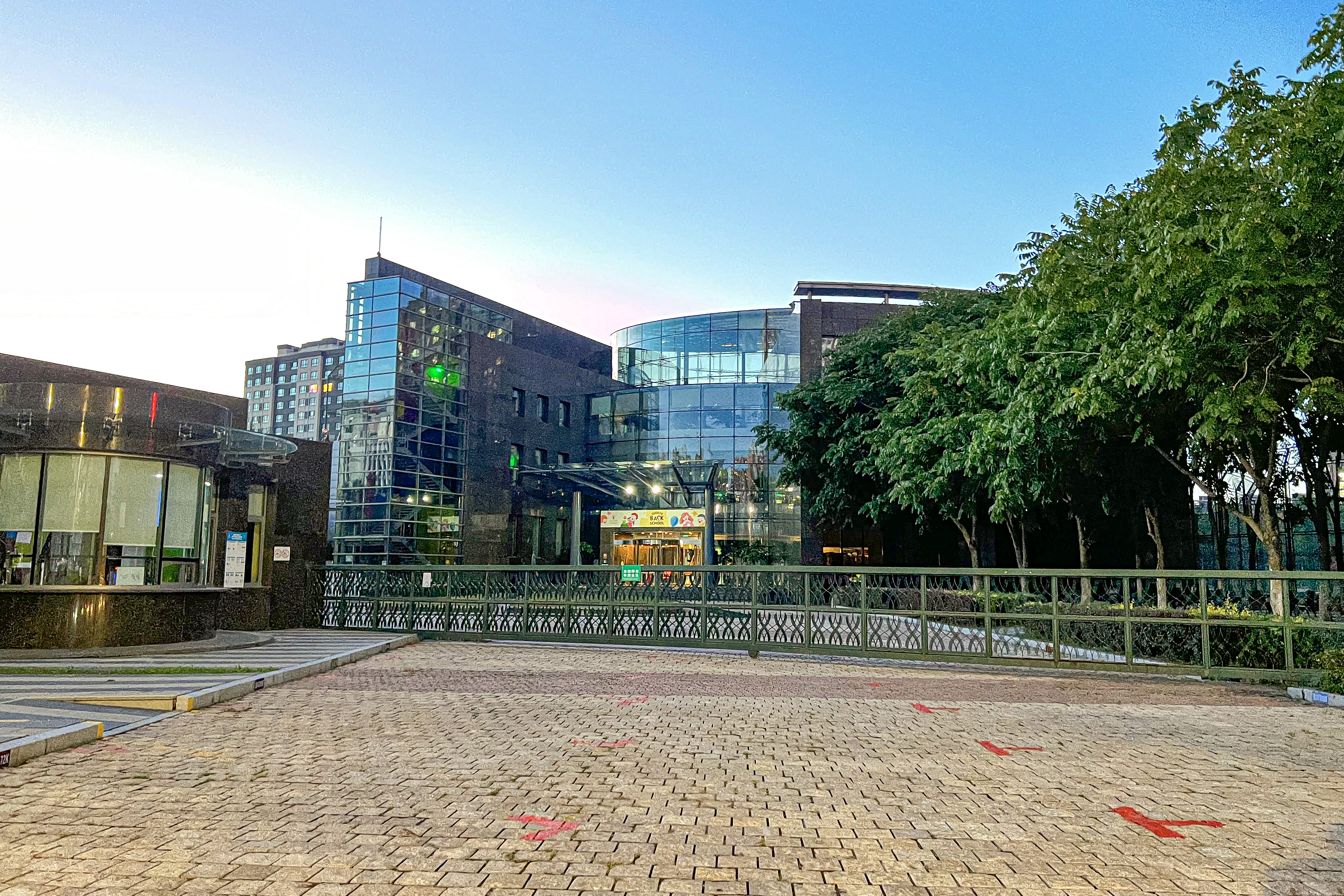
- Changchun, Jilin; China

Information
- Type: International school
- Established: 2006; 20 years ago
- Age: 3 to 19
- Website: www.caischina.org

Changchun American International School (Chinese: 长春美国国际学校, romanized: Zhǎngchūn měiguó guójì xuéxiào) is a private school for children of foreign personnel in Changchun, Jilin, China. It opened in 2006 and is (as of 2019) a certified IB school and accedited by the Council of International Schools.

Serving ages 3–19, it was the first international school to be established in the province.

== See also ==
- Americans in China
