= Tianjin University of Traditional Chinese Medicine First Affiliated Hospital =

Hospital in Tianjin, China

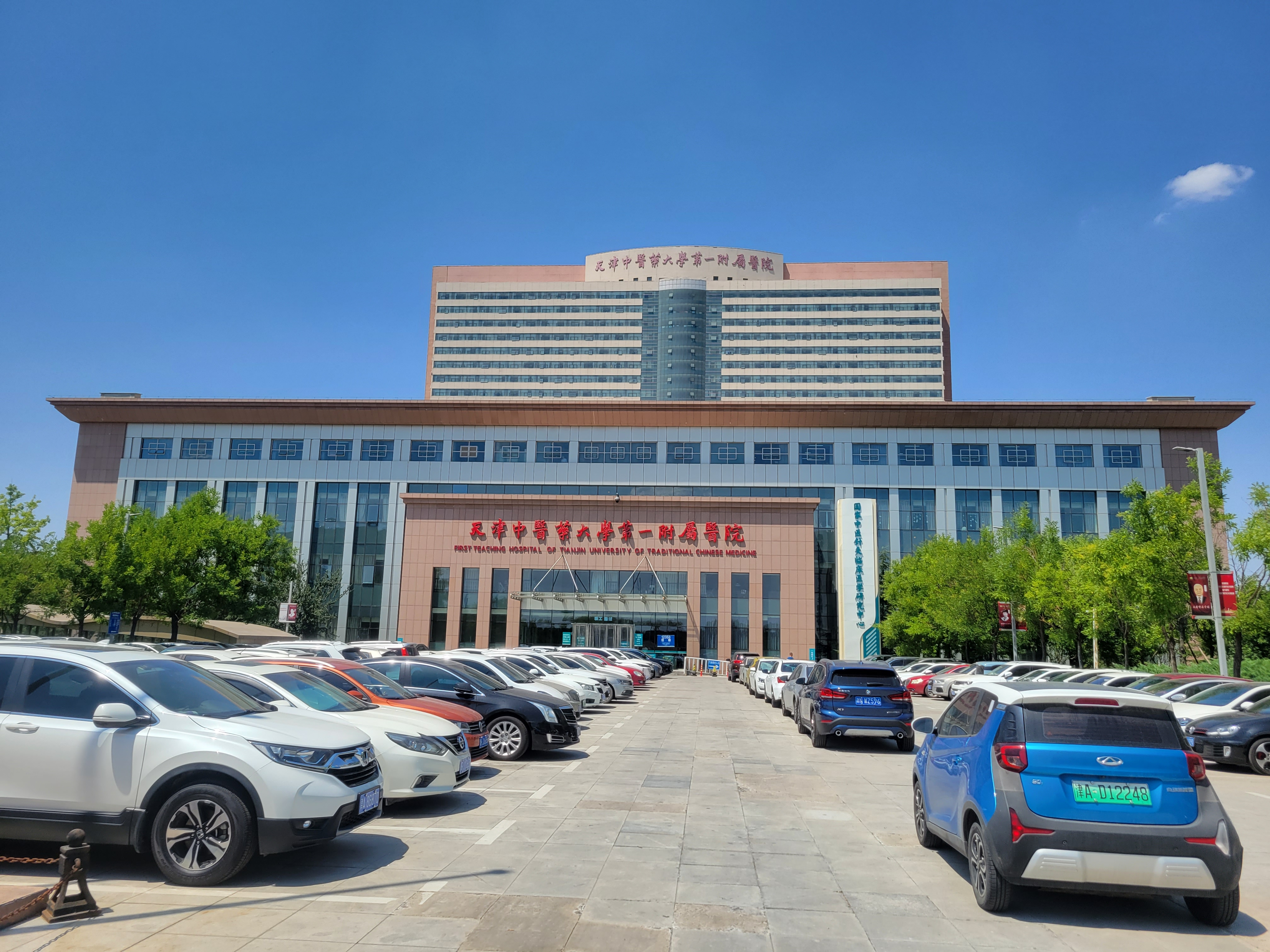
Tianjin University of Traditional Chinese Medicine First Affiliated Hospital

Tianjin University of Traditional Chinese Medicine First Affiliated Hospital, also known as The First Teaching Hospital of Tianjin University of Traditional Chinese Medicine and the National Clinical Research Center for Acupuncture and Moxibustion, is commonly referred to as Tianjin First Affiliated TCM Hospital or First Affiliated TCM Hospital. It was established on December 18, 1955. The North Campus is located at No. 314 Anshan West Road, Nankai District, Tianjin, and the South Campus is located at No. 88 Changling Road, Liqizhuang Street, Xiqing District.

== History ==
The predecessor of the Tianjin University of Traditional Chinese Medicine First Affiliated Hospital was the Tianjin Municipal TCM Hospital, established on December 18, 1955, in Heping District on Duolun Road, based on the personnel of the TCM Outpatient Department of Jian She Road, Tianjin. Guo Moruo inscribed the hospital's name. In 1958, the Tianjin College of Traditional Chinese Medicine was established, and the hospital was renamed the Affiliated Hospital of Tianjin College of Traditional Chinese Medicine. In 1966, the Tianjin College of Traditional Chinese Medicine relocated to Shijiazhuang, Hebei Province, and the hospital remained in Tianjin, becoming affiliated with the Tianjin Municipal Health Bureau and was renamed the Tianjin Municipal TCM Hospital. In 1978, the State Council approved the reconstruction of the Tianjin College of Traditional Chinese Medicine in Tianjin, and the hospital was renamed the First Affiliated Hospital of Tianjin College of Traditional Chinese Medicine. In 1991, it moved to its new location on Anshan West Road in Nankai District.In 2006, following the renaming of Tianjin College of Traditional Chinese Medicine to Tianjin University of Traditional Chinese Medicine, the hospital was renamed the First Affiliated Hospital of Tianjin University of Traditional Chinese Medicine.

== See also ==
- Tianjin University of Traditional Chinese Medicine
