= Embassy of the United States, Beijing =

United States diplomatic mission to the People's Republic of China

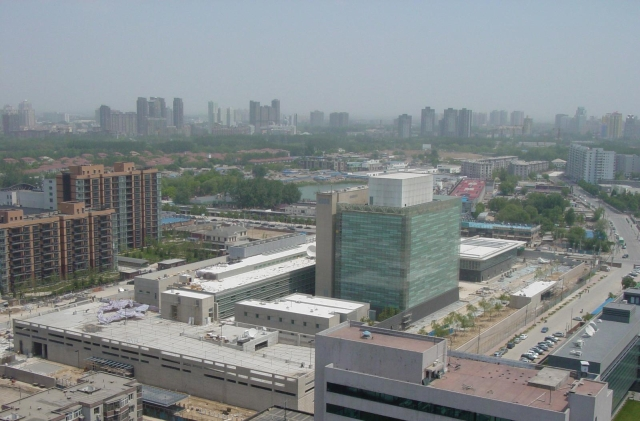
- Embassy as seen from above
- Location: Beijing, China
- Address: 55 Anjialou Road, Chaoyang, Beijing
- Coordinates: 39.95344161626216°N 116.4602207102872°E
- Ambassador: David Perdue
- Jurisdiction: China
- Website: Official website

The Embassy of the United States in Beijing (Chinese: 美国驻华大使馆; pinyin: Měiguó Zhù Huá Dàshǐ Guǎn) is the diplomatic mission of the United States in the People's Republic of China. It serves as the administrative office of the United States Ambassador to China. The embassy complex is in Chaoyang, Beijing.

In addition to Beijing, it covers the municipalities of Tianjin and Chongqing, the provinces of Gansu, Guizhou, Hebei, Henan, Hubei, Hunan, Jiangxi, Qinghai, Shanxi, Shaanxi, Shandong, Sichuan, and Yunnan, and autonomous regions of Guangxi, Inner Mongolia, Ningxia, Tibet and Xinjiang.

== History ==
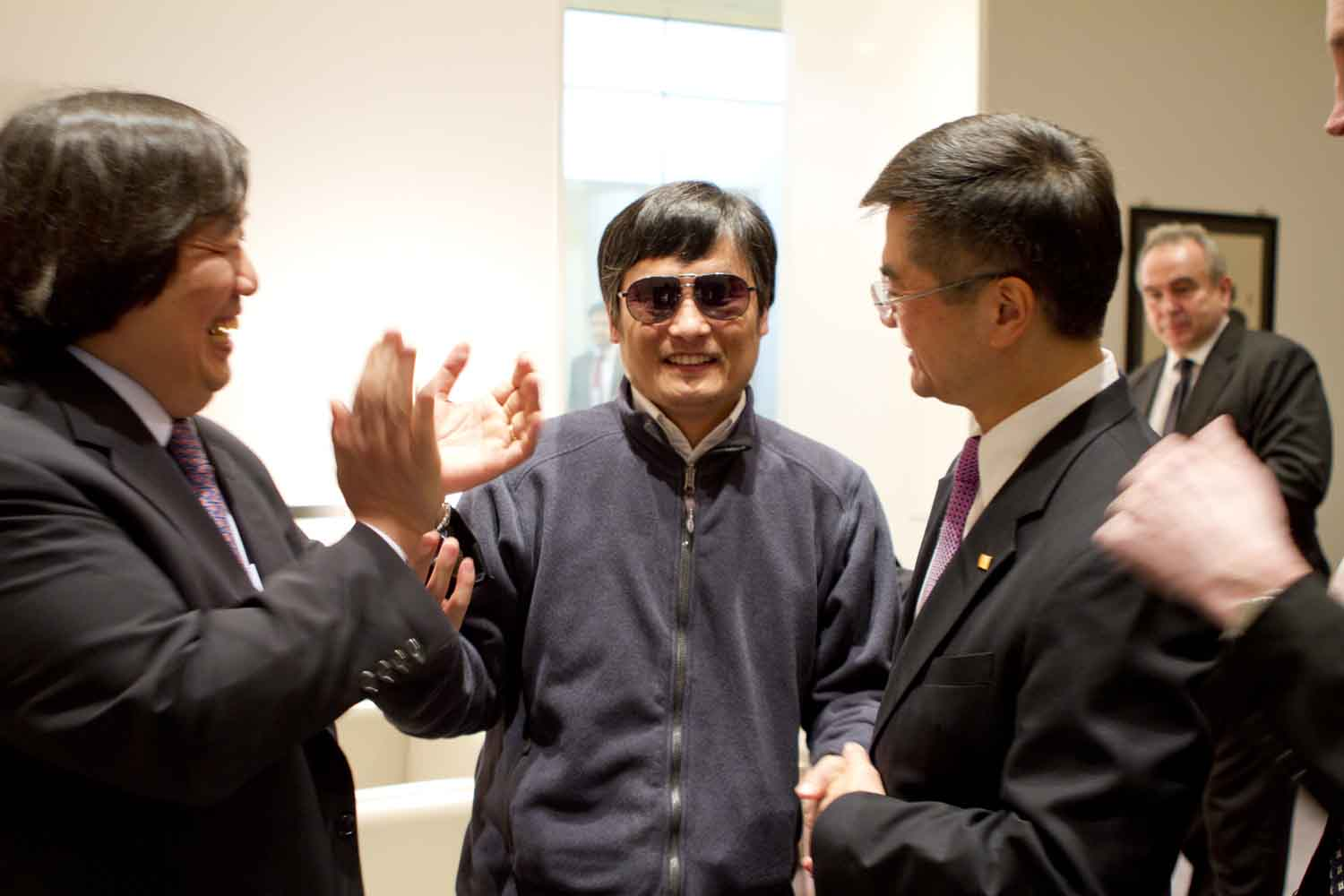
Photograph taken inside the U.S. Embassy in Beijing of Ambassador Gary Locke with Chen Guangcheng

The current U.S. Embassy in Beijing was opened and dedicated on August 8, 2008, by U.S. President George W. Bush and is the third largest American diplomatic mission in the world, after the Embassy of the United States, Baghdad and the Embassy of the United States, Yerevan. The U.S. embassy had its origins in 1935 when the legation was upgraded into the embassy in Nanjing. However, the central government of the nationalists was relocated to Taipei in 1949 due to the Chinese Civil War and the embassy was reopened in 1953. On January 1, 1979, the embassy was transferred to Beijing after normalizing relations with the communist government on the mainland.

The 500,000-square-foot (46,000 m^{2}), eight story facility incorporates a great deal of free-standing transparent and opaque glass in its design. It is located on a 10-acre (4.0 ha) plot of land. The embassy warehouse is located in the Beijing Tianzhu Airport Industrial Zone in Shunyi District.

Since the embassy is legally out of reach of the Government of China, it was used as the hiding place of Chinese dissident Chen Guangcheng after he escaped from house arrest.

== Principal officers ==
=== Deputy Chiefs of Mission (DCM) ===
Name	Portrait	Start of term	End of term
J. Stapleton Roy		1979	1981
Chas W. Freeman, Jr.		1981	1984
Herbert E. Horowitz		1984	1986
Peter Tomsen		1986	1989
Raymond Burghardt (acting)		1989	1989
B. Lynn Pascoe		1989	1992 (Note: State Department records for foreign service list indicates that Deputy Chief of Mission in Beijing changed from B. Lynn Pascoe to Scott S. Hallford between Spring 1992 and Fall 1992.)
Scott S. Hallford		1992	1996
William C. McCahill, Jr.		1996	1999
G. Eugene Martin		1999	2000
Michael W. Marine		September 2000	June 2004
David S. Sedney		2004	2007
Dan Piccuta		May 2007	January 2009
William Weinstein (Acting)		January 2009	July 2009
Robert Goldberg		July 2009	2011
Robert S. Wang		January 2011	August 2013
Daniel Kritenbrink		July 2013	2015
David H. Rank		January 2016	January 2017
Julie L. Kavanagh (Acting)		January 2017	June 2017
Jonathan Fritz (Acting)		June 2017	2018
Robert W. Forden		July 2018	October 2020
William Klein (Acting)		October 2020	October 2021
Bobby Richey (Acting)		October 2021	
Gregory May		July 2025	

== See also ==
- List of diplomatic missions of the United States
- United States Ambassador to China
- U.S. Consulate General Chengdu
- U.S. Consulate General Guangzhou
- U.S. Consulate General Shanghai
- U.S. Consulate General Shenyang
- U.S. Consulate General Wuhan
- Consulate General of the United States, Hong Kong and Macau
- Embassy of People's Republic of China in Washington, D.C.
- International School of Beijing
- Americans in China
