= QSI International School of Chengdu =

American school in Chengdu, Sichuan, China

- 成都美国学校

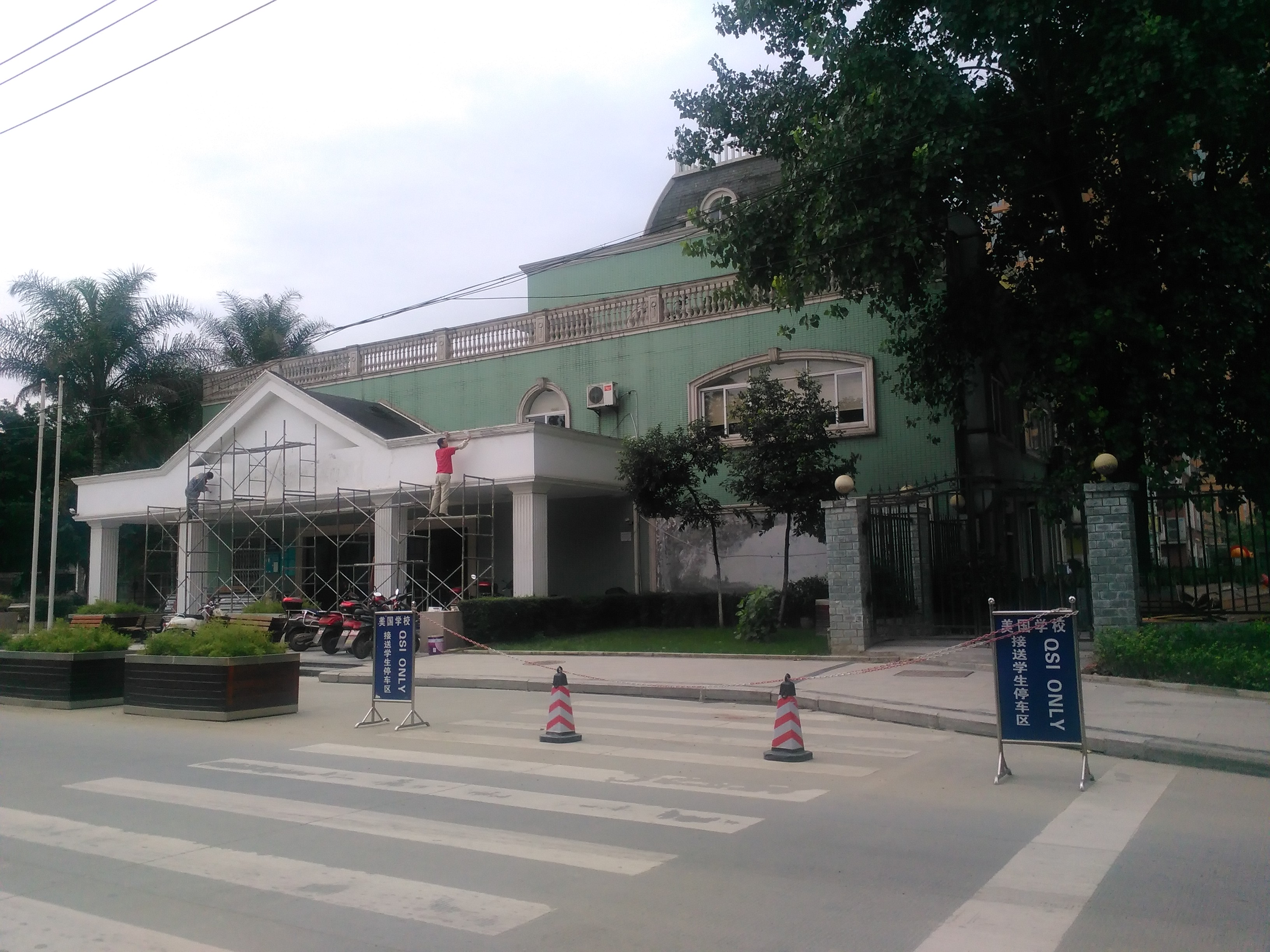

Location
- 188 South 3rd Ring Road (Nan 3 Duan), American Garden; Chengdu, Sichuan, 610041; China
- Coordinates: 30.59625°N 104.08839°E

Information
- Type: Private international school
- Motto: Success for All
- Established: 2002
- Founders: James Gilson; Duane Root
- Director: Clare McDermott
- Grades: Preschool to Secondary
- Age range: 3-18
- Language: English
- Colors: Red and Black
- Mascot: Red Eagles
- Accreditation: Middle States Association of Colleges and Schools
- Newspaper: Hao Xiao Xi
- Website: www.qsi.org/china/cdu

QSI International School of Chengdu
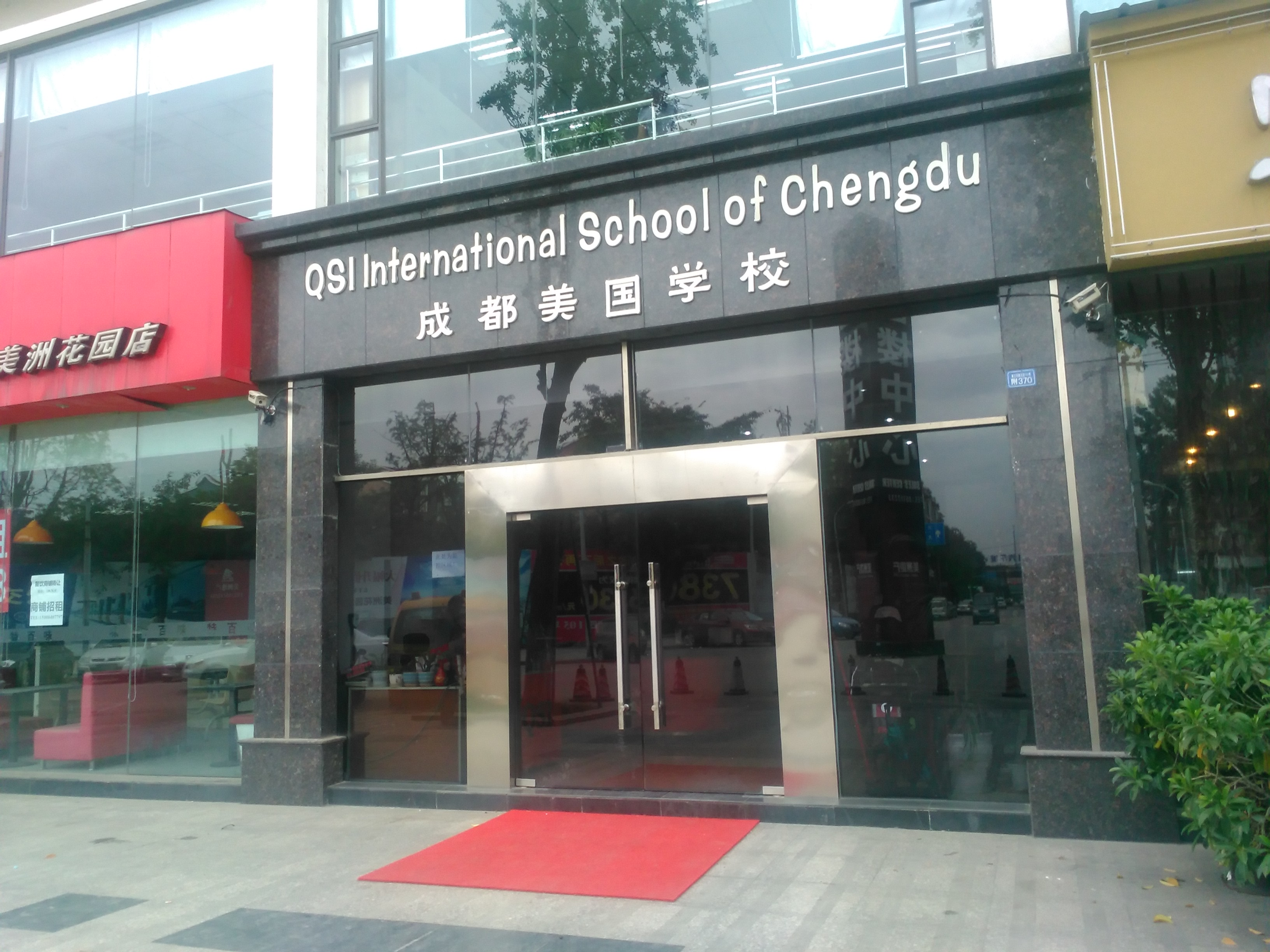
- Office
- Simplified Chinese: 成都美国学校
- Traditional Chinese: 成都美國學校
- Literal meaning: Chengdu American School
Transcriptions
Standard Mandarin
- Hanyu Pinyin: Chéngdū Měiguó Xuéxiào

QSI International School of Chengdu (成都美国学校) is a private for-profit international school in Chengdu, Sichuan, China. The school, using a U.S.-based curriculum, resides in two buildings.
