= The Garden Hotel, Guangzhou =

Hotel in Guangzhou, Guangdong, China

LN Garden Hotel
- Exterior view of the hotel

- Location within Guangdong The Garden Hotel, Guangzhou (China)

General information
- Location: 368 Huanshi Dong Lu, Guangzhou, China
- Coordinates: 23°8′17.5″N 113°16′51.0″E
- Opening: August 28, 1985
- Owner: Guangzhou Lingnan International Enterprise Group Co., Ltd.
- Operator: Guangzhou Lingnan International Enterprise Group Co., Ltd.

Technical details
- Floor count: 30

Design and construction
- Architects: Guangzhou Pearl River Foreign Investment & Construction Company

Other information
- Number of rooms: 828
- Number of suites: 42

Website
- www.thegardenhotel.com.cn

LN Garden Hotel or The Garden Hotel is currently ranked as a 5-star hotel in Guangzhou, and was the Headquarters Hotel of the 16th Asian Games. It is located in the Yuexiu District.

The Garden Hotel consists of two buildings: Hotel Tower and Garden Tower. Its site is 48,000m², with 20,000m² of gardens. The logo for the hotel is a kapok, the city flower of Guangzhou.

The Embassy of Japan in Guangzhou is located on the first floor of the hotel.

== Overview ==
The Garden Hotel contains 828 guest rooms and suites, 151 apartments, 8 multi-function rooms, a ballroom and 9 dining rooms. The Health Club and spa are located in the Roof Garden on the 4th Floor. The recreational facilities of the hotel include an outdoor swimming pool, gym, steam room, sauna room, tennis courts and squash courts. The hotel also has a business centre, shopping arcade and parking.

Decorated in both Chinese and Western styles, the hotel lobby's design aims to replicate an ancient palace with curated murals and marble.

The back garden features a waterfall, rockery, fresco, and pavilion.

== Timeline ==
Date	Events
2008-12-30	The Garden Hotel became the Headquarters Hotel of The 16th Guangzhou Asian Games.
2007-08-18	The Garden Hotel was awarded the title of “Platinum Five-Star Hotel” by the China National Tourism Administration.
2005-01-01	The property right of The Garden Hotel was returned to the Guangzhou Municipal Government and then the Hotel became a member of Guangzhou Lingnan International Enterprise Group Co., Ltd.
1990-07-16	The Garden Hotel was honored as China’s “Five-Star Hotel” by the China National Tourism Administration.
1985-08-28	The Garden Hotel was officially opened.
1984-02-02	The Garden Hotel’s tablet was inscribed by the former Chinese leader Deng Xiaoping.
1980-12-26	The Garden Hotel celebrated its grand foundation laid by the former Chinese President Yang Shangkun.
	The Garden Hotel was sketchily designed by Mr. Ieoh Ming Pei

== Awards ==
Date	Awards
2010-05-11	“China Hotel Golden Star Award” conferred by China Tourist Hotels Association
2010-04-08	“Best Business Hotel in Guangzhou” by TTG China
2010-03-18	“Top 10 Glamorous Hotels of China” in the China Hotel Starlight Awards
2008-03-07	“Top Ten Most Attractive Hotels in China”, “Best Employer of China Hotel Industry” in the China Hotel Starlight Awards
2007-10-21	“National Brand Award” in the Platinum Awards of International Hotel Forum Organization
2007-06-15	“Top Ten Famous Brand Hotels in Asia” in the Global Hotel Five Star Golden Diamond Awards of Global Hotel Forum
2005-11-19	“Top Ten Most Popular Hotels in China” in the Platinum Awards of International Hotel Forum Organization
2005-04-18	“Top Ten Popular Business Hotels in China” in the China Hotel Golden Pillow Awards
2004-09-24	“Best Business Hotel in Guangzhou” awarded by Business Traveller Asia-Pacific

== Celebrities ==
The Garden Hotel has hosted many VIPs, including:

- King Carl XVI Gustaf of Sweden
- H.H. Ahmed Al-Fahad Al-Ahmed Al-Sabah, President of the Olympic Council of Asia
- Mr. Ludwig Scotty, former President of Nauru
- H.E. Mr. Abhisit Vejjajiva, Prime Minister of Thailand
- Mr. Valéry Giscard d'Estaing, former President of France
- Mr. Edward Heath, former Prime Minister of the United Kingdom
- Mr. Pierre Trudeau, former Prime Minister of Canada
- Mr. Bob Hawke, former Prime Minister of Australia
- Mr. Toshiki Kaifu, former Prime Minister of Japan
- Mr. Lee Kuan Yew, Minister Mentor and former Prime Minister of Singapore
- Ms. Margaret Beckett, M.P., former Secretary of State for Foreign and Commonwealth Affairs of the United Kingdom
- Russian singer Vitas
