= Second Affiliated Hospital and Yuying Children's Hospital of Wenzhou Medical University =

Geography
- Location: Wenzhou, Zhejiang, China
- Coordinates: 28.0062°N 120.6722°E

Organisation
- Type: Teaching
- Affiliated university: Wenzhou Medical College

Services
- Standards: Grade 3, Class A
- Beds: 1620

History
- Former name: Bethune Clinic of Wnezhou Medical College
- Founded: 1976

Links
- Website: wzhealth.com
- Lists: Hospitals in China
- Other links: Wenzhou Medical College, IMS

The Second Affiliated Hospital and Yuying Children's Hospital of Wenzhou Medical University (Chinese: 温州医科大学附属第二医院｜育英儿童医院) is a public hospital affiliated with Wenzhou Medical University in Wenzhou, Zhejiang, China.

== History ==
- 1976: The hospital started out as the "Bethune Clinic" of Wenzhou Medical College.
- 1982: It was authorized to change its name to the 2nd Affiliated Hospital of Wenzhou Medical College by the Health Department of the Zhejiang provincial government.
- 1988: Yuying Children's Hospital was appended to its title.
- 1991: (August) - With the help of a generous 15 million HK dollars donation from He Chaoyu (a Taiwanese native), a children's hospital building - spanning 9045 square metres and complete with 300 beds - was built; it was subsequently named the Yuying Children's Hospital of Wenzhou Medical College.
- 2004: The hospital was also granted the name "Zhejiang Provincial Yuying Hospital" by the Health Department of the Zhejiang provincial government.
- 2005: (August) - The Wenzhou Cardiology Hospital was purchased and became the Nanpu Branch Hospital, adding a further 36,996 square metres and 420 beds to the hospital.

== Current status ==
Currently, the hospital covers 42,368 square metres, has a combined 1,620 bed capacity, and has had more than 1.50 million out-patient visits and 40,715 in-patient admissions since 2005. The hospital employs 2,466 staff members, 256 of whom are of senior rank (65 professors, 191 vice-professors), 381 of middle rank titles, 21 with PhDs and 217 with Master's Degrees.

It now has 35 disease sections, 41 clinical departments, more than 60 specialized clinics, 15 research institutes and 8 medical centers, which include:

- Zhejiang Provincial Pediatric Respiratory Disease Diagnosis and Treatment Center
- Zhejiang Provincial Spine Surgery Center
- Wenzhou Poliomyelitis Correction and Treatment Center
- Wenzhou Anesthesia Quality Control Center
- Wenzhou Colo-proctological Disease Treatment Center (TCM & Western Medicine Combined)
- Wenzhou First-aid Center for Traffic Accidents
- Orthopedic Treatment and Research Center of Wenzhou Medical College
- National Acupuncture and Moxibustion Research Center Wenzhou Branch.

In addition to having comprehensive clinical departments, the hospital has 6 key departments and 3 key specialities at the provincial level: Pediatric Respiratory Department and Orthopedic Department (spine and microsurgery) are two provincial key departments, Anesthesiology Department and Pediatric Nephrology (TCM & Western Medicine Combined) are provincial key supportive departments, Perinatal Department & Colo-proctology Department (TCM & Western Medicine Combined) are provincial key constructive departments. Provincial key TCM specialities include cervical & lumbar diseases, cerebrovascular disease (TCM & Western Medicine Combined) and pediatric anorexia.

As a teaching hospital, the 2nd Affiliated hospital typically oversees the training of 2,557 medical students; each year, the hospital provides practicing opportunities for 120 doctors from other hospitals and over 470 interns from Wenzhou Medical College, Wenzhou Nursing School and other medical schools. The hospital also collaborates with other medical universities, both in China and abroad, through scholarly exchanges.
