= Practical Chinese Reader =

Chinese textbook series

- Original title: shíyòng hànyǔ kèběn (实用汉语课本)
- Language: Chinese/various
- Genre: Language textbook
- Published: Beijing
- Publisher: Shangwu Yinshuguan (The Commercial Press)
- Publication date: 1981
- Publication place: China
- Pages: 551 (Book I), 506 (Book II), 393 (Book III), 381 (Book IV)
- ISBN: 7100000882 (book I), 7100000890 (book II)

The Practical Chinese Reader (Chinese: 实用汉语课本; pinyin: shíyòng hànyǔ kèběn) is a six-volume series of Chinese language teaching books developed to teach non-Chinese speakers to speak Chinese, first published in 1981.

Books I and II consist of 50 lessons where the reader studies a vocabulary of 1,000 words, and basic Chinese phonology and grammar. The lessons tell the story of two foreign students of Chinese, Palanka and Gubo, first in their own country (Book I) and then in China (Book II). They give priority to everyday topics that Gubo and Palanka encounter (e.g. clothing, entertainment, socializing), and also provide background information on Chinese culture, society, and history.

Books III and IV consist of 30 lessons with a vocabulary of about 2,000 words. Each lesson focuses on a wide range of topics such as history, education, economy, medicine, sports, literature and art, newspapers and broadcasting, marriage and family life, scenic spots and historical sites, etc. Books III and IV follow the same format as Books I and II and continue to follow Gubo and Palanka. Starting in Book IV, grammar explanations are no longer provided in English.

Books V and VI consist of 30 lessons with more than 3,000 words and everyday expressions. The foreign students of Chinese, Palanka, and Gubo, are no longer included in Books V and VI. Book V contains original essays and works on a wide range of themes and affairs in China. Each work varies in form, style, and length. Book VI contains excerpts from longer literary works. Both books give a brief introduction on the author, background, and explanatory notes are provided at the end of the text if necessary. English is not used at all. Even the new words are explained in basic Chinese.

The Practical Chinese Reader was the first set of dedicated textbooks on basic Chinese for use by foreign students of Chinese sponsored by the Chinese Ministry of Education, who commissioned three professors at Beijing Languages Institute (now Beijing Language and Culture University) to write it in the 1970s. It was praised by American and German academics in the early 1980s as practical and advanced. It also received a warm domestic welcome for its "meticulously planned" educational content and innovation in "using the communicative principle and strengthening cultural knowledge education", and won the second prize inaugural Beijing Philosophy and Social Sciences Award for Excellence.

== New Practical Chinese Reader ==
Practical Chinese Reader was completely revised in 2002 and was re-published as New Practical Chinese Reader. New teaching material and concepts were added, while older words not in common use were removed. The new series consists of six volumes: The first four target beginners, while the last two are geared for intermediate learners. The New Practical Chinese Reader pays homage to the older edition by introducing a new character, Libo, who is the son of Gubo and Ding Yun from the original edition.

Page two of the NPCR reads:

A Canadian Student, aged 21, male Gubo is his father Ding Yun is his mother.

Versions in English (Simplified Chinese or Traditional Chinese), Spanish, German, French, and Russian are available. Other versions are in the process of publication.

== The characters ==
- Gubo (古波; gǔbō): Young male student, non-Chinese. The name's transliteration is uncertain, but Cooper or Gilbert has been suggested. According to one of the authors of the original PCR, there was no corresponding name, he simply coined the name because it sounded foreign.
- Palanka (帕兰卡; pàlánkǎ): Young female student, non-Chinese, Gubo's friend. Chosen as a Western-sounding name, the original being possibly Bianca
- Ding Yun (丁云; dīng yún): Young female student, Chinese, Palanka's friend.
- Ding Libo (丁力波; dīng lìbō): Son of Gubo and Ding Yun, Ma Dawei's friend. Introduced in the NPCR.
- Ma Dawei (马大为; mǎ dàwéi): An American male student, whose English name is David March, Ding Libo's friend. Introduced in "NPCR".
- Lin Na (林娜; lín nà): A British female student, whose English name is Natalie Lynn. Introduced in "NPCR".
- Wang Xiaoyun (王小云; wáng xiǎoyún): A Chinese female student. Introduced in "NPCR".
- Song Hua (宋华; sòng huá): A Chinese male student. Introduced in "NPCR".
- Lu Yuping (陆雨平; lù yǔpíng): A Chinese male reporter. Introduced in "NPCR".

To keep the dialogue the same, the characters are given universal names in translations of the book across all languages.
