= First Affiliated Hospital of Wenzhou Medical University =

The First Affiliated Hospital of Wenzhou Medical University

Geography
- Location: Wenzhou, Zhejiang, China
- Coordinates: 27.9388°N 120.6962°E

Organisation
- Type: Teaching
- Affiliated university: Wenzhou Medical College

Services
- Standards: Grade 3, Class A

History
- Founded: 1919

Links
- Website: wzhospital.com (in Chinese)
- Lists: Hospitals in China
- Other links: Wenzhou Medical College, IMS

The First Affiliated Hospital of Wenzhou Medical University (Chinese: 温州医科大学附属第一医院) is a grade 3A hospital located in Wenzhou, Zhejiang, China. It is also recognised as the First Provincial Wenzhou Hospital of Zhejiang (Chinese: 浙江省立温州第一医院; pinyin: Zhèjiāng shěnglì Wēnzhōu dìyī yīyuàn).

== History ==
Founded in 1919, it was originally known as the Ouhai Hospital. Almost a century later, it has been transformed into a renowned health center that is now charged with providing critical medical care service to the Southern Zhejiang-Fujian region with a population exceeding 20 million. As of 2010, it has logged an impressive 2.197 million outpatient and emergency visits, 51,000 hospital visits, and 27,000 surgeries.

In the 1990s, Taiwanese national He Chaoyu and his wife, Huang Meiying, donated money that went towards the construction of the Yuying Out-Patient Building and the Yuying Inpatient Building, thus augmenting the hospital's development.

== Current status ==
The hospital employs 4,425 workers, consisting of 193 senior professors, 309 associate professors, 15 PhDs and 156 master's degree instructors. Its current bed capacity of 3,000 is complemented by 56 treatment centers and clinical departments, 10 medical departments, a medical institution, a surgical center and a medical experiment center.

The hospital consists of the following treatment hubs:

- City Branch
- The Medical Care Center (保健中心)
- The No. 8 Hospital
- Chashan Branch {in the final phase of construction}
