= New England College of Optometry =

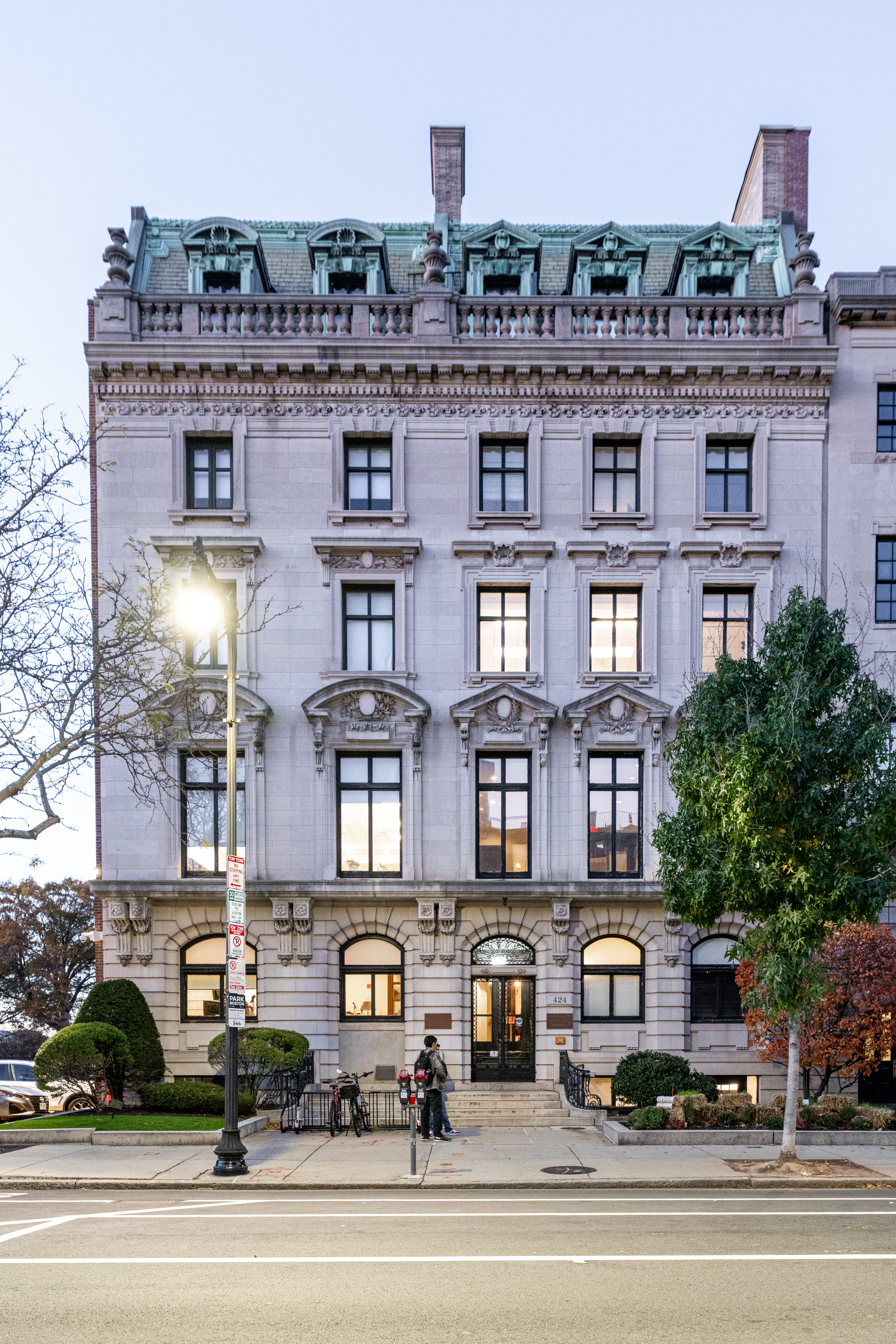
- Type: Private optometry college
- Established: 1894
- President: Howard Purcell
- Location: Boston, Massachusetts, United States; 42.3518°N 71.0868°W
- Website: www.neco.edu

The New England College of Optometry is a private optometry college in Boston, Massachusetts. It enrolls over 500 students and is one of the oldest continually operating colleges of optometry in the United States.

== History ==
It was originally established as the Klein School of Optics in 1894 by ophthalmologist August Andreas Klein. The college moved to several locations around Boston, and was known as the Massachusetts School of Optometry and the Massachusetts College of Optometry until it came to reside in its current location in the Back Bay section of Boston.

The college offers both Doctor of Optometry (O.D.) and Master of Science in Vision Science degrees. Special emphasis is placed on direct contact with patients, and to this end students make use of the College's owned and operated clinics, NECO Center for Eye Care Commonwealth and Roslindale, as well as the NECO Clinical Network of eye care centers.
