= Wenzhou Medical University =

Medical school in Wenzhou, China

- 温州医科大学
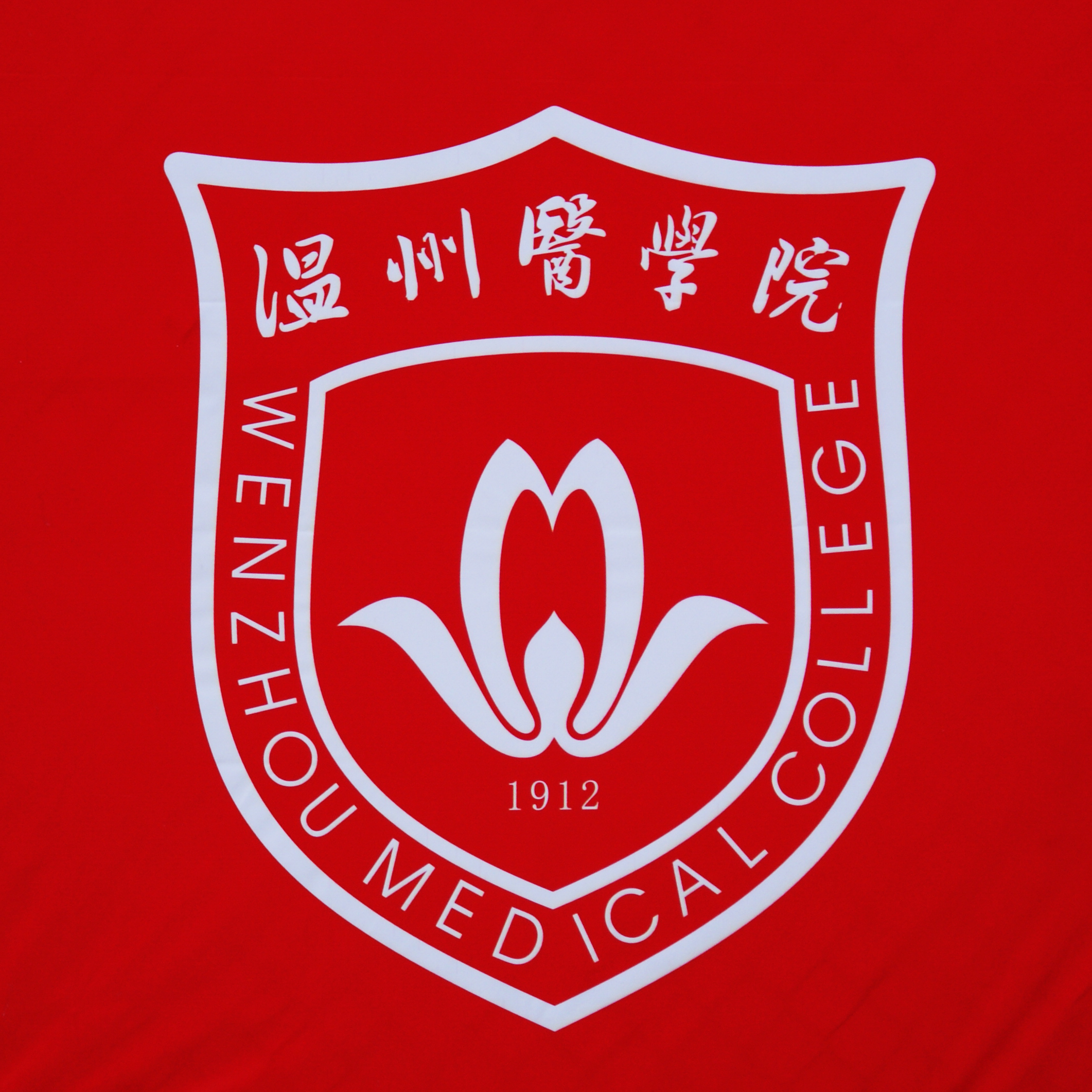
- Motto: 仁肃勤朴 求是奋发 (pinyin: fènfā qiúshí)
- Type: Public
- Established: 1912; 114 years ago
- President: Li Xiaokun
- Faculty: 1,000 (Medical)
- Administrative staff: 10,112 (Including hospitals)
- Undergraduates: 19,314
- Postgraduates: 3,102
- Location: Wenzhou, Zhejiang, People's Republic of China
- Campus: Suburban, 1.27 km^{2}
- Website: en.wmu.edu.cn

Wenzhou Medical University (WMU; Chinese: 温州医科大学; pinyin: Wēnzhōu Yīkē Dàxué) is a provincial public university in Wenzhou, Zhejiang, China.

== Organization ==
=== Schools and departments ===
15 Schools

- School of Stomatology
- School of Basic Medical Sciences
- School of the 1st Clinical Medical Sciences, School of Information and Engineering
- School of the 2nd Clinical Medical Sciences
- School of Ophthalmology and Optometry, School of Biomedical Engineering
- School of Laboratory Science and Life Science
- School of Pharmaceutical Sciences
- School of Nursing
- School of Public Health and Management
- School of Marxism
- School of Sports Science
- School of Foreign Language Studies
- School of International Studies
- School of Mental Health
- School of innovation and Entrepreneurship Education

=== Affiliated hospitals ===
- First Affiliated Hospital of Wenzhou Medical University
- Second Affiliated Hospital and Yuying Children's Hospital of Wenzhou Medical University
- Eye Hospital of Wenzhou Medical University
- Dental Hospital of Wenzhou Medical University

== Rankings ==
In 2021, Academic Ranking of World Universities ranked Wenzhou Medical University within the 501-600 band globally.

University rankings

Global – Overall
- ARWU World: 501-600 (2021)

== See also ==
- List of universities in China
- Special Olympics
- Avicenna Directories
