= 1999 anti-US protests in China =

- Part of protest and dissent in China, anti-American sentiment in China
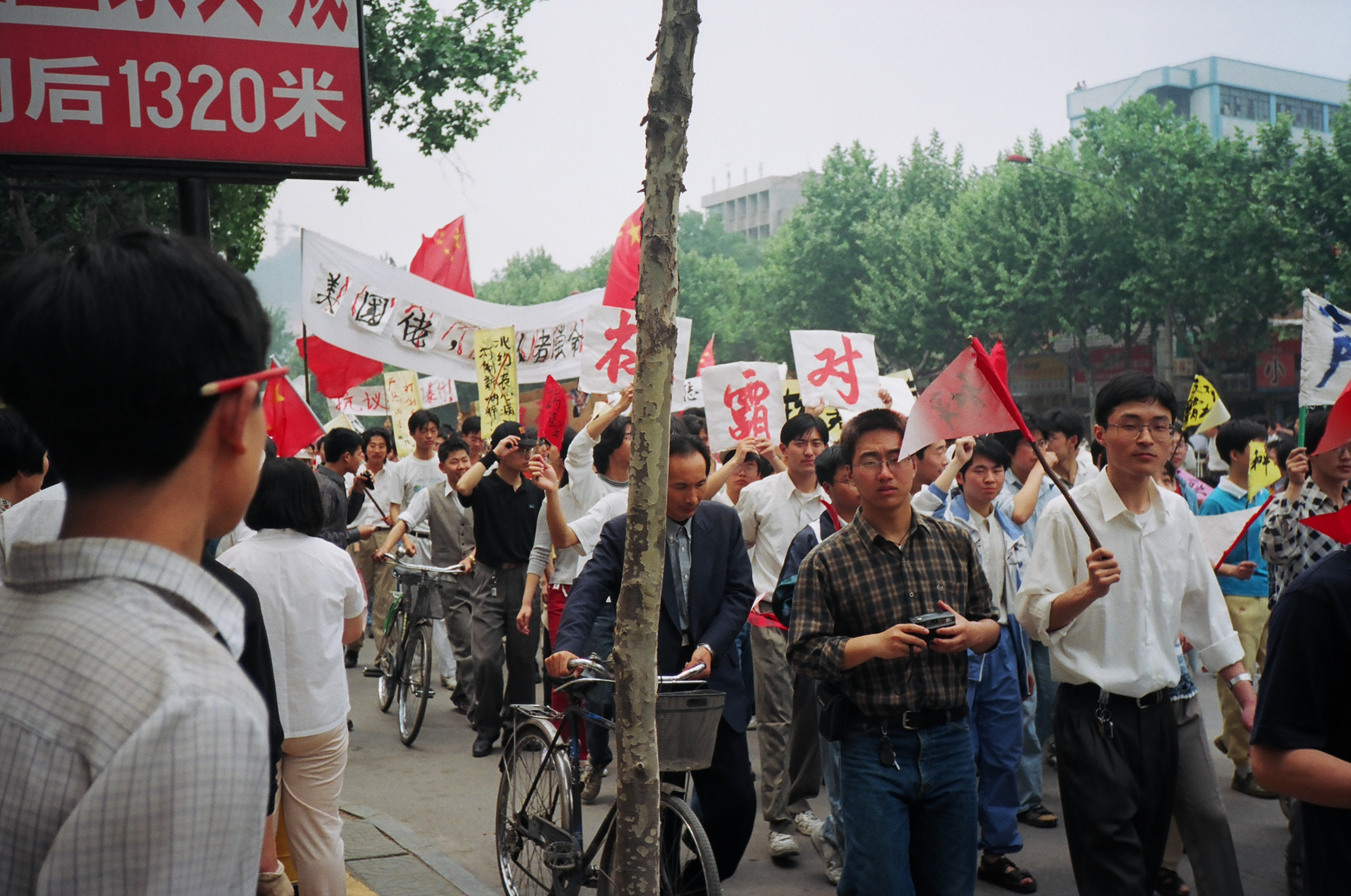
- Anti-American protests in Nanjing following the US bombing of the Chinese embassy in Belgrade, 1999.
- Date: 8 May 1999 – 11 May 1999; smaller protests continued after
- Location: China, Portuguese Macau, smaller protests across Asia and worldwide
- Caused by: United States bombing of the Chinese embassy in Belgrade
- Methods: peaceful protest, attacks on diplomatic missions, boycott
- Result: China compensates the US with US$2,870,000 for consular damages, while the US compensates China US$28,000,000 for the bombing, in addition to US$4,500,000 for the victims.
- Concessions: US President Bill Clinton apologizes on 10 May

Casualties
- Death: 0
- Damage: Consulate General of the United States, Chengdu damaged by fire

From 8 May to 10 May 1999, anti-US and anti-NATO protests swept across China and the Chinese diaspora around the world, in response to the United States bombing of the Chinese embassy in Belgrade. Overwhelmingly perceived as a deliberate attack, crowds tens of thousands strong, led by students, demonstrated outside US and NATO embassies and consulates in major cities. Many protesters were violent, attacking consular buildings by throwing rocks, destroying vehicles, and setting fires, although no serious injuries occurred. Large-scale protests forced the temporary closure of every US Embassy and Consulate General in China: Beijing, Shanghai, Guangzhou, Chengdu, and Shenyang. Further protests occurred in Shenzhen, Nanjing, Lanzhou, Hong Kong and the Portuguese territory of Macau. This represented the largest student protests in China since the 1989 Tiananmen Square protests and massacre, and remained the largest movement in Beijing until the 2005 anti-Japanese demonstrations. Globally, Chinese students and diaspora peacefully protested outside US embassies.

On 10 May, US President Bill Clinton publicly apologized for the bombing, also stating "I think it is very important to draw a clear distinction between a tragic mistake and a deliberate act of ethnic cleansing." In December, China agreed to compensate the US with US$2,870,000 for the demonstrations' damage to consular property, while the US compensated China with US$28,000,000 for the bombing.

== Protests in China ==
Large-scale protests forced the temporary closure of every US Embassy and Consulate Generals in China: Beijing, Shanghai, Guangzhou, Chengdu, and Shenyang. Further protests occurred in Shenzhen, Nanjing, Lanzhou, Hong Kong and the Portuguese territory of Macau. This represented the largest student protests in China since the 1989 Tiananmen Square protests and massacre, and remained the largest movement in Beijing until the 2005 anti-Japanese demonstrations.

Western media accused Chinese media of fuelling the protests, pointing to its initial lack of reporting on the US apologies and claims of unintentionality, and rhetoric such as a People's Daily article saying NATO had intentionally "spilled Chinese blood".

The protests continued for several days, during which tens of thousands of rock-throwing protesters kept US Ambassador James Sasser and other staff trapped in the Beijing embassy. The residence of the US Consul in Chengdu was damaged by fire and protestors tried to burn the consulate in Guangzhou. There were no reported injuries. Besides the British and other NATO missions, the embassies of Albania and Ireland were also attacked.

On 9 May, then-Vice President Hu Jintao delivered a national televised speech calling the act both "criminal" and "barbaric" and that it "has greatly infuriated the Chinese people." He said the unauthorized demonstrations in Beijing, Shanghai, Guangzhou, Chengdu and Shenyang reflected the anger and patriotism of the Chinese people, and which the Chinese government fully supported, but urged against extreme and illegal conduct.

Some protesters were alarmed by the nature of the NATO bombing campaign, in the name of humanitarian intervention, without United Nations Security Council approval, fearing a similar attack against China, potentially over Taiwan or Tibet. One protester told the New York Post "We know what the U.S. intention is ... Today Kosovo, tomorrow Taiwan." Some rhetoric focused on US President Bill Clinton. One sign read "Clinton, we're not Monica", referencing the 1998 Clinton–Lewinsky scandal, while another read "Clinton the second Hitler". Others focused on anti-Americanism more broadly. One student slogan read "don't take TOEFL, don't take GRE, fight wholeheartedly the American Empire". In cities without a US consulate, such as Shenzhen, protests took place outside McDonald's and Wal-Mart locations.

== Protests outside China ==
Global protests were typically led by students. Outside of China, significant protests occurred outside the American Institute in Taiwan, including an arson attempt. In Phnom Penh, Cambodia, police fired rounds into the air when hundreds of Chinese Cambodians attempted to overrun a temporary barrier to the US embassy. Peaceful protests occurred outside US missions in Hong Kong, Seoul, Tokyo, Vientiane, Bangkok, Kuala Lumpur, Singapore, and Manila.

Outside of Asia, protests occurred at Chinese embassies in every major European city, as well as Tel Aviv, Jerusalem, Cairo, Pretoria, Dar es Salaam, Islamabad, Mumbai, and Kathmandu.

== Aftermath ==
On 10 May, US President Bill Clinton publicly apologized for the bombing, also stating "I think it is very important to draw a clear distinction between a tragic mistake and a deliberate act of ethnic cleansing." In August, the US agreed to compensate the victims of the bombing and their families. In December, the US agreed to compensate China for damage to the embassy, and China agreed to compensate the US for damage to consular property in the resulting demonstrations in China. China compensated the United States for US$2,870,000 (equivalent to $5,365,652 in 2025), while the US compensated the embassy damage with US$28,000,000 (equivalent to $52,347,826 in 2025), as well as a "voluntary humanitarian payment" to the victims' families of US$4,500,000 (equivalent to $8,413,043 in 2025).

== See also ==
- United States bombing of the Chinese embassy in Belgrade
- NATO bombing of Yugoslavia
- 1989 Tiananmen Square protests and massacre
- 2005 anti-Japanese demonstrations
- 2019–2020 Hong Kong protests
- China–United States relations
