= Unhappy =

Unhappy may refer to:

- an adjective denoting a person in a state of depression
- Unhappy consciousness, a philosophical concept popularized by Georg Wilhelm Friedrich Hegel
- Unhappy numbers, a mathematical concept
- Unhappy triad, a knee injury
- Unhappy Mac, a legacy Macintosh startup screen

== People ==
- "Unhappy Countess", an alternative name for Mary Bowes, Countess of Strathmore and Kinghorne

== Media ==
- "Unhappy Girl", a song by The Doors on their 1967 album Strange Days
- "Unhappy Birthday", a song by Dead or Alive on their 1990 album Fan the Flame (Part 1)
- "Unhappy", a song by Outkast on their 2003 album Speakerboxxx/The Love Below
- "Unhappy", a song by Lukas Graham on their 2018 album 3 (The Purple Album)
- Unhappy China, a 2009 book by Song Qiang, Huang Jisu, Song Xiaojun, Wang Xiaodong and Liu Yang
- Unhappy, a manga by Cotoji adapted into an anime series
