= Anti-Western sentiment in China =

Anti-Western sentiment has been increasing in China since the early 1990s, particularly amongst Chinese young adults. Notable incidents which have resulted in a significant anti-Western backlash have included the 1999 NATO bombing of the Chinese embassy in Belgrade, the 2008 demonstrations during the Olympic torch relay and alleged Western media bias, especially in relation to the March 2008 Tibet riots.

There remains suspicion over the West's motives towards China stemming largely from historical experiences and specifically the 'century of humiliation'. Some allege that these suspicions have been increased by the Chinese Communist Party's patriotic education.

== Background ==
=== Qing dynasty ===
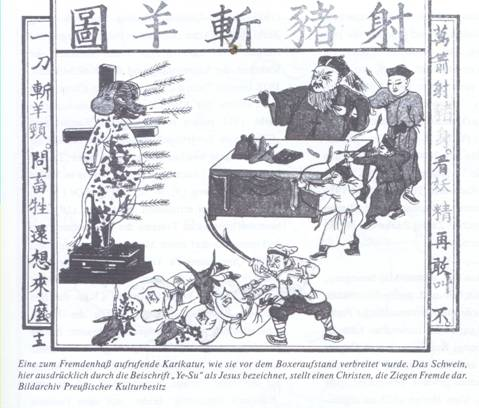
Foreigners shown as pig and goat and being slaughtered by Manchu officials, 1861.

Anti-Western sentiment manifested itself in the First and Second Opium Wars as well as the Boxer Rebellion when the Righteous Harmony Society attacked westerners, missionaries and converted Chinese Christians. The Qing dynasty was divided between anti-Westerners, moderates and reformists. A Manchu prince, Zaiyi, and a Chinese general Dong Fuxiang who led 10,000 Muslim Kansu Braves attacked foreigners and defeated them at the Battle of Langfang during the rebellion.

=== Muslims ===
Hatred of foreigners from high ranking Chinese Muslim officers stemmed from the way foreigners handled Chinese affairs, rather than for religious reasons, the same reason other non-Muslim Chinese hated foreigners. Promotion and wealth were other motives among Chinese Muslim military officers for anti foreignism.

=== Kuomintang anti-Westernism ===
Some members of the Kuomintang party held anti-Western sentiments. Kuomintang Muslim General Bai Chongxi led a wave of anti foreignism in Guangxi, attacking American, European, and other foreigners and missionaries, and generally making the province unsafe for foreigners. Westerners fled from the province, and some Chinese Christians were also attacked as imperialist agents. Westerners were attacked in the streets, with many of them fleeing to their respective consulates. The three goals of his movement were anti-foreignism, anti-imperialism, and anti-religion.

As a Kuomintang member, Bai and the other Guangxi clique members allowed the Communists to continue attacking foreigners and smash idols, since they shared the goal of expelling the foreign powers from China, but they stopped Communists from initiating social change.

General Bai also wanted to aggressively expel foreign powers from other areas of China. Bai gave a public speech in which he claimed that the ethnic minorities of China were suffering under "foreign oppression". Bai called upon the Chinese government and the people of China to assist them in expelling the foreigners from those lands. He personally wanted to lead an expedition to seize back Xinjiang to bring it under Chinese control, in the style that Zuo Zongtang led during the Dungan revolt. Bai Chongxi was a Hui himself.

The Blue Shirts Society, a fascist paramilitary organization within the Kuomintang modeled after Mussolini's blackshirts, was anti foreign and anti communist, and stated that its agenda was to expel foreign (Japanese and Western) Imperialists from China, crush communism, and eliminate feudalism. In addition to being anti Communist, some Kuomintang members, like Chiang Kaishek's right-hand man Dai Li were anti-American, and they wanted to expel American influence.

=== History ===
The causes of anti-Western sentiment in China include the collective memory of the period of Chinese history beginning with the two Opium Wars between 1839–1860 and ending with the expulsion of the Japanese after the Second World War which is known to the Chinese as the century of humiliation when China was sacked by a western coalition. Wang Zheng wrote that it was "attacked, bullied, and torn asunder by imperialists". Kenneth Lieberthal, a political science professor at the University of Michigan, has argued that the demonstrations in Western cities during the Olympic torch relay had "deep historical resonance" amongst Chinese, who suspect that after China's recovery from its fall in international stature from 150 years ago, "the West is trying to humiliate them again". Supporting this view, a 2007 survey found that 45% of the Chinese general public believed that the U.S. was "trying to prevent China from becoming a great power" compared to 32% who believed that the U.S. accepted "China's status as a rising power", 23% were "not sure". Although this sentiment has been partially assuaged by the return to China of Hong Kong and of Macau, the unresolved political status of Taiwan remains for some a reminder of China's weakness and division.

James Kelly, former US assistant secretary for East Asian and Pacific Affairs, has noted that nationalistic sentiments and anger over the torch protests was more concentrated amongst Chinese under the age of 30. Suisheng Zhao and Kenneth B. Pyle argue that a shift in Chinese education policy that these young adults experienced is partly responsible for their increased nationalism. Zheng Wang argues that by the 1990s the international situation had reduced the appeal of Communism as a legitimizing ideology for China's rulers. As a result, the leadership reversed many of the Chinese Communist Party's changes to Chinese historiography from 1949 that interpreted Chinese history as a history of class struggle. Announced in 1991 and fully functioning by 1994, this "Patriotic Education Campaign" reinterpreted history in national terms, rehabilitating figures like General Tso who suppressed a peasant rebellion but stemmed a Russian invasion of Xinjiang, and acknowledging the role of Chinese nationalist (rather than just communist) fighters in the Second Sino-Japanese War. Students find personal resonance more in such narratives than in previous classes about Marxist doctrine because they hear about the atrocities against China not just from history textbooks but from their parents and grandparents.

== From 1999 onwards ==
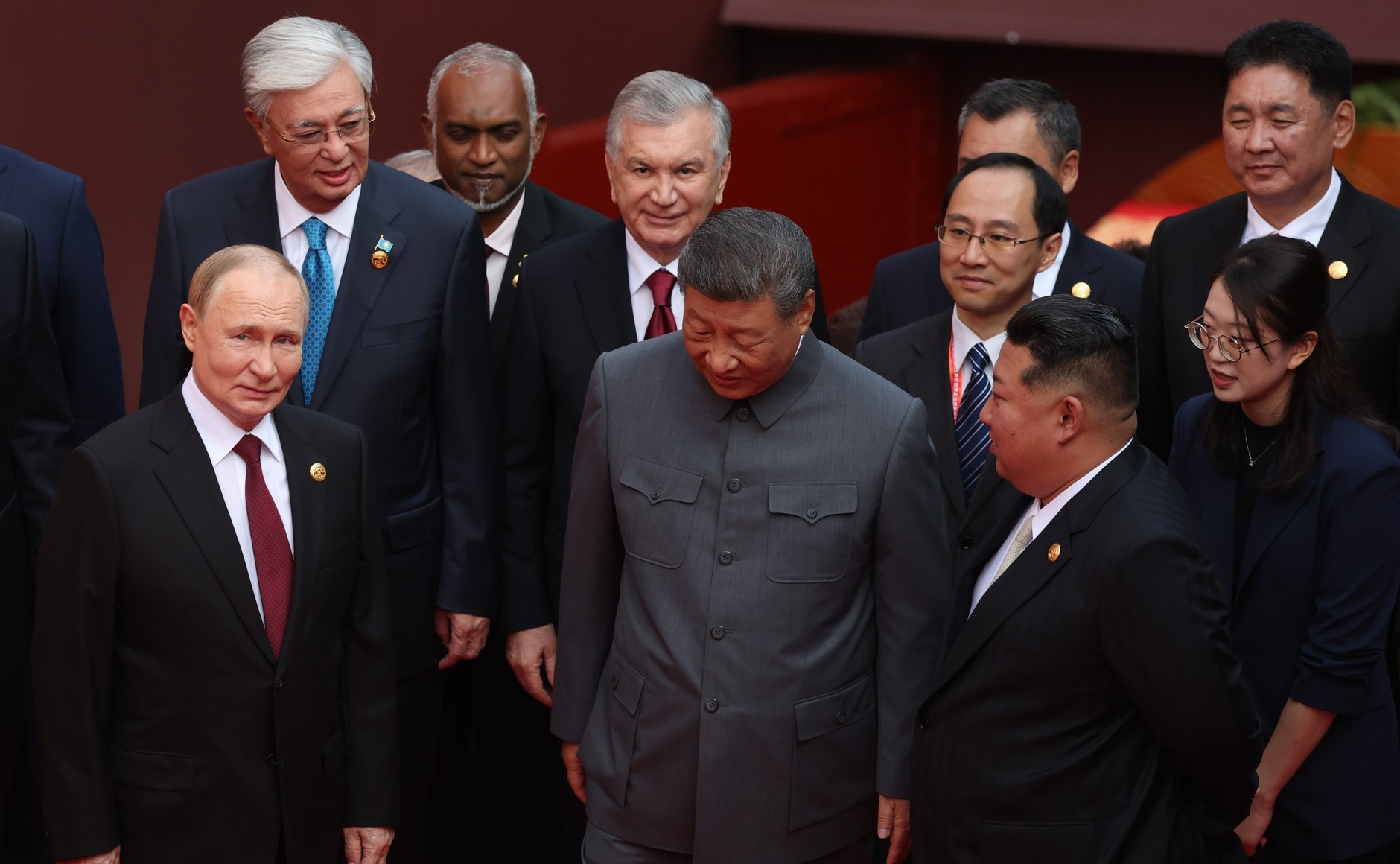
CCP General Secretary Xi Jinping with North Korean leader Kim Jong Un and Russian President Vladimir Putin before the 2025 China Victory Day Parade

=== 1999 NATO bombing of the Chinese embassy in Belgrade ===
On 7 May 1999, during Operation Allied Force, NATO aircraft bombed the Chinese embassy in Belgrade, killing three Chinese citizens. The US claimed that the bombing was an accident caused by the use of outdated maps but few Chinese accepted this explanation. The incident caused widespread anger and following the attack Chinese officials described the bombing as a "barbarian act" and a "war crime" while Chinese students in Europe and America demonstrated against 'NATO fascism'.

In China, thousands were involved in protest marches in Beijing and other provincial capitals, some protesters threw gas bombs and rocks at the diplomatic missions of the United States and other NATO countries while in Chengdu the American Consul's residence was firebombed.

=== 2008 Beijing Olympics torch relay protests ===
Prior to the 2008 Summer Olympic Games to be held in Beijing, the international leg of the Olympic torch relay was subject to widespread demonstrations primarily over "China's human rights record and Tibetan independence." In London, thirty-seven arrests were made when protestors clashed with police as the torch made its way through the city while in Paris the relay was cut short and the torch transported by bus after protestors disrupted the procession.

Protests also took place in Athens, Istanbul, Buenos Aires, Bangkok, Canberra, Nagano, and Seoul. In response, Chinese government officials condemned the protests and overseas Chinese organised 'pro-China' counter-demonstrations at torch processions, joined by counter-protests in many Chinese cities.

Despite the protests being aimed at specific issues raised through western media, Chinese state media sources, such as CCTV, referred to the protestors as being 'anti-Chinese'. In one instance, Chinese state-run news source China Daily reported that "[a]ll the recent protests against the 2008 Olympic torch relay are not against Chinese government, as some protesters repeated. They are against all of the ordinary Chinese people living everywhere in the world".

Chinese activists organised protests outside Carrefour stores in at least 10 Chinese cities and called on shoppers to boycott the French retailer following protests in Paris. Messages distributed via the internet and mobile phones had accused the company of supporting the Dalai Lama, a claim denied by Carrefour CEO Jose-Luis Duran.

=== 2019 Hong Kong protests ===
During the 2019–2020 Hong Kong protests, which began in opposition to a proposed extradition bill, Chinese officials and state media repeatedly attributed the unrest to interference by "foreign forces", particularly the United States and the United Kingdom. In June 2019 the Chinese Foreign Ministry issued a statement blaming Western media for inciting foreign governments to interfere, and in July China Daily accused Western forces of instigating the unrest to pressure the central government, amid a diplomatic dispute with the United Kingdom. State media described the demonstrations as the result of a "black hand" of foreign, chiefly American, interference. In August 2019 the Foreign Ministry sent a letter to senior editors at international media outlets setting out its account of the protests, citing largely state media reports on links between "foreign forces" and protesters.

State-run outlets also promoted this narrative on social media platforms inside and outside China, portraying protesters as "terrorists" manipulated by Western powers. A study by the cybersecurity firm Recorded Future of posts by Xinhua, People's Daily and other state-run accounts between June and August 2019 identified claims that Western powers were interfering in Hong Kong and that Western media showed only one side of the violence among their recurring themes. By November 2019, AFP reported that state media depicted the protesters as "barbarians" or "terrorists" backed by foreign forces.

The protests also produced a backlash against Western commercial and sporting institutions. In October 2019, after Daryl Morey, general manager of the Houston Rockets, posted a since-deleted tweet supporting the protesters, the Chinese Basketball Association suspended cooperation with the team, and sponsors and partners including Tencent and Li-Ning announced they would suspend ties. The state broadcaster CCTV stopped airing Rockets games and then halted broadcasts of NBA preseason games after the league's commissioner defended freedom of expression.

=== COVID-19 pandemic ===
As the COVID-19 pandemic was brought under control in China in early 2020 and spread abroad, Chinese officials and state media sought to deflect blame for the outbreak. Conspiracy theories that the United States military had brought the virus to Wuhan, often tied to the 2019 Military World Games held in the city in October 2019, circulated on Chinese social media from late February 2020. On 12 March 2020, Foreign Ministry spokesperson Zhao Lijian tweeted that "it might be US army who brought the epidemic to Wuhan", without providing evidence. The United States summoned Chinese ambassador Cui Tiankai over the claim. The exchange came as US Secretary of State Mike Pompeo had been referring to the outbreak as the "Wuhan virus" since early March.

In April 2020, following a cluster of cases linked to Nigerians in Guangzhou, African residents of the city reported being evicted from their homes, refused hotel rooms, and subjected to compulsory testing and quarantine. African diplomats lodged complaints with Beijing, while the Chinese government denied discriminating. The episode, directed chiefly at people of African origin, occurred amid wider anti-foreigner sentiment on Chinese social media, as the pandemic's centre shifted away from China and authorities moved to prevent a second wave of imported infections. Reporting at the time linked the heightened vigilance towards foreigners partly to state media portrayals of China as having handled the virus successfully while the rest of the world struggled.

=== 2021 Xinjiang cotton boycott ===
In March 2021, amid a dispute between Beijing and Western governments over human rights in Xinjiang, the Communist Youth League shared on Weibo a 2020 statement by the Swedish retailer H&M expressing concern about forced labour in the region's cotton industry. Chinese internet users called for boycotts of H&M and other Western brands, including Nike, Adidas and Burberry, that had made similar statements or belonged to the Better Cotton Initiative; state outlets including People's Daily and CCTV criticised the companies, and Alibaba and JD.com removed H&M products from sale. Chinese sportswear company Anta Sports said it would continue to use Xinjiang cotton and begin withdrawing from the initiative. Analysts told VOA that they believed Beijing's propaganda apparatus had stoked the backlash. H&M's sales in China fell by 28 percent in Swedish krona terms in the second quarter of 2021.

=== Media bias ===
Chinese netizens in both China and overseas have accused Western media sources of giving dishonest reports about riots in Tibet in March 2008. An article by the state-run China Daily reports that several Chinese activists accused, with substantiation, several Western media sources of misreporting and distorting the incident to tarnish China's image. Chinese sources opined on the matter, arguing that Western media reports of the Tibet violence had displayed "ignorance and prejudice", that the reporting of China more generally was "with few exceptions, only stories about censorship, spoiled food products, human rights issues, dangerous toys and the like... are published", and "stoking the young people's repulsion to the West and in turn aroused the patriotic passion of the young people". Several websites were created to challenge the Western media's reporting of China, including anti-cnn.com, whose founder Rao Jin described Western media reporting as "white supremacy".

In February 2020, during the early stages of the COVID-19 pandemic, the Chinese Foreign Ministry condemned a Wall Street Journal opinion article headlined "China Is the Real Sick Man of Asia" as "racially discriminatory" and demanded an apology. The phrase "sick man of Asia" had historically been applied to China during the century of humiliation. When the newspaper did not apologise, China revoked the press credentials of three of its Beijing-based reporters, although the Committee to Protect Journalists noted that the paper's news and opinion sections operate separately and that none of the three had been involved in the piece. Foreign Ministry spokesperson Zhao Lijian said the ministry was not interested in the division of labour within the newspaper.

Hostility towards Western news organisations has also been directed at individual journalists. In March 2021, after the BBC published a report on extralegal detention in Xinjiang, Chinese Communist Party social media accounts and Chinese diplomats launched a coordinated online campaign to discredit BBC correspondent Robin Brant. In July 2021, during the floods in Henan, Chinese officials accused the BBC of spreading "fake news", and the Henan branch of the Communist Youth League asked its 1.6 million Weibo followers to report Brant's whereabouts. A crowd in Zhengzhou subsequently surrounded a Deutsche Welle reporter, who had been mistaken for Brant, and a Los Angeles Times reporter, taking the German reporter's camera and briefly preventing both from leaving; the club said BBC, Los Angeles Times and other China-based staff later received death threats. The BBC called on the Chinese government to stop the attacks on its journalists. Foreign journalists described the hostility as the product of years of rising nationalist sentiment, with state media openly encouraging it.

In addition, the Chinese government has weighed in on the issue of media bias. Fu Ying, the Chinese Ambassador to the United Kingdom wrote that the Western media had attempted to 'demonise' China while in April 2008, the Chinese Foreign Ministry demanded an apology from CNN after news commentator Jack Cafferty referred to the Chinese as a "bunch of goons and thugs" for which CNN subsequently apologized.

James Kelly has argued that China's media censorship itself may be a major factor in fostering anti-Western sentiment, claiming that China's media gives a "very one-sided" view of the West.

=== Tibetan independence ===
On 2 March 2009 the Information Office of the State Council of the People's Republic of China published a white paper entitled: "Fifty Years of Democratic Reform in Tibet". In the paper the defeat of a Tibetan rebellion in 1959 is likened to the American civil war, arguing that China's abolition of Tibetan feudal serfdom was "entirely comparable to the emancipation of the slaves in the American civil war." The white paper goes on to argue that by supporting the 14th Dalai Lama "Western anti-China forces" were guilty of ignoring historical facts regarding Tibet and that:

"It is thus clear that the so-called "Tibet issue" is by no means an ethnic, religious and human rights issue; rather, it is the Western anti-China forces' attempt to restrain, split, and demonize China."

=== Cyber attacks ===
Following allegations of biased reporting by Western media outlets, especially CNN, regarding the March 2008 unrest in Tibet, CNN's website was hacked and replaced with a page proclaiming that "Tibet WAS, IS, and ALWAYS WILL BE a part of China". According to a report by Nick Lazaredes for Journeyman Pictures "patriotic hacking" by Chinese nationalists is on the rise and Western security experts estimate that there are up to 300,000 Chinese hackers ready to "wage a cyber-war."

== Surveys of public opinion about the US ==
In 2008, a report was prepared by the Committee of 100 with the assistance of Zogby International and the Horizon Research Consultancy Group. Entitled "Hope and Fear" the report outlined the results of opinion polls regarding Chinese and American attitudes towards each other. The report found that while a significant proportion of the Chinese general public believe that the Western media portrays China inaccurately, Chinese people generally hold favourable views of the U.S. and report themselves as being less 'highly patriotic' than Americans, as shown in the tables below:

Question asked: "Do you think that the U.S. media portrays an accurate picture of China?"
	Chinese General Public	Chinese Opinion Leaders	Chinese Business Leaders
Yes	15	20	44
No	49	53	44
Not sure	36	27	12

Question asked: "How would you describe your impressions of the U.S.?"
	Chinese General Public	Chinese Opinion Leaders	Chinese Business Leaders
Favourable	60	86	94
Unfavourable	26	11	6

Question asked: "On a scale of 1 to 5 where 1 is "not patriotic at all" and 5 is "highly patriotic," how would you rate your patriotism?"
	U.S. General Public	Chinese General Public
(1) Not at All	4	0
(2)	4	1
(3)	16	24
(4)	22	24
(5) Highly Patriotic	54	47
Not Sure	1	4

== See also ==
- Anti-American sentiment in China
- Anti-Japanese sentiment in China
- Anti-Korean sentiment in China
- China and the Russo-Ukrainian war
- COVID-19 misinformation by China
- Racism in China
- Sinophobia
- Wolf warrior diplomacy
