= Zhang Zangzang =

Chinese author and media figure (born 1964)

Zhang Zangzang (born 1964), born Zhang Xiabo, is a Chinese writer and the CEO of Phoenix Cultural Media. An avant-garde poet in the 1980s, Zhang and his co-authors wrote the 1990s Chinese nationalist bestselling book China Can Say No.

== Biography ==
Zhang was born in 1964.

He graduated from East China Normal University and worked in Zhenjiang's art propaganda department for approximately six months. Zhang then moved to Shanghai, where he was an avant-garde poet whose works focused on the metropolitan aesthetics of the 1980s.

In the 1990s, Zhang became a book seller.

Zhang is the CEO of Phoenix Cultural Media.

== Works ==
In the early 1990s, Zhang was struck by the strength with which the Chinese public expressed nationalist sentiment following a series of diplomatic disputes between China and the United States. In 1995, Zhang recruited four co-authors to write a book that would appeal to growing nationalist sentiment. These were Song Qiang (a college friend of Zhang's who was working as an advertising manager in Chongqing), Qiao Bian (a gardener at the Beijing Gardening and Greening Bureau), Gu Qingsheng (a Beijing-based freelance writer), and Tang Zhengyu (a reporter from the China Business Times). Zhang asked each author to write their portion of the book and combined their five sections as a collection of views. The resulting book, China Can Say No, became a benchmark for 1990s nationalist sentiment. Shortly after publication, Zhang and his co-authors became national celebrities.

The first 50,000 copies sold out on the day of release and an additional 100,000 copies sold within one month. Total sales are estimated at one million to two million copies. It has been translated into eight languages.
