= Wang Lijun incident =

2012 Chinese political scandal

Coordinates: 29.5500°N 106.5000°E

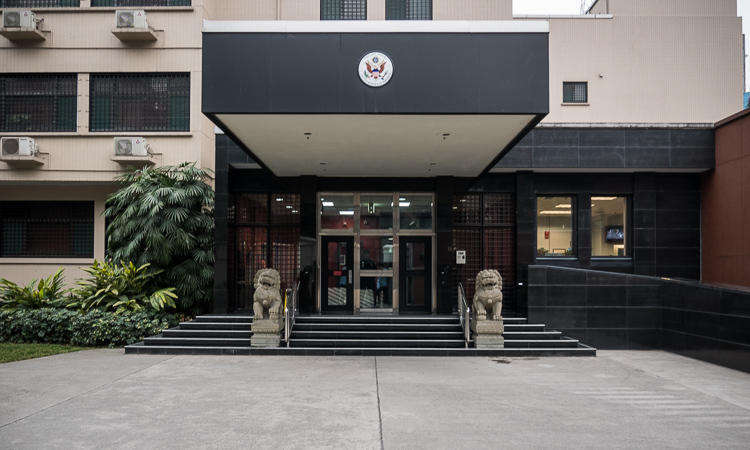
- The US consulate in Chengdu
- Simplified Chinese: 王立军事件
- Traditional Chinese: 王立軍事件
Transcriptions
Standard Mandarin
- Hanyu Pinyin: Wáng Lìjūn Shìjiàn

The Wang Lijun incident was a major Chinese political scandal which began in February 2012 when Wang Lijun, vice-mayor of Chongqing, was abruptly demoted, after revealing to the United States consulate details of British businessman Neil Heywood's murder and subsequent cover-up. Amidst rumors of political infighting with Chongqing Communist Party secretary Bo Xilai, Wang arranged a meeting on 6 February at the US consulate in Chengdu, where he remained for over 30 hours. Observers speculated that Wang may have been attempting to defect or to seek refuge from Bo. He then left the consulate of his own volition and was taken to Beijing by agents and the vice minister Qiu Jin (邱进) of the Ministry of State Security. The Chongqing municipal government declared that Wang was receiving "vacation-style medical treatment".

The scandal led to the abrupt end to the political career of Bo Xilai, who was seen as a top contender for a top leadership position at the 18th Party Congress in 2012. In the scandal's aftermath, Bo was dismissed from his position of Chongqing party chief, removed from the Politburo, and eventually charged with corruption and abuse of power. The scandal dealt a significant blow to the credibility of the "Chongqing model" and the "Red culture movement" promoted by Bo.

== Background ==
Wang Lijun was a police officer from northeastern China. Wang became acquainted with Bo Xilai during their time in Liaoning province, when Wang was a local police chief, and Bo was Governor. Wang had long built a reputation for himself as a 'gangbuster' in Liaoning law enforcement circles. Bo Xilai, an ambitious politician in the elite of the Communist Party, was also the son of Communist revolutionary elder Bo Yibo. In 2007, in a party leadership reshuffle, Bo Xilai was transferred from his post as Minister of Commerce in Beijing to become the Communist Party Secretary of Chongqing, an interior megacity with administrative status equivalent to a province. Wang followed closely in Bo's footsteps. Wang became the police chief of Chongqing and later also vice-mayor.

It was widely known in Chinese political circles that Bo Xilai took on the party chief job in Chongqing with some reluctance. Bo had long been considered as a prominent political figure with possibility to climb up the rank further, and his relocation to Chongqing was widely perceived as a de facto demotion. Bo, however, spearheaded a large number of populist campaigns in Chongqing, seemingly using the interior megacity as a launchpad for a protracted high-profile campaign to gain support for a seat on the Politburo Standing Committee, the pinnacle of power in mainland Chinese politics.

Bo's campaign in Chongqing was encapsulated in the phrase chang-hong da-hei (唱红打黑), literally "sing the red and strike the black". The "red" referred to nostalgia to the more "pure" Communism of the days of Mao, hearkening on themes of collective prosperity, and the "black" referred to criminal gangs that held immense control over political and business interests in Chongqing. Between 2008 and 2012, Bo's campaign against organized crime nabbed many high-ranking officials and prominent gang members, including judicial and public security official Wen Qiang and the "godmother" of Chongqing organized crime Xie Caiping. Wang Lijun became Bo's chief enforcer during the campaign.

=== Tieling corruption case ===
During his tenure in Tieling, Wang was allegedly involved in a corruption scandal. Details surrounding the case are unclear, though there is speculation that Wang may have been implicated in corruption. Wang's predecessor as director of the Teiling public security department, Gu Fengjie, has reportedly been detained pending investigation on corruption charges.

== Murder of Neil Heywood ==
According to later transcripts from court proceedings describing the events, sometime in November 2011, Bo's wife Gu Kailai and one of her associates had murdered British businessman Neil Heywood. Heywood was an associate of the Bo family who had provided assistance in the education of Bo Xilai's son Bo Guagua. The family had run into a money-related dispute with Heywood in 2011. Heywood was found dead in a suburban resort, and various Public Security officials subordinate to Wang then fabricated coroner's findings alleging that Heywood had died of alcohol poisoning.

It was said that between late 2011 and early 2012, Gu Kailai had taken steps to further destroy evidence related to the alleged murder, such as transferring out staff at the hotel in which the murder was supposed to have taken place. Wang apparently was displeased with Gu's suppression of evidence, believing that it would arouse unnecessary attention and create bigger problems. The dispute between Gu and Wang led to an erosion of trust. Ultimately, on 28 January 2012, Wang decided to address the issue with Bo Xilai directly. In an encounter between the two men in Chongqing, Bo slapped Wang in the face. Wang had reportedly taped a conversation with Gu Kailai which contained evidence implicating her in the murder. In his trial testimony, Bo suggested that he had slapped Wang because he suspected Wang was having an affair with Gu Kailai.

Under Bo's direction, Chongqing authorities placed under "investigation" several people involved in the case; many of whom were Wang's direct subordinates. Sensing that this was essentially a move to gag these individuals and further fearing that his own career was at stake, Wang attempted to contact the regional British consulate to provide evidence related to the alleged murder of Neil Heywood. However, for a variety of reasons he was unable to address substantive matters. He then resolved to reach out to the U.S. consulate in Chengdu.

== Visit to U.S. consulate ==
According to later testimonials and reports, Bo moved against Wang quickly in the ensuing political crisis. On 2 February 2012, Wang was relieved of his post as police chief and abruptly reassigned "to a post overseeing municipal education, science, and environmental affairs", regarded as a less prestigious post than his former public security office. A Communist Party report alleged in March 2012 that Bo Xilai had demoted Wang to derail a corruption investigation against Bo's family.

Although details are sparse, observers believe that Wang may have sought leniency with the Inspection Commission in exchange for information on corruption and embezzlement by Bo Xilai and/or his wife. Bo is speculated to have learned about Wang's accusations, and ordered the arrest of several of Wang's close allies and associates.

On 6 February 2012, Wang traveled to the U.S. consulate in Chengdu. After 30 hours and following a meeting with U.S. consular officials, Wang reportedly "left of his own volition". The Chinese Ministry of Foreign Affairs acknowledged on 9 February 2012 Wang's visit to the U.S. consulate, and said that the matter was "under investigation".

The U.S. Department of State did not comment on the content of the meeting, though observers speculated that Wang might have been seeking political asylum, or at a minimum was seeking to extricate himself from the reach of Bo Xilai, who had already allegedly arrested several of Wang's allies. According to the New York Times, Wang had sought political asylum in the consulate, which was denied.

Overseas Chinese-language dissident website Boxun alleged that Wang brought evidence incriminating Bo Xilai to the meeting at the consulate. Several people briefed on the matter said that Wang also provided information about Heywood's death, namely that he had been poisoned.

Seventy carloads of armed police had reportedly pursued Wang from Chongqing to Chengdu, and proceeded to surround the consulate while Wang was in the consulate. When authorities in Beijing were informed of the encirclement, they demanded the Chongqing security forces withdraw. Central authorities dispatched Qiu Jin, vice minister of State Security, to escort Wang to Beijing on a first-class flight.

On 9 February, several overseas Chinese-language websites posted an open letter allegedly written by Wang accusing Bo of corruption and harboring criminal connections. The letter, apparently secretly sent to friends overseas prior to his forced leave, referred to Bo as "the greatest gangster in China." There are Internet rumours that Wang entered the U.S. Consulate with documents incriminating Bo asking for their safekeeping.

== Aftermath ==
Shortly after Wang's meeting at the U.S. consulate, Chongqing government information offices sought to discredit Wang by stating he was "seriously indisposed due to long term overwork and intense mental stress. Currently he has been authorized to undergo vacation-style medical treatment." The phrase became a target of derisive mockery on the Chinese internet; microblogs seized on the opportunity to make an internet meme out of the phrase "vacation-style treatment," and a plethora of parodies surfaced. One post read: "Let's continue: Consoling-style rape, harmony-style looting, environmental-style murder, scientific-style theft."

As the chain of events unfolded Chinese government censors began blocking keywords on an ad hoc basis, such as "U.S. Consulate", "political asylum", "Governor Bo" etc. Many of the keywords were unblocked and re-blocked intermittently. "Wang Lijun" was blocked on 4 February, but was unblocked four days later. Microblogs were inundated with references to the Wang story with no significant interference from censors. The mixed reactions from the authorities led to speculation that the government was unsure about how to deal with the events, or that they were letting word spread deliberately to weaken Bo's political base.

In the aftermath of the event, political commentators speculated Wang's actions might imperil Bo Xilai's further political advancement. China analyst Willy Wo-Lap Lam suggested that the Wang Lijun incident would doom Bo's chances of further advancement to the Politburo Standing Committee: "When they do the horse-trading in Beijing, his enemies will definitely use this to shoot down his candidacy," said Lam.

Han Deqiang of the neo-leftist Utopia website called it "a serious blow to the Chongqing Model" promoted by Bo. Gao Wenqian, senior analyst with Human Rights in China, wrote that the event served to discredit the "core socialist values" promoted by Bo Xilai through the "red culture movement" in Chongqing. "Its repercussion is comparable to that of the Lin Biao Incident in the late 1970s, which led to the demise of the Cultural Revolution and the mythology surrounding Mao Zedong", wrote Gao.

In early March 2012, party general secretary Hu Jintao denounced Wang as a traitor to the Communist Party and the nation in an internal briefing relayed to members of the Communist Party's Political Consultative Conference. The government later publicly described Wang's decision to seek refuge in an American consulate as a "serious political incident". The incident is seen by Hu Shuli as bearing consequences for Sino-American relations, especially on top of the death of British national Neil Heywood.

Bo Xilai was absent from the opening meeting of the National People's Congress on 8 March—the only member of the 25-member Politburo not in attendance. Although he later appeared at the meeting and gave a press conference to both local and foreign journalists, his initial failure to appear, coupled with more recent charges by former rivals and spurned businessmen, ignited speculation about his political future. Bo was replaced as Chongqing Communist Party Secretary on 15 March 2012, following public comments by Premier Wen Jiabao about the need for Chongqing officials to seriously reflect on the Wang Lijun incident.

=== Coup rumours ===
In mid-March 2012, allegations of a coup d'état led by Bo and Zhou Yongkang, Bo's strongest supporter in the Politburo Standing Committee, spread across the internet, via overseas Chinese-language websites. There were also allegations that gunshots were heard in Beijing. However, the rumors of a coup were proven false, although the allegations underscored the tensions between the economic reformist and Maoist traditionalist factions of the Communist Party regarding the political crisis. The Chinese government later arrested six people and shut down sixteen websites for allegedly spreading rumors of the coup. Later report shows that Zhou has effectively lost his power after the attempted coup, and he was arrested in December 2013 due to corrpution.

=== Trials ===
Bo Xilai's wife Gu Kailai was convicted of the poisoning of Heywood and received a suspended death sentence in August 2012. In September 2012, Wang was convicted on charges of abuse of power, bribery, and defection, and sentenced to fifteen years in prison. In August 2013, Bo Xilai was sentenced to life in prison for bribery, abuse of power and corruption.

== See also ==
- Politics of the People's Republic of China
- The Laundromat (2019 film)
