= April Media =

Chinese news website

April Media (until 2009, Anti-CNN) is a website established by Rao Jin, who was a 23-year-old Chinese student at the time, in response to what he identified as "the lies and distortions of facts from the Western media" concerning the 2008 Tibetan unrest and the People's Republic of China's national unity. The site states its purpose as "collect, classify, and exhibit the misbehavior of Western media". According to the website, the former name "Anti-CNN" did not exclusively indicate its objection to the American company CNN, but also to many other Western media sources, including the BBC, Der Spiegel, la Repubblica, n-tv, Bild, Fox News and RTL. The website states, "We are not against the western media, but against the lies and fabricated stories in the media. We are not against the western people, but against the prejudice from the western society."

== Claims and responses ==
Following the 2008 Tibetan unrest and the disruptions to the 2008 Olympic Torch relay, Rao Jin viewed a niche as existing for a private media outlet in China that could rally what he called "April youths" to "seize the discursive power" for China. Believing that China should increase its soft power, Rao established Anti-CNN to counter what he contended was lies and distortions broadcast by Western media outlets like CNN.

April Media (under the then-name Anti-CNN) has contended that Western media has frequently implied that it has been the Chinese police, and not rioters, who have killed people. Description of events during the 2008 Tibet incident were positioned alongside phrases such as 'Chinese crackdown', giving a false impression that the Chinese authorities, not the rioters, were the cause of the injuries and killings. According to Rao Jin, CNN and BBC only reported selectively, and grossly misrepresented the incident.

Rao was invited to attend an interview show by the China Central Television in the program of Oriental Horizon (东方时空). The title of the show was "Warning to CNN: why the Chinese Internet folks got angry" (正告CNN：中国网民为何愤怒). During the interview, Rao said that he had established the site "to expose the facts, to make the facts publicized to as many people as possible". The site now claims about 500,000 visits per day, 60% of which are from China.

A report in The Washington Post detailing Chinese reactions to Western coverage quoted Rao as saying that more than 1,000 people have e-mailed him, volunteering to spot distorted reports in Western media. A Chinese analyst said that protests may only push Chinese government to adopt a more hard-line position. The report ended with a comment from Michael Pettis, a professor of management, which said "as China becomes a world power, there is going to be a lot more scrutiny and criticism. Just as Americans have learned to deal with it, the Chinese are going to have to learn to deal with it. My hope is that after the anger there will be some reflection on the complexity of these issues."

Some of the media accused of making distorted reports have given replies. CNN made a formal response to the charges of the cropping of cover pictures and mismatching captions, but asserted that the selection of material was "appropriate for the editorial context, and will not cause any confusion". Der Spiegel mentioned the site in an editorial, where it referred to the argument over the credibility of Western media on this particular issue with the headline "the war over words". Der Spiegel however refused to respond to the charges made, implying that the site is part of "Chinese propaganda". They also blamed the Chinese government's media control policy, saying that it forces the media to turn to "hard to confirm" evidence and "increases the risk of making mistakes and errors", which in turn "makes it easier for the Chinese authorities to accuse them".

This site first received global attention in the PRC Foreign Ministry spokesman Qin Gang's regular press conference on 27 March 2008 when he was asked to comment on the website. One journalist put forward a question whether the Chinese government had financed or supported the Anti-CNN website. Qin Gang's response was that "It is the irresponsible and unethical reports that infuriated our people to voice voluntarily their condemnation and criticism."

Access to the site was reportedly blocked within the United Nations.

== Name change ==
In 2009 Anti-CNN changed its name and has expanded into English under the name April Media. Rao described April Media as a "new patriotic cultural product."

== See also ==
- Chinese nationalism
- Media bias
- CNN controversies
- Fenqing
- Anti-Western sentiment in China
