= Red culture movement =

Political movement in Chongqing, China

The red culture movement, officially known as Singing revolutionary songs, Reading classic books, Telling stories and Spreading mottos (Chinese: 唱红歌、读经典、讲故事、传箴言) or Singing, Reading, Telling and Spreading (Chinese: 唱读讲传) is a political movement launched by Bo Xilai in Chongqing, People's Republic of China, as part of the Chongqing model. It is one of Bo's two main political movements, along with Chongqing gang trials. Started in 2008, the movement caused impact around China.

== Meanings ==
- Singing revolutionary songs, commonly known as singing red songs, is singing songs that praise the Chinese Communist Party (CCP), the People's Liberation Army (PLA), the People's Republic of China and socialism. Bo aimed to instill patriotic feelings through the promotion of "red songs." As of the end of 2010, Chongqing had organized 155,000 events for singing red songs. Singing red songs also trended around the country.
- Reading classic books simply means reading classic quotations, poetry masterpieces, and excellent prose. Chongqing residents sent 170 million messages of "red classics" via mobile phones and QQ.
- Telling stories specifically means telling stories about the history of the CCP, the PLA, and the PRC.
- Spreading mottos means spreading famous sayings, maxims, aphorisms or new creation of text fragments via text messages, microblogs and so on. In May 2009, Bo Xilai sent 13 million phone Chongqing mobile phone users his most inspirational Mao quotations.

== Reactions ==
This emphasis on red culture was intended to counter the negative effects of commercialism and consumerism.

Reactions to the red culture movement were divided. Bo's revival of Mao-era culture and accompanying social welfare programs were popular within certain segments of society, and made Bo popular with both Marxists and neo-leftists. One student quoted in The Washington Post embraced the ethos of the campaign, saying, "When I sing red songs, I find a kind of spirit I never felt when singing modern songs …To surround yourself with material stuff is just a waste of time." A group of retired participants in a red song routine told the Los Angeles Times "We know these songs from our youth. We grew up with revolutionary spirit and we want to pass that on to our children." Another noted that he felt compelled to participate in order to express appreciation of the CCP for the country's strong economy. The red culture movement attracted Chinese New Left intellectuals.

However, the campaign was unsettling to others—particularly the intelligentsia. A 57-year-old lawyer told The Washington Post, "I saw the beatings of the teachers by the Red Guards. It was horrible …Young people may not recognize it. But for us who lived through it, how can we possibly sing?" An academic quoted in The Daily Telegraph described the mandatory campaign as akin to being "drowned in a Red sea." Another critic wrote, "[S]ince China's 'spectacular economic rise,' an aspiring hegemonic power consisting of late capitalism and new authoritarianism emerges onto the global scene to conduct a grand finale to the finale of the very concept of historical progression. ... The new Mao of the twenty-first century has at moments ceased to be as much a pop-consumerist icon as anything else and as it was in the 1990s." In September 2009, a mid-level official in the city committed suicide after being pressured to organize his work unit to participate in the red songs campaign. The official, Xie Dajun, reportedly disagreed with the campaign, which evoked painful memories of the Cultural Revolution. Bo's critics and opponents derisively referred to him as "little Mao," with some expressing concern about the resemblance of the red culture campaign to the Cultural Revolution.

== Ending ==
Bo's deputy, vice-mayor of Chongqing Wang Lijun fled into the US consulate in Chengdu on 6 February 2012, has led to the downfall of Bo Xilai. Bo was removed from Chongqing on 15 March 2012. Vice Premier Zhang Dejiang was appointed as new party secretary of Chongqing. Zhang terminated many of Bo's policy, which marked the end of red culture movement.

== See also ==
- Propaganda in China
- Chongqing model#Red culture movement
