= Peaceful Evolution theory =

American foreign policy concept regarding China

The Peaceful Evolution theory or Peaceful Evolution (Chinese: 和平演變; Chinese: 和平演变; pinyin: Hépíng yǎnbiàn; Vietnamese: Diễn biến hòa bình; lit. 'Peaceful happenings' or 'Peaceful transformation') in international political thought refers to a theory of effecting political transformation of the Chinese and Vietnamese socialist systems by peaceful means. The transformation was allegedly encouraged by the United States.

The phrase was formulated by US Secretary of State John Foster Dulles during the Cold War in the 1950s chiefly in the context of the Soviet Union, but has not subsequently featured in official discussions of US policy in China. Chinese analyses of US foreign policy, however, hold that it has constituted part of the theoretical foundation for US relations with the People's Republic of China since then.

According to the thesis, the United States maintains a strategy to infiltrate and subvert socialist countries, notably China, by spreading Western political ideas and lifestyles, inciting discontent, and encouraging groups to challenge the Chinese Communist Party (CCP) and Communist Party of Vietnam (CPV) leadership. According to Chinese readings of the US policy, such efforts are intended to cause socialist systems to be transformed from within.

The CCP has resisted the idea of Peaceful Evolution when the idea was first raised in the Mao era. The CCP sees such a process as "the biggest threat to its continuous rule."

Successive generations of CCP leaders have criticized the Peaceful Evolution theory, including Mao Zedong, Deng Xiaoping, Hu Jintao, and Jiang Zemin. The theory is not currently part of official US policy approach to China, but Chinese military strategists consider it a cause of ongoing concern, as presented in the film Silent Contest.

== Origins ==
The precise locution "peaceful evolution" was a modification, by John Foster Dulles, of the doctrine originally outlined by George F. Kennan, who, in his Long Telegram of February 22, 1946, proposed that the socialist and capitalist blocs could reach a state of "peaceful coexistence."

This was augmented by Dulles over a decade later, in speeches of 1957–58, to "promoting peaceful evolution towards democracy."

In a speech, Dulles referred to "the use of peaceful means" to "accelerate the evolution of government policies within the Sino-Soviet bloc" in order to "shorten the expected life span of communism."

Dulles contended that the socialist states could be transformed through the slow introduction of foreign ideas.

According to Bo Yibo (father of Bo Xilai) Mao Zedong heard about Dulles' remarks and took them seriously, ordering top CCP cadres to study the speeches. Mao saw the idea of Peaceful Evolution as a serious policy threat, a "much more deceptive tactic" to corrupt China, and a war against the socialist powers by non-military means. Mao's concerns about this tactic coincided with what he construed as a revisionist turn by Soviet Union and contributed to his call to "never forget class struggle". In 1964, Mao's concerns about the risk of Peaceful Evolution prompted an increased effort to develop Chinese youth as "revolutionary successors". Mao felt that the war was already being waged, with some effect, against the Soviet Union. After the dissolution of the Soviet Union, the CCP became more concerned about the strategy.

== Uses of the term ==
An Ziwen's 1964 article Fostering Revolutionary Successors as a Strategic Task for the Party was among the analyses circulated at the top levels of the CCP which called attention to the strategy. In particular, An focused on Dulles's statement at an October 28, 1958 press conference that peaceful evolution was "absolutely possible in a few hundred years, but perhaps just a matter of a few decades." In a piece that appeared in Stories of Young Heroes, Luo Ruiqing described the theory of peaceful evolution as one of "sugar-coated bombs," with the "sugar coat" referring to bourgeois lifestyle and material enjoyment promoted by the US.

Following China's entry into the Korean War, it sought to remove American-affiliated cultural influence from China. It continued to oppose American cultural efforts tied to the idea of peaceful evolution in the following decades.

The overall utility of the term for Chinese analysts is that it sums up a range of the threats to the regime's political security, faced by the CCP in the post-Cold War era. These threats are mostly connected with the United States, and are seen as part of the United States' own foreign policy after the collapse of the Soviet Union.

However, the term is now often used by Chinese scholars to condemn any foreign activities (including cultural, economic, social) that are seen as problematic for the CCP—not just those that are actually intended to undermine it. It is also used to dismiss out of hand United States criticism on the Chinese government's human rights record, on the theory that the West is simply attempting to undermine the Chinese people's respect for the CCP.

Academic Russell Ong argues that the typical Chinese uses of the term—as a conspiratorial plot—are too "vague and all embracing; its meaning ranges from dark conspiracies involving the alleged plotters of the counter revolutionary rebellion [a reference to the Tiananmen Square massacre] to the broad spectrum of cultural, social, and economic exchanges with the outside world."

While Peaceful Evolution ideas are often attributed to the foes of China, observers have suggested that some officials in the Chinese government—such as Wen Jiabao—support the process. These allegedly reform-oriented officials, however, are not considered part of the CCP's mainstream.

=== Post-Tiananmen Square protests and massacre ===
Chinese sensitivities to the idea of a Peaceful Evolution strategy by foreign powers were heightened following the 1989 Tiananmen Square protests and massacre and the series of regime collapses in Eastern Europe later that year. Initially, CCP leaders deemed the regime changes in the European countries as an "internal affair." In their own meetings, however, they declared them a matter of foreign subversion, also known as peaceful evolution.

Deng Xiaoping believed that economic reforms should continue after order was restored, whereas Chen Yun and other conservatives argued that the protests resulted from Deng’s liberalization policies under Hu Yaobang and Zhao Ziyang. They proposed revising the 13th Party Congress (1987)’s focus on economic construction to include resistance against “peaceful evolution” — a term denoting democratization via trade and openness. Modernization theory holds that economic development fosters individual autonomy, social secularization, and civil society, ultimately leading to democratization. This notion of “peaceful evolution” both legitimized the West’s post-1989 engagement with China and strengthened conservative calls to roll back reform.

Wang Zhen sought to arm People's Liberation Army troops with the ideological shield to guard against Western idea—while on a military inspection tour of Xinjiang he said "unswervingly follow the socialist road... the road may be winding and the struggle fierce... In our opposition to peaceful evolution, a key tenet is to fortify the brains of the entire party with Marxism–Leninism and Mao Zedong Thought." Deng Liqun was also among the Chinese leadership who contended that Reform and Opening Up made China more susceptible to the peaceful evolution strategy.

A three-part article was published in the People's Daily after the massacre titled "On Peaceful Evolution." It argued that the collapse of communist regimes in Europe were a result of "bourgeois liberalization," which refers to Peaceful Evolution, and that the democracy protests in China had also been an attempt to "negate party leadership by political pluralism, and negate public ownership in the economy by privatization." The CCP's crackdown was able to "crush the peaceful evolution strategy of the imperialists," according to scholar Jialin Zhang.

== Perceptions in China ==
Among state-affiliated intellectuals and strategists in the PRC, the term and theory of Peaceful Evolution is a threat and an attempt to undermine the CCP's rule. The hardline scholar Huo Shiliang of the Chinese Academy of Social Science's says that after Dulles, the Americans' policy of attempting to peaceful transform China accelerated:

Before June 4 China considered the United States as a trustworthy and friendly country, but since June 4 the United States has become the main source of instability in China. Peaceful evolution is the main threat to China's stability today. The ideological struggle will be the most important factor in future Sino-American relations. The U.S. will again become the major threat to China, but not a military one. The Taiwan problem will remain important. but the ideological struggle—particularly peaceful evolution—will be primary.

The theory of Peaceful Evolution is a key part of Chinese official assessments of the collapse of the Soviet Union. In bracing themselves against the Americans' soft power approaches, and attempts to undermine the regime, they have advocated a series of countermeasures. According to Li Jingjie, the director of the former Soviet-Eastern Europe Institute at the Chinese Academy of Social Sciences, there are eight lessons that China must draw from the Soviet collapse, due in part to the infiltration of Peaceful Evolution:

- Concentrate on growth
- Be ideologically flexible
- Learn from capitalist countries
- Maximize the "comprehensive power" of the state, but lift living standards also
- Expand inner-Party democracy, struggle against corruption
- Treat intellectuals fairly
- Comprehend the complexity and causes of ethnic problems
- Carry out economic reforms, and include some political reforms

Like many others in China's leadership, Xi Jinping believes that peaceful evolution contributed to the disintegration of the Soviet Union, as well as colour revolutions in post-Soviet Eurasia, the Middle East, and Africa.

== Other contexts ==
The term Peaceful Evolution has been used in the context of China and modernization outside the sphere of international relations. Scholars of China's media environment have used it to refer to the marketization of the press in China, where state control by the CCP lessens while the forces of commercialization take hold—though whether the media sphere in China has really evolved along such lines is disputed.

== See also ==
- Dulles' Plan, a post-Cold War conspiracy theory centering around an alleged plan by CIA director Allen Dulles (brother of John Foster Dulles) to destroy the Soviet Union
- Political warfare
- Peaceful coexistence – Cold War policy of peaceful relations between Communist and Capitalist nations
