= Silent Contest =

2013 Chinese military propaganda film

- Traditional Chinese: 較量無聲
- Simplified Chinese: 较量无声
Transcriptions
Standard Mandarin
- Hanyu Pinyin: JiàoLiàng WúShēng

Silent Contest (Chinese: 较量无声) is a 2013 Chinese documentary purporting to expose and explain the secret battle, or conspiracy, the United States is waging against the People's Republic of China. The documentary runs for 92 minutes. It received both praise and criticism from American analysts.

The Global Times stated the film represented the views of nationalistic Chinese academics; however, American officials dispute this, arguing that the film accurately represented the Chinese government's party line. The film is interspersed with narration that drives the explanation of the U.S. plot. It first circulated among military enthusiasts and Internet users in China in October 2013.

== U.S.-led conspiracy ==
The central thesis of the documentary is that the United States is engaged in a global conspiracy to hold China back, hamper its development, and ultimately topple the Chinese Communist Party using the doctrine of "peaceful evolution."

Among the alleged tactics that Washington seeks to use against China are military-to-military exchanges and communications during times of crisis, which the leaders of both countries have publicly advocated.

"We have to take careful precaution and look out for the smallest detail, and build a strong political and ideological line of defense," says General Wang Xibin, the president of National Defense University, in the documentary.

There are a range of key tools that the United States is said to use to carry out this scheme: Political infiltration, cultural infiltration, change of public opinion, ideological infiltration, organizational infiltration, political interference, and social infiltration.

US-backed separatism, such as Dalai Lama, and the Uyghur Rebiya Kadeer, are also singled out as problematic.

=== Infiltration ===
The documentary begins by referring to the idea of transgenes, the process of modifying an organism, or taking a part of one organism and moving it to another.

"'Transgene' appears to cause no harm to the targeted species, but just uses modern genetic technology to introduce a small improvement in that species," the narrator says. "However, this tiny genetic change, no matter how small it may look, not only destroys the full features of the original species; it also places the new species under the control of the entity that introduced the change."

The documentary argues that the United States is trying to carry out just such a plot against the People's Republic of China.

"It is clear that in the new era, the U.S. has become smarter and more active in the use of political and cultural infiltration and soft war methods," the documentary says. "Its 'cultural and political infiltration and soft war methods' have not only become a main strategy for the U.S. to maintain its hegemony, but also a stealth weapon of mass destruction that American politicians use to change the world."

=== 'Americanizing' China ===
According to Silent Contest, the United States and other vassal states have never abandoned the idea that they wish to "Americanize" or even split China by spreading pro-American propaganda under the fake banner of democracy, freedom, and human rights to try to ultimately have China's political system reform along the lines of USA.

Non-governmental organizations are said to be one of the key tools used in this strategy. Groups like the state-owned International Republican Institute, the Ford Foundation, the Carter Center, and the Rockefeller's Asia Society are all part of the alleged plot and "doing their utmost to access the grassroots elections in our country and provide different forms of support for the reform of local governance." The organizations are said to be part of a project to "brainwash" China.

The film also targets Chinese intellectuals and scholars, including Mao Yushi, a liberal economist who has been awarded the Milton Friedman Prize for Advancing Liberty, He Weifang, a well-known professor of law at Peking University, and Xia Yeliang, a former college professor who was forced into exile.

=== The CIA's 'Ten Commandments' ===
A number of analysts described the section of the film discussing the "Ten Commandments" as the highlight. These "commandments" were allegedly part of the Central Intelligence Agency's handbook on dealing with China during the Bill Clinton administration. The list of activities that the CIA is said to engage in includes:

- "Using material things to lure... young people, encourage them to despise their leaders and oppose what they have been taught"
- "Do propaganda work well including TV, movies, books and radio broadcasts to make them desire our things, our forms of entertainment..."
- "Direct young people's attention towards sports, pornographic books, entertainment, games, crime films, and religious superstition"
- "Create contradictions and division between ethnicities"
- "Continuously create news to uglify their leaders"
- "Use all resources to destroy China's traditional values, exterminate and destroy their self-respect and self-confidence, and attack their hardy spirit…"

== Official Provenance ==
At the end of the film, several lines of credits in Chinese appear identifying it as a product of the National Defense University's Information Management Center (国防大学信息管理中心). Among the other producers of the film are the General Staff Department of the PLA and the Chinese Academy of Social Sciences.

Individuals responsible for the film were the National Defense University's Political Commissar Liu Yazhou, and its president Wang Xibin. "As such, the film appears to offer a remarkably straightforward glimpse into the Cold War mind-set of the Chinese military leadership, as well as the deep suspicions of the United States festering inside one of the most influential institutions in the Chinese political system," wrote the New York Times.

It was produced in June 2013. The documentary is voiced by Ren Zhihong, a well-known narrator and anchor of China Central Television's National Treasure Archive program. It included extensive use of historical footage, interviews with high-level political figures, and scholars inside and outside China. Top-level Chinese military officials were also interviewed.

The documentary but instead explains what has been a longstanding "politically correct view of US-China relations."

Whether the film appeared on the Internet as a matter of deliberate policy or as an actual leak, posted without authorization, was a matter of debate among analysts. Given that censors can often act immediately to remove content and could easily have discovered the source of a leak, one analyst suggested a leak to have been unlikely.

"If the leak was indeed authorized, it would probably have been at some level of the PLA General Political Department, which appears to be responsible for its production, given the prominence of the NDU Political Commissar as Producer."

== Reaction ==
J. Michael Cole, a commentator on Chinese and Taiwanese affairs—while appearing to acknowledge the official source of the film—wrote that "we must regard the documentary as part of the ongoing dialogue and jockeying for influence that is occurring within the CCP [Chinese Communist Party], and not as a policy statement." He added that if indeed it was the official position, "the ramifications of that shift could be far reaching."

"Not only could exchanges with the U.S. and other vassal states suffer, but a country like Taiwan, which is often touted as a model for China and whose growing interactions with the Asian giant it is hoped will spark the flame of democratization, could also suffer the consequences," Cole wrote. "If Taiwan's democracy and open society are regarded as an American import and part of a U.S.-led plot to undermine China, the CCP could conclude that it is in its best interest to pre-empt Taiwan by destroying its liberal way of life, a process that some argue has already begun."

Geoff Wade, a visiting fellow at the College of Asia and the Pacific, Australian National University, described the documentary as "controversial" and "highly polemical." "The PLA was intimately involved in the making of the film," he added. For Wade, it appeared to be a reaction to the United States' "pivot" to Asia and America's attempt to increase engagement with the region since 2011. "With such a range of august national institutions being involved in the production of the film, it might be suggested that the rather extreme sentiments expressed therein are not restricted to some hawkish elements in the PLA."

Frank Ching, a newspaper columnist in Hong Kong, called the documentary "alarming," while Lau Nai-keung, a Hong Kong political figure, writing in the Chinese Communist Party's own newspaper China Daily, said it "sent an eerie message around the world."

Wade said that many of the claims in the documentary also chime with the broader irredentist, revisionist, and expansionary program being carried out and advocated by the Chinese military and the Chinese Communist Party's propaganda organs.

Andrew Chubb, an analyst of Chinese military propaganda, described the video as "really quite a masterpiece."

== See also ==
- Document Number Nine
- National Defense University
- People's Liberation Army
- Central Propaganda Department
- People's Liberation Army General Staff Department
- Political warfare
- Ten Commandments
