= Song Qiang =

Chinese writer

Song Qiang is a co-author of China Can Say No, The Way Out For China: Under the Shadow of Globalization and Unhappy China. He keeps a Chinese language blog, 开花の身体, in which he intersperses musings on the culinary arts with nationalist-themed rhetoric.

In 1995, Zhang Zangzang recruited four co-authors to write a book that would appeal to growing nationalist sentiment in China. These included Song (who was working as an advertising manager in Chongqing and was a college friend of Zhang), Qiao Bian (a gardener at the Beijing Gardening and Greening Bureau), Gu Qingsheng (a Beijing-based freelance writer), and Tang Zhengyu (a reporter from the China Business Times). Zhang asked each author to write their portion of the book and combined their five sections as a collection of views. The resulting book, China Can Say No, became a benchmark for 1990s nationalist sentiment. Shortly after publication, the authors became national celebrities.

Song's section of China Can Say No is The Death of Heaven's Mandate and the Coming of a New Order, an autobiographical account of Song's development from a naive pro-American student to a Chinese patriot.
