= Unhappy China =

2009 book

Unhappy China: The Great Time, Grand Vision and Our Challenges
- Author: Song Qiang, Huang Jisu, Song Xiaojun, Wang Xiaodong and Liu Yang
- Original title: 中国不高兴：大时代、大目标及我们的内忧外患
- Publication date: March 2009

Unhappy China: The Great Time, Grand Vision and Our Challenges (Chinese: 中国不高兴：大时代、大目标及我们的内忧外患; pinyin: Zhōngguó bù gāoxìng: Dà shídài, dà mùbiāo jí wǒmen de nèiyōu wàihuàn) is a book written by Song Qiang, Huang Jisu, Song Xiaojun, Wang Xiaodong and Liu Yang and published in March 2009. The book, a follow-up to China Can Say No, encourages China to become a hegemon rather than getting cast aside.

The book was a bestseller, selling over 100,000 copies in the month after publication.

== Content ==
Generally, the book describes China as a country which should not be satisfied with a subsidiary position in the global order. Unhappy China depicts the country as manufacturing cheap products for the benefit of western countries which are ungrateful and which unfairly blame China for various global issues, including pollution and claims of neo-colonization in Africa.
