= Consulate General of the United States, Chengdu =

American consulate in Sichuan, China

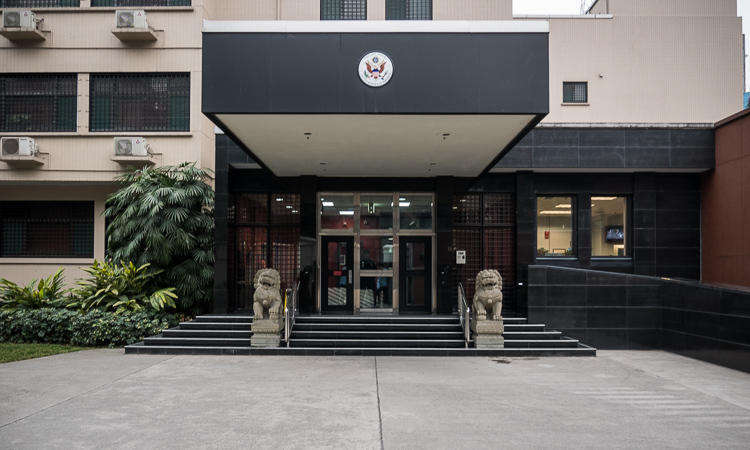
- Location: Chengdu, Sichuan, China
- Address: No. 4 Lingshiguan Road, Wuhou District, Chengdu (since August 2, 1993)
- Coordinates: 30°37′37″N 104°03′58″E
- Opened: October 16, 1985
- Closed: July 27, 2020
- Consul General: Jim Mullinax (last)
- Website: Official website

Consulate General of the United States, Chengdu
- Simplified Chinese: 美国驻成都总领事馆
- Traditional Chinese: 美國駐成都總領事館
- Literal meaning: America station Chengdu general consul house
Transcriptions
Standard Mandarin
- Hanyu Pinyin: Měiguó zhù Chéngdū Zǒnglǐngshìguǎn
- Wade–Giles: Mei-kuo chu Ch'eng-tu Tsung-ling-shih-kuan

The Consulate General of the United States, Chengdu (Chinese: 美国驻成都总领事馆) was a diplomatic mission in Wuhou District, Chengdu, China from 1985 to 2020.

This was one of seven American diplomatic and consular posts in China. The consular district included the provinces of Sichuan, Yunnan, and Guizhou, the Tibet Autonomous Region, and the prefecture-level city of Chongqing.

On February 6, 2012, the Consulate General was the scene of the Wang Lijun incident.

On July 24, 2020, the Ministry of Foreign Affairs of China informed the US Embassy in China of its decision to withdraw its consent for the establishment and operation of the US Consulate General in Chengdu, in response to the United States government's decision to close the Chinese Consulate General in Houston.

On July 27, 2020, the U.S. Consulate General in Chengdu was closed.

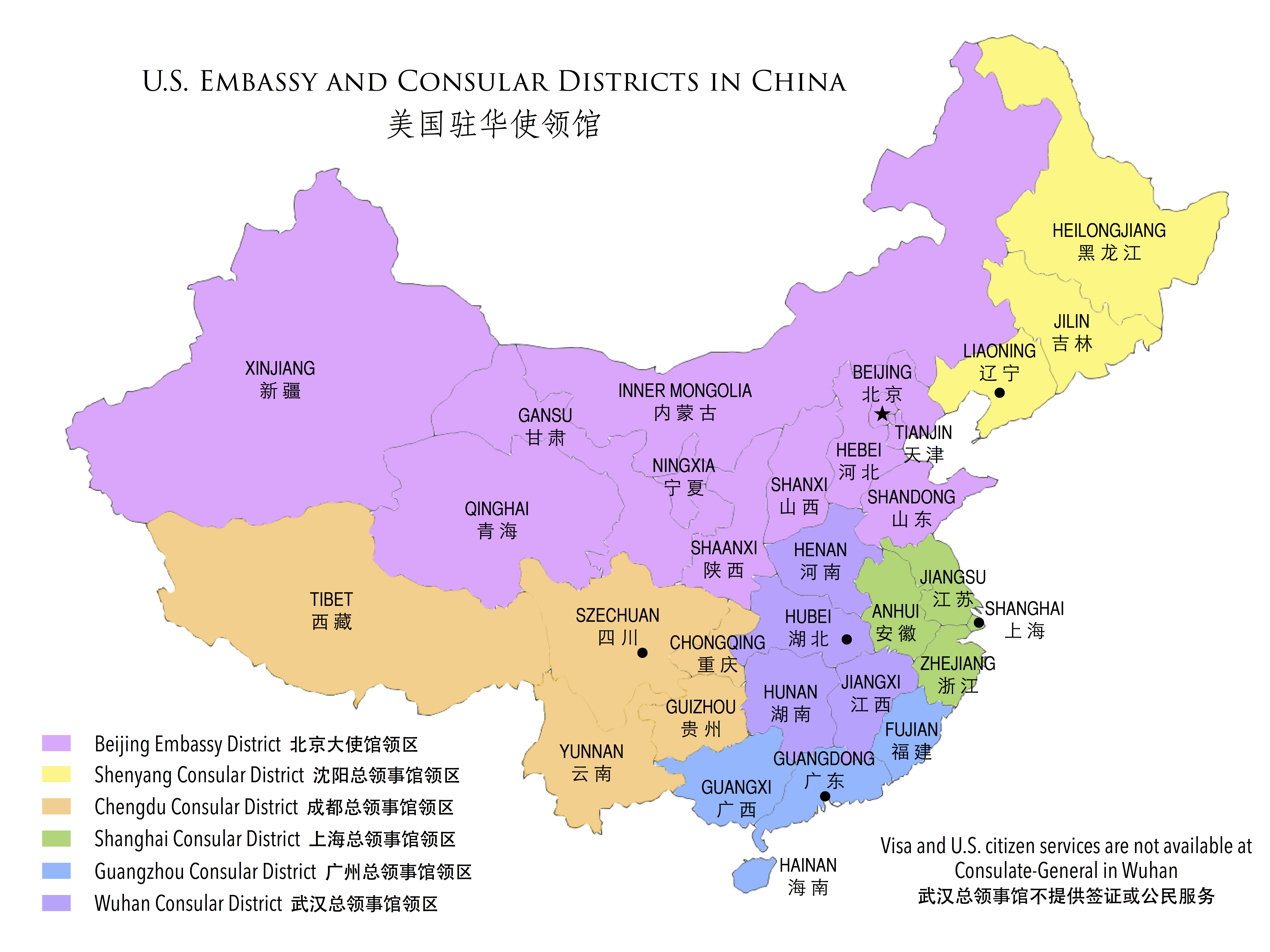
The orange area was the Chengdu consular district

== History ==
The consulate was opened by Vice President George H. W. Bush in 1985 in an annex of the Jinjiang Hotel. The consulate moved in 1993 to its own compound at #4, Lingshiguan Lu, where it remained until its closure.

In 1993, the Peace Corps began a program in China, headquartered in Chengdu. A Peace Corps Director and staff were posted in the city. From its beginning, the primary mission of Peace Corps China has been to assist in the training of young Chinese citizens to become English teachers in the rapidly increasing number of junior high schools of the area, specifically, in the relatively undeveloped provinces of Gansu, Guizhou, and Sichuan, as well as the municipality of Chongqing. There were eighteen teachers in the first group of Peace Corps China Volunteers, and they served in five teacher training institutions. Now, twenty years later, there are about 150 Volunteers teaching in 90 institutions.

The consulate compound came under attack in May 1999 by crowds enraged by the US accidental bombing of the Chinese Embassy in Belgrade. The Consul General's Residence was heavily damaged by fire.

In 2008, Condoleezza Rice was the first US Secretary of State to visit the consulate. She came in response to the massive Sichuan earthquake that killed approximately 80,000 people. Secretary Rice visited a relief camp in Dujiangyan, as well as an emergency water purification project donated by the United States.

In February 2012, a Chinese official entered the US Consulate General in Chengdu, setting off a political scandal that led to the downfall of Chongqing Party Secretary Bo Xilai in what is now known as the Wang Lijun incident.

The Consulate started with only six American officers and approximately 20 local employees. It was made up of an Executive Office (a Consul General and administrative assistant); a small office handling political, economic and commercial issues; a Consular Section; a Management Section, and what was then known as the U.S. Information Service.

In 1985, each of the offices was covered by one American officer. The Consulate today has grown to 130 total staff. Approximately 100 of these are locally hired professional Chinese staff.

On July 24, 2020, China revoked the license for the U.S. General Consulate in Chengdu, and ordered the general consulate to cease operations. This was in retaliation for the closure of the Chinese consulate-general in Houston, Texas, on July 22, 2020.

The consulate was closed at 10:00 AM on July 27, 2020. Afterwards, Chinese authorities entered through the front entrance and took it over.

== Bo Xilai corruption scandal ==
In February 2012, Wang Lijun, the vice-mayor of Chongqing, fled to the Consulate General of the United States in Chengdu, where he remained for around 24 hours, amid rumors of political infighting with Chongqing Communist Party secretary Bo Xilai, sparking off the Wang Lijun incident, which led to Bo's eventual ouster and trial.

== Closure ==
On the morning of July 24, 2020, local time, "the Ministry of Foreign Affairs of China informed the US Embassy in China of its decision to withdraw its consent for the establishment and operation of the US Consulate General in Chengdu. The Ministry also made specific requirements on the ceasing of all operations and events by the Consulate General." The move was a response to the United States government's decision to close its consulate in Houston on grounds of national security. Chinese Foreign Ministry spokesman Wang Wenbin said that some Chengdu consulate personnel were "conducting activities not in line with their identities" and "had harmed China's security interests", but would not elaborate. The White House had urged China earlier in the day to not engage in "tit-for-tat retaliation."

In immediate reaction to the news of the closure, global stock indexes dropped. On July 27, 2020, the national flag of the US was lowered at the Consulate General in Chengdu at 6:18 AM local time by a detachment of US Marine Security Guards assigned with the role of protecting US missions in China.

== Consuls General ==
Historical Consuls General were:

- Jim Mullinax (2017–2020)
- Raymond Greene (2014–2017)
- Peter Haymond (2011–2014)
- David E. Brown (2009–2010)
- James Boughner (2006–2009)
- Jeff Moon (2004–2006)
- David Bleyle (2001–2003)
- Brian Woo (1999–2000)
- Cornelis Keur (1995–1999)
- Donald A. Camp (1992–95)
- Marshall Adair (1990–1992)
- Bill Thomas (1985–1988)

== See also ==
- List of diplomatic missions of the United States
- Embassy of the United States, Beijing
- Consulate General of the United States, Guangzhou
- Consulate General of the United States, Shanghai
- Consulate General of the United States, Shenyang
- Consulate General of the United States, Wuhan
- Consulate General of the United States, Hong Kong and Macau
- Wang Lijun incident
- QSI International School of Chengdu
- Americans in China
