= Mo Bangfu =

Mo Bangfu (莫邦富, Baku Hōfu) (1953-) is a Chinese columnist and economist based in Japan.

Mo taught the Japanese language at Shanghai International Studies University before obtaining his master's and doctoral degree in 1985 in Japan.

Since 1995, he has been serving as a committee member of the program review conference of Tokyo MX. The position was unprecedented for foreigners working in Japanese media, which thus led him to be a person carrying a symbolic importance for Japan's globalization. Since the late 80s, he has been active in Japanese public life and more than 50 books of his in Japanese have been published. He has been an authoritative source introducing China.

The Hong Kong financial magazine Weekly Economy News reported, "Mo BangFu’s name is like a brand to spread Chinese culture that is widely known by the Japanese media and cultural industry, and the local Chinese community".

From April 1999 to March 2002, Mo hosted a special column, "My View of China", on NHK to introduce the historic path and the current outlook of China after the execution of the opening-door policy. His column in the Asahi Shimbun began in 2002 and has been highly regarded by Japanese readers.

From January 2005, "Mo BangFu’s China Business Guide", a special column sponsored by Nikkei Business Publications for the Nihon Keizai Shimbun, started to be aired (). In June 2006, Bangfu launched "Successful Guide – Talk about China Business" on J TOP magazine, the most well-known monthly journal heavily read by financial moguls and decision makers working for the government. In addition, he has series of influential publications online for more than ten years, such as "Mo BangFu’s New China’s Matter", published by the NHK publishing and other media companies.

Every year, Mo BangFu is invited as a public speaker by Japanese regional governments, economy associations, banks, financial groups, airliners, and multinational corporations. He has done more than 100 speeches inside Japan as well as around the world. The audience of his speech includes leaders of the regional government and the financial industry, as well as entrepreneurs.

BangFu was praised as the best investment advisor for Japanese corporations, in the 2004 October issue of magazine The East. "Japan corporations, who want to invest in China, may not need MBA, but they cannot do it without MBF (Mo BangFu)." (Yoshinori Tandou, Toyo University)

Other than the program review conference committee member in MXTV, he held the position of corporate image counselor for OMRON from 2001 to 2005. Since 2003, he has been serving as the only foreigner advisor for "Nippon Keidanren" (Japan Business Federation), the largest economic association in Japan. He also serves as a senior advisor for Hakuhodo, Japan's largest advertising company, and other titles in Japanese society. Since he was invited by Yamanashi Prefecture in July 2007, he has been serving as the only foreigner committee member for the prefecture's Travel Roundtable Panel. Since September 2007, he has been serving as a counselor of the Mitsubishi UFJ Trust and Banking Corporation. Since 2004, he has been hired as an economy counselor for Zhenjiang, Jiangsu, China, and a senior counselor of Free Trade Zone for Qingdao, Shandong, China. Since August 2007, he has been hired as the ambassador of commerce for Luohe, Henan, China.
