= Yinhe incident =

1993 International incident

- Simplified Chinese: 银河号事件
- Traditional Chinese: 銀河號事件
- Literal meaning: 'Milky Way' incident
Transcriptions
Standard Mandarin
- Hanyu Pinyin: Yínhé hào shìjiàn
Yue: Cantonese
- Jyutping: ngan4 ho4 hou6 si6 gin2

The Yinhe incident (Chinese: 银河号事件) occurred in 1993 after the United States government received intelligence that the China-based container ship Yinhe (银河; 'Milky Way') was carrying chemical weapon materials to Iran. The United States Navy forced the surrounding Middle Eastern countries to refuse docking rights to the Yinhe, leaving it in the international waters of the Indian Ocean for twenty-four days. Additionally, the Chinese found that the GPS of the ship was jammed such that the ship could not navigate. Eventually, inspections of the ship's cargo by a joint Saudi–United States team concluded that the cargo ship did not contain any chemical weapons precursors. The United States government stated that there would be no apology, saying "the United States had acted in good faith on intelligence from multiple sources." Some American officials within the Clinton administration later raised the possibility, without any evidence, of China having deliberately spread false intelligence in order to cause the incident, referring to it as a "sting" to embarrass Washington. The incident resulted in an increase of Chinese nationalism and anti-Americanism in China throughout the 1990s.

The Yinhe incident, especially the GPS positioning service denial, was described as "unforgettable humiliation" in Chinese state media and became the immediate cause for the Chinese government's decision to initiate its own navigation satellite system, BeiDou.

== The ship ==
The Yinhe was a Chinese container ship that had a fixed schedule between Tianjin Port and Kuwait. Its scheduled port visits included Shanghai, Hong Kong, Singapore, Jakarta, Dubai and Daman and Diu. The Yinhe belonged to the China Ocean Shipping Corporation (中远集团).

== Timeline ==
In late July 1993, the United States alleged that a Chinese civilian container ship, the Yinhe, was carrying chemical weapon materials (thionyl chloride and thiodiglycol) to Abbas Harbor, Iran, citing a ship's manifest obtained by its Central Intelligence Agency. It stopped the Yinhe. The United States requested that the Yinhe turn back to China in order to unload its alleged cargo, but China refused after conducting an investigation and determining that no chemical weapon precursors were present on the ship. United States military vessels and aircraft followed the Yinhe, disrupting its normal travel route. The United States unilaterally disabled the Yinhe's civilian GPS, causing it lose direction and anchor on the high seas for twenty-four days until it agreed to inspection. The Yinhe experienced shortages of water and fuel.

On August 8, 1993, China publicly announced that the Yinhe was receiving "intrusive surveillance" by American warships in international waters—which American officials stated was a sign that China sought a confrontation—and declared officially that the ship did not carry any chemical weapons materials. The U.S. government dismissed the declaration, and a senior member of the Clinton administration initially stated that while it would be illegal for the United States to board the ship for inspection, the United States would continue efforts to persuade China to recall the ship.

On August 20, 1993, after being stranded for three weeks in international waters, the ship was allowed to "take on fuel and water ... to ensure the safety of the vessel and crew" after repeated requests from the shipping company. A ship registered to the United Arab Emirates brought fresh water, vegetables and fruits.

The ship docked at Dammam, Saudi Arabia on August 27, 1993. The next day, the United States and China agreed to an open inspection of the ship at the port, by a Saudi-United States joint team, after a preliminary boarding by seventeen Chinese and two Saudi officials. The inspection did not find any improper chemicals.

On September 4, the representatives of the Chinese, Saudi and United States governments jointly signed a certification that the ship's cargo did not contain materials related to chemical weapons.

== Aftermath ==
American officials refused to apologize for the incident, instead describing it as "unfortunate." They indicated that they were discussing the issue of whether the United States was obligated to pay compensation to the ship's owner, China Ocean Shipping Corporation. The United States also refused to respond to Chinese demands that US pay compensation for the incident.

The Chinese government demanded a public apology and financial compensation for the incident. When the accusations were reported in China, Chinese nationalism increased in response. The Chinese government attempted to downplay the issue by claiming that the accusation was not the official stance of the American government and did not represent the majority opinion in the United States. During an April 2001 U.S. House hearing, a professor Joseph Fewsmith of the Department of International Relations of Boston University claimed that the Yinhe incident "has been repeatedly cited as a case of international bullying by the United States". Several Asian countries also joined China in condemning the US after the conclusion of the inspection.

After the Yinhe incident, CCP General Secretary Jiang Zemin expressed that China would adopt a diplomatic posture of goodwill and a "sixteen-characters formula" to working with the United States: enhancing confidence, avoiding troubles, expanding cooperation, and avoiding confrontation. Although Jiang was criticized by hardliners and some military officials domestically for the perceived "weak reaction," his accommodating approach helped improve China's relations with the United States.

When reporting on the BeiDou navigation system, Chinese media highlighted how the United States had partially deactivated the GPS navigation service in the sea area where the Yinhe was to impede her navigation, as a reason "to develop an independent 'BeiDou' for China," and also as the reason for "Sun Jiadong and Shen Rongjun, deputy director of the National Defense Science, Technology and Industry Commission, jointly signing a letter to propose the launch of China's satellite navigation project".

According to academics Joseph Yu-shek Cheng and Ngok King Lun, Chinese officials and the public generally considered the Yinhe incident as a demonstration of US hegemonism. This opinion affected the official and public perceptions of the Hainan island incident, which was largely considered as subsequent hegemonic actions by the United States in a similar manner as the Yinhe incident.

Di Hua, research associate at the Stanford Center for International Security and Arms Control, criticized the US response to the incident. According to Di, the chemicals thionyl chloride and thiodiglycol were included in the initial manifest for the Yinhe, but were restricted by Chinese customs. He noted the difficulties in ascertaining the end uses of such chemicals at customs, and argued that the Chinese government did not want to export the chemicals to Iran nor knew that they were being shipped until they intercepted a US intelligence report. Di further argued that US intelligence should have privately notified their Chinese counterparts of the issue, rather than publicly while the ship was in international waters. According to Di, "Washington wanted to disgrace China but wound up disgracing its own intelligence instead."

== See also ==
- China and weapons of mass destruction
- United States bombing of the Chinese embassy in Belgrade
