= United States bombing of the Chinese embassy in Belgrade =

1999 bombing of a diplomatic mission

- Part of the NATO bombing of Yugoslavia
- Bombing location within Belgrade
- Location: 44.8250°N 20.4190°E; Belgrade, Serbia, Yugoslavia
- Date: May 7, 1999; 23:46 CEST
- Target: US claim: Yugoimport headquarters China claim: Embassy of China, Belgrade
- Attack type: Aerial bombing
- Weapon: Five JDAM bombs released from one B-2 Spirit
- Deaths: 3
- Injuries: 27
- Perpetrators: United States Air Force; Central Intelligence Agency; NATO (disputed)
- Motive: Disputed; US claim: unintentional; see allegations of intention

United States bombing of the Chinese embassy in Belgrade
- Simplified Chinese: 五八事件
- Traditional Chinese: 五八事件
- Literal meaning: May 8th incident
Transcriptions
Standard Mandarin
- Hanyu Pinyin: wǔbā shìjiàn
Yue: Cantonese
- Jyutping: ng5 baat3 si6 gin2

On May 7, 1999, a United States Air Force B-2 Spirit, participating in the NATO bombing of Yugoslavia, dropped five Joint Direct Attack Munition satellite-guided bombs on the Embassy of China, Belgrade, FR Yugoslavia, killing three Chinese journalists and injuring twenty-seven others. This incident is known by many in Serbia and in China as the May 8 incident. (Note: Chinese: 五八事件; pinyin: wǔbā shìjiàn; The attack occurred at 23:46 local time on May 7 and 05:46 China Standard Time on May 8.) According to the United States, the intention had been to bomb the headquarters of Yugoslav weapons importer Yugoimport, which existed 440 meters south of the Embassy of China, on the same street. At-the-time President of the United States, Bill Clinton, apologized for the bombing and claimed it was an accident.

The United States of America's Central Intelligence Agency (CIA) director at the time of the bombing, George Tenet, later testified that the embassy bombing was the only one in the campaign organized by the CIA, and that the CIA had "miscalculated" the geopositioning of the Yugoimport's building's coordinates from its address. The Yugoimport building was later also bombed, as the US had originally intended, but the building still remains standing as of 2019. The US claimed its own map and satellite imagery analysis approved the target while failing to identify it as an embassy. Although extensively referenced as a NATO mission and aircraft, all B-2 strikes were targeted and flown under US European Command alone. One CIA officer was fired following an investigation.

The Chinese government declared the bombing a "barbarian act", and rejected the June 17, 1999 final explanation presented by a US delegation, calling it "by no means acceptable to the Chinese Government and people". Anti-US and anti-NATO protests, many tens of thousands strong, swept across China. Crowds outside US and NATO missions in major cities threw rocks and destroyed vehicles, setting alight the US Consul General's residence in Chengdu. No serious injuries occurred. Around the world, Chinese students and diaspora peacefully protested at US embassies.

In October 1999, The Observer and Politiken published a joint investigation concluding that the bombing was deliberate. Believing the embassy was hosting rebroadcasting for the Yugoslav Army, NATO allegedly transferred the embassy from a prohibited target list to a designated target list. The embassy was reportedly collecting measurement and signature intelligence on NATO aircraft and missiles, including the B-2 and F-117A stealth aircraft, and China was allegedly obtaining components from the shootdown of an F-117A in Yugoslavia two months prior. US and UK officials called the newspapers' investigation a fabrication.

In August 1999, the US agreed to pay $4.5 million to the victims and families of the bombing of the Chinese embassy in Serbia. In December 1999, the US compensated China $28 million for damages to the embassy, and China compensated the United States $2.87 million for the damages their protestors caused. In May 2000, the United States–China Relations Act of 2000 paved the way for China's entry into the World Trade Organization. By June 2000, during a visit to China by US Secretary of State Madeleine Albright, both sides said that relations between them had improved.

Most Chinese people continue to believe the attack was deliberate. A 2002 survey of 28 Chinese security experts found 16 respondents believed the bombing was intentional even though fourteen of them did not suspect Clinton's involvement. The bombing prompted the People's Liberation Army to consolidate domestic air defense, develop cyberwarfare and anti-satellite capabilities, and reconsider its nuclear weapons policy. A Chinese Cultural Center was completed on the former Chinese embassy site in Belgrade, Serbia in 2020.

== Sequence of events ==
Victims of the 1999 Chinese embassy in Belgrade bombing: (from left) Xu Xinghu and his wife Zhu Ying, and Shao Yunhuan

In the days before the bombing, an attack folder labelled "Belgrade Warehouse 1" was circulated for command approval. The folder originated within the CIA, and described the target as a warehouse for a Yugoslav government agency suspected of arms proliferation activities. Clinton approved the bombing mission.

It is unclear whether other NATO leaders approved the strike. A report by the French Ministry of Defense after the war said that "part of the military operations were conducted by the United States outside the strict framework of NATO" and that a dual-track command structure existed. NATO had no authority to use any B-2 stealth bomber, which was used to carry out the strike. That the United States was running missions outside of NATO's joint command structure was a source of some contention between the US and other members of NATO, especially France.

According to officials interviewed by The New York Times, the target was checked against a "no-strike" database of locations such as hospitals, churches, and embassies, but this raised no alarm as the embassy was listed at its old address. Officials said a similar list in the UK also had the same error. However, the joint Observer/Politiken investigation reported that a NATO flight controller in Naples said that on this "don't hit" map, the Chinese embassy was listed at its correct location. The investigation also reported that the coordinates of the Chinese embassy were correctly listed in a NATO computer.

At 23:46 CEST on the night of May 7, the strike was carried out by a single B-2 bomber with a crew of two of the United States Air Force's 509th Bomb Wing flying directly out of Whiteman AFB, Missouri. The bomber was armed with Mark 84 2,000-pound bombs, armed with JDAM GPS guidance precision kits. The weapons were accurate to 13 m (14 yd). However, the geographic coordinates provided by the CIA and programmed into the bombs were those of the Chinese embassy 440 m (480 yd) to the north. At around midnight local time, five bombs landed at different points on the embassy complex. The embassy had taken precautionary measures in view of the ongoing bombing campaign, sending staff home and housing others in the basement, but the attack still resulted in three fatalities: Shao Yunhuan (邵云环) who worked for the Xinhua News Agency, Xu Xinghu (许杏虎) and his wife Zhu Ying (朱颖) who worked for Guangming Daily, both Chinese state media, in addition to at least 20 people being injured. American officials said that some or all of the three who were killed were actually intelligence agents, but the Chinese denied the claim.

== Chinese reaction ==
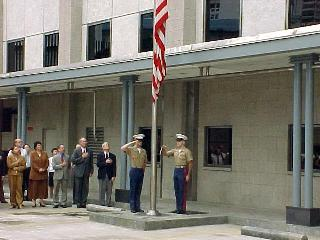
On May 12, to mourn the deaths of the bombing victims, American flags were ordered to be lowered to half-staff at US diplomatic missions in mainland China and Hong Kong. The photo above shows the lowered American flag at the American consulate in Hong Kong. "The lives of those killed and injured was secondary to the escalating tensions between the two powers," states a study of the diplomatic exchanges surrounding the affair. "US officials to the families of the deceased were only incidental and, at best, pro-forma."

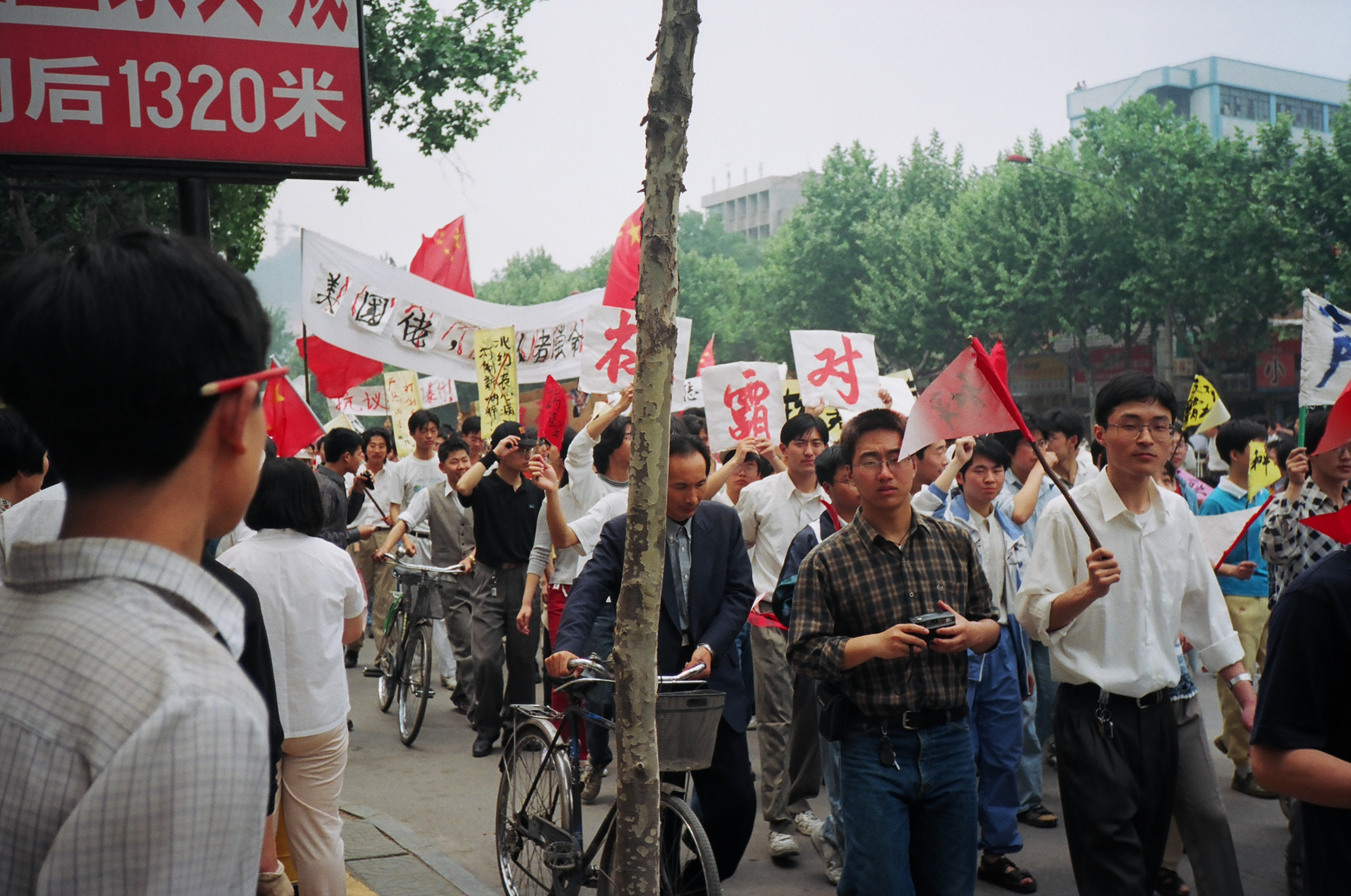
An anti-American protest in Nanjing

=== Government reaction ===
The bombing drew outrage from the Chinese government. An official statement on Chinese television denounced what it called a "barbaric attack and a gross violation of Chinese sovereignty". China's ambassador to the UN described what he called "NATO's barbarian act" as "a gross violation of the United Nations charter, international law and the norms governing international relations" and "a violation of the Geneva convention".

At an emergency CCP Politburo meeting after the bombing, CCP General Secretary Jiang Zemin stated, "I am shocked and indignant. This event is not a trivial matter; it is absolutely critical" and that "the Chinese people cannot be bullied!" Jiang also said that had Mao Zedong and Zhou Enlai not led China to develop nuclear weapons and satellites, "I fear we would have been attacked earlier on."

On May 12, 1999, the Legislative Council of Hong Kong passed the "Condemnation of NATO" motion in a rare 54–0 bipartisan vote.

On May 12, 1999, in his first public statement since the embassy bombing, Premier of China Zhu Rongji called NATO "hypocrites" and stated that the "idea of safeguarding human rights and democracy, as well as opposing ethnic cleansing which they [NATO] are chanting loudly, is only a fig leaf." He also called on the United States and NATO "to make an open and official apology to the Chinese government and the Chinese people."

President Clinton's apologies and those of the US State Department were not initially broadcast by Chinese state-run media outlets. The demonstrations continued for four days before the Chinese government called a halt, eventually broadcasting President Clinton's apology on television and ordering the police to restrain the demonstrators.

For a week, General Secretary of the Chinese Communist Party Jiang Zemin declined phone calls from President Bill Clinton, eventually accepting a 30-minute apology call on May 14, in which Clinton expressed "regret" over the incident. Jiang had chosen to leave US-China leadership communications channels unused as he waited for the Politburo Standing Committee to reach a consensus. The time it took for the Politburo to gather necessary information and reach a decision about China's responses motivated Party leadership to revisit a proposal to establish a centralized National Security Commission, although this was ultimately not implemented at the time.

In the aftermath of the American bombing, the Chinese government ordered media outlets not to criticize the American president further and the Communist Party directed to the media to report on the United States in a less hostile manner. Generally, these limitations frustrated Chinese journalists.

=== Public reaction ===
Large and often violent anti-US and anti-NATO protests erupted across China, targeting the consular offices of the United States and other NATO countries. Large-scale protests at US offices in Beijing, Shanghai, Guangzhou, Chengdu, and Shenyang forced their temporary closure. Further protests occurred in Nanjing, Lanzhou, Hong Kong and the Portuguese territory of Macau, seven months prior to its handover to China. Student slogans included "don't take TOEFL, don't take GRE, fight wholeheartedly the American Empire".

Western media accused Chinese media of fueling the protests, pointing to its initial lack of reporting on the US apologies, and rhetoric such as a People's Daily article saying NATO had intentionally "spilled Chinese blood".

The protests continued for several days, during which tens of thousands of rock-throwing protesters kept US Ambassador James Sasser and other staff trapped in the Beijing embassy. The residence of the US Consul in Chengdu was damaged by fire, but there were no reported injuries. The Albanian embassy in Beijing was also attacked.

On May 9, 1999, then Vice President Hu Jintao delivered a national televised speech calling the act both "criminal" and "barbaric" and that it "has greatly infuriated the Chinese people." He said the unauthorized demonstrations in Beijing, Shanghai, Guangzhou, Chengdu and Shenyang reflected the anger and patriotism of the Chinese people, and which the Chinese government fully supported, but urged against extreme and illegal conduct.

=== Settlement ===
By the end of 1999, relations began to gradually improve. In August, the US government made a "voluntary humanitarian payment" of $4.5 million to the families of the three Chinese nationals who were killed and to those who were injured. On December 16, 1999, the two governments reached a settlement under which the United States agreed to pay $28 million in compensation for damage to the Chinese Embassy facility, and China agreed to pay $2.87 million in compensation for damage inflicted to the US Embassy and other diplomatic facilities in China.

Technically, although the $4.5 million paid to the victims and their families came from Department of Defense discretionary funds, the $28 million for the damage to the embassy needed to be appropriated by the United States Congress; China would receive $28m in compensation from the US for the bombing, but had to give back close to $3m for the damage to US diplomatic property in Beijing and elsewhere. The US paid another $4.5m to the families of the dead and injured.

== Official investigation and reporting in the aftermath ==
Late on May 8, US Defense Secretary William Cohen and George Tenet issued a joint press release stating neither the aircrew involved nor the equipment were to blame for the incident. The first attempt to explain the bombing came on May 10. William Cohen told reporters "In simple terms, one of our planes attacked the wrong target because the bombing instructions were based on an outdated map". The statement made no mention of the CIA. It was subsequently revealed that the CIA possessed maps showing the embassy.

While US officials then began, on the record, to deflect questions pending the outcome of further enquiries, they continued to brief journalists off the record. For example, also on May 10, Eric Schmitt published an account with most of the elements that were to feature in Director of Central Intelligence (DCI) Tenet's later admissions. Schmitt reported that from the grainy aerial photographs that were used the two buildings looked very similar in terms of size, shape and height, and that the distance between them is about 200 yards (180 m).

Media criticism focused on the National Imagery and Mapping Agency (NIMA) which made an announcement stating that "recent news reports regarding the accuracy of NIMA maps have been inaccurate or incomplete" and that "a hard-copy map is neither intended, nor used, as the sole source for target identification and approval." CIA Director George Tenet later acknowledged that the map used should never have been used for aerial bombing target selection.

=== Official State Department account ===
In June, Under Secretary of State Thomas Pickering led a delegation to China to present the US version of events.

According to the official account, CIA analysts knew the address of the Yugoimport office to be Bulevar Umetnosti 2 (2 Boulevard of the Arts). Using this information, they attempted to pinpoint its geographic location by using the known locations and addresses of other buildings on parallel streets as reference points. (The New York Times reported that some referred to what was done as "resection and intersection" (Note: In activities such as surveying and inshore marine navigation intersection refers to finding one's current location by taking bearings from known locations. For example, while in a boat finding the bearing of a lighthouse, and other locations known on a map to find where one is on the water. Resection refers to finding the location of an unknown distant point by taking bearings to it from known locations. One bearing determines a line, and two bearings determine two lines which then intersect at a point. A third bearing can be taken which ought to intersect at or very close to where the first two lines intersect. See Position resection and intersection. However, generally speaking, these terms refer to the use of bearings rather than street addresses.) although Pickering did not use those terms in the statement.)

Parallel lines were drawn from known addresses and locations on a parallel street. With this information, it was attempted to reconstruct the pattern of street addresses on Bulevar Umetnosti, which was information unknown to the targeteers. The pattern of street addresses on Bulevar Umetnosti was not as expected, and the targeteer erroneously pinpointed the embassy "located on a small side street at some distance on Bulevar Umetnosti" from the intended target.

Multiple checks designed to prevent attacks on sensitive targets each failed as the location of the embassy had not been updated since the embassy moved to New Belgrade three years earlier. As a result, the bombers took to the air with the coordinates of the Chinese embassy programmed into the bombs on board.

Pickering said that they found no evidence that the embassy was being used to assist Serbian forces, and said that it is not conceivable that any rogue group within the US would have done such a thing. He said that, "Science has taught us that a direct explanation, backed up by full knowledge of facts obtained through a careful investigation, is always preferable to speculation and far fetched, convoluted or contrived theories with little or no factual backing."

=== George Tenet's statement ===
On July 22, George Tenet made a statement before a public hearing of the House Intelligence Committee. Covering the same ground as Under Sec. Pickering's statement in China, he additionally acknowledged the target package originated within the CIA and that it was the sole CIA-directed strike of the war, stated that he had been personally unaware that the CIA was circulating strike requests and recognized that the CIA possessed maps correctly displaying the embassy. Deputy Defense Secretary John Hamre, giving evidence the same day, stated that "NIMA is not at fault".

=== Repercussions for CIA employees responsible ===
Tenet reprimanded six CIA officers and fired one as a result of the investigation. A source told Foreign Policy that this fired employee was William Bennett.

=== Chinese reaction ===
Few Chinese politicians believed the US version of events, believing instead that the strike had been deliberate. Former Ambassador Li Daoyu stated "we don't say it was a decision of Clinton or the White House", but the Chinese government describes the US explanation for "the so-called mistaken bombing" as "anything but convincing" and has never accepted the US version of events. A 2002 survey of 28 Chinese security experts found 16 respondents believed the bombing was intentional, and of the latter sixteen, fourteen did not suspect Clinton's involvement.

The bombing left a toxic legacy on China-NATO relations and kept them frozen for years. In a 2011 meeting with US officials in the aftermath of the 2011 NATO attack in Pakistan, Chinese general Ma Xiaotian directly referred to the embassy bombing by asking "Were you using the wrong maps again?" Observers immediately noted the "cutting" nature of the remark, describing it as "jibing" and "priceless".

== Allegations of intention ==
=== Yugoslav forces in the embassy ===
==== The Observer/Politiken report ====
On October 17, 1999, The Observer (Note: Note that the story actually appears on The Guardian's website (www.theguardian.com). The Observer is published on Sundays and The Guardian is published daily and both are sister publications owned by Guardian Media Group.) published an article by John Sweeney, Jens Holsoe and Ed Vulliamy stating that the bombing was deliberate. On the same day, Copenhagen-based publication Politiken published a similar story in Danish saying that the bombing was deliberate, claiming the Chinese were helping the Yugoslavian forces who were engaged in ethnic cleansing and war crimes in Kosovo.

On November 28, 1999, The Observer published a follow-up piece stating that the Americans bombed the embassy due to allegations that the Chinese were helping Željko Ražnatović, a Serbian mobster, paramilitary leader, and indicted war criminal.

In the Politiken story, a source within the British Ministry of Defense is quoted as saying that the Chinese gave permission to the Yugoslavian army to use the embassy as a communications base. The British source stated the normal practice in this case would be to contact the Chinese and to ask them to stop the activity due to its violation of the Vienna Convention on Diplomatic Relations, and that they assumed that happened but did not have specific knowledge on it. Politiken also reported that British sources surmised that the Chinese did not believe NATO would dare strike the embassy.

The stories drew from anonymous sources, although in instances overall position in the hierarchy, role, and location was mentioned. One non-anonymous source was Dusan Janjic, an academic and advocate for ethnic reconciliation in Yugoslavia who testified that the military attaché at the embassy, Ren Baokai, openly spoke to him about how China was spying on the US

Madeleine Albright, US Secretary of State at the time, called the story that the bombing was deliberate "balderdash", and Robin Cook, British Foreign Secretary at the time, said, "I know not a single shred of evidence to support this rather wild story." The Chinese ambassador to Yugoslavia at the time, Pan Zhanlin, denied in a book that the embassy was being used for rebroadcasting by Yugoslavian forces.

==== Fairness & Accuracy In Reporting (FAIR) posts on lack of US media coverage ====
On October 22, 1999, media critique group Fairness & Accuracy In Reporting (FAIR) posted on the lack of US media coverage of The Observer/Politiken report and called on its supporters to contact major newspapers to ask why it was not being covered.

Andrew Rosenthal of The New York Times responded along with Douglas Stanglin of USA Today, and FAIR summarized the exchanges in a post on November 3, 1999. Rosenthal agreed that coverage should not have referred to the bombing as accidental when this was disputed; however, he said that the stories were not well sourced by their standards. He said that reporters were assigned to look into the matter, but that they were not yet ready to publish (about six months later, in April 2000, they did publish the results of an investigation, and it found no evidence that the bombing was deliberate). In the post, and in response to Rosenthal, FAIR listed the various anonymous sources in terms of general position in the command hierarchy, location, and role and said that if they had come forward publicly they could have been court martialed. FAIR also argued that the report is consistent with other information known about the bombing such as where the bombs hit the embassy, and also pointed out that The Observer/Politiken report was more widely covered internationally than in the US

==== The Sunday Times report of an unpublished memoir by Jiang Zemin ====
In February 2011, The Sunday Times published an article stating that an unpublished memoir by former Chinese leader Jiang Zemin recounts how Serbian forces were allowed to use the Chinese embassy, and that privately, the US showed evidence of this activity to the Chinese.

=== Potential targeting of the nearby Hotel Yugoslavia ===
A 2000 Salon article by Laura Rozen featured an interview of Washington Post columnist and former intelligence officer William M. Arkin, who stated his belief that the bombing was accidental. Rozen reported that the Chinese embassy and the Hotel Yugoslavia are across the street from each other, and that in the Hotel Yugoslavia, Željko Ražnatović owned a casino and had a headquarters. Both the Hotel Yugoslavia and the Chinese embassy were bombed the same night of May 7.

Arkin told Rozen his belief that certain people at NATO erroneously believed that signals coming from the Hotel Yugoslavia were actually coming from the Chinese embassy saying, "I think there were communications emanating from the Hotel Yugoslavia across the street. And I think that stupid people who are leaking rumors to The Observer have made that mistake."

=== Chinese intelligence collection from the embassy ===
US officials told the New York Times that, following the bombing, they learned the embassy was China's most significant intelligence collection platform in Europe. Jens Holsøe, the journalist who wrote the Politiken article, said he directly witnessed Yugoslav military vehicles enter the Chinese embassy compound.

On 24 March 1999, ten weeks prior to the bombing, a Yugoslav Army unit successfully shot down a USAF F-117 Nighthawk, the first ever downing of a stealth aircraft. The article from The Observer in October 1999 reported that a stealth fighter had been shot down early in the air campaign and that since China lacked stealth technology, they may have been glad to trade with the Yugoslav forces. In January 2011, the Associated Press via Fox News reported that the unveiled Chinese J-20 may have been developed in part by reverse-engineering the US F-117 from parts of the wreckage that were recovered.

In May 2019, BBC News reported that, "It's widely assumed that China did get hold of pieces of the plane to study its technology." There was speculation that China had been testing, from the embassy, air defence systems, including countering the stealth technology of the US F-117 and B-2 Spirit aircraft flying over Belgrade. Serbian academic Dusan Janjic reported a conversation with the embassy's military attache Ren Baokai, who was surprisingly open that China was tracking US and NATO operations, cruise missiles, and aircraft from the embassy. Ren was in the embassy during the attack and found in a coma in the basement the next morning. He was transferred to hospital in China, where he recovered and was later given the rank of general. In 2019, he was retired, and declined an interview with the BBC.

== International Criminal Tribunal for the former Yugoslavia (ICTY) investigation ==
A report conducted by the ICTY entitled "Final Report to the Prosecutor by the Committee Established to Review the NATO Bombing Campaign Against the Federal Republic of Yugoslavia" after the Kosovo War examined the attack on the Chinese embassy specifically and came to the conclusion that the Office of the Prosecutor should not undertake an investigation concerning the bombing. In reaching its decision, it provided the following observations:

- That the root of the failures in target location appears to stem from the land navigation techniques employed by an intelligence officer in an effort to pinpoint the location of the Yugoimport FDSP building at Bulevar Umetnosti 2. The officer used techniques known as "intersection" and "resection" which, while appropriate to locate distant or inaccessible points or objects, are inappropriate for use in aerial targeting as they provide only an approximate location. Using this process, the individual mistakenly determined that the Chinese Embassy was the Yugoimport FDSP headquarters.
- The United States has formally apologized to the Chinese Government and agreed to pay $28 million in compensation to the Chinese Government and $4.5 million to the families of those killed or injured. The CIA has also dismissed one intelligence officer and reprimanded six senior managers. The US government also claims to have taken corrective actions in order to assign individual responsibility and to prevent mistakes such as this from occurring in the future.
- The aircrew involved in the attack should not be assigned any responsibility for the fact they were given the wrong target and that it is inappropriate to attempt to assign criminal responsibility for the incident to senior leaders because they were provided with wrong information by officials of another agency.

== Amnesty International report ==
Amnesty International examined the NATO air campaign and assessed the legality of its actions. In the case of the embassy bombing, Amnesty reported both on the official explanation and to the Observer/Politiken investigation without arbitrating as to which was true. NATO was criticized for continuing its bombing campaign uninterrupted when its safeguards to protect civilians were known to be faulty. A genuinely accidental attack would not imply legal responsibility, but the report stated that "the very basic information needed to prevent this mistake was publicly and widely available at the time" and that, "It would appear that NATO failed to take the necessary precautions required by Article 57(2) of Protocol I." Article 57(2) of Protocol I of the Geneva Conventions says that an attacker shall, "do everything feasible to verify that the objectives to be attacked are neither civilians nor civilian objects."

== Aftermath ==
=== Future of the location ===
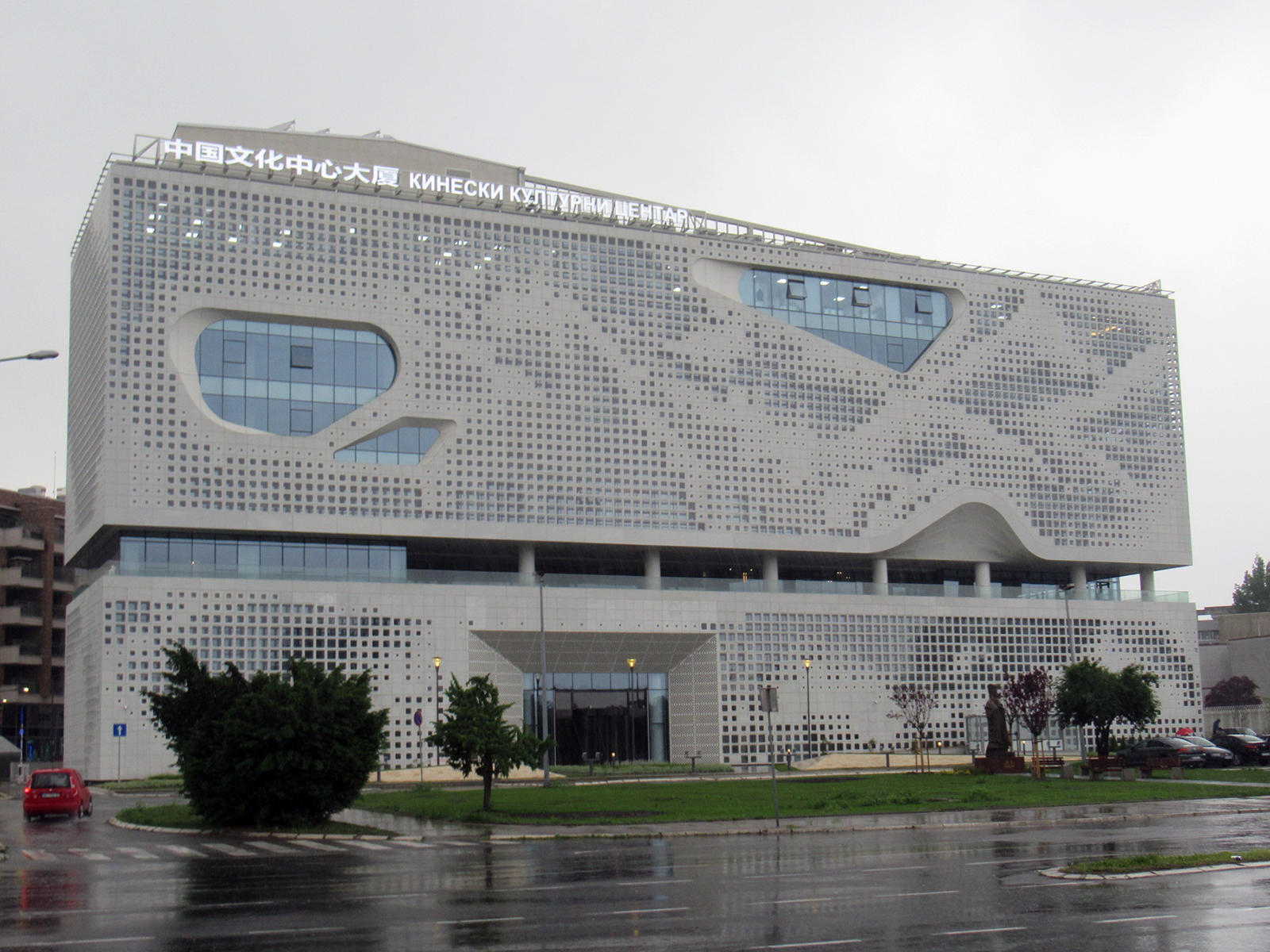
The Chinese Cultural Center in Belgrade was built on the site of the former embassy.

Marking the 10th anniversary of the bombing on May 7, 2009, Belgrade Mayor Dragan Đilas and Chinese Ambassador to Serbia Wei Jinghua dedicated a commemorative plaque at the location. The author of the plaque was Nikola Kolja Milunović. Wreaths were laid at the plaque on May 7, 2017, and also in September 2019.

During the visit of General Secretary of the Chinese Communist Party Xi Jinping to Serbia in June 2016, he and Serbian President Tomislav Nikolić visited the location, declared the nearby turnaround a Square of Serbian-Chinese Friendship and announced the construction of the Chinese Cultural Center on the location of the former embassy. The construction of the center began on July 20, 2017, in the presence of Mayor Siniša Mali and Chinese Ambassador Li Manchang. The center will have ten floors, two below ground and eight above, with a total floor area measuring 32,000 m^{2} (340,000 sq ft). The project will cost 45 million euros. Construction was completed in 2020. A statue of the Chinese philosopher Confucius was installed outside, and that section of the street was renamed to Confucius Street.

In 2020, the Milunović plaque was replaced by a new, "modest" square memorial. While the inscription on the original plaque explained why it had been placed there and included the date of the bombing and number of victims, the new one has a generic text in Serbian and Chinese: As a token of gratitude to PR China for support and friendship in hardest moments for the people of the Republic of Serbia, and in memory of the killed. This sparked objections by the Belgraders, who called the new memorial "a shame" and a "table which says nothing", asking for the reinstatement of the old plaque.

=== China-Serbia relations ===
In advance of a state visit to Serbia overlapping the 25th anniversary of the bombing, CCP General Secretary Xi Jinping wrote an article in the Serbian newspaper Politika in which he stated, "The friendship between China and Serbia which is soaked in blood that the two peoples spilled together has become a joint memory of the two peoples and will encourage both parties to make together huge steps forward."

=== Rise of anti-Western sentiment and warming of China-Russia relations ===
Within the United Nations, both China and Russia opposed military action against Yugoslavia. Strong cultural ties exist between Russia and Serbia, and the bombing campaign, along with the bombing of the Chinese embassy, led to an increase in anti-Western sentiment in both countries and a warming of China-Russia relations.

=== People's Liberation Army reforms ===
Political science scholar Fiona Cunningham has argued that the bombing was a key event in shaping the modern People's Liberation Army. The NATO campaign had already alarmed Chinese leaders, fearing that its lack of United Nations Security Council approval, recognition of a breakaway state, and humanitarian justifications, could all be used in a potential conflict against China over Taiwan, Xinjiang, or Tibet. China's military establishment searched for ways to increase its strategic threats against the United States, including the development of precision conventional missiles, and offensive cyberwarfare operations. The PLA also recognized the importance of space-based military infrastructure to the US bombing, leading it to develop a number of anti-satellite weapons. The PLA's cyber and space capabilities were consolidated into the People's Liberation Army Strategic Support Force in 2015. It also triggered some debate around potential changes to China's nuclear no first use policy, but this remained unchanged. Academic Hui Zhang has argued that, along with the 1995–1996 Third Taiwan Strait Crisis, the 1999 Cox Report, and the 2001 Hainan Island incident, the bombing caused China reinvest in and reorient its nuclear weapons.

== See also ==
- Civilian casualties during Operation Allied Force
- Yinhe incident
