= Emerging power =

Nation or block with steadily rising influence in world affairs

Euler diagram of some international coalitions (BASIC, BRICS, G5 and IBAS/IBSA) of some emerging powers (Brazil, China, India, Russia and South Africa) plus Mexico

An emerging power or rising power is a sovereign state or union of states with significant rising influence in global affairs. Such a power aspires to have a more powerful position or role in international relations, either regionally or globally, and possess sufficient resources and levels of development that such goals are potentially achievable.

== Characteristics ==
There are few available conceptualizations of the term "emerging power". Therefore, there is no standard or agreed method to decide which states are emerging powers. However, a fundamental characteristic of an emerging power is that it is also an emerging economy, being that economic development is necessary and preliminary to political and military emergence. It has been argued that while a country may be an emerging power, it is above anything else an emerging economy with only the potential or hope of increasing their global influence. This is because of several limiting factors, largely the seven dimensions of state power: geography, population, economy, resources, military, diplomacy, and national identity. Traditionally, only great powers or superpowers have succeeded in all seven dimensions of state power.

The BRICS are often cited as being emerging powers, but at varying stages of development and of varying degrees of potential. For example, Russia, once a superpower, is debated as either a resurgent or declining power. China and India are emerging as potential superpowers, while Brazil is emerging as a possible great power.

== List of emerging powers ==
The term emerging power is often used to delineate the following G20 BRICS countries:
Advanced economies and/or developed countries of the G20 major economies

- Australia
- South Korea

Emerging markets and/or developing countries of BRICS

- Brazil
- China
- Egypt
- Ethiopia
- India
- Indonesia
- Iran
- Russia
- South Africa
- United Arab Emirates

Emerging markets and/or developing countries of G20 non BRICS

- Argentina
- Mexico
- Saudi Arabia
- Turkey

Although there is no exact and agreed upon definition of what constitutes an emerging power, the term has sometimes been also applied to the following other countries:

- Algeria
- Colombia
- Malaysia
- Nigeria
- Pakistan
- Philippines
- Poland
- Thailand
- Vietnam

== See also ==
- Middle power
- Multipolar world
- Global Swing States
- MINT (economics)
- G20
- G4 nations
- Asian Century
- New world order (politics)
- Post-9/11
- Post–Cold War era
- Post-Western era
- American Century
- British Century
- Chinese Century
- Indian Century
