= Pacific Century (disambiguation) =

The Pacific Century is a term describing a potential 21st-century dominance of Pacific Rim countries.

Pacific Century may also refer to:

- The Pacific Century, a 1992 documentary series
- Pacific Century Cyberworks, an information and communication technology company
- Pacific Century Motors, an automotive company

== See also ==
- Asian Century
