= Asia-Pacific =

Major geopolitical and economic region

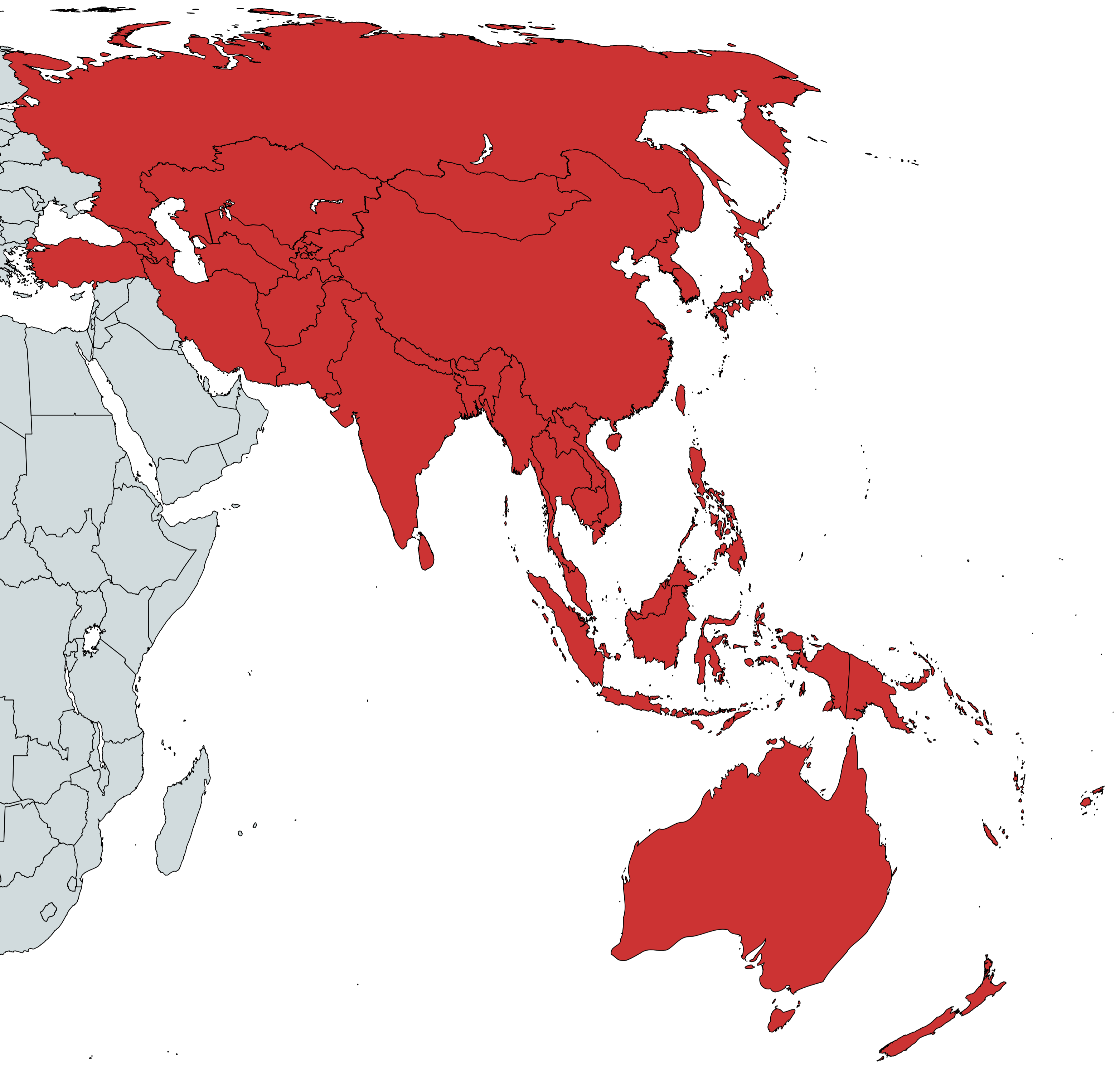
Asia and the Pacific region, according to the United Nations Economic and Social Commission for Asia and the Pacific (ESCAP)

The Asia-Pacific (APAC) is a major geopolitical and economic region of the world adjoining the western Pacific Ocean, Indian Ocean and comprising the part of the Old World located outside the EMEA region. The region's precise boundaries vary depending on context, but countries and territories in the Far East (East Asia, South Asia, Southeast Asia and Oceania) are also sometimes included. In a wider context, even countries and territories in North Asia and Central Asia and the Pacific-adjoining countries in the Americas can be included. For example, the Asia-Pacific Economic Cooperation (APEC) includes five economies (Canada, Chile, Mexico, Peru, and the United States) in the New World (more standardly referred to as the Western Hemisphere). The term has become popular since the late 1980s in commerce, finance, and politics. Despite the heterogeneity of the regions' economies, most individual nations within the zone are emerging markets experiencing significant growth. Sometimes, the notion of "Asia-Pacific excluding Japan" (APEJ) is considered useful.

== Related regions ==
- East Asia
- Oceania
- Southeast Asia
- South Asia

== List of countries and territories by subregion ==
In accordance with the United Nations Economic and Social Commission for Asia and the Pacific (ESCAP), the Asia-Pacific region comprises a total of 51 countries and seven territories grouped into five subregions, including five transregional countries which can also be considered parts of the EMEA region.

=== Traditional definition ===
- East Asia
  - China (Mainland)
  - Hong Kong
  - Japan
  - North Korea
  - South Korea
  - Taiwan
  - Macau
  - Mongolia
- South Asia
  - Afghanistan
  - Bangladesh
  - Bhutan
  - India
  - Maldives
  - Nepal
  - Pakistan
  - Sri Lanka
- Southeast Asia
  - Brunei
  - Cambodia
  - Indonesia
  - Laos
  - Malaysia
  - Myanmar
  - Philippines
  - Singapore
  - Thailand
  - Timor-Leste
  - Vietnam
- Oceania
  - American Samoa (United States)
  - Australia
  - Cook Islands
  - Fiji
  - French Polynesia (France)
  - Guam (United States)
  - Kiribati
  - Marshall Islands
  - Micronesia (Federated States of)
  - Nauru
  - New Caledonia (France)
  - New Zealand
  - Niue
  - Northern Mariana Islands (United States)
  - Palau
  - Papua New Guinea
  - Samoa
  - Solomon Islands
  - Tonga
  - Tuvalu
  - Vanuatu

=== Additional countries and territories by continent ===
In a wider context, the Asia-Pacific region can also comprise the following 31 countries and 12 territories, including two transregional countries which can be considered parts of the EMEA region too.

- Asia
  - Abkhazia (Note: Transregional country, it can also be included in the EMEA region.)
  - Akrotiri and Dhekelia (United Kingdom)
  - Bahrain
  - Cyprus
  - Iran
  - Iraq
  - Israel
  - Jordan
  - Kazakhstan
  - Kuwait
  - Kyrgyzstan
  - Lebanon
  - Northern Cyprus
  - Oman
  - Palestine
    - Gaza Strip
    - West Bank
  - Qatar
  - Russia
  - Saudi Arabia
  - South Ossetia (Alania)
  - Syria
  - Tajikistan
  - Turkmenistan
  - United Arab Emirates
  - Uzbekistan
  - Yemen
- Oceania
  - Ashmore and Cartier Islands (Australia)
  - Christmas Island (Australia)
  - Cocos (Keeling) Islands (Australia)
  - Coral Sea Islands (Australia)
  - Heard Island and McDonald Islands (Australia)
  - Norfolk Island (Australia)
  - Pitcairn Islands (United Kingdom)
  - Tokelau (New Zealand)
  - United States Minor Outlying Islands (United States)
    - Baker Island
    - Howland Island
    - Jarvis Island
    - Johnston Atoll
    - Kingman Reef
    - Midway Atoll
    - Palmyra Atoll
    - Wake Island
  - Wallis and Futuna (France)

== Economic overview ==
The World Bank's April 2024 update indicates that the growth rate for the Asia-Pacific region, excluding China, is expected to slightly increase to 4.6% in 2024, up from 4.4% in 2023. This underscores a diverse economic resilience against global pressures. Meanwhile, global trade growth, which was minimal at 0.2% in 2023, is projected to improve to 2.3% in 2024, crucial for the region's export-oriented economies. However, private investment remains below pre-pandemic levels due to higher debt levels and rising interest rates, signaling a cautious investment climate. The region faces significant challenges from both external factors, such as high core inflation and modest global trade recovery, and domestic issues like increased debt and political uncertainties, potentially hindering economic growth. Additionally, a hypothetical 1% decline in GDP growth in the US or China could reduce GDP growth in other developing Asia-Pacific economies by approximately 0.5% and 0.3%, respectively. The increase in trade-distorting measures, which have tripled since 2019 among G-20 countries, reflects a trend towards protective industrial policies, although other eastern Asia-Pacific countries, except for China and Indonesia, have been less involved in these measures.

== See also ==
- Americas
- Asia-Pacific Economic Cooperation (APEC)
- Asia Pacific Forum
- Asia Pacific Foundation of Canada
- Asia-Pacific Network Information Centre (APNIC)
- Asia Society
- Asian Century
- China Rim
- East Asia Summit
- East-West dichotomy
- Europe, the Middle East and Africa (EMEA)
- Free and Open Indo-Pacific
- Group of Asia and the Pacific Small Island Developing States
- Indo-Pacific
- List of country groupings (including AMEA and AMER)
- Oceania
- Pacific Century
- Pivot to Asia
- South Asian Association for Regional Cooperation (SAARC)
- Valeriepieris circle
