= Rosemary Foot =

Rosemary Foot is the name of:

- Rosemary Foot (politician) (born 1936), former member of the New South Wales Legislative Assembly
- Rosemary Foot (academic), academic writer
