= Chinese Century =

Idea that China may dominate the 21st century

- Traditional Chinese: 中國世紀
- Simplified Chinese: 中国世纪
Transcriptions
Standard Mandarin
- Hanyu Pinyin: Zhōngguó shìjì

Flag of the People's Republic of China

The Chinese Century is a neologism suggesting that the 21st century may be geoeconomically and/or geopolitically dominated by the People's Republic of China, similar to how the "American Century" refers to the 20th century and the "British Century" to the 19th. Related terms are "China's rise" or "China's peaceful rise." Inside China, the slogan "great rejuvenation of the Chinese nation," coined by Jiang Zemin, is more often used.

China created the Belt and Road Initiative, which, according to analysts, has been a geostrategic effort to take a larger role in global affairs and challenge American postwar hegemony. It has also been argued that China co-founded the Asian Infrastructure Investment Bank and New Development Bank to compete with the World Bank and the International Monetary Fund in development finance. In 2015, China launched the Made in China 2025 strategic plan to further develop its manufacturing sector.

China's large working population has contributed to its rise as a global power. However, the population in China is aging faster than almost any other country in history. Current demographic trends could hinder economic growth, create challenging social problems, and limit China's capabilities to act as a new global hegemon.

According to The Economist, on a purchasing-power-parity (PPP) basis, the Chinese economy became the world's largest in 2013. On a foreign exchange rate basis, some estimates in 2020 and early 2021 have determined that China could overtake the U.S. in 2028, or 2026 if the Chinese currency further strengthened. As of July 2021, Bloomberg L.P. analysts estimated that China may either overtake the U.S. to become the world's biggest economy in the 2030s or never be able to reach such a goal. Some scholars believe that China's rise has peaked and that an impending stagnation or decline may follow.

== Debates and factors ==
GDP (current US$, not adjusted for purchasing power parity) – United States, China (in trillions of US$, 1960–2019)

Nominal GDP per capita (not adjusted for purchasing power parity) – United States, China (1960–2019)

China's economy was estimated to be the largest in the 16th, 17th and early 18th century. Joseph Stiglitz said the "Chinese Century" had begun in 2014. The Economist has argued that "the Chinese Century is well under way", citing China's GDP since 2013, if calculated on a purchasing-power-parity basis.

From 2013, China created the Belt and Road Initiative, with future investments of almost $1 trillion which according to analysts has been a geostrategic push for taking a larger role in global affairs. It has also been argued that China co-founded the Asian Infrastructure Investment Bank and New Development Bank to compete with the World Bank and the International Monetary Fund in development finance. In 2015, China launched the Made in China 2025 strategic plan to further develop the manufacturing sector, with the aim of upgrading the manufacturing capabilities of Chinese industries and growing from labor-intensive workshops into a more technology-intensive powerhouse.

In November 2020, China signed the Regional Comprehensive Economic Partnership as a free trade agreement in counter to the Trans-Pacific Partnership. The deal has been considered by some commentators as a "huge victory" for China, although it has been shown that it would add just 0.08% to China's 2030 GDP without India's participation.

Ryan Hass, a senior fellow in foreign policy at the Brookings Institution, said in 2021 that much of the narrative of China "inexorably rising and on the verge of overtaking a faltering United States" was promoted by China's state-affiliated media outlets, adding, "Authoritarian systems excel at showcasing their strengths and concealing their weaknesses." Political scientist Matthew Kroenig said in 2020, "the plans often cited as evidence of China's farsighted vision, the Belt and Road Initiative and Made in China 2025, were announced by Xi only in 2013 and 2015, respectively. Both are way too recent to be celebrated as brilliant examples of successful, long-term strategic planning."

Depending on different assumptions of scenarios, it has been estimated that China would either overtake the U.S. to become the world's biggest economy in the 2030s or never be able to do so.

=== International relations ===
In 2011, Michael Beckley, then a research fellow at the Harvard Kennedy School, released his journal China's Century? Why America's Edge Will Endure which rejects that the U.S. is in decline relative to China or that the hegemonic burdens the U.S. bears to sustain a globalized system contributes to its decline. Beckley argues the U.S. power is durable, and "unipolarity" and globalization are the main reasons. He says, "The United States derives competitive advantages from its preponderant position, and globalization allows it to exploit these advantages, attracting economic activity and manipulating the international system to its benefit."

Beckley believes that if the United States was in terminal decline, it would adopt neomercantilist economic policies and disengage from military commitments in Asia. "If however, the United States is not in decline, and if globalization and hegemony are the main reasons why, then the United States should do the opposite: it should contain China’s growth by maintaining a liberal international economic policy, and it should subdue China’s ambitions by sustaining a robust political and military presence in Asia." Beckley believes that the United States benefits from being an extant hegemon—the U.S. did not overturn the international order to its benefit in 1990, but rather, the existing order collapsed around it.

Scholars that are skeptical of the U.S.'s ability to maintain a leading position include Robert Pape, who has calculated that "one of the largest relative declines in modern history" stems from "the spread of technology to the rest of the world". Similarly, Fareed Zakaria writes, "The unipolar order of the last two decades is waning not because of Iraq but because of the broader diffusion of power across the world." Paul Kipchumba in Africa in China's 21st Century: In Search of a Strategy predicts a deadly cold war between the U.S. and China in the 21st century, and, if that cold war does not occur, he predicts China will supplant the U.S. in all aspects of global hegemony.

Academic Rosemary Foot writes that the rise of China has led to some renegotiations of the U.S. hegemony in the Asia-Pacific region, but inconsistency between China's stated ambitions and policy actions has prompted various forms of resistance which leaves U.S. hegemony only partially challenged. Meanwhile, C. Raja Mohan observes that "many of China’s neighbors are steadily drifting toward either neutrality between Beijing and Washington or simply acceptance of being dominated by their giant neighbor." However, he also notes that Australia, India, and Japan have readily challenged Beijing. Richard Heyderian proposes that "America’s edge over China is its broad and surprisingly durable network of regional alliances, particularly with middle powers Japan, Australia and, increasingly, India, which share common, though not identical, concerns over China’s rising assertiveness."

In the midst of global concerns that China's economic influence included political leverage, Chinese leader Xi Jinping stated "No matter how far China develops, it will never seek hegemony". At several international summits, one being the World Economic Forum in January 2021, Chinese leader Xi Jinping stated a preference for multilateralism and international cooperation. However, political scientist Stephen Walt contrasts the public message with China's intimidation of neighboring countries. Stephen Walt suggests that the U.S. "should take Xi up on his stated preference for multilateral engagement and use America’s vastly larger array of allies and partners to pursue favorable outcomes within various multilateral forums." Though encouraging the possibility of mutually beneficial cooperation, he argues that "competition between the two largest powers is to a considerable extent hardwired into the emerging structure of the international system." According to former Singaporean Prime Minister Lee Kuan Yew, China will "[initially] want to share this century as co-equals with the U.S.", but have "the intention to be the greatest power in the world" eventually.

Writing in the Asia Europe Journal, Lei Yu and Sophia Sui suggest that the China-Russia strategic partnership "shows China’s strategic intention of enhancing its 'hard' power in order to elevate its status at the systemic (global) level."

In 2018, Xiangming Chen wrote that China was potentially creating a New Great Game, shifted to geoeconomic competition compared with the original Great Game. Chen stated that China would play the role of the British Empire (and Russia the role of the 19th century Russian Empire) in the analogy as the "dominant power players vs. the weaker independent Central Asian states". Additionally, he suggested that ultimately the Belt and Road Initiative could turn the "China-Central Asia nexus into a vassal relationship characterized by cross-border investment by China for border security and political stability."

=== Science and technology ===
According to the World Intellectual Property Indicators, China received more applications than the U.S. did in 2018 and 2019 and ranked first globally in patents, utility models, trademarks, industrial designs, and creative goods exports in 2021. In 2022, China overtook the US in the Nature Index, which measures the share of published articles in leading scientific journals. In recent years, China made rapid advances in key technological areas, becoming a world leader in tech such as electric vehicles, lithium batteries and solar panels. Desipte being a middle-income country in the 2020s, China became a high-tech manufacturing superpower through decades long investments, industrial policies, and powerful government institutions.

=== Energy security ===
Since 2013, China has been the world's largest importer of crude oil, and in 2022 it became the world's largest refiner, turning imported crude into gasoline, diesel, and jet fuel for domestic use and export to other Asian countries. As China imported large amounts of energy resources (crude oil, natural gas, coal, etc.) from other countries, including Gulf states, Russia, Iran and the United States, this dependency on foreign energy sources was seen as a major vulnerability and weakness of the Chinese economy and national power. These exporting petrostates could significantly influence the price on global markets or by withholding supplies. To gain energy security and energy independence, China invested heavily in renewable energy and became one of the leading countries of energy transition and the development of renewable energy technologies (solar panels, wind turbines, and lithium-ion batteries), supply chains, manufacturing capability, and rare earth supplies. Countries with abundant renewable resources and the minerals required for renewable technology were expected to gain geopolitical influence.

China is called a 'clean energy superpower' due to the country's long-term strategy and investment in renewable energy. China curbs its reliance on foreign energy by expanding domestic solar, wind, and nuclear energy supply, making the country's economy more resilient against oil supply outages and price hikes. In 2025, the country accounts for 80% of solar panel manufacturing capacity and 60% of wind turbine production in the world, and dominated relevant industries such as the new energy automobiles. The decades-long investment also ensured China's leadership position in climate politics, especially after the United States forfeited its climate leadership position after the country left the Paris agreement.

To mitigate economic shocks related to petroleum, China invested heavily in domestic oil production, becoming one of the top oil producers in the 2020s. The country also built the world's largest strategic petroleum reserve by the 2020s, with a two-part system consisting of a government-controlled strategic reserve complemented by mandated commercial reserves. China's ability to weather global oil shock was first displayed when the country insulated itself significantly from the 2026 Iran war and ensuing fuel crisis. The robust reserve ensured domestic supplies, with the growing renewable energy sector and electric vehicle industry reducing the demand for petroleum products, and China's control of refinery capability meant it can control the petroleum products flow in Asia, which China used to improve friendly relations or to secure diplomatic leverage. The conflict has also provided China with an opportunity to expand its renewable energy technologies globally.

Analysts noted that China's ability to pause demand at will and balance the market with the stockpile during the 2026 Iran War meant the country can control the global oil price, which weakened the leverage held by traditional oil producers, with some commentators claiming that China has fully become an energy superpower.

=== Military strength ===
Top five countries by military expenditure in 2023

The United States' view of Chinese military power relative to itself shifted rapidly in the 21st century. The 2014 Quadrennial Defense Review described China as having a "growing presence and influence," while still treating it as both a potential security partner. After 2014, the Obama administration designated the Chinese military as a component of the renewed great-power competition. Under the first Trump administration, the 2018 National Defense Strategy named China a "revisionist power" and "strategic competitor," placing it alongside Russia as a principal U.S. defense priority. The Biden administration's 2022 strategy further elevated China as the "most consequential strategic competitor" and the Pentagon's "pacing threat," more structurally important than Russia despite Russia's active invasion of Ukraine. In 2026, the Pentagon framed China as the world's "second most powerful country" and deemed it to pose a greater security challenge than Nazi Germany, Imperial Japan, and the Soviet Union at their peaks. The 2026 report emphasized maintaining a favorable military balance in the Indo-Pacific.

=== Demography ===
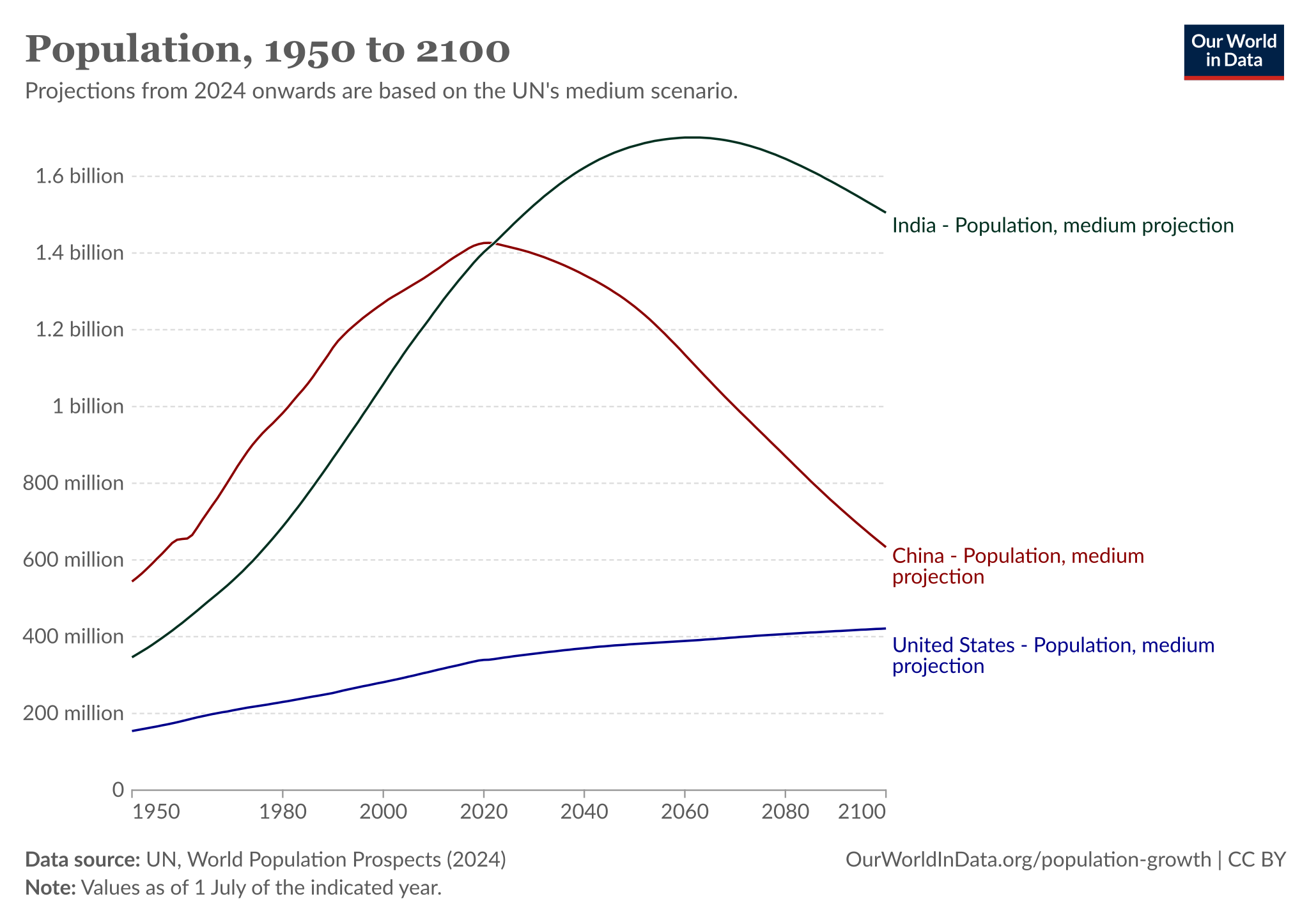
Historical estimates of population, combined with the projected population to 2100 based on the UN's medium variant scenario for the top 3 countries with the largest current population: India, China, and the U.S.

World Bank projections of China's working-age population through 2050

China's emergence as a global economic power is tied to its large, working population. However, the population in China is aging faster than almost any other country in history. In 2050, the proportion of Chinese over retirement age will become 39 percent of the total population according to projections. China is rapidly aging at an earlier stage of its development than other countries. Current demographic trends could hinder economic growth, create challenging social problems, and limit China's capabilities to act as a new global hegemony.

Brendan O'Reilly, a guest expert at Geopolitical Intelligence Services, wrote in 2016, "A dark scenario of demographic decline sparking a negative feedback loop of economic crisis, political instability, emigration and further decreased fertility is very real for China". Nicholas Eberstadt, an economist and demographic expert at the American Enterprise Institute, said in 2019 that current demographic trends will overwhelm China's economy and geopolitics, making its rise much more uncertain. He said, "The age of heroic economic growth is over."

Ryan Hass at the Brookings said in 2021 that China's "working-age population is already shrinking; by 2050, China will go from having eight workers per retiree now to two workers per retiree. Moreover, it has already squeezed out most of the large productivity gains that come with a population becoming more educated and urban and adopting technologies to make manufacturing more efficient."

According to American economist Scott Rozelle and researcher Natalie Hell in 2020, "China looks a lot more like 1980s Mexico or Turkey than 1980s Taiwan or South Korea. No country has ever made it to high-income status with high school attainment rates below 50 percent. With China's high school attainment rate of 30 percent, the country could be in grave trouble." They warn that China risks falling into the middle income trap due to the rural urban divide in education and structural unemployment. Economists Martin Chorzempa and Tianlei Huang of the Peterson Institute agreed with this assessment in 2021, adding that "China has overlooked rural development much too long", and must invest in the educational and health resources of its rural communities to solve an ongoing human capital crisis.

=== Economic growth and debt ===
China's share of global export (1990–2019)

The People's Republic of China was the only major economy that reported growth in 2020, during the COVID-19 pandemic. The economy of China expanded by 2.3% while the U.S. economy and the eurozone are expected to have shrunk by 3.6% and 7.4% respectively. China's share of the global GDP rose to 16.8%, while the U.S. economy accounted for 22.2% of global GDP in 2020. By the end of 2024, however, the Chinese economy is expected to be smaller than what was previously projected, while the U.S. economy is expected to be larger, according to the International Monetary Fund's 2021 report on the global economic outlook.

China's increased lending has been primarily driven by its desire to increase economic growth as fast as possible. The performance of local government officials has for decades been evaluated almost entirely on their ability to produce economic growth. Amanda Lee reports in the South China Morning Post that "as China’s growth has slowed, there are growing concerns that many of these debts are at risk of default, which could trigger a systemic crisis in China’s state-dominated financial system".

Diana Choyleva of Enodo Economics predicted in 2021 that China's debt ratio will soon surpass that of Japan at the peak of its crisis. Choyleva argues "For evidence that Beijing realizes it is drowning in debt and needs a lifebuoy, look no further than the government's own actions. It is finally injecting a degree of pricing discipline into the corporate bond market and it is actively encouraging foreign investors to help finance the reduction of a huge pile of bad debt."

China's debt-to-GDP ratio increased from 178% in the first quarter of 2010 to 275% in the first quarter of 2020. China's debt-to-GDP ratio approached 335% in the second and third quarters of 2020. Ryan Hass at the Brookings said in 2021, "China is running out of productive places to invest in infrastructure, and rising debt levels will further complicate its growth path."

The PRC government regularly revises its GDP figures, often toward the end of the year. As local governments face political pressure to meet pre-set growth targets, there is some contention on the accuracy of their statistical data. However, the Peterson Institute for International Economics notes that China's National Bureau of Statistics is increasing its adoption of international standards on macroeconomic data.

According to American strategist and historian Edward Luttwak in 2020, China will not be burdened by huge economic or population problems, but will fail strategically because "the emperor makes all the decisions and he doesn't have anybody to correct him." He said that geopolitically, China "gained one year in the race" in 2020 by using the measures of a totalitarian government, but this has brought the "China threat" to the fore, pushing other governments to respond.

Sociologist Ho-Fung Hung stated in 2022 that, although China's extensive lending during the COVID-19 pandemic allowed a quick rebound after the initial lockdown, it contributed to the already deep indebtedness of many of China's corporations, slowing the economy by 2021 and depressing long-term performance. Hung also pointed out that in 2008, although it was claimed mainly in propaganda that the Chinese yuan could overtake the US dollar as a reserve currency, after a decade the yuan has since stalled and decreased in international usage, ranking below the British pound sterling, let alone the dollar.

=== Chinese decline ===
Some scholars argue that China's rise will be over by the 2020s. According to foreign policy experts Michael Beckley and Hal Brands in 2021, China, as a revisionist power, has little time to change the status quo of the world in its favor due to "severe resource scarcity", "demographic collapse", and "losing access to the welcoming world that enabled its advance", adding that "peak China" has already come.

According to Andrew Erickson of the U.S. Naval War College and Gabriel Collins of the Baker Institute in 2022, China's power is peaking, creating "a decade of danger from a system that increasingly realizes it only has a short time to fulfill some of its most critical, long-held goals". David Von Drehle, a columnist for The Washington Post, wrote in 2021 that it would be more difficult for the West to manage China's decline than its rise.

According to John Mueller at the Cato Institute in 2021, a "descent or at least prolonged stagnation might come about, rather than a continued rise" for China. He listed the environment, corruption, ethnic and religious tensions, Chinese hostility toward foreign businesses, among others, as contributing factors to China's impending decline.

According to Yi Fuxian, a Chinese demographer and reproductive health researcher at the University of Wisconsin-Madison, in 2023, the Chinese Century is "already over". In contrast, Thomas L. Friedman, an American columnist for The New York Times wrote in 2025: "There was a time when people came to America to see the future ... Now they come here [to China]."

== Public opinion ==
According to a March 2026 Pew Research Center poll, 62% of Americans think China is getting stronger, 9% believe it is getting weaker, while 25% think its power is staying the same; China was the only country which a majority of Americans see as getting stronger. At the same poll, 57% of Americans consider the US to be a superpower, while 44% consider China to be a superpower.

== See also ==
China specific

- Adoption of Chinese literary culture
- Century of humiliation
- China lobby
- China's peaceful rise
- Chinese Dream
- Reform and opening up
- Pax Sinica
- String of Pearls (Indian Ocean)
- Great changes unseen in a century

Counter China

- Blue Team (U.S. politics)
- China containment policy
- Quadrilateral Security Dialogue
- Geostrategy in Central Asia
- Malabar (naval exercise)
- China–United States relations
- India–United States relations
- Japan–United States relations

General

- Asian Century
- Indian Century
- Post–Cold War era
- Great Divergence
- Great power
- New world order
- Potential superpower
- Group of Two
- The Rise and Fall of the Great Powers
