= Indian Century =

Idea of Indian prominence in the 21st century

Flag of the Republic of India

The Indian Century is a neologism suggesting that the 21st century may be dominated by India, as the 20th century is often called the American Century, and the 19th century British Century. The phrase is particularly used in the assertion that India's economy could overtake the economies of the United States and the economy of China as the largest national economy in the world, echoing its 23% share of the world economy in the mid-18th century, and up from a 3% share at the end of British rule.

== Debates and factors ==
According to the report named "Indian Century: Defining India's Place in a Rapidly Changing Global Economy" by IBM Institute for Business Value, India is predicted to be among the world's highest-growth nations over the coming years.

As per a report released by Federation of Indian Chambers of Commerce & Industry (FICCI) and McKinsey & Company titled "India’s Century – Achieving sustainable, inclusive growth", India has the potential to become an "economic superpower" before its 100th year of Independence (2047).

India is a member of Build Back Better World and has also created North–South Transport Corridor as an alternative to the Belt and Road Initiative policy initiative of China (PRC), to link in with Iran, Russia, the Caucasus, and Central Asia. In 2017, India and Japan joined together to form the Asia-Africa Growth Corridor in order to better integrate the economies of South, Southeast, and East Asia with Oceania and Africa. India also engages in the Quadrilateral Security Dialogue and in Malabar (naval exercise) as part of a China containment policy.

Top five countries by military expenditure in 2023

One of the key factors includes its populous democracy. According to a United Nations report, India overtook China to become the world's most populous nation in 2023. Its size and location in Asia and the Indian Ocean poises it to play a significant role in matters around the world, as demonstrated during its time in the British Empire, though this history is also a factor in China's opposition to India's rise.

Economists and researchers at Harvard University have projected India's 7% projected annual growth rate through 2024 will continue to put it ahead of China, making India the fastest growing major economy in the world. In 2017, the Center for International Development at Harvard University published a research study projecting that India has emerged as the economic pole of global growth by surpassing China and is expected to maintain its lead over the coming decade.

India has very recently been considered either a major great power or to be emerging as such (well beyond middle powers) and is generally considered an emerging superpower due to its large and stable population and its rapidly growing economic and military sectors.

== Data ==
=== GDP (nominal) past and forecasts ===
The top 15 largest economies in the world (GDP nominal from 1990-2030 in billions USD)
Country	1990	Country	2000	Country	2010	Country	2020	Country	2030
United States	5,963	United States	10,250	United States	15,048	United States	21,354	United States	37,153
Japan	3,185	Japan	4,968	China	6,138	China	15,103	China	25,827
Germany	1,604	Germany	1,967	Japan	5,759	Japan	5,054	India	6,769
France	1,260	United Kingdom	1,668	Germany	3,470	Germany	3,936	Germany	5,575
United Kingdom	1,197	France	1,361	France	2,648	United Kingdom	2,698	Japan	4,994
Italy	1,164	China	1,220	United Kingdom	2,487	India	2,674	United Kingdom	4,955
Canada	596	Italy	1,150	Brazil	2,208	France	2,645	France	3,754
Iran	581	Canada	744	Italy	2,146	Italy	1,905	Canada	2,792
Spain	536	Mexico	742	India	1,675	South Korea	1,744	Italy	2,779
Brazil	455	Brazil	655	South Africa	1,633	Canada	1,655	Brazil	2,679
China	397	Spain	598	Canada	1,617	South Africa	1,488	South Africa	2,384
Australia	324	South Korea	597	Spain	1,429	Brazil	1,476	Spain	2,201
Netherlands	321	India	468	Australia	1,254	Australia	1,362	Australia	2,181
India	320	Netherlands	417	South Korea	1,192	Spain	1,288	Mexico	2,151
Mexico	307	Australia	400	Mexico	1,105	Mexico	1,121	South Korea	2,149

== See also ==
- Angus Maddison statistics of the ten largest economies by GDP (PPP)
- Asian Century – Projected dominance of Asian politics and culture during the 21st century
- Chinese Century – Idea that China may dominate the 21st century
- Pax Britannica – Period of relative world peace under British hegemony
- American Century – Term for American geopolitical dominance
- Greater India – Cultural sphere of India beyond the Indian subcontinent
- History of Indian influence on Southeast Asia
- Indianisation – Spread of Indian religions, culture, diaspora, soft power, economic reach and impact
- Indianization of Southeast Asia – Cultural sphere of India beyond the Indian subcontinent
- New world order – Period of history with a dramatic change in world political thought
- Potential superpowers – State with extensive power or influence over much of the world
- The Next 100 Years: A Forecast for the 21st Century – 2009 nonfiction book by George Friedman
