= Rosemary Foot (academic) =

Rosemary June Foot, FBA (born 4 June 1948) is a British international relations scholar and political scientist. She is a Professor of International Relations and the John Swire Senior research Fellow in International Relations, St. Antony's College, Oxford. Her research interests are in the fields of security studies and human rights, with special reference to the Asia-Pacific. She has been a Fellow of the British Academy since 1996.

Her works include the books Order and Justice in International Relations (co-edited), and Rights Beyond Borders: The Global Community and the Struggle over Human Rights in China.
