= List of countries by largest historical GDP =

This list of countries by largest historical GDP shows how the membership and rankings of the world's ten largest economies as measured by their gross domestic product has changed. While the United States has consistently had the world's largest economy for some time, in the last fifty years the world has seen both rises and falls in relative terms of the economies of other countries.

== By average values of GDP ==
=== Nominal ===
The ten largest economies by average values of GDP (nominal) (Note: This is, the absolute gross domestic product or total productive output of a country, not always reflective of the cost of life inside a nation independent of the global economy.) by every half decade from the available data in IMF, World Bank, and United Nations lists (in USD billions)
Year	1st	2nd	3rd	4th	5th	6th	7th	8th	9th	10th
2025	U.S. 30,767	China; 19,626	Germany; 5,048	Japan; 4,435	UK; 4,003	India; 3,916	France; 3,368	Russia; 2,568	Italy; 2,550	Brazil; 2,319
2020	U.S. 21,354	China; 15,103	Japan; 5,054	Germany; 3,937	UK; 2,699	India; 2,675	France; 2,646	Italy; 1,906	Brazil; 1,744	Russia; 1,656
2015	U.S. 18,295	China; 11,307	Japan; 4,445	Germany; 3,425	UK; 2,929	France; 2,443	India; 2,104	Italy; 1,846	Brazil; 1,800	Russia; 1,557
2010	U.S. 15,049	China; 6,139	Japan; 5,759	Germany; 3,471	France; 2,648	UK; 2,488	Brazil; 2,209	Italy; 2,147	India; 1,676	Russia; 1,633
2005	U.S. 13,039	China; 4,831	Germany; 2,895	UK; 2,546	Japan; 2,326	France; 2,193	Italy; 1,866	Canada; 1,174	Spain; 1,155	Brazil; 972
2000	U.S. 10,251	Japan; 4,968	Germany; 1,968	UK; 1,669	France; 1,362	China; 1,220	Italy; 1,150	Canada; 745	Mexico; 742	Brazil; 655
1995	U.S. 7,640	Japan; 5,546	Germany; 2,595	France; 1,596	UK; 1,345	Italy; 1,178	Brazil; 771	China; 738	Spain; 615	Canada; 606
1990	U.S. 5,963	Soviet Union; 3,186	Japan; 2‚667	West Germany; 1,604	France; 1,261	UK; 1,197	Italy; 1,164	Canada; 596	Brazil; 581	Spain; 536
1985	U.S. 4,339	Soviet Union; 2‚200	Japan; 1,427	West Germany; 663	France; 552	UK; 537	Italy; 455	Canada; 366	China; 311	India; 234
1980	U.S. 2,857	Soviet Union; 1,212	Japan; 1,129	West Germany; 857	France; 695	UK; 605	Italy; 480	China; 304	Canada; 276	Mexico; 242
1975	U.S. 1,689	Soviet Union; 689	Japan; 513	West Germany; 475	France; 356	UK; 236	Italy; 219	Canada; 173	China; 161	Brazil; 116
1970	U.S. 1,076	Soviet Union; 433	Japan; 209	West Germany; 209	France; 146	UK; 125	Italy; 109	China; 91	Canada; 88	India; 62
1965	U.S. 712	Soviet Union; 367	West Germany; 125	France; 102	UK; 101	Japan; 91	China; 70	Italy; 68	India; 61	Canada; 54
1960	U.S. 521	Soviet Union; 142	West Germany; 92	UK; 72	France; 62	China; 61	Japan; 44	Canada; 41	Italy; 40	India; 37

=== PPP ===
The ten largest economies by average values of GDP (PPP) (Note: Purchasing power parity (PPP) is the exchange-rate-adjusted GDP, accounting for the value of money in different countries.) by every half decade from the available data in IMF and World Bank lists (in USD billions)
Year	1st	2nd	3rd	4th	5th	6th	7th	8th	9th	10th
2025	China; 41,241	U.S. 30,767	India; 17,257	Russia; 7,236	Japan; 7,009	Germany; 6,181	Indonesia; 5,047	Brazil; 4,988	France; 4,563	UK; 4,553
2020	China; 22,961	U.S. 21,354	India; 9,771	Japan; 5,357	Germany; 4,880	Russia; 4,651	Brazil; 3,360	France; 3,345	Indonesia; 3,223	UK; 3,219
2015	U.S. 18,295	China; 14,835	India; 7,032	Japan; 4,999	Germany; 4,143	Russia; 3,631	Brazil; 2,959	UK; 2,829	France; 2,811	Indonesia; 2,520
2010	U.S. 15,049	China; 11,225	India; 4,730	Japan; 4,370	Germany; 3,510	Russia; 3,077	Brazil; 2,576	France; 2,448	UK; 2,364	Italy; 2,280
2005	U.S. 13,039	China; 5,985	Japan; 3,986	India; 3,066	Germany; 3,011	Russia; 2,352	France; 2,126	Italy; 2,111	UK; 2,104	Brazil; 1,883
2000	U.S. 10,251	Japan; 3,351	China; 3,338	Germany; 2,608	India; 2,000	Italy; 1,799	France; 1,743	UK; 1,655	Russia; 1,557	Brazil; 1,456
1995	U.S. 7,640	Japan; 2,929	Germany; 2,175	China; 2,024	Italy; 1,488	France; 1,385	India; 1,371	Russia; 1,323	UK; 1,273	Brazil; 1,205
1990	U.S. 5,963	Soviet Union; 2,500	Japan; 2,405	West Germany; 1,744	Italy; 1,237	France; 1,144	UK; 1,054	China; 995	India; 948	Brazil; 922
1985	U.S. 4,339	Soviet Union; 2,500	Japan; 1,625	West Germany; 1,262	Italy; 908	France; 830	UK; 766	Brazil; 715	Mexico; 628	India; 608
1980	U.S. 2,857	Soviet Union; 2,000	Japan; 1,028	West Germany; 922	Italy; 623	France; 593	UK; 529	Brazil; 525	Mexico; 442	India; 366

== World Bank statistics ==
This historical list of the ten largest countries by GDP according to the World Bank shows how the membership and rankings of the world's ten largest economies has changed. Historically, the United States was consistently year after year the world's largest economy since the early twentieth century. However, the report from 2014 showed that for the very first time China overtook the United States as the largest economy in the world taking into account purchasing power parity (PPP). Indeed, the margin of power between nations had generally widened and then lessened over time, and over the last fifty years the world has seen the rapid rise and fall in relative terms of the economies of other countries.

Historical list of the world's ten largest economies by GDP (PPP) (billions USD) (World Bank)
Year	2015	2010	2005	2000	1995	1990
World	113,612.52	87,771.66	64,415.31	47,453.19	36,104.40	28,249.60
Top 10	68,997.53	52,354.88	38,551.92	28,608.96	21,680.22	17,073.82
1st	China; 19,524.35	U.S. 14,964.40	U.S. 13,095.40	U.S. 10,289.70	U.S. 7,664.00	U.S. 5,979.60
2nd	U.S. 17,947.00	China; 12,097.93	China; 6,470.18	China; 3,616.33	Japan; 2,878.16	Japan; 2,377.97
3rd	India; 8,003.40	India; 5,478.71	Japan; 3,889.58	Japan; 3,289.80	China; 2,151.44	USSR; 1,885.97
4th	Japan; 5,546.56	Japan; 4,322.67	India; 3,343.43	India; 2,150.17	Germany; 1,834.80	Germany; 1,472.12
5th	Germany; 3,848.27	Germany; 3,234.90	Germany; 2,566.00	Germany; 2,119.99	India; 1,474.18	China; 1,142.67
6th	Russia; 3,579.83	Russia; 2,924.79	UK; 2,006.91	UK; 1,553.96	Brazil; 1,271.43	India; 1,020.02
7th	Brazil; 3,192.40	Brazil; 2,685.98	Brazil; 1,965.60	France; 1,534.81	Italy; 1,204.87	France; 1,002.53
8th	Indonesia; 2,842.24	France; 2,332.57	France; 1,860.70	Brazil; 1,525.28	France; 1,201.81	Italy; 1,001.12
9th	UK; 2,691.81	UK; 2,254.82	Russia; 1,696.73	Italy; 1,468.18	UK; 1,166.04	Brazil; 969.02
10th	France; 2,650.82	Italy; 2,058.11	Italy; 1,657.40	Mexico; 1,060.75	Russia; 833.47	UK; 919.32

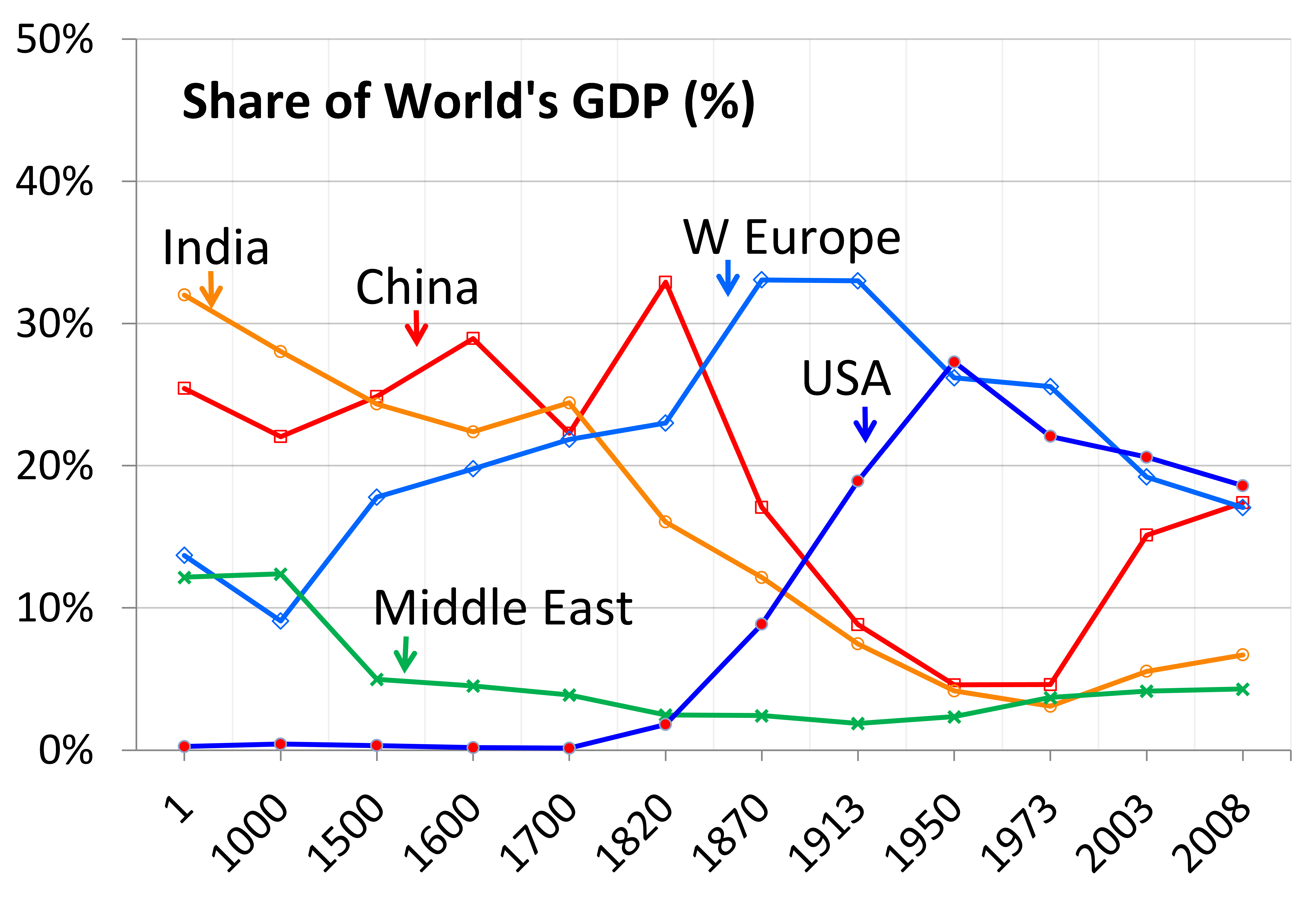
The global contribution to world's GDP by major economies from 1 AD to 2008 AD according to Angus Maddison's estimates

== Angus Maddison statistics ==
This historical list of the ten largest countries by GDP compiled by British economist Angus Maddison shows how much the membership and rankings of the world's ten largest economies has changed. The following estimates are taken mainly from the 2007 monograph Contours of the World Economy, 1–2030 AD by Angus Maddison.

(GDP (PPP) in millions of 1990 International Dollars) (Note: These GDP (PPP) estimates are mostly based on the present territorial boundaries, with the exception of France, Germany, India, Russia/Soviet Union, and the United Kingdom at specified periods. Although the Russian Empire and Soviet Union are included, the Austrian and Austro-Hungarian Empires are excluded from general reference tables, except when modern Austria is compared with Cisleithania in one reference table.)
Year	1st	2nd	3rd	4th	5th	6th	7th	8th	9th	10th
2003	U.S. 8,430,762	China; 6,187,984	Japan; 2,699,261	India; 2,267,136	Germany; 1,577,423	France; 1,315,601	UK; 1,280,625	Italy; 1,110,691	Brazil; 1,013,000	Russia; 914,000
1990	U.S. 5,803,200	Japan; 2,321,153	China; 2,109,400	Soviet Union; 1,987,955 (Note: The Russian Soviet Socialist Republic represented 1,151,040 million in GDP (PPP) of the total figure of the Soviet Union.)	West Germany; 1,182,261 (Note: West Germany (1990 frontiers))	India; 1,098,100	France; 1,026,491	UK; 944,610	Italy; 925,654	Brazil; 743,765
1973	U.S. 3,536,622	Soviet Union; 1,513,070 (Note: The Russian Soviet Socialist Republic represented 872,466 million in GDP (PPP) of the total figure of the Soviet Union.)	Japan; 1,242,932	West Germany; 814,796 (Note: West Germany (1990 frontiers))	China; 739,414	France; 683,965	UK; 675,941	Italy; 582,713	India; 494,832	Brazil; 401,643
1950	U.S. 1,455,916	Soviet Union; 510,243	UK; 347,850	China; 244,985	India; 222,222 (Note: GDP (PPP) figures for India after Partition, which decreased GDP from 258,164 million at the end of 1946 to 213,680 million at the end of 1947.)	France; 220,492	West Germany; 213,942 (Note: West Germany (1990 frontiers))	Italy; 164,957	Japan; 160,966	Canada; 102,164
1913	U.S. 517,383	China; 241,341	Germany; 237,332 (Note: Based on 1913 frontiers but excluding Reichsland Alsace-Lorraine.)	Russia; 232,351 (Note: Anachronistic figures based on the 1989 frontiers of the Soviet Union.)	UK; 224,618 (Note: Includes 11,891 million in GDP (PPP) of the Kingdom of Ireland. England, Wales, and Scotland GDP (PPP) was 212,727 million.)	India; 204,242 (Note: GDP (PPP) figures for Undivided India.)	France; 144,489 (Note: This figure excludes the impact of the loss of Alsace-Lorraine between 1871-1918.)	Italy; 95,487 (Note: Austria-Hungary had a larger GDP (PPP) of 100,515, see note on Spain in 1913.)	Japan; 71,653 (Note: Austria-Hungary had a larger GDP (PPP) of 100,515, see note on Spain in 1913.)	Spain; 41,653 (Note: Spain is included based on the overall tables in Angus Maddison, which does not refer to Austria-Hungary. In 1913, however, the Cisleithania portion of Austria-Hungary alone had a GDP (PPP) of 62,638 million. According to Max Stephan Schulze, Austria-Hungary had a GDP (PPP) of 100,515 million in 1913 when compared to Russia (254,448 million), Germany (237,332 million), United Kingdom (224,618 million), France (144,489 million) and Italy (95,487 million). Schulze's figures correspond to Angus Maddison, with the notable exception of the Russian Empire, whose GDP (PPP) is estimated to be approximately 9 per cent larger.)
1870	China; 189,470	India; 134,882 (Note: GDP (PPP) figures for Undivided India.)	UK; 100,180 (Note: Includes 9,619 million in GDP (PPP) of the Kingdom of Ireland. England, Wales, and Scotland GDP (PPP) was 90,560 million.)	U.S. 98,374	Russia; 83,646 (Note: Anachronistic figures based on the 1989 frontiers of the Soviet Union.)	Germany; 72,149 (Note: Based on 1913 frontiers but excluding Reichsland Alsace-Lorraine. During the Franco-Prussian War of 1870-71, Germany had taken Alsace-Lorraine from France. At the time, this annexation had increased both its population and GDP by four per cent.)	France; 72,100 (Note: This figure excludes the impact of the loss of Alsace-Lorraine between 1871-1918 and the impact of the acquisition of territory in 1861 from Italy in the Savoie and Nice.)	Italy; 41,814	Japan; 25,393 (Note: Austria-Hungary had a larger GDP (PPP) in 1870, based on Cisleithania's estimated GDP (PPP) of 25,003 million and also the estimated GDP (PPP) of just the territory of modern Hungary in 1870 at 6,459 million.)	Spain; 19,556 (Note: Spain is included based on the overall tables in Angus Maddison, which does not refer to Austria-Hungary. In 1870, the Cisleithania portion of Austria-Hungary alone had a GDP (PPP) of 25,003 million.)
1820	China; 228,600	India; 111,417 (Note: GDP (PPP) figures for Undivided India.)	Russia; 37,678 (Note: Anachronistic figures based on the 1989 frontiers of the Soviet Union.)	UK; 36,232 (Note: Includes 6,231 million in GDP (PPP) of the Kingdom of Ireland. England, Wales, and Scotland GDP (PPP) was 30,001 million.)	France; 35,468	Germany; 26,819 (Note: Anachronistic figures based on the 1913 frontiers of the German Empire but excluding Reichsland Alsace-Lorraine. This figure includes contributions made by parts of the Kingdom of Prussia and the Prussian-led German Empire that were never included in the German Confederation between 1815 and 1866, while excluding contributions that would have been made by parts of the Austrian Empire included within the German Confederation between 1815 and 1866, namely, modern Austria and the Lands of the Bohemian Crown. In 1820, the territory of modern Austria constituted 4,104 million in GDP (PPP), while Czechoslovakia constituted 6,501 million in GDP (PPP). However, this retrospective figure for Czechoslovakia includes contributions by territories of modern Slovakia, much of which was then a constituent part of the Kingdom of Hungary within the Austrian Empire and excluded from the German Confederation)	Italy; 22,535 (Note: Italy was not unified as a country until 1861, this GDP (PPP) figure and following figures for Italy represents the combined output of the regions comprising the modern country of Italy since 1946, which in 1820 were ruled by various Italian and non-Italian polities.)	Japan; 20,739 (Note: This GDP (PPP) figure and further figures for Japan is based on territories comprising the modern country of Japan since 1947.)	U.S. 12,548 (Note: Spain and USA are included based on the overall tables in Angus Maddison, which does not refer to the Austrian Empire that potentially could have had a larger GDP (PPP) in 1820. The territories of modern Austria and Czechoslovakia constituted 4,104 million and 6,501 million GDP (PPP) within the Austrian Empire, and these two figures do not take into account the rest of the Kingdom of Hungary and other constituents of the Austrian Empire.)	Spain; 12,299 (Note: See note on USA in 1820.)

== By country ==
The United States represented 28.69% of the world's economy in 1960 (highest point). It accounted for 1.8% of the world's economy in 1820, 8.9% in 1870, and 18.9% in 1913. As of 2025, the United States accounts for approximately 26.8% of global GDP (nominal) and 14.7% of global GDP (PPP), as per IMF estimates. The US surpassed China to become the world's largest economy around 1890, and has held the position ever since.

China represented 1.61% of the world's economy in 1987 (lowest point), rising to 18% (nominal) and 19% (PPP) in 2022. It accounted for 25.4% of global GDP in 1 CE, 29% of world global output in 1600 CE, 17.3% of the world's economy in 1870, and 33% in 1820 (its highest point). China's share of global GDP varied from a quarter to a third of global output until the late 19th century. As of 2025, China accounts for approximately 17% of global GDP (nominal) and 19.7% of global GDP (PPP), as per IMF estimates.

As of 2025, the EU accounts for approximately 17.6% of global GDP (nominal) and 14% of global GDP (PPP), as per IMF estimates. With highest being in 2001 when the EU block reached an peak of contribution in Global GDP of around 26% share in Global GDP.

The gross domestic product of India in 1500 was estimated at 24.4% of the world's economy in 1500, 22.4% in 1600, 16% in 1820, and 12.1% in 1870. India's share of global GDP declined to less than 2% of global GDP by the time of its independence in 1947, and only rose gradually after the liberalization of its economy beginning in the 1990s. As of 2025, India accounts for approximately 3.7% of global GDP (nominal) and 8.5% of global GDP (PPP), as per IMF estimates.
