= Pacific Century =

Projected 21st-century Pacific Rim dominance

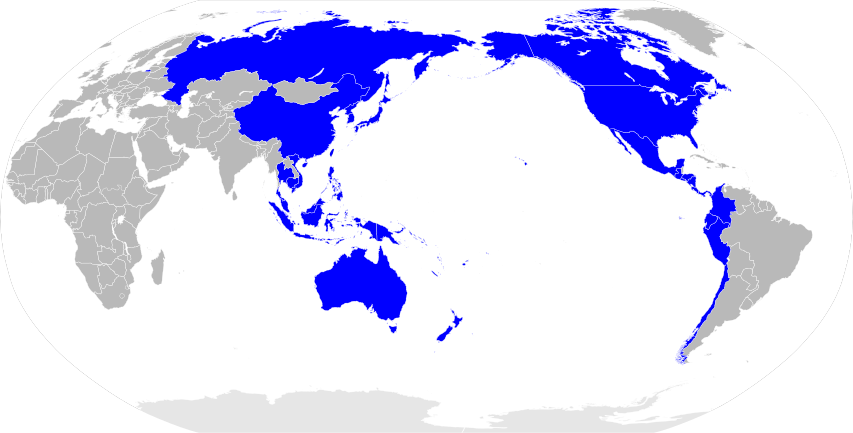
The Pacific Rim countries.

The Pacific Century is a rhetorical term describing a potential 21st-century dominance of Pacific Rim countries.

== History ==
=== Precursors ===
The prediction that the Pacific would transcend the Atlantic as a "center of gravity of world commerce" has been credited to Marx and Engels.

Though the concept of an American Pacific Century came to be discussed more towards the 21st century, Christopher Capozzola has argued that an American Pacific Century already happened in the 20th century, with the 1898 American annexation of the Philippines having led into heavy American involvement in the Pacific region. Mark Borthwick has also argued that the parts of the 19th and 20th centuries were Pacific Centuries of sorts, since the westernization that took place in Pacific Asia at the time paved the way for the region's rise.

=== Modern history ===
The concept of a Pacific Century began to receive greater support in the late 20th century as Pacific Asian economies grew rapidly. By the late 1970s, the concept of a Pacific Century was used in America to describe a potential economic integration of America's West Coast with Japan. The 1989 formation of the Asia-Pacific Economic Cooperation (APEC) forum was seen as a significant turning point for the Pacific Rim towards a post–Cold War era, while by 1991, America's transpacific trade had become 1/3rd greater than its transatlantic trade. A consensus began to emerge that Asia would form a significant part of the future and no longer be economically outpaced by America, especially after the 2008 financial crisis and Great Recession.

In 2011, United States Secretary of State Hillary Clinton announced the beginning of "America's Pacific Century" under the ambit of a broader shift in American foreign policy known as the Pivot to Asia. Over time, the concept of a Pacific Century has become intertwined with various developments in the broader neighborhood of Asia and the Indo-Pacific, such as the desire of some Indo-Pacific countries to contain China; America has a history of working against other powers achieving regional dominance in the Pacific stretching back to the 19th century, and so tensions between America and China for dominance in the region have become increasingly relevant. This has led to discussion around a potential "Indo-Pacific Century" instead.

== See also ==
- Asian Century
