= Post-Western era =

Conjectured era without Western dominance

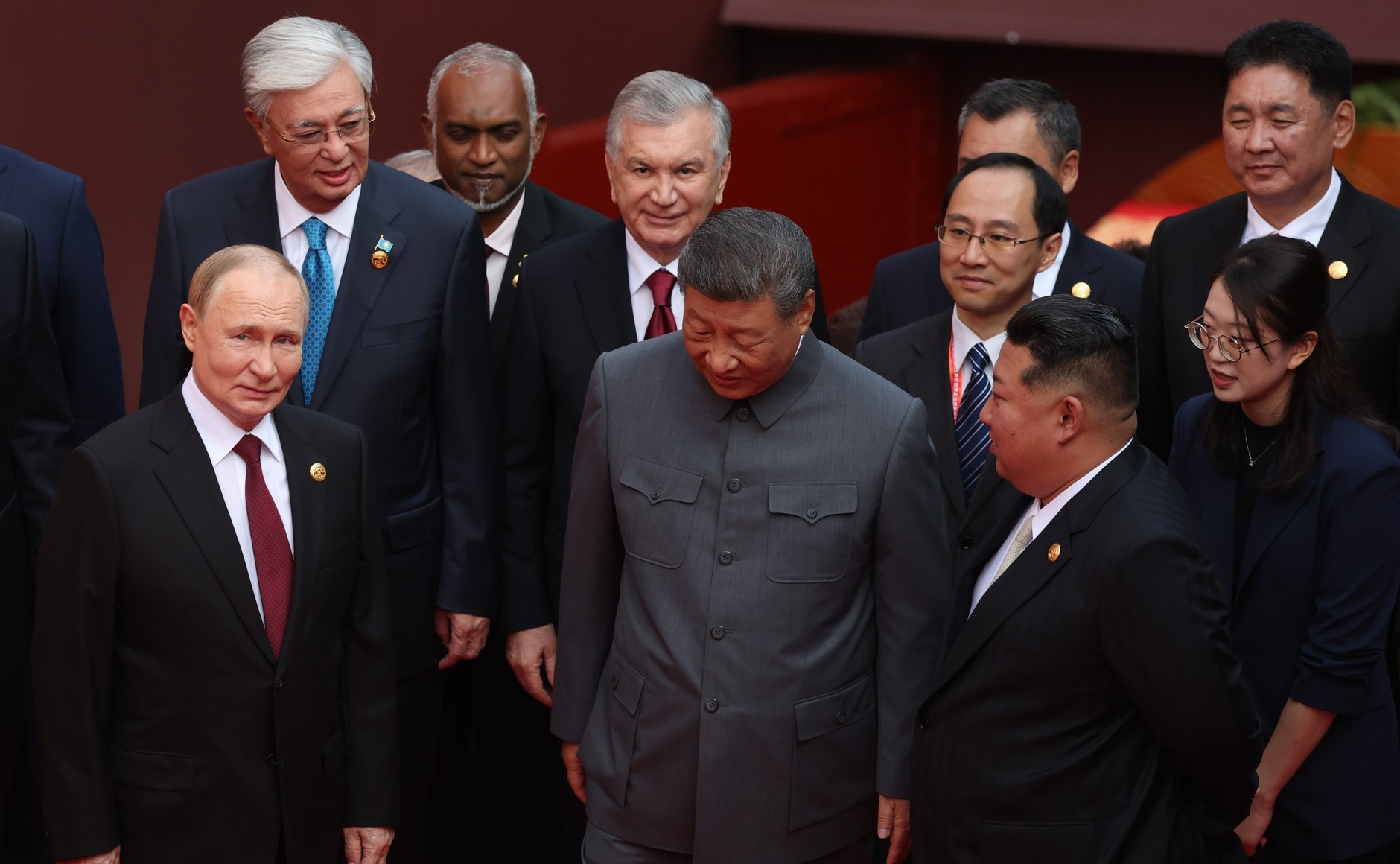
World leaders attending the 2025 China Victory Day Parade. The post-Western era is often conjectured to be one dominated by Asian powers such as China.

The post-Western era, considered by some to be a post-American era, is a conjectured time period starting around the 21st century or afterward in which the West is no longer dominant, and other civilizations (particularly Asian ones) gain power. In the context of rising Asian powers (sometimes as part of a broader Global East) or a rising Global South, the terms Easternization and Southernization respectively are sometimes applied (analogous to Westernization).

Proponents often argue in favor of a post-Western era by pointing out Western abuses of power during the colonial and post-colonial eras, while opponents argue that Western values and civilization are pivotal to human progress and an orderly world, and that a post-Western world might not honor them to the same extent as the West has.

== History ==
=== Debated start dates for a post-Western era ===
The Russo-Ukrainian War was noted to have demonstrated the emergence of some features of a post-Western world order during its major escalation in the 2020s, as the West was unable to rally Global South nations to support Ukraine despite Western solidarity, in what was seen as various countries prioritizing their own interests and a blow to the rules-based world order. The COVID-19 pandemic and the fall of Afghanistan to the Taliban in the early 2020s have also been identified as possible starting points for a post-American era. Some columnists believe that the Gaza war that started in 2023 created further doubts about the West maintaining leadership of the world order, as Southern countries alleged a double standard by the West resulting in the genocide of Gazans.

== Debated causes ==
=== The West ===
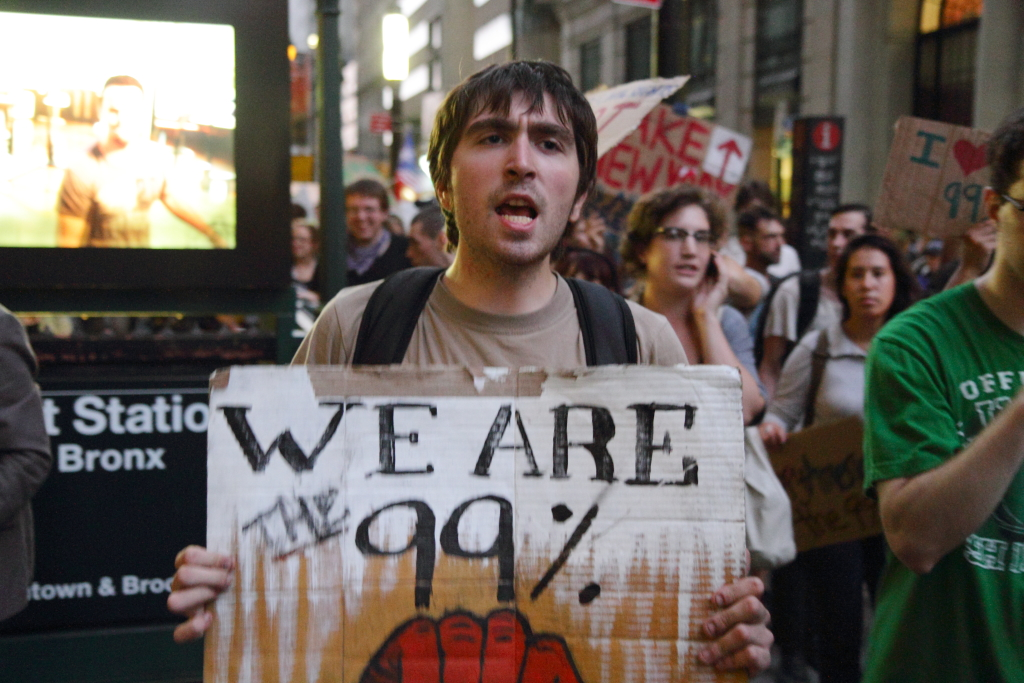
A protester at an Occupy Wall Street protest, an American movement against economic inequality and corporate greed from 2011

In some sense, Europe itself has been argued to be increasingly post-Western, as it has successfully integrated a previously fractious and conflict-ridden group of countries into the European Union and into institutions that command respect for certain values such as democracy. With the acceptance in the rest of the world of Western systems, Europe has become increasingly open to mixing with and acknowledging its influences from other civilizations.

The West has a significantly aging population, with the cost of care associated with the elderly along with decreasing standards of living for those on a median income and other negative economic factors creating the possibility of a decline in Western military and economic power. Opposition by some in the West to various forms of globalization, which are perceived to have spurred on economic inequality and primarily be for the benefit of a global elite, has also created a decline in desire within the West to fully engage with the rules-based order.

Some debate has emerged within the West around how it should manage its relations with other parts of the world to best transition into a post-Western era, with some calling for the West to maintain internal solidarity around its values, while others call for the West to less stringently uphold its values in its foreign relations so as to better integrate with and potentially influence the increasingly influential non-Western nations.

=== The non-West ===
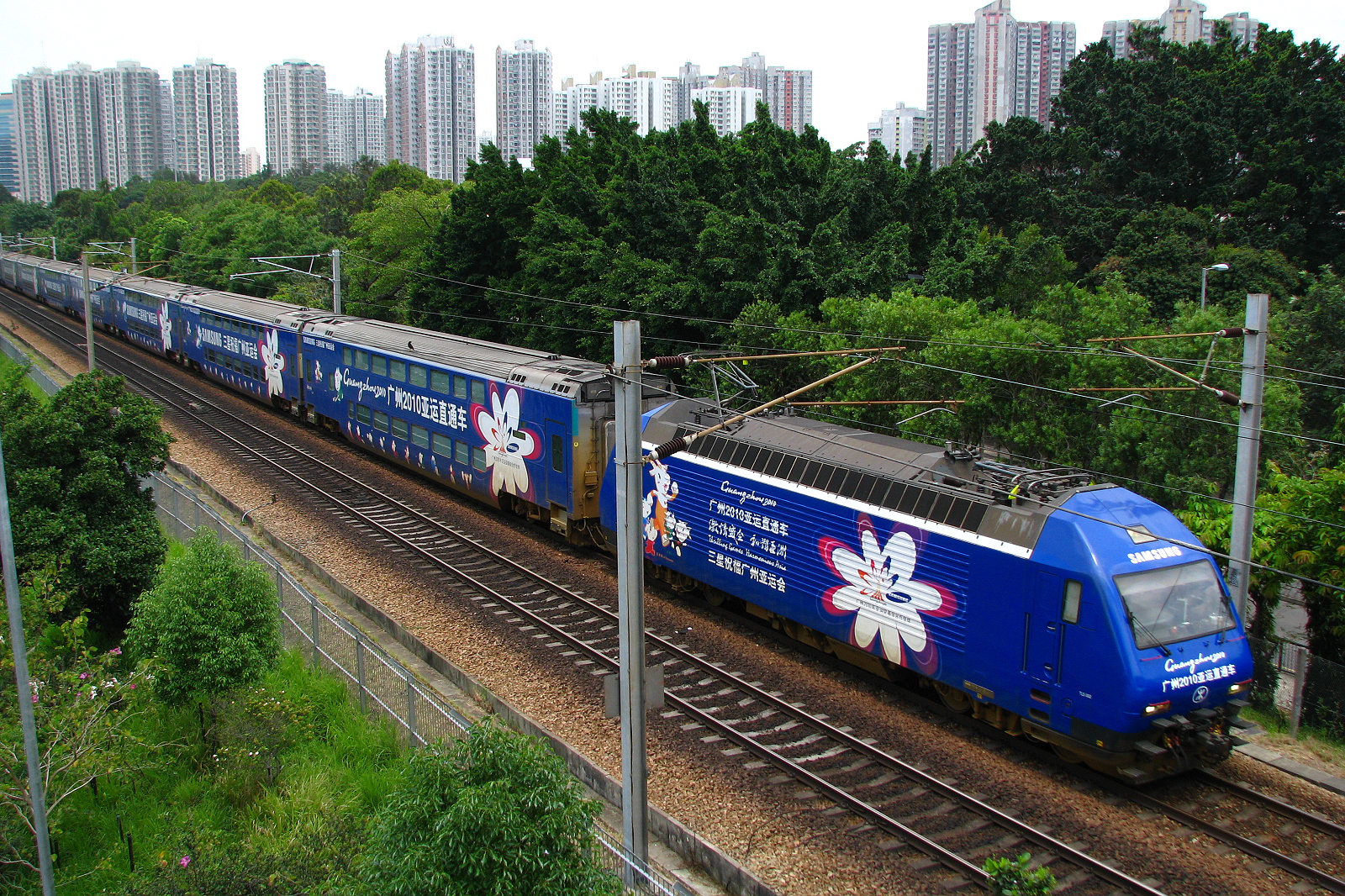
An advertisement for China's 2010 Asian Games on the MTR KTT train that runs from mainland China through Hong Kong. China has increasingly incorporated e-sports and technology into its Asian Games events.

Various factors are said to indicate the decline of Western power and potentially Western values around the world. Asia's youth population has grown significantly relative to the West, with countries such as China acquiring more technological capabilities that can influence the world and potentially be used to reduce individuals' abilities to express their individual rights and/or share power with other individuals in a democratic form of government (see Techno-nationalism).

South–South cooperation has become more discussed, with the developing world trading more within itself than with OECD countries since 2013. By 2050, one projection shows that the world's economic center of gravity may lie between India and China.

Authoritarian non-Western nations have increasingly sought to reshape global institutions to reduce human rights enforcement upon themselves.

India has come to exemplify a kind of neutral, self-interested model among non-Western countries during the Russo-Ukrainian War, demonstrating a desire to move towards a multipolar world where it can work with multiple partners. It has also shown a decreasing interest in full democracy and pluralism, as seen in the rise of Hindu nationalism and increasing attacks upon political opponents of the Indian government.

Civilizational exceptionalism has increasingly been used as a rationale by non-Western countries to carve out space for themselves on the world stage and to justify domestic authoritarianism.

== Impact on global issues ==
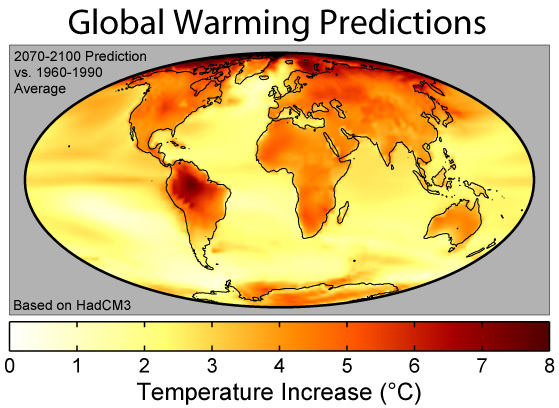

=== Climate change ===
Some post-Western advocates believe that non-Western countries can do a better job than the West in terms of addressing climate change, referencing climate change's origins in various actions taken by the West. Western voices have debated how to address climate change in an era where the West is less likely to lead or be able to create cooperation with non-Western countries.

=== Christianity ===
Christianity's decline in the West has been argued by some to be contributing to what they see as the West's declining ability to enforce its values both within itself and in the wider world.

Christianity's strong historical identification with the West has also become increasingly relevant, as Christians seek to modify their promotion of the religion in a way which can better reach non-Western peoples, and as the religion increasingly grows in the Global South in a form that comes in some conflict with Western-style Christianity. Over time, more Western Christians have come to the conclusion that the spread of Christianity need not be strongly paired with Western culture or values to be successful or beneficial. There has also been some debate around how Western Christians should engage with or protect non-Western Christians, particularly in the context of religious repression of non-Western Christians.

=== Migration ===
Postcolonial migration to Western countries has been described as "super-diverse", raising questions around how the migrants can be assimilated and what it means for the world order. Internal migration has also become a notable topic in countries such as China.

=== Sport ===
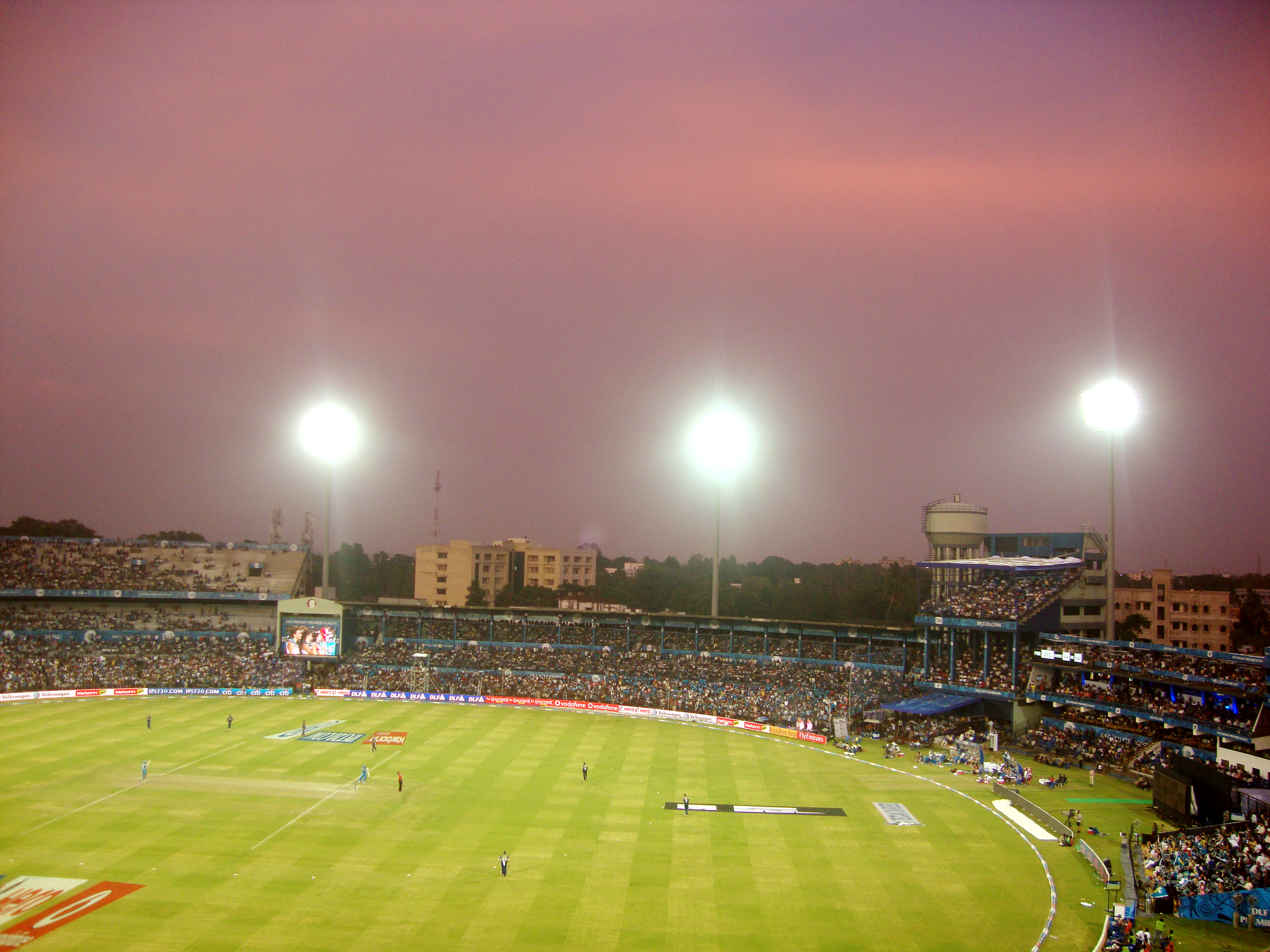
The Indian Premier League, the second-most valued sports league in the world in terms of per-match media rights fees

Though many modern sports came from the West and were originally dispersed through the world via colonialism, there is now an increasing tendency of former colonies to dominate these sports' organizational apparatuses. For example, India has been noted for becoming the dominant power in world cricket, a sport which it had been introduced to during British rule, through its ability to use its large population and market to earn vast revenues through the Indian Premier League and the commercial appeal of the T20 format (see also: Cricket in South Asia). It now generates over 80% of international revenue for the sport.

== See also ==
- American exceptionalism
- Anti-Western sentiment
- Postmodernism
- Second Cold War
