= First island chain =

First chain of archipelagos in East Asia

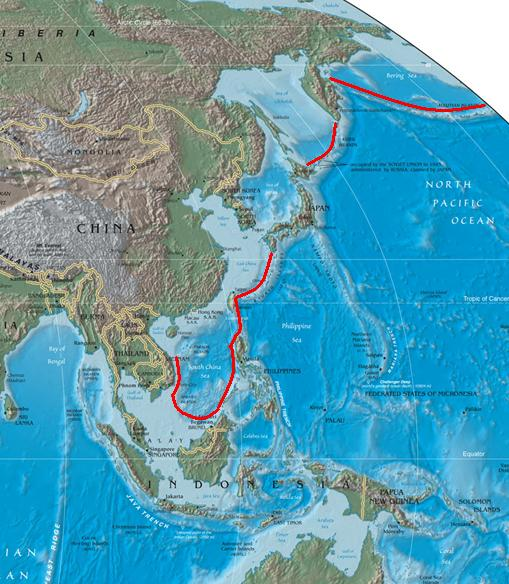
The first island chain perimeter (marked in red).

The first island chain is the first string of major Pacific archipelagos out from the East Asian continental mainland coast. It is principally composed of the Kuril Islands, the Japanese archipelago, the Ryukyu Islands, Taiwan (Formosa), the northern Philippines, and Borneo, extending all the way from the Kamchatka Peninsula in the northeast to the Malay Peninsula in the southwest.

The first island chain is one of three island chain doctrines within the island chain strategy of US foreign policy. It is considered a strategic military barrier to accessing the wider Pacific Ocean given the relative shallowness of waters to the west of the first island chain, which has important implications for submarine detection.

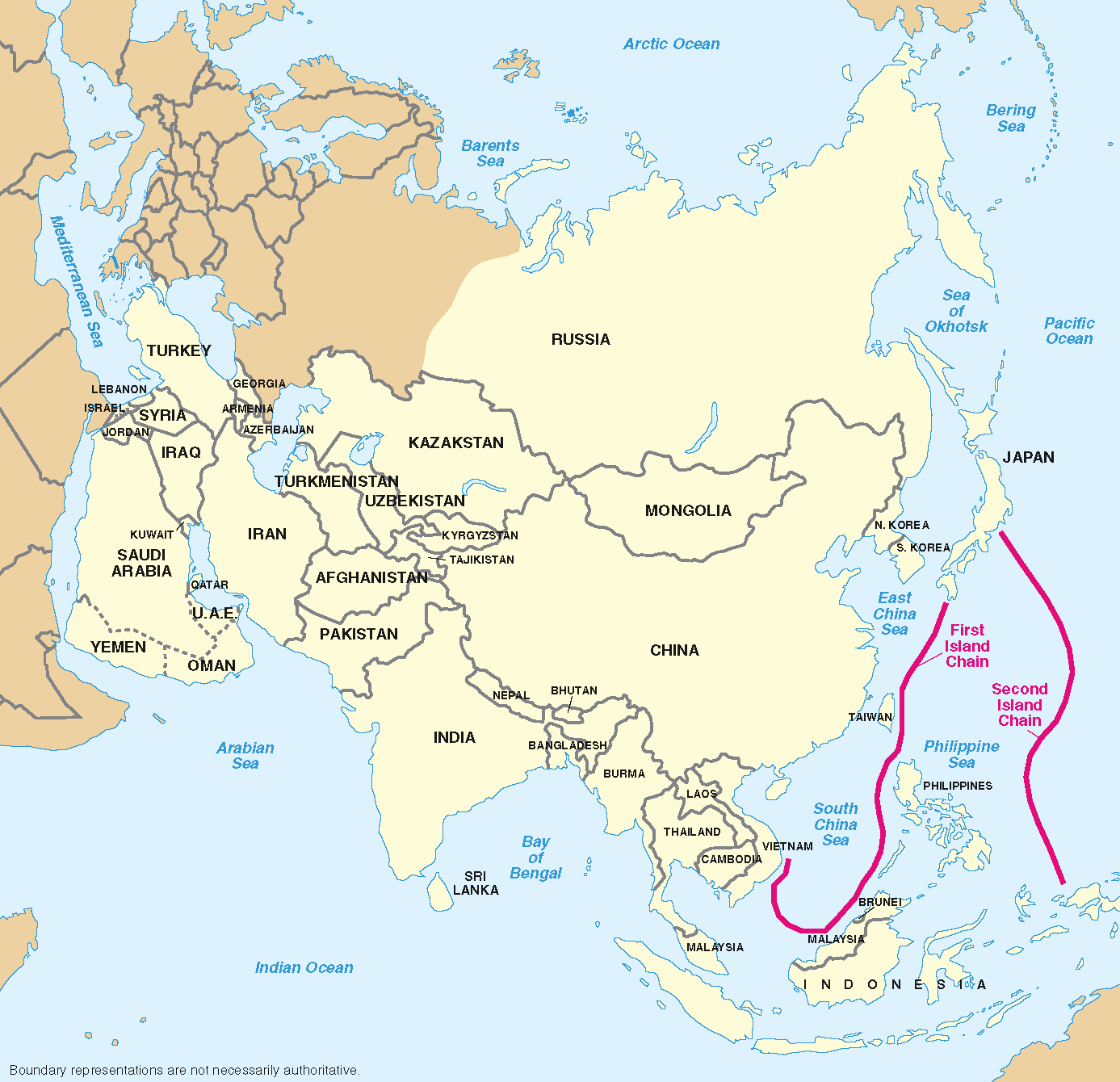
First and second island chains

Much of the first island chain is roughly situated in waters claimed by the People's Republic of China (PRC). These include the South China Sea, within the disputed nine-dash line, as well as the East China Sea west of the Okinawa Trough.

== Strategic value ==
=== China ===
PRC military strategists view the first island chain as part of a cordon sanitaire by the US and its allies, intended to encircle the country and limit its strategic depth and maritime security. The first island chain is often cited as a natural barrier and perceived constraint to the PRC's access to the Pacific Ocean. Within the first island chain, the PRC's access to the South China Sea is viewed as crucial for its navy, as the Yellow Sea and East China Sea are considered too shallow for clandestine submarine operations. Control over Taiwan and its deeper eastern waters would provide the People's Liberation Army Navy's ballistic missile submarines with less detectable access to the wider Pacific where they would serve as an important component of a credible second strike capability for the PRC.

According to a 2018 United States Department of Defense report to Congress, the People's Liberation Army's Anti-Access/Area Denial military capabilities aimed at the first island chain are its most robust. The report also stated that the People's Liberation Army Navy's ability to perform missions beyond the first island chain is "modest but growing as it gains experience operating in distant waters and acquires larger and more advanced platforms."

=== Japan ===
Around 2009, Japanese military strategist Toshi Yoshihara and Naval War College professor James R. Holmes suggested the American military could exploit the geography of the first island chain to counter the People's Liberation Army Navy build-up. The Cabinet of Japan has also passed defense white papers emphasizing the threat posed by the People's Liberation Army Navy in the first island chain.

In the later years of the 2010s, Japan started deploying military assets to Yonaguni and its other islands to counter China's presence along that area of the first island chain.

Japan's strategic position in the first island chain began with US-Japan joint efforts to counter Soviet expansion. The Japan Self-Defense Forces currently plays the role of protecting US military bases and preserving military strength in East Asia. As for Japan's Territorial Protection Self-Defense Forces, which mainly rely on islands in southern Japan adjacent to the Yellow Sea and the East China Sea, Japan has military advantages in anti-submarine, air defense and sea mine technologies.

In 2026, Japan and the US agreed to expand joint military training across the first island chain.

=== Philippines ===
In 2021, Lloyd Austin, on behalf of the United States, thanked his counterpart in the Philippines Delfin Lorenzana for retaining the 70-year-old visiting forces agreement between the two nations. In 2023, four new bases were announced in the Philippines.

=== South Korea ===
South Korea has been described as an anchor along the first island chain. In 2025, a United States Forces Korea commander stated that US forces on the Korean Peninsula will expand their scope of operations to prepare for a potential defense of Taiwan.

=== Taiwan ===
In the first island chain, Taiwan is considered of critical strategic importance. It is located at the midpoint of the first chain and occupies a strategic position. The 2025 National Security Strategy noted Taiwan's strategic location dividing "Northeast and Southeast Asia into two distinct theatres". Submarine detection and tracking is less difficult on Taiwan's western coast where the waters are shallower than on Taiwan's eastern coast.

=== United States ===
US General Douglas MacArthur pointed out that before World War II, the US protected its western shores with a line of defense from Hawaii, Guam, to the Philippines. However, this line of defense was attacked by Japan with the Pearl Harbor bombing of 1941, thereby drawing the US into the war. The US subsequently launched the air Raid on Taipei (called Taihoku under Japan's empire) and launched the atomic bombings of Hiroshima and Nagasaki. The WW2 victory allowed the US to expand its line of defense further west to the coast of Asia, and thus the US controlled the first island chain. Between the end of WW2 and the Korean War, MacArthur praised Taiwan, located at the midpoint of the first island chain, as an 'unsinkable aircraft carrier'.

In April 2014, the United States Naval Institute (USNI) assessed that the first island chain is the most effective point to counter any Chinese invasion. The US could not only cut off the People's Liberation Army Navy from entering the western Pacific, but also predict where they may move before trying to break through in the first place. The US and first island chain countries are able to coordinate because of the US military's freedom of navigation in the first chain block. A June 2019 article published by the United States Naval Institute (USNI) called for the navy to establish and maintain a blockade around the first island chain if the US was go to war with China.

Andrew Krepinevich argued that an "archipelagic defense" of the countries that make up the first island chain would make up a big part of the implementation of the national defense strategy of 2018. A 2019 report by the Center for Strategic and Budgetary Assessments "proposes a U.S. military strategy of Maritime Pressure and a supporting joint operational concept, “Inside-Out” Defense, to stabilize the military balance in the Western Pacific and deny China the prospect of a successful fait accompli." The first island chain plays a central role in the report. In 2020, the United States Marine Corps started shifting its tactics in conjunction with the United States Navy to be deployed along or near the first island chain. In 2021, the United States Marine Corps announced a goal of three additional Pacific-based regiments. The 2025 National Security Strategy noted the need "to deter adversaries and protect the First Island Chain."

== See also ==
- AirSea Battle
- Bamboo Curtain
- Island chain strategy
- Power projection
- United States foreign policy toward the People's Republic of China
