= East Asian foreign policy of the Obama administration =

Obama administration's shift of US foreign policy priority to the Asia-Pacific region

U.S. president Barack Obama's East Asia Strategy (2009–2017), also known as the Pivot to Asia, represented a significant shift in the foreign policy of the United States since the 2010s. It shifted the country's focus away from the Middle Eastern and European sphere and allowed it to invest heavily and build relationships in East Asian and Southeast Asian countries, especially countries which are in close proximity to the People's Republic of China (PRC) either economically, geographically or politically to counter its rise as a rival potential superpower.

Additional focus was placed on the region with the Obama administration's 2012 "Pivot to East Asia" regional strategy, whose key areas of actions are: "strengthening bilateral security alliances; deepening our working relationships with emerging powers, including with China; engaging with regional multilateral institutions; expanding trade and investment; forging a broad-based military presence; and advancing democracy and human rights." A report by the Brookings Institution states that reactions to the strategy were mixed, as "different Asian states responded to American rebalancing in different ways".

Since 2017, the United States has readjusted its policy toward China through the Free and Open Indo-Pacific strategy, originated by the government of Shinzo Abe. This replaced the US concept of the "Pivot to Asia" or "Asia-Pacific" with the "Indo-Pacific strategy".

== The Pivot ==
Previously, under the administrations of Bill Clinton and George W. Bush, naval and air weapons systems were deployed to Guam and Japan, and cooperation began with Singapore by constructing an aircraft carrier facility at Changi Naval Base. "The Bush administration assigned an additional aircraft carrier to the Pacific theater and the Pentagon announced in 2005 that it would deploy 60 percent of U.S. submarines to Asia." Spending for United States Pacific Command (PACOM) remained high during the anti-insurgency campaigns in Iraq and Afghanistan.

Though other areas of the world remained important to American foreign policy, Obama pursued a "pivot" to East Asia, focusing the U.S.'s diplomacy and trade in the region. China's continued emergence as a major power was a major issue of Obama's presidency; while the two countries worked together on issues such as climate change, the China-United States relationship also experienced tensions regarding territorial claims in the South China Sea and the East China Sea. In 2016, the United States hosted a summit with the Association of Southeast Asian Nations (ASEAN) for the first time, reflecting the Obama administration's pursuit of closer relations with ASEAN and other Asian countries. After helping to encourage openly contested elections in Myanmar, Obama lifted many US sanctions on Myanmar. Obama also increased US military ties with Vietnam, Australia, and the Philippines, increased aid to Laos, and contributed to a warming of relations between South Korea and Japan. Obama designed the Trans-Pacific Partnership as the key economic pillar of the Asian pivot. President Donald Trump withdrew the US signature from Trans-Pacific Partnership in January 2017. As a result the agreement could not be ratified and did not enter into force. Obama made little progress with relations with North Korea, a long-time adversary of the United States, and North Korea continued to develop its WMD program.

Also known as "Pivot to Asia", the American military and diplomatic "pivot", or "rebalance", toward Asia became a popular buzzword after Hillary Clinton authored "America's Pacific Century," in Foreign Policy. Clinton's article emphasizes the importance of the Asia-Pacific, noting that nearly half of the world's population resides there, making its development vital to American economic and strategic interests. She states that "open markets in Asia provide the United States with unprecedented opportunities for investment, trade, and access to cutting-edge technology. Our economic recovery at home will depend on exports and the ability of American firms to tap into the vast and growing consumer base of Asia. Strategically, maintaining peace and security across the Asia-Pacific is increasingly crucial to global progress, whether through defending freedom of navigation in the South China Sea, countering the nuclear proliferation efforts of North Korea, or ensuring transparency in the military activities of the region's key players." The "pivot" strategy, according to Clinton, will proceed along six courses of action: strengthening bilateral security alliances; deepening America's relationships with rising powers, including China; engaging with regional multilateral institutions; expanding trade and investment; forging a broad-based military presence; and advancing democracy and human rights.

Kevin Rudd, then-Australian prime minister of Australia, believed that Obama's "pivot" or rebalancing toward the Asia-Pacific region was appropriate. He said: "without such a move, there was a danger that China, with its hard-line, realist view of international relations, would conclude that an economically exhausted United States was losing its staying power in the Pacific." With the United States now fully invested in Asia, Rudd wrote that Washington and Beijing must create long-term cooperative strategies that accommodate each other's interests. Doing this would significantly reduce miscalculation and the likelihood of conflict. Rudd maintained that the United States' rebalancing is not purely a military one but rather "part of a broader regional diplomatic and economic strategy that also includes the decision to become a member of the East Asia Summit and plans to develop the Trans-Pacific Partnership, deepen the United States' strategic partnership with India, and open the door to Myanmar." Beijing may not welcome the pivot, but Rudd believed China, whose military academies read Clausewitz and Morgenthau and respect strategic strength, understands it.

Robert S. Ross, an Associate at the John King Fairbank Center for Chinese Studies at Harvard University, argued that the "pivot" toward China is creating a self-fulfilling prophecy, whereby U.S. policy "unnecessarily compounds Beijing's insecurities and will only feed China's aggressiveness, undermine regional stability, and decrease the possibility of cooperation between Beijing and Washington." The United States is minimizing long-term diplomatic engagement and inflating the threat posed by Chinese power when it should really be recognizing China's inherent weaknesses and its own strengths. "The right China policies would assuage, not exploit, Beijing's anxieties, while protecting U.S. interests in the region."

Aaron L. Friedberg, professor of politics and international affairs at the Woodrow Wilson School of Public and International Affairs at Princeton University, believes U.S. strategy toward China has coupled engagement with balancing. "The engagement half of this strategy has been geared toward enmeshing China in global trade and international institutions, discouraging it from challenging the status quo, and giving it incentives to become what the George W. Bush administration termed a 'responsible stakeholder' in the existing international system." The other half attempts to maintain the balance of power, deter aggression, and mitigate any attempts of coercion. Friedberg believes more emphasis has been placed on the former and not the latter. "The problem with the pivot is that to date it lacks serious substance. The actions it has entailed either have been merely symbolic, such as the pending deployment of a small number of U.S. marines to Australia, or have involved simply the reallocation of existing air and naval assets from other theaters."

The PRC's Defense Ministry has cited the pivot as a consideration in their own continued buildup. China has also cited the American example for other actions, such as the establishment of their Air Defense Identification Zone. Former Chinese State Councilor, Dai Bingguo, suggested to Hillary Clinton: "Why don't you 'pivot out of here?'" Former president Hu Jintao stated:

[The United States has] strengthened its military deployments in the Asia-Pacific region, strengthened the US-Japan military alliance, strengthened strategic cooperation with India, improved relations with Vietnam, inveigled Pakistan, established a pro-American government in Afghanistan, increased arms sales to Taiwan, and so on. They have extended outposts and placed pressure points on us from the east, south, and west.

On 4 June 2013, the Asia-Pacific Strategy Working Group at the American Enterprise Institute (AEI) released Securing U.S. Interests and Values in the Asia-Pacific, a memorandum to President Barack Obama and the United States Congress. The president of the United States can achieve his goals in the Asia-Pacific, the memorandum argues, by working with Congress to employ a comprehensive, long-term strategy that satisfies the following four conditions: promoting economic integration and liberalization; strengthening alliances and security partnerships; reinforcing U.S. military posture in the Asia-Pacific; draw on the full range of U.S. diplomatic and national power.

Prem Mahadevan, senior researcher at the Center for Security Studies (CSS) at ETH Zurich, argued that two complementing circumstances in the Asia-Pacific have precipitated the pivot: "The security dynamic in East Asia is two layered; one layer consists of regional actors pursuing their own agendas, while the second consists of global influences which are propelling China into a geopolitical contest against the United States. On a grand strategic level, both sets of dynamics feed into one another." Consequently, newly commissioned ships and fifth generation aircraft are being prioritized for the Pacific theater of U.S. military operations to maintain the balance of power. "It is expected that when the 'rebalancing' or 'pivot' of forces from the Atlantic to the Pacific is complete, 60 percent of the U.S. Navy will be based in the Pacific – a 10 percent increase from current levels. In effect, the theater would gain one additional U.S. aircraft carrier, seven destroyers, ten littoral combat ships and two submarines, plus reconnaissance assets such as EP3 spy planes."

In contrast the permanent bases and other infrastructure of the Cold War, the pivot will use rotational deployments to host nation facilities. James F. Amos has said that by avoiding a few large bases, the American forces will be a harder target for ballistic missiles. The power of the pivot will be boosted by American arms sales to the region.

Senator John McCain moved to block funding for the realignment, citing a lack of a solid plan.

The pivot took a hit from the United States federal government shutdown of 2013 as Obama was forced to remain in Washington and unable to attend APEC Indonesia 2013. Commander of Pacific Air Forces Herbert J. Carlisle has acknowledged that resources have not been committed to the pivot due to other American commitments and Budget sequestration in 2013. Katrina McFarland, assistant secretary of defense for acquisition, said that the pivot was being reconsidered in light of the budget pressures.

Think tanks such as the Singapore Forum have insisted on the “geoeconomic nature” of the pivot to Asia, and the dynamic interplay with China’s own global ambitious. Nicolas Firzli has argued that the establishment of the Asian Infrastructure Investment Bank constitutes to a large extent an economic response to a geopolitical "encirclement strategy" aimed at containing China: "To contain China, the US sought new defence and trade alliances across Asia from Baku to Borneo, with limited success. Despite Washington's insistent nudging, Tokyo and Seoul have been reluctant to strengthen their bilateral military and economic ties. But as the 'liberal hawks' of Washington DC rather clumsily deployed this encirclement strategy, the Chinese leadership did not stay idle. And one of their ripostes was in international finance," observing that the "establishment of a new supranational financial institution based in Beijing needn't trigger vain geopolitical rivalries. China and the West can work successfully together to build a more prosperous, equitable economic order across the Asia-Pacific region."

== Countries ==
=== East Asia ===
==== China ====
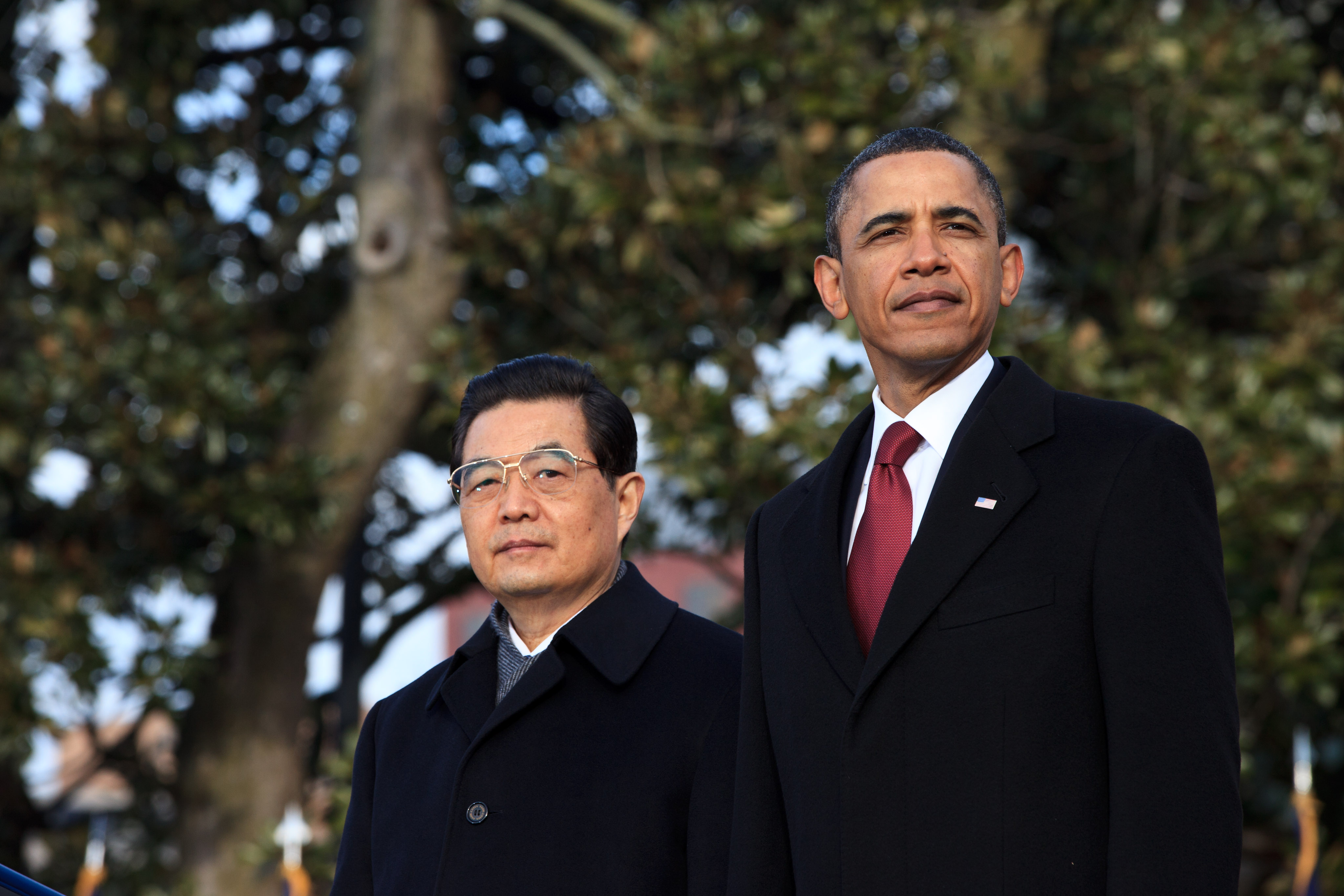
Obama and Chinese leader Hu Jintao during Hu's state visit to the United States in January 2011.

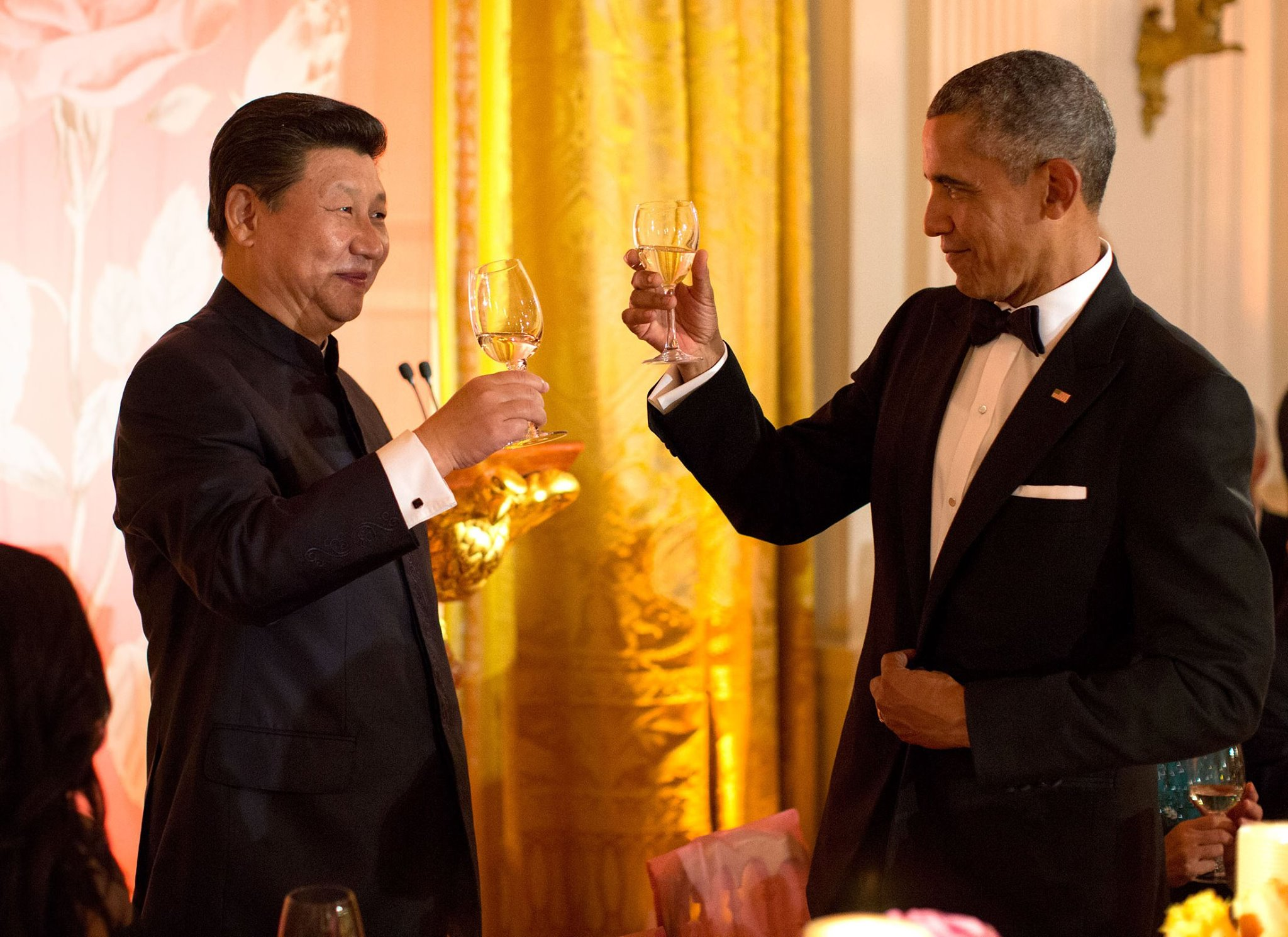
Obama and Chinese leader Xi Jinping during Xi's state visit to the United States in September 2015.

In a speech given on February 13, 2009, US Secretary of State Hillary Clinton said that "some believe that China on the rise is, by definition, an adversary", but "to the contrary, we believe that the United States and China can benefit from and contribute to each other's successes. It is in our interests to work harder to build on areas of common concern and shared opportunities." Clinton left on her first foreign policy tour (to Asia) on 15 February 2009 including scheduled stops in Japan, China, South Korea, and Indonesia. Joining her on this trip was Special Envoy for Climate Change Todd Stern.

It had been earlier reported by U.S. officials and media that Vice President Joe Biden could emerge as the figure to spearhead U.S.–China relations. Clinton was reported to have fought hard to obtain the China file and lead the comprehensive dialogue with China. The Financial Times noted an inter-agency rivalry between the State Department and Treasury Department over the management of the U.S.-China relationship.

Prior to leaving on her tour of Asia, Clinton remarked, "We see the Chinese economic relationship as essential to our own country, so we're going to consult and work in a way that will be mutually beneficial." Clinton attracted criticism, though, when she suggested that U.S. criticism of the human rights record of China should not be allowed to "interfere" with cooperation with Beijing on resolving global economic, environmental, and security crises. Less than a week later, a report signed by Clinton criticizing the PRC on its human rights violations in 2008 was released by the U.S. State Department. In response, Beijing issued a report accusing Washington of utilising human rights concerns in China for political gain and suggesting that Americans were turning a 'blind eye' to their own violations of human rights.

On April 1, 2009, Obama and Hu Jintao announced the establishment of the high-level U.S.–China Strategic and Economic Dialogue co-chaired by Hillary Clinton and Timothy Geithner on the U.S. side and Dai Bingguo and Wang Qishan on the Chinese side.

On May 16, 2009, Obama announced his intention to nominate Jon Huntsman Jr., then Republican Governor of Utah to fill the position of Ambassador to China. Huntsman was the only ambassador in the Administration to be personally announced by the President. The United States Senate needed to confirm the appointment. Huntsman said that he and President Barack Obama believe that the United States' relationship with China is its most important in the world. Huntsman's nomination had garnered positive reactions from both China and the U.S. Senate.

Treasury Secretary Timothy Geithner visited China from 31 May – 2 June 2009 and had discussions with top Chinese political and economic leaders. He had the opportunity to meet with Hu Jintao, Premier Wen Jiabao and Vice Premier Wang Qishan, and delivered a speech at Peking University, where he studied.

Commerce Secretary Gary Locke and Energy Secretary Steven Chu traveled to China from July 14 to July 17, 2009.

During the Obama administration, the US signed more bilateral agreements with China than it had during any other US administration, with a focus on bilateral efforts to address climate change.

==== Japan ====
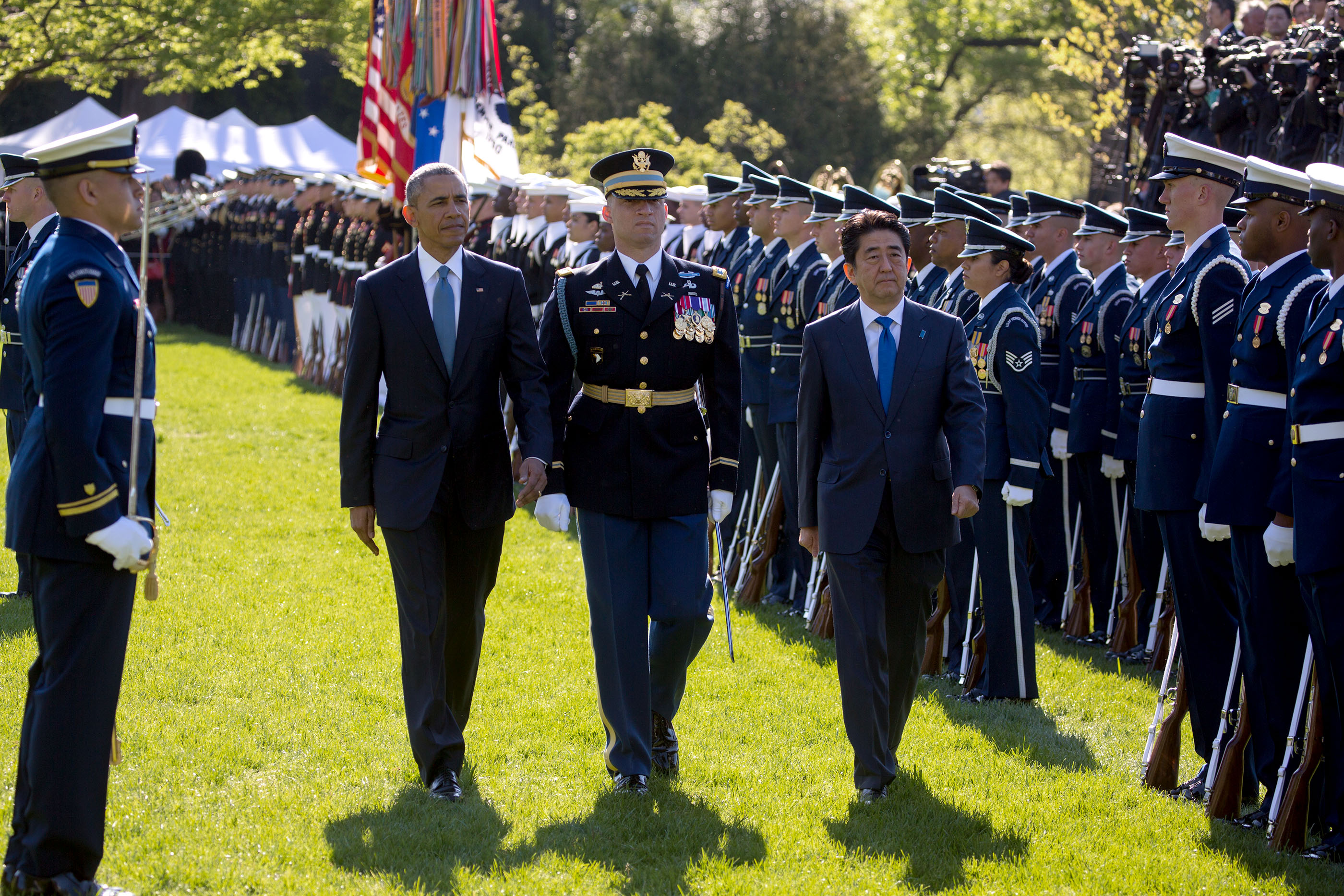
Obama and Japanese Prime Minister Shinzo Abe, April 2015.

Japan was a major area of engagement for the East Asian foreign policy of the Obama Administration. In her inaugural tour of East Asia, U.S. Secretary of State Hillary Clinton reassured Japanese officials of Japan's centrality in the network of American alliances. In a response to the 2011 Tōhoku earthquake and tsunami, the United States initiated Operation Tomodachi to support Japan's disaster relief following the natural disaster earning gratitude from Japan's Minister of Defense, Toshimi Kitazawa, who while visiting the USS Ronald Reagan, thanked its crew for its assistance as part of Operation Tomodachi saying, "I have never been more encouraged by and proud of the fact that the United States is our ally."

==== Korea ====
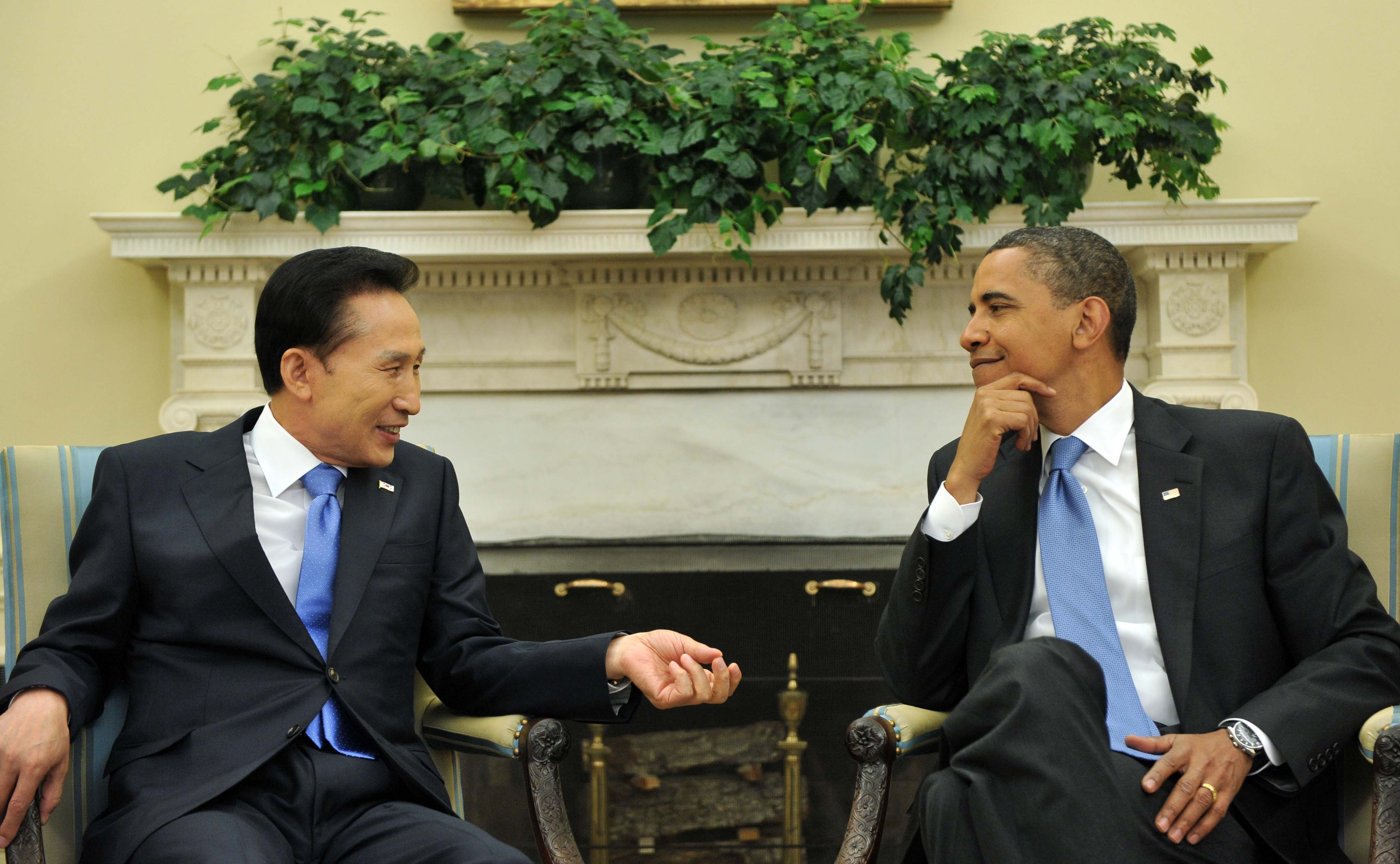
Obama and South Korean President Lee Myung-bak, June 2009.

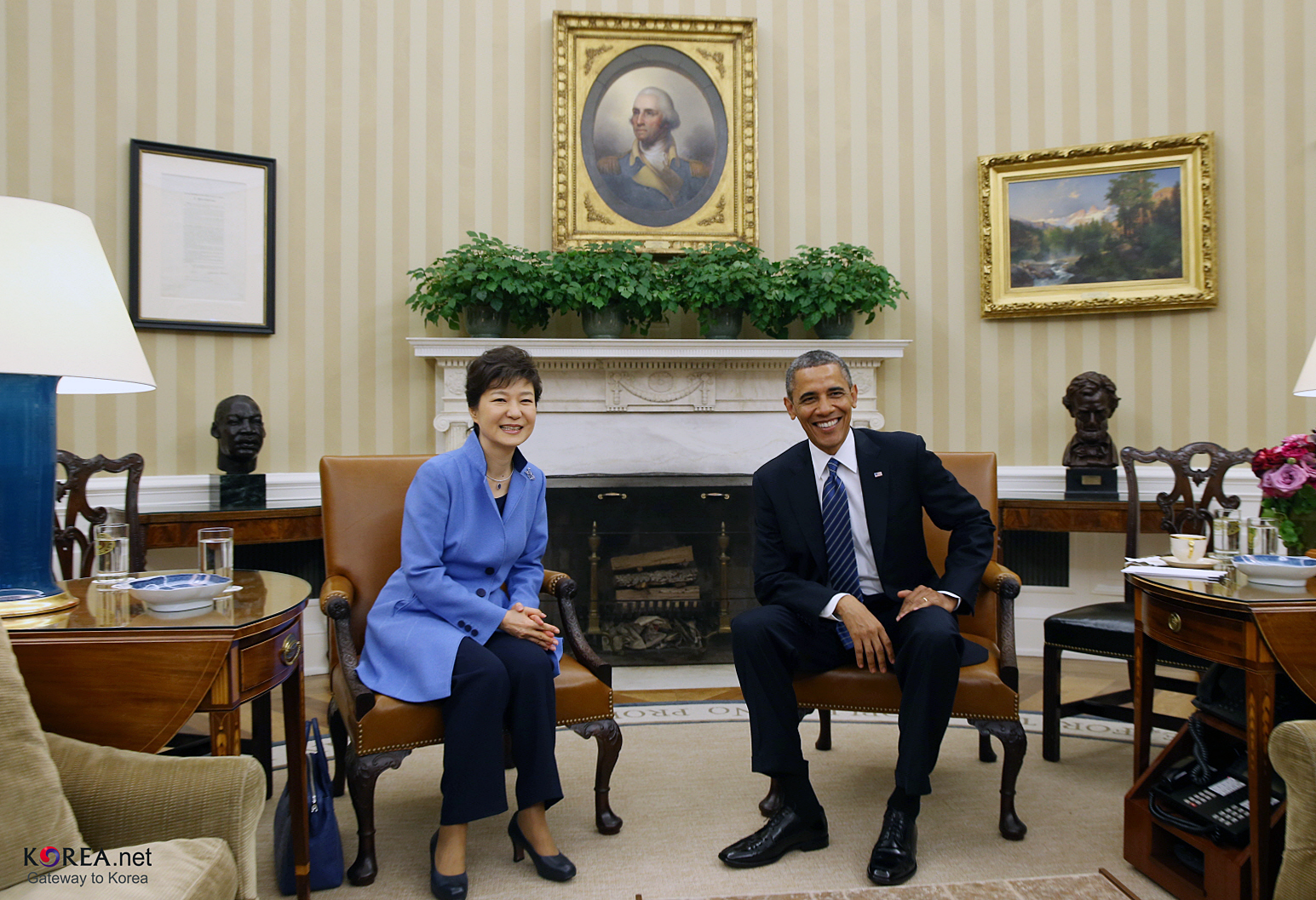
Obama and South Korean President Park Geun-hye, May 2013.

Not long after Obama took office as President of the United States on 20 January 2009, North Korea elbowed its way back onto the international stage after a period of relative quiescence during the waning months of the Bush administration. But in spite of a pledge, made during George W. Bush's last few weeks as president, to denuclearize, North Korea drew accusations of planning a new long-range intercontinental ballistic missile test weeks after Obama was sworn in. The accusations, which came mostly from Japan, the Republic of Korea, and the United States, were countered by Pyongyang's insistence that the alleged rocket launch preparation identified by U.S. spy satellite observation was actually groundwork for a North Korean satellite launch.

Obama, in solidarity with Japanese Prime Minister Taro Aso, warned North Korea against "provocative" gestures such as a rocket launch. The United States Navy has declared its readiness to use missile defense systems to shoot down a North Korean missile if one is launched, either offensively or as a test, with Admiral Timothy Keating saying that the fleet awaited the president's order. However, North Korea warned on 9 March 2009, that such a shootdown would "precisely mean a war".

Secretary of State Hillary Clinton stirred controversy on 19 February 2009, when she admitted that the Obama administration was concerned over a possible succession crisis in North Korea, in reference to the recent apparent illness of reclusive leader Kim Jong-il. While on a tour of East Asia over the following days, Clinton expressed the Obama administration's desire to engage in negotiations with the North Korean government to seek nuclear disarmament for the socialist state.

On 20 February 2009, the U.S. State Department, led by Clinton, appointed Stephen Bosworth as Special Representative for North Korea Policy. Bosworth embarked on a mission to East Asia in early March 2009 and reportedly met with Chinese, Russian, Japanese, and South Korean officials to discuss the North Korean nuclear situation.

Following unannounced nuclear warhead and missile testing by North Korea in late May 2009, Obama's State Department expressed disapproval, calling the actions a violation of a 2006 United Nations Security Council resolution. After Pyongyang announced its intention to terminate the 1953 armistice ending hostilities in the Korean War on 28 May the South Korea–United States Combined Forces Command went to Watchcon II, the second-highest alert level possible.

In 2010, two more major incidents with North Korea would occur under the Obama Administration: the sinking of a South Korean Navy Ship that actuated new rounds of military exercises with South Korea as a direct military response to sinking and the Bombardment of Yeonpyeong prompting the US Navy aircraft carrier USS George Washington to depart for joint exercises in the Yellow Sea with the Republic of Korea Navy, in part to deter further North Korean military action. In light of the geopolitical developments with North Korea, the Obama Administration has dubbed the U.S.-South Korean alliance as a "cornerstone of US security in the Pacific Region."

The United States has increased its military presence on the East Asian mainland. President Bush withdrew 40 percent of U.S. troops from South Korea after "recognizing that South Korean forces required less U.S. assistance to manage the threat from North Korea ..." The Obama administration has reversed this trend. The last three years have seen the United States oversee its largest military exercise with South Korea since the Korean War, along with an increased troop presence to buttress the 38th Parallel.

=== Southeast Asia ===
==== Laos ====
As part of Secretary Clinton's trip to East Asia in July 2012, she visited Vientiane on July 11. John Foster Dulles had been the last Secretary of State to visit Laos, 57 years earlier. During the latest visit, the two countries discussed bilateral and regional issues, including the Lower Mekong Initiative and ASEAN integration. The issue of unexploded ordnance dating back to the Vietnam War was also a topic of discussion during the visit.

==== Myanmar (formerly Burma) ====
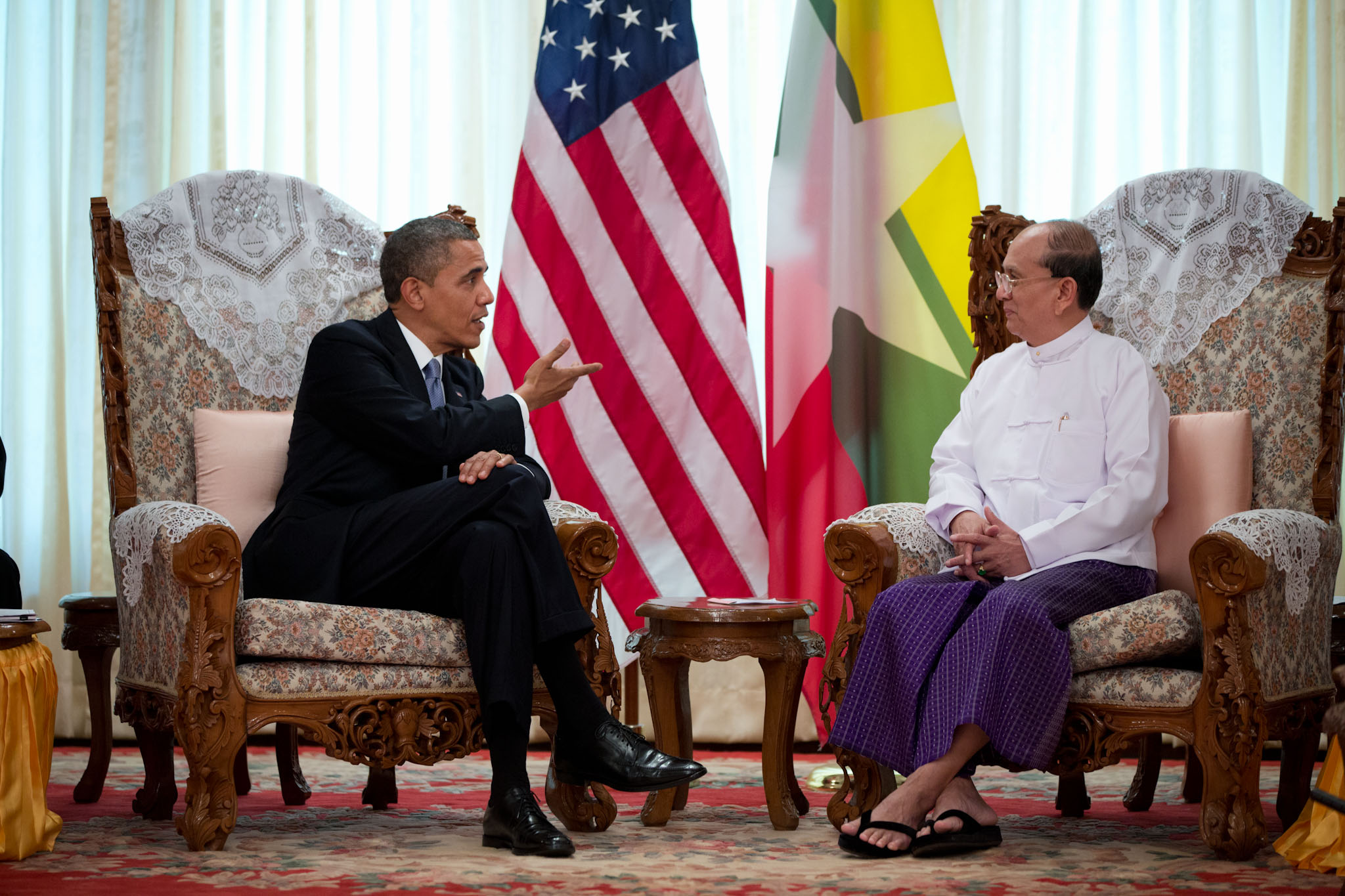
Obama and Burmese President Thein Sein, November 2012

The Obama administration initially continued longstanding American reticence in dealing with Union of Myanmar after taking over in January 2009, preferring to prioritize broader security threats like Afghanistan, Iran, North Korea, and Pakistan. Susan E. Rice, the United States Ambassador to the United Nations, called the junta government's hold over Myanmar, formerly Burma, "one of the most intractable challenges for the global community". Secretary of State Hillary Clinton claimed that the Obama administration was "looking at what steps we might take that might influence the current Myanmar government and ... looking for ways that we could more effectively help the Myanmar people", though she echoed Rice's pessimism in noting the junta's historical isolationism and disregard for economic sanctions.

At the urging of Aung San Suu Kyi and the US's East Asian partners, the US held the first formal meetings with the junta in late 2009.

In November 2011, Obama spoke with Aung San Suu Kyi on the phone where they agreed to a visit by Secretary of State Clinton to Myanmar. Obama is expected to meet Myanmar President Thein Sein at the Sixth East Asia Summit. Clinton made a two-day visit from 1 December 2011. Barack Obama visited Myanmar on 18 November 2012, becoming the first sitting U.S. president to do so. Obama also visited Aung San Suu Kyi in her home.

==== Philippines ====
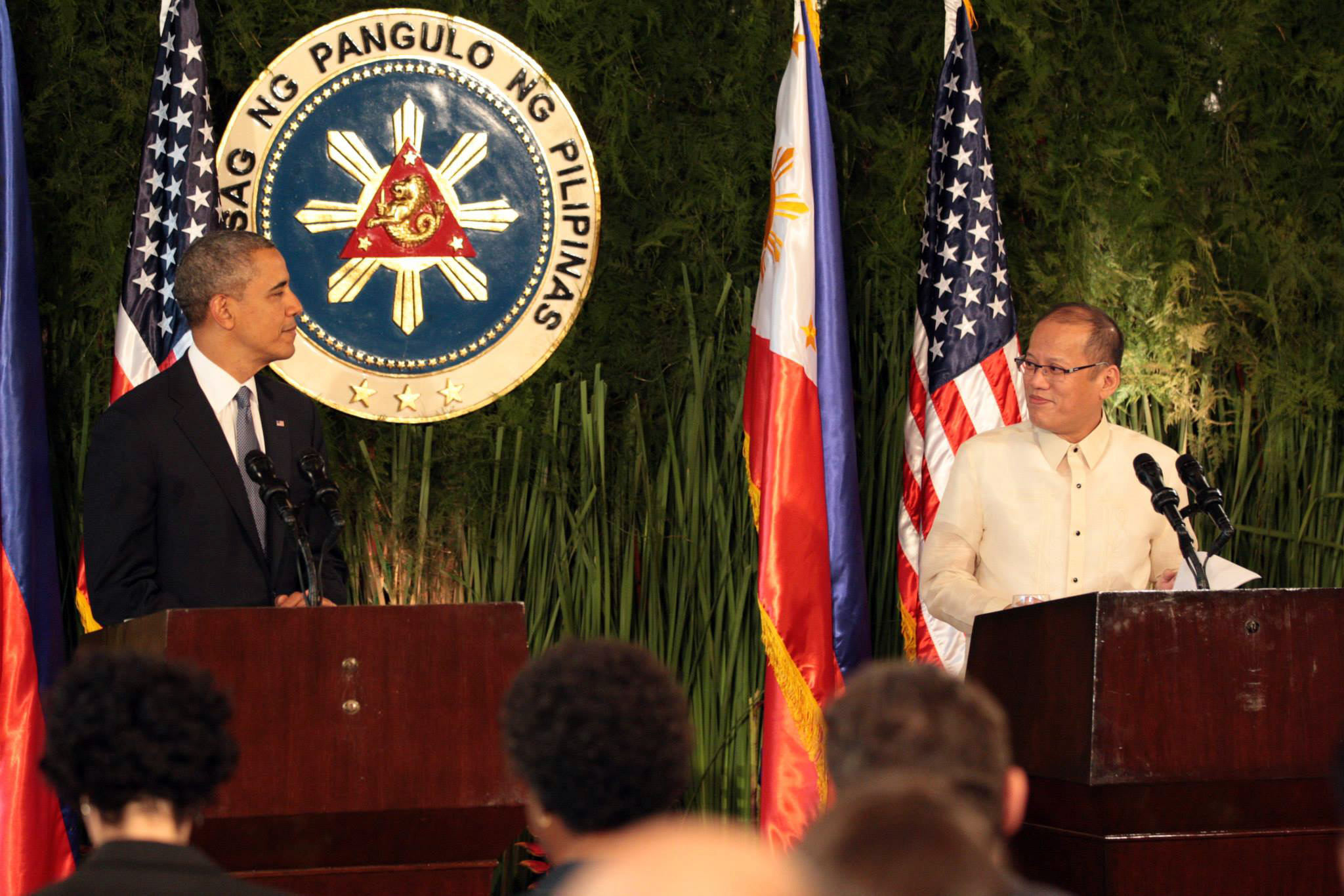
Obama with Filipino President Benigno Aquino III, April 2014

U.S. Assistant Secretary of State for East Asian and Pacific Affairs Kurt M. Campbell said in January 2011 that the United States will help boost the capacity of the Philippines to patrol their own waters, including the Spratly Islands.

The 1951 mutual-defense treaty was reaffirmed with the November 2011 Manila Declaration. United States Chief of Naval Operations Admiral Jonathan Greenert suggested that LCS or surveillance aircraft may be deployed to the Philippines. And the Philippines is considering the proposal. These "rotational deployments" will help replace some of the American presence in the area that was given up when the permanent American bases in the Philippines were closed under President Bush.

In 2012, the Philippines and the United States conducted joint military exercises. As of 2012, a U.S. military contingent of 600, including Navy Seals and Seabees are stationed "indefinitely" in the Southern Philippines, in a declared non-combatant role to assist the Armed Forces of the Philippines in operations against the al-Quaida-linked Abu Sayyaf terrorist group primarily on the island of Basilan in western Mindanao and the Sulu islands, in particular Jolo, a long-time stronghold of Abu Sayyaf. During the visit by President Benigno Aquino III to Washington DC, on July 7, 2012, the US-Philippine Society was launched. It is a non-profit independent organisation tasked for generating awareness about the Philippines in the US. The last board meeting was conducted by the society on January 24, 2013.

The Scarborough Shoal standoff with China and the ongoing Spratly Islands dispute has caused the Philippines to consider stronger military ties with the United States. In 2012, a senior Philippine defense official said that as long as they have prior clearance from the Philippine government, American troops, warships and aircraft could once again use their former naval and air facilities of Subic Bay Naval Base and Clark Air Base. In 2013, Foreign Secretary, Albert del Rosario clarified that, due to constitutional constraints, establishment of a US military facility could only be allowed if it would be under the control of the Philippine military. The deal will reportedly include shared access to Philippines military but not civilian facilities.

During a 2013 visit to the Philippines, Secretary of Defense Ashton Carter said that the main security issues that the USA was working with the Philippines were:

- Maritime domain awareness,
- building up the capacities of the Armed Forces of the Philippines,
- and counter terrorism.

In April 2014, a ten-year pact (EDCA – Enhanced Defence Co-operation Agreement) was signed between the U.S. president, Barack Obama and the Philippine president, Benigno Aquino III, allowing United States to increase military presence in the Philippines.

After President Rodrigo Duterte formally assumed the office on June 30, 2016, the US-Philippine relations began to sour. The drift between the Duterte and Obama relationship began when the U.S. president expressed his concern over human rights issues on President Duterte's "War on Criminality and Drugs". This intervention and President Duterte's choice of words while speaking about President Obama during a press conference, where he infamously called him "a son of a whore" resulted in a canceled meeting between the two leaders during the 2016 ASEAN summit held in Laos.

A few weeks after, Duterte suggested American special forces to cease its operations and leave Mindanao. He cited the killings of Muslim Filipinos during a U.S. pacification campaign in the early 1900s, which he said were at the root of the long restiveness by minority Muslims in the largely Catholic nation's south. It was only during his official visit to Vietnam last September 28, 2016 when he explicitly expressed that he wants an end to the Philippines' joint military exercises with the United States, saying the upcoming scheduled war games will be the last under his term, while adding that he will continue to uphold the Philippines' treaties with the US.

A crowd of Muslims were attending a speech by Duterte where he accused America of bringing terrorism to themselves, saying that terrorism is not the result of the Middle East. He railed against the actions undertaken in the Middle East by the USA. Duterte blamed the war on Mindanao on colonialist Christianity being brought to the Philippines in 1521 by Ferdinand Magellan saying there was peace before that, and that they were made to fight their "Malay brother" by Christians.

==== Thailand ====
On 13 April 2009, the United States Department of State condemned violence by protesters, calling on the protesters to use their freedom of assembly in a peaceful manner.

==== Vietnam ====
The United States has increased its military presence in Indochina. In the 1990s, Washington rebuffed Vietnam's requests for more defense ties. This changed in 2010 when Secretary of State Hillary Clinton, for the first time since the Vietnam War, called for an American–Vietnamese strategic partnership. "Since then, the U.S. Navy has held annual exercises with the Vietnamese navy, and in 2011, the two countries signed a memorandum of understanding on defense cooperation."

The Obama Administration has attempted to capitalize on the much evolved relations between the United States and Vietnam since the end of the Vietnam War. The formal normalization of relations occurred in 1995, subsequently expanding under both the Clinton and Bush Administrations with dialogues and agreements on human rights, civil aviation, and free trade. In August 2010, the U.S. Department of Defense and Vietnam's Ministry of Defense held the first round of high-level defense talks, known as the Defense Policy Dialogue. Secretary of State has visited the country three times during her tenure, discussing such topics as regional integration, North Korea, Burma, cyber security and maritime rights in the South China Sea.

== See also ==
American geostrategy related

- AirSea Battle
- Blue Team (U.S. politics)
- U.S. Strategic Competition with China
- Foreign policy of the Barack Obama administration
- Geostrategy in Central Asia
- Second Cold War

Chinese geostrategy related

- Belt and Road Initiative
- Chinese century
- List of disputed territories of China
- String of Pearls (Indian Ocean)

Bi and multilateral relations

- Quadrilateral Security Dialogue
- Post–Cold War era
- Malabar (naval exercise)
- China-United States relations
- India-United States relations
- Japan-United States relations
- Philippines–United States relations
