= AAAD =

AAAD may refer to:

- Academy of Arts, Architecture and Design in Prague
- Aromatic L-amino acid decarboxylase
- All-arms Air Defence, a component of part of Anti-aircraft warfare
- Anti-access/area denial, a military strategy
