= Air Defense Identification Zone (East China Sea) =

Area designated by the People's Republic of China

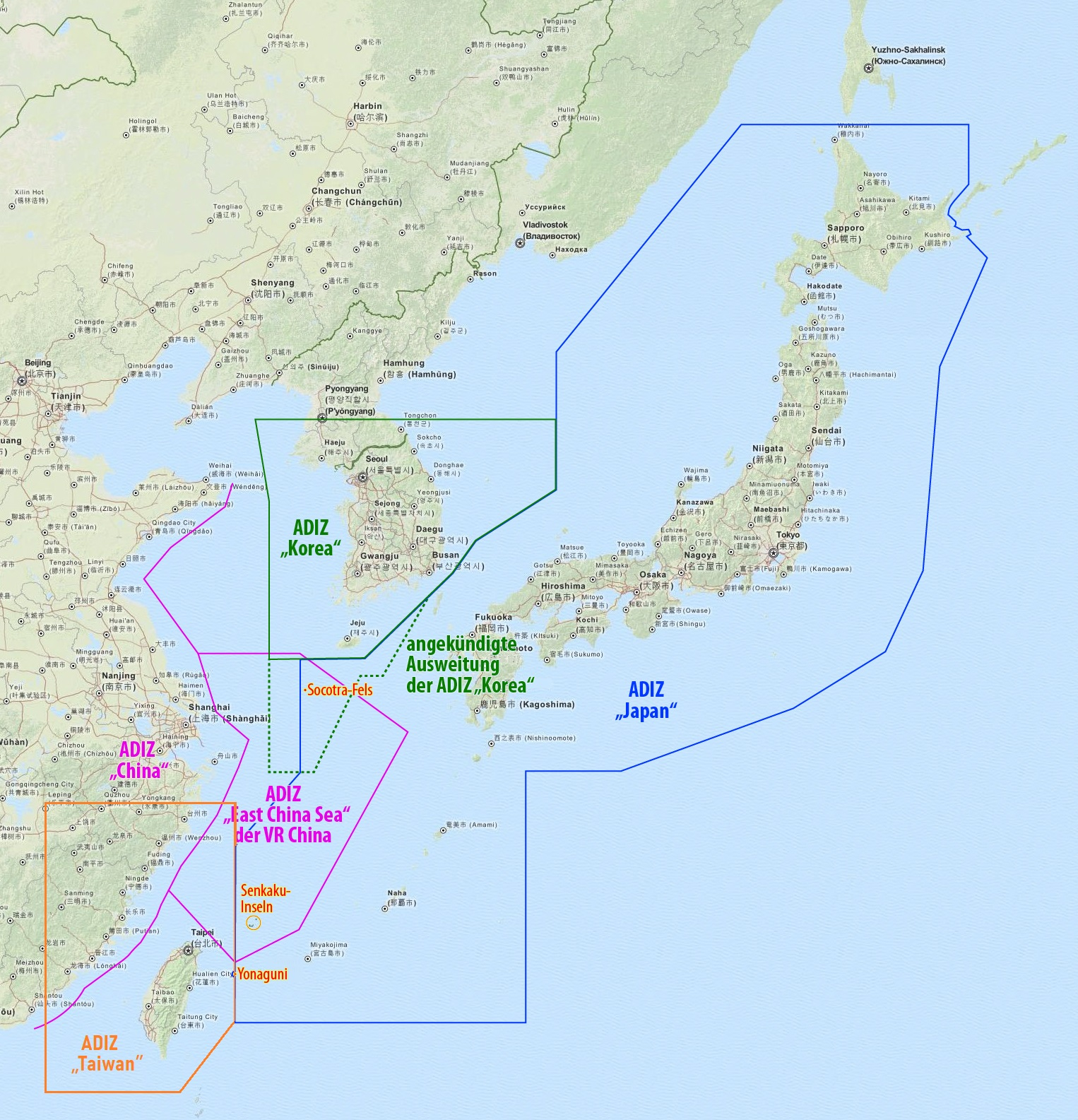
The East China Sea Air Defense Identification Zone as shown in pink boundaries

The East Sea Air Defense Identification Zone (ADIZ, Chinese: 东海防空识别区) is an air defense identification zone issued by the People's Liberation Army covering most of the East China Sea where the People's Republic of China announced that it was introducing new air traffic restrictions in November 2013. The area consists of the airspace from about, and including, the Japanese controlled Senkaku Islands (which are known as the Diaoyu Islands in mainland China and are claimed by mainland China as well as Taiwan) north to South Korean-claimed Socotra Rock (known as Suyan Jiao in China). About half of the area overlaps with a Japanese ADIZ, while also overlapping to a small extent with the South Korean and Taiwanese ADIZ. When introduced the Chinese initiative drew criticism as the ADIZ overlapped with the ADIZ of other countries, imposed requirements on both civilian and military aircraft regardless of destination, and included contested maritime areas.

== History ==
The first ADIZ was established by the United States in 1950 when it created a joint North American ADIZ with Canada, citing the legal right of a nation to establish reasonable conditions of entry into its territory. The U.S. does not apply its ADIZ procedures to foreign aircraft not intending to enter U.S. airspace and does not recognize the right of a coastal nation to apply its ADIZ procedures to foreign aircraft not intending to enter their national airspace.

South Korea's ADIZ was established in 1951 during the Korean War by the United States Air Force. It currently does not cover Socotra Rock, known to Koreans as Ieodo. Korean Defence Minister Kim Kwan-jin said that South Korea would consider extending its ADIZ in light of the extent of the Chinese ADIZ but an announcement of a change was postponed after a meeting with the United States ambassador.

Japan's ADIZ was established in 1969, which covers most of its exclusive economic zone. Japan makes no demands on aircraft flying through, unless they are landing in Japan. The ADIZ was revised in the same year that the U.S.-Japan Okinawa Reversion Treaty provided for the return of the Ryukyu Islands and the Daitō Islands to Japan in 1972. Japan's ADIZ was created by the United States Armed Forces during the post-WWII Allied occupation, with the western border at 123° degrees east. This resulted in only the eastern half of Yonaguni Island being part of Japan's ADIZ and the western half being part of Taiwan's ADIZ. On 25 June 2010, Japan extended its ADIZ around Yonaguni 22 km westwards. This led to an overlapping with sections of Taiwan's ADIZ. However, Taiwanese foreign affairs officials said that it does not make any difference, as an understanding has been reached between the two parties on how to handle it. According to China Network Television on 24 November 2013, China and Russia do not recognize Japan's ADIZ.

The People's Republic of China announced the establishment of what it called its East China Sea Air Defense Identification Zone on 23 November 2013 defining an ADIZ as a zone that allowed a coastal state to "identify, monitor, control and react to aircraft entering this zone with potential air threats." Despite several international protests, China's move received broad domestic support.

According to a 2011 study of the justifications for establishing an ADIZ, at that time there had not yet been a "recorded instance of protest" against the initial establishment of an ADIZ.

The Chinese Air Force Command Academy began planning for an ADIZ after the Hainan Island incident and in May 2013 had suggested an ADIZ that covered China's exclusive economic zone, but this was expanded during review by the PLA to the current area.

On 25 July 2015, Lao Airlines flight QV916 was turned back by the Chinese. The Chinese MoD has said that the aircraft was prevented from entering Chinese territory due to an inadequate flight plan, and that the incident had nothing to do with the ADIZ.

== Administration and monitoring operations ==
=== Identification rules ===
According to the Chinese Ministry of National Defense, foreign aircraft in the zone will be expected to abide by the following:

- Identification of flight plan. Any aircraft in the zone must report its flight plan to China's Ministry of Foreign Affairs or Civil Aviation Administration.
- Radio identification. Aircraft in the zone must maintain two-way radio communication and respond in a timely and accurate manner to inquiries
- Responder identification. Any aircraft with an Air Traffic Control Radar Beacon System transponder must keep it on during the aircraft's time in the zone
- Sign identification. Any aircraft in the zone must display insignia indicating its nationality and registration clearly, in accordance with international treaties
- Aircraft in the zone should follow instructions. The Chinese military will adopt "emergency defensive measures" in response to aircraft that refuse to follow the instructions.

China announced that the rules were in effect from 10 am on 23 November 2013 Beijing time.

On 26 November the state-controlled People's Daily said that while "freedom of flight" would be respected for "normal" flights, the principle would not apply to "provocative flyover and surveillance activities." On 29 November a Chinese Foreign Ministry spokesman replied to the statement, "You referred many times to ADIZs established by other countries, but there is a difference. For example, an aircraft which is passing through the US ADIZ without entering the sovereign US airspace does not have to notify US authorities," by stating that "different countries have set different rules."

== International reaction ==
=== Japan ===
The weeks prior to the ADIZ announcement, Japanese media complained that Chinese journalists had been ordered to not make any concessionary comments regarding China's territorial claims.

Promptly after the announcement, Japan Air Self-Defense Force sent two F-15 fighter jets to intercept two Chinese aircraft entering the air zone nearby the Senkaku Islands, which is included in the newly announced Chinese ADIZ.

On 25 November, Prime Minister Shinzo Abe said the measures one-sidedly imposed rules set by the Chinese military on all flights in the zone, and violate the freedom to fly above open sea, a general principle under the international law, "the measures by the Chinese side have no validity whatsoever on Japan, and we demand China revoke any measures that could infringe upon the freedom of flight in international airspace. It can invite an unexpected occurrence and it is a very dangerous thing as well." He denounced China's declaration as a dangerous attempt to change the status quo in the East China Sea through coercion, vowed to protect Japan's air and sea space, and demanded that Beijing "revoke any measures that could infringe upon the freedom of flight in international airspace".

Tokyo brought the matter to the International Civil Aviation Organization, a U.N. agency to promote the safe and orderly development of international civil aviation throughout the world. Australia, Britain and the United States supported Japan's proposal, but China reacted sharply against the proposal. Japanese Foreign Minister Fumio Kishida stated that Japan would coordinate closely with the United States, the ROK, and others on demanding a revocation of the ADIZ measures, while describing China as "engaging in profoundly dangerous acts that unilaterally change the status quo". Japanese Defence Minister Itsunori Onodera said that "it's important for both sides to take a calm approach and deal with the situation according to international norms." He also denied Beijing's claim that it scrambled fighter jets in response to Self-Defense Forces aircraft that had entered China's new air defense identification zone, saying "there have been no abnormal situations, such as (Chinese) aircraft suddenly approaching (SDF planes in the ADIZ), as announced by China yesterday". A Japanese official described the Chinese report is a "sheer fabricated story".

=== South Korea ===
South Korea summoned a Chinese diplomat on 25 November to protest the creation of the zone, which includes Korean-claimed Socotra Rock where Korea has built structures. Sources said that Seoul was informed in advance of Chinese plans, however, as Chinese officials stated that with respect to South Korea, "the two sides will solve the issue through friendly consultations and negotiations". South Korea's Ministry of Transport said its airlines would not recognize the Chinese ADIZ. The Koreans said they had launched a joint air and sea military exercise on 3 December to show their "intention to protect our jurisdiction over Ieodo’s waters". South Korea then extended their own ADIZ over the disputed waters.

=== Taiwan ===
Although the ADIZ announced by Beijing overlaps by a relatively small 23 000 square kilometers with the identification zone of Taiwan (Republic of China), official reaction from Taipei was initially muted, leading to protests from the opposition Democratic Progressive Party (DPP) and some academics that President Ma Ying-jeou's government was failing to assert Taiwan's sovereignty. On 29 November caucus leaders of both the DPP and ruling KMT party signed a joint statement calling on President Ma's administration to lodge a "stern protest" with Beijing. On 1 December, the 70th anniversary of the Cairo Declaration, Ma reasserted Taiwan's claim to the Diaoyutai islands and called on affected governments to peacefully negotiate and pursue the "East China Sea Peace Initiative" he had proposed the previous year.

=== United States ===
The U.S. said it would ignore the Chinese ADIZ and disregard Chinese orders, although the Obama administration differed from Japan and South Korea in deciding to advise American commercial airlines to comply with China's demands to avoid an unintended confrontation. The Wall Street Journal on 1 December reported that "the U.S. carriers are filing flight plans with both Japan and China. At the same time, affected routes are being modified to avoid disputed airspace as much as practicable."

A U.S. State Department statement called China's establishment of the zone a "unilateral action [that] constitutes an attempt to change the status quo in the East China Sea," adding that "Freedom of overflight and other internationally lawful uses of sea and airspace are essential to prosperity, stability, and security in the Pacific. We don't support efforts by any State to apply its ADIZ procedures to foreign aircraft not intending to enter its national airspace. The United States does not apply its ADIZ procedures to foreign aircraft not intending to enter U.S. national airspace. We urge China not to implement its threat to take action against aircraft that do not identify themselves or obey orders from Beijing."

Chuck Hagel, then American Secretary of Defense, said that while there was nothing new or unique in establishing an ADIZ, criticized the manner in which China had acted as "unilateral", "immediate" and "without consultation". Then American Vice-president Joe Biden discussed the issue at length with Chinese Communist Party leader Xi Jinping.

The United States sent two B-52 bombers from Guam to fly through the zone on 26 November.

On 29 November 2013, the U.S. Department of State issued a statement titled "China's Declared ADIZ – Guidance for U.S. Air Carriers" that the U.S. government generally expects that U.S. carriers operating internationally will operate consistent with NOTAMs (Notices to Airmen) issued by foreign countries but also stressed that this does not mean U.S. government acceptance of China's ADIZ requirements.

=== Australia ===
Australia summoned the Chinese ambassador in Australia to protest and the Australian Minister for Foreign Affairs issued the following remarks:

The timing and the manner of China's announcement are unhelpful in light of current regional tensions, and will not contribute to regional stability. Australia has made clear its opposition to any coercive or unilateral actions to change the status quo in the East China Sea.

— The Honourable Julie Bishop MP, Australian Minister for Foreign Affairs

=== Philippines ===
The Philippines accused China of trying to transform the area into its "domestic airspace." Filipino aviation official John Andrews warned that China might attempt to establish another ADIZ in the South China Sea, where the two nations have competing claims.

=== Germany ===
Germany said the creation of the zone "raised the risk of an armed incident between China and Japan."

=== France ===
France expressed concerns on the Chinese declaration and called for the parties to stay calm.

=== European Union ===
The European Union's top diplomat, Catherine Ashton, said "[t]his development heightens the risk of escalation and contributes to raising tensions in the region."

=== Others ===
Some Asian airlines and authorities said they would inform China before their airliners entered the contested zone, but would not alter their flight paths or schedules.

Robert E. Kelly, a scholar of East Asian international relations at Pusan National University, suggests that the Communist Party was hoping to boost its own internal legitimacy by appearing to challenge Japan, "the CCP may not want a conflict with Japan, but it’s been telling Chinese youth for more than 20 years that Japan is greatly responsible for the 100 years of humiliation. Now the CCP have to be tough on Japan even if they don’t want to be, because their citizens demand it".

Indian analyst Brahma Chellaney said the Chinese move represented what PRC Rear Adm. Zhang Zhaozhong (mistaken to be "Maj. Gen." in Chellaney's article) called a "cabbage strategy," which involved asserting a claim, launching furtive incursions into the claimed area, and erecting multiple "cabbage-style" layers of security around the contested area to deny rivals access. In Chellaney's view the incursions in turn follow a "salami slicing" strategy whereby each "slice" is thin enough to preclude a dramatic reaction that could become a casus belli on its own, thus casting the burden of starting a war on the encroached upon party.

== Patrol operations ==
Not all regular patrol operations are reported by public media. However, PLAAF and PLANAF have thus far conducted regular patrol operations since the establishment of ADIZ. They have monitored, collected evidence of, identified, and radio-warned foreign military aircraft, according to spokesman Col. Shen Jinke. On 31 January 2014, the first day of Lunar New Year, Chinese media reported that the Chinese Naval Air Force of the East Sea Fleet scrambled two Su-30MKK jet fighters with missiles under wings to inspect, monitor, and expel foreign military aircraft entering the ADIZ. On 1 February, the Japanese Defense Minister Onodera said "While we are aware of the press report, we have no announcement to make as we did not find anything extraordinary to speak of" at a press conference. The Chinese PLA Maj. Gen. Luo Yuan later confirmed that the intruding military aircraft belong(s) to JASDF. He also condemned Japan's provocation during the most important Chinese holidays.

== See also ==
- Air defense identification zone
- AirSea Battle
- East China Sea EEZ disputes
- Flight information region
- List of territorial disputes
