= SOKS =

Soviet nonacoustic submarine detection system

SOKS, or Systemа Obnarujenia Kilvaternogo Sleda (Russian: Система обнаружения кильватерного следа, "wake object detection system"), is a non acoustic submarine detection system created by the Soviet Union. SOKS functions by detecting radionuclides from the nuclear reactor in submarines, chemical signatures, and changes in the refractive index of water in the wake of submarines. It was first installed on the November-class K-14 submarine in 1969.

SOKS was revealed in a 1972 document written by the Central Intelligence Agency Directorate of Science & Technology and declassified in June 2017.
