= Air defense identification zone =

Airspace region unilaterally defined by a country to respond to aircraft

An air defense identification zone (ADIZ) is a region of airspace in which a country tries to identify, locate, and control aircraft in the interest of national security. It is declared unilaterally and may extend beyond a country's territory to give the country more time to respond to possibly hostile aircraft. The concept of an ADIZ is not defined in any international treaty and is not recognized by any international body.

The first ADIZ was established by the United States on December 27, 1950, shortly after President Truman had proclaimed a national emergency during the Korean War. About 20 countries and regions now have such zones, including Canada, India, Japan, Australia, Pakistan, Bangladesh, Finland, Norway, the United Kingdom, the People's Republic of China, South Korea, Taiwan, the United States, Iceland, and Iran. As well, Russia and North Korea have unofficial zones. Usually, such zones cover only undisputed territory, do not apply to foreign aircraft not intending to enter territorial airspace, and do not overlap.

== United States and Canada ==
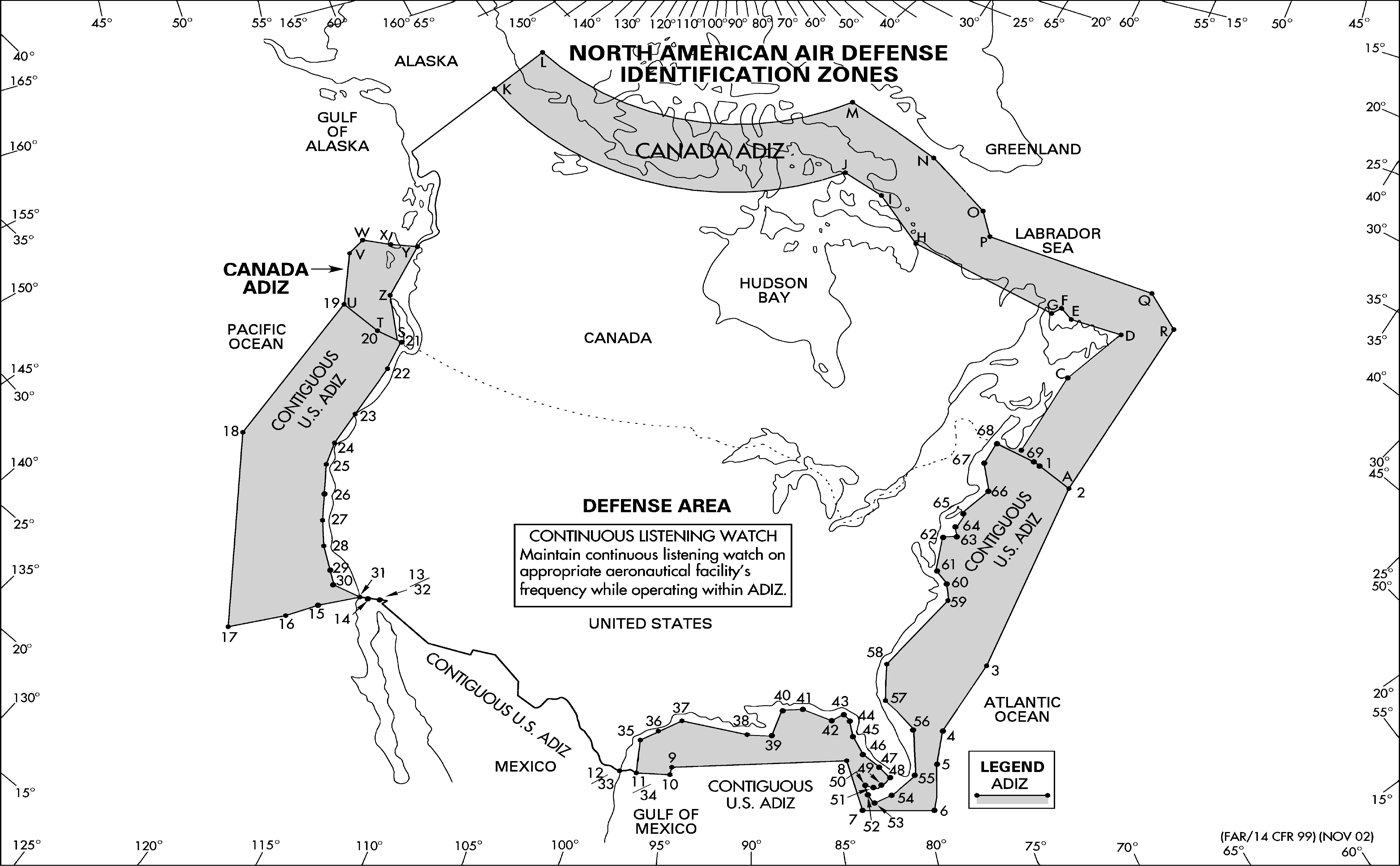
ADIZ boundaries for the United States and Canada as of 2018.

The United States and Canada jointly operate an ADIZ that encompasses their sovereign airspace in North America. The United States maintains two zones in North America, the Contiguous U.S. ADIZ and the Alaska ADIZ, and two more overseas, the Hawaii ADIZ and the Guam ADIZ. Canada operates two other sections of the North American ADIZ, one off the Pacific coast of British Columbia and another that encompasses the Canadian Arctic Archipelago and its Atlantic provinces.

Under US law and policy, the zone applies only to commercial aircraft intending to enter US airspace. An air defense command and control structure was developed in 1950, creating five air defense identification zones around North America. If radio interrogation failed to identify an aircraft in the ADIZ, the Air Force launched interceptor aircraft to identify the intruder visually. The air defense system reached its peak in 1962. With the deployment of the SS-6 ICBM in the Soviet Union, strategic threats shifted overwhelmingly to ICBM attacks, and bomber intrusions were considered to be less of a threat. It applies to aircraft passing through the zone to other countries.

== East Asia ==
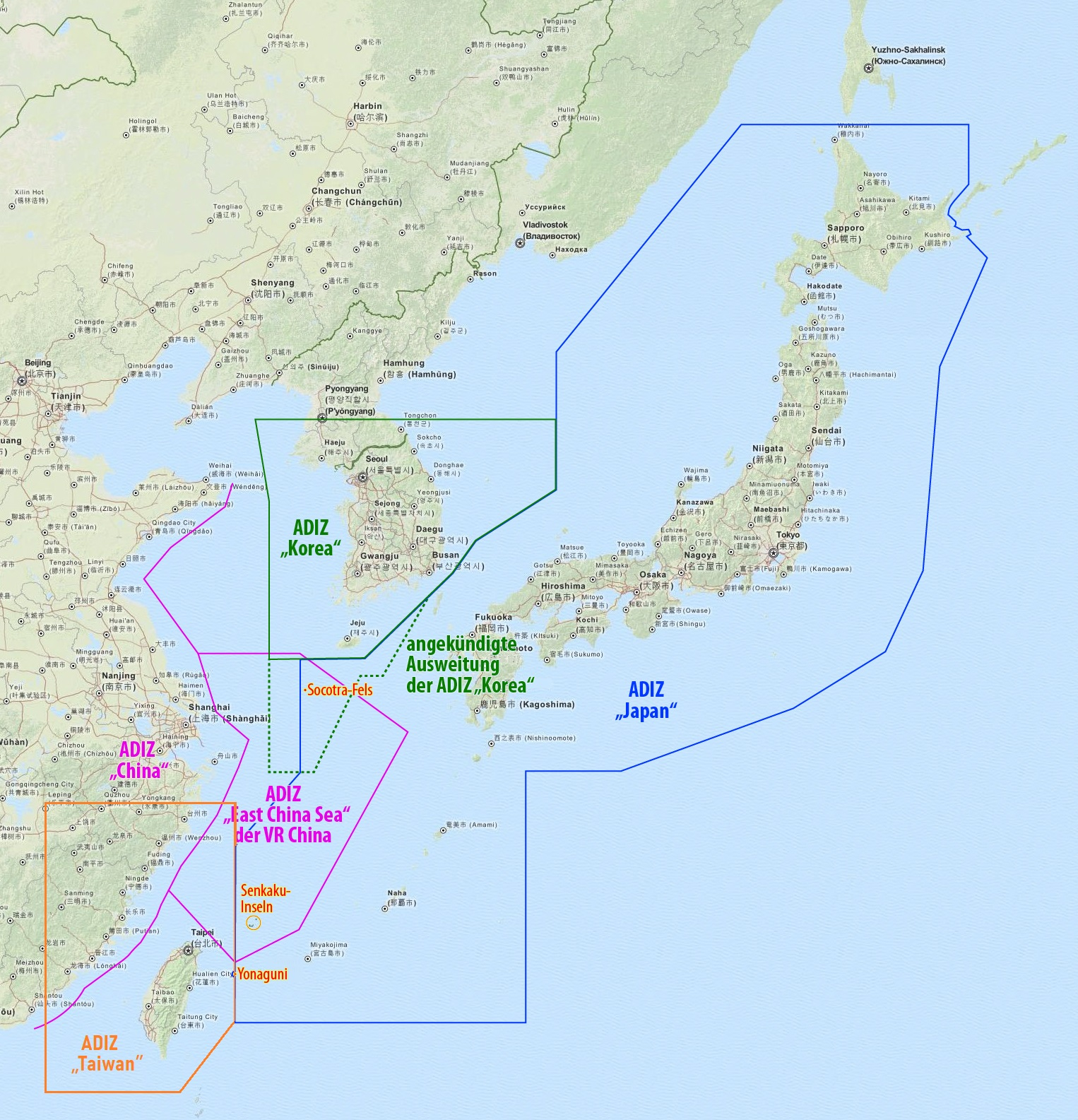
Air defense identification zones over Japan (blue), South Korea (green), China (pink), and Taiwan/ROC (Orange)

=== Japan ===
Japan has an ADIZ that covers most of its exclusive economic zone. It was created by the United States Armed Forces (USAF) after World War II, with the western border at 123° degrees east. That resulted in only the eastern half of Yonaguni Island being part of Japan's ADIZ and the western half being part of Taiwan's ADIZ.

On 25 June 2010, Japan extended its ADIZ around Yonaguni 22 km westwards to align with its territorial waters. That led to an overlap with Taiwan's. An anonymous official of Taiwan's Ministry of Foreign Affairs (MOFA) said that "ADIZ demarcation is at the discretion of each country, it was natural for Japan not to seek prior approval from Taiwan." MOFA minister at the time, Timothy Yang, also said "each country is entitled to draw its ADIZ" and that he believes "[Taiwan and Japan] understand each other's position." The ministry later issued a second statement expressing "extreme regret" over the rezoning and its opposition to the change. MOFA ministry spokesman at the time, Henry Chen, said that the government would not make "any concession on this issue as it is a matter of national sovereignty." and added "Taiwan and Japan would not engage in provocations as both sides had made their positions on the matter very clear."

=== Taiwan ===
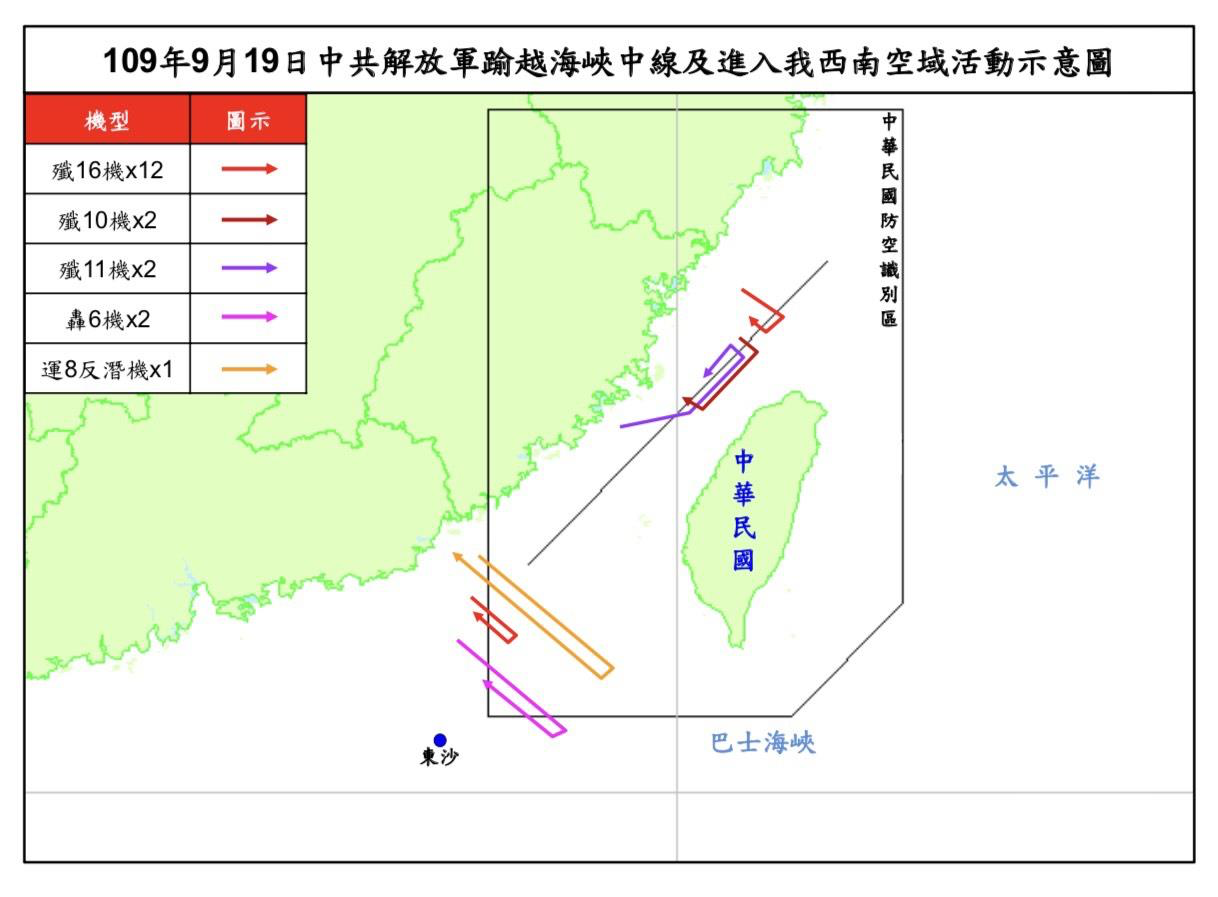
Typical ADIZ map from the Taiwan MND, showing a September 2020 incursion involving entry into the southwest ADIZ and crossing of the median line by the People's Liberation Army Air Force.

Taiwan has an ADIZ that covers most of the Taiwan Strait, parts of Fujian, Zhejiang, and Jiangxi, and part of the East China Sea. It was designed and created by the United States Armed Forces (USAF) after World War II and formed the basis of Taipei Flight Information Region. Around 9% of Taiwan's national defence budget in 2020 reportedly goes into the response to Chinese sorties, which usually involve flights inside the southwest part of the ADIZ, crossing of the median line, or circumnavigation. The ADIZ is monitored by PAVE PAWS radar located near Hsinchu and operated with help from US advisors. In 2022, several unidentified civilian drones approached Taiwan's outer islands and were warned off or shot down.

Maps of the Taiwan ADIZ from the Ministry of National Defense, R.O.C. usually include the theoretical median line for reference. Aircraft from Taiwan flew combat missions on the other side until they lost control of mainland airspace to the PLAAF after the Second Taiwan Strait Crisis. ROCAF U-2 planes continued to fly over the mainland until 1968. The line was avoided by the PRC until 1999 when groups of PLAAF aircraft crossed over in response to "state-to-state" comments made by Lee Teng-hui. The PRC has never recognized the line and has increased its frequency of incursions.

=== South Korea ===
South Korea operates a zone that covers most but not all of its claimed airspace. It does not cover some remote spots. The zone was established in 1951, during the Korean War, by the United States Air Force to block communist forces.

When part or all of flight route of an aircraft enters the KADIZ area, it is required to send a specific flight plan one hour prior to departure. Civilian aircraft with regular routes should submit a repetitive flight plan to the air traffic control. There is no need for legal action when an aircraft enters KADIZ as long as the aircraft follows its flight plan reported to the South Korean government. If there is a change in the flight passage or an approach without prior notification, the South Korean Air Force has the right to immediately identify or to track down the aircraft and to be prepared for interception. However, military force such as shooting down the plane cannot be exercised.

Following China's establishment of an ADIZ in November 2013 covering disputed areas, the Defense Ministry of Republic of Korea announced in December that year that the Korea Air Defense Identification Zone (KADIZ) would be expanded to partially overlap with those of China and Japan. The final zone would include the islands of Marado near Jeju, Hongdo in the Yellow Sea, and Ieodo within the overlapping exclusive economic zones of South Korea and China. The sensitive issues are expected to bring military or diplomatic conflict between the three countries. By 29 August, Chinese military jets had entered the KADIZ area without notice five times in 2018. Chinese foreign ministry spokeswoman Hua Chunying said that an ADIZ is not airspace, without referring to any specific incident.

=== China ===
On November 23, 2013 the People's Republic of China (PRC) established a zone in the East China Sea. The announcement drew criticism from some of China's East and Southeast neighbors and the United States. The responses focused on two aspects. Firstly, China's ADIZ in the East China Sea covers disputed territories such as the Japanese-controlled Senkaku Islands (Diaoyu Islands in the PRC) and the Socotra Rock, which is claimed by South Korea. Secondly, it overlaps with other countries' ADIZ and imposes requirements on both civilian and military aircraft, regardless of destination.

The media has reported that since 2010 China has been planning an ADIZ over the South China sea. However, as of 2020, China has not declared a South China Sea ADIZ.

== South Asia ==
=== India ===
India established ADIZs in the mid-twentieth century. Among other rules, notifications are required 10 minutes prior to entry. In case of delay, 45 or more minutes and a new Air Defence Clearance (ADC) numbers are required.

India has demarcated six ADIZ near its territory. The zones have been declared over the international border with Pakistan, the international border with Nepal, over the Line of Actual Control with China, along the eastern borders with Bangladesh, Bhutan and Myanmar and two in the southern region of India.

Military enforcement of ADIZs is solely the responsibility of the IAF, and the task is executed through a chain of radars as well as a C3I organisation. Aircraft and surface-to-air missiles of the IAF, with elements of the Army and the Navy participating in their specific areas, where required, carry out interceptions. Civil aviation authorities, in conjunction with the IAF, also assist in this process by ensuring regulatory and control measures, such as assignment of Air Defence Clearance (ADC) numbers to aircraft entering or operating in Indian air space and by confirming the ADC of the incoming traffic, where necessary.

=== Bangladesh ===
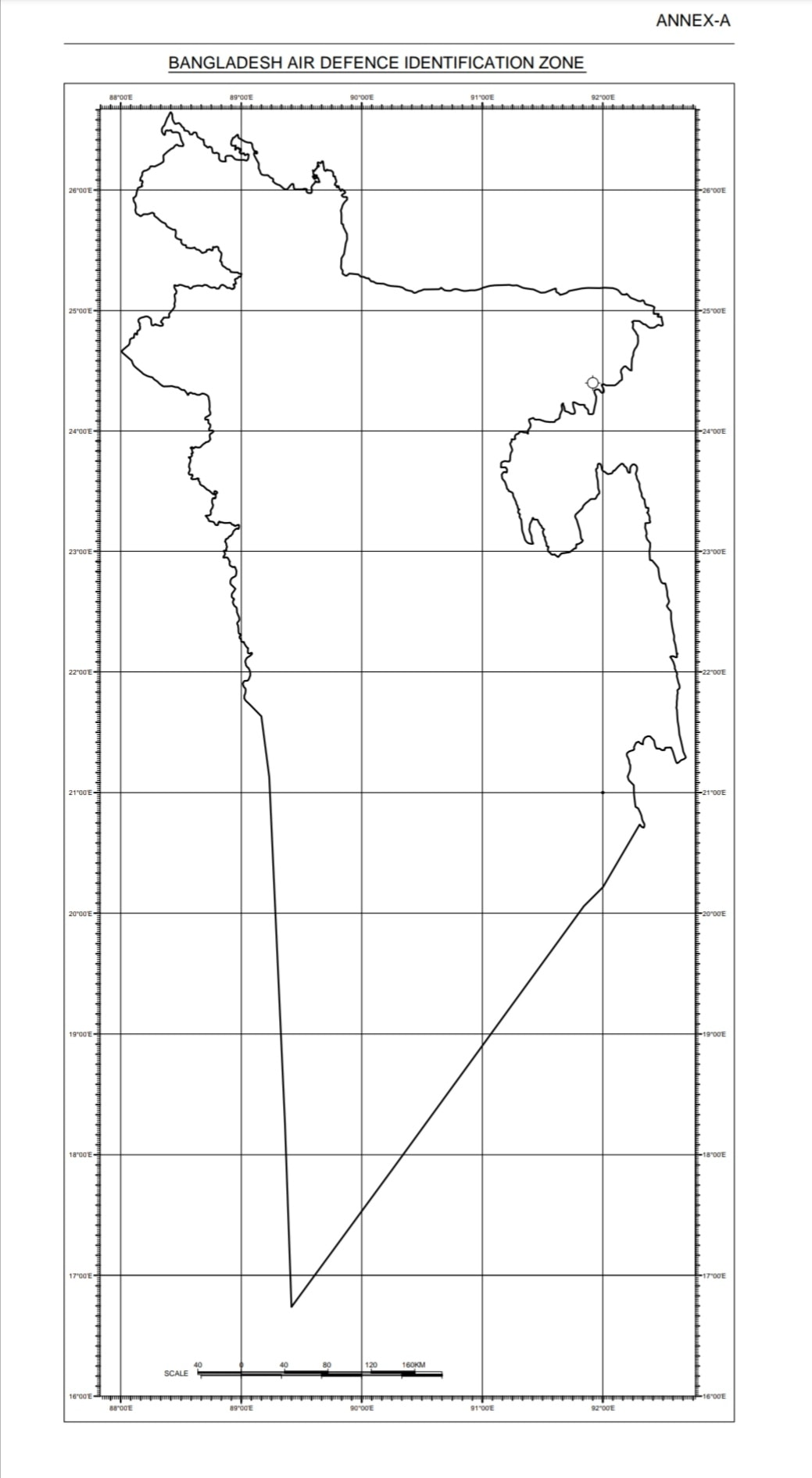
Bangladesh Air Defense Identification Zone

Bangladesh maintains an ADIZ that extends over the adjoining sea to the south as delineated by the following coordinates:

1. 21°07′44.80″N 89°13′56.50″E
2. 18°15′54.12″N 89°21′47.56″E
3. 16°43′28.74″N 89°25′54.37″E
4. 20°13′06.30″N 92°00′07.60″E
5. 20°03′32.00″N 91°50′31.80″E
6. 17°52′34.06″N 90°15′04.66″E

All flights of aircraft, civil/military, Bangladeshi or foreign, originating within the ADIZ and those penetrating the Bangladesh ADIZ must obtain prior permission and Air Defense Clearance (ADC).

Among other procedures, aircraft flying without a valid ADC number or failing to comply with any restriction or deviating from flight plan will be liable to interception by Bangladesh Air Force.

== Comparison ==
ADIZ	Requires flight plan or identification from civilian aircraft?	Requires flight plan or identification from military aircraft?	Requires flight plan from state aircraft that does not enter sovereign airspace?	Covers territory administered by another country?
China (PRC)	Yes	Yes	Yes	Yes
Japan	No	No	No	No
South Korea	Yes	Yes	Yes	Yes
Taiwan (ROC)	Yes	Unclear	Unclear	Yes
United States	Yes	No	No	No

== See also ==
- Index of aviation articles
