= AirSea Battle =

Multi-domain battle doctrine

AirSea Battle is an integrated battle doctrine that forms a key component of the military strategy of the United States. The doctrine became official in February 2010, and was renamed to Joint Concept for Access and Maneuver in the Global Commons (JAM-GC) in 2015.

== Background ==
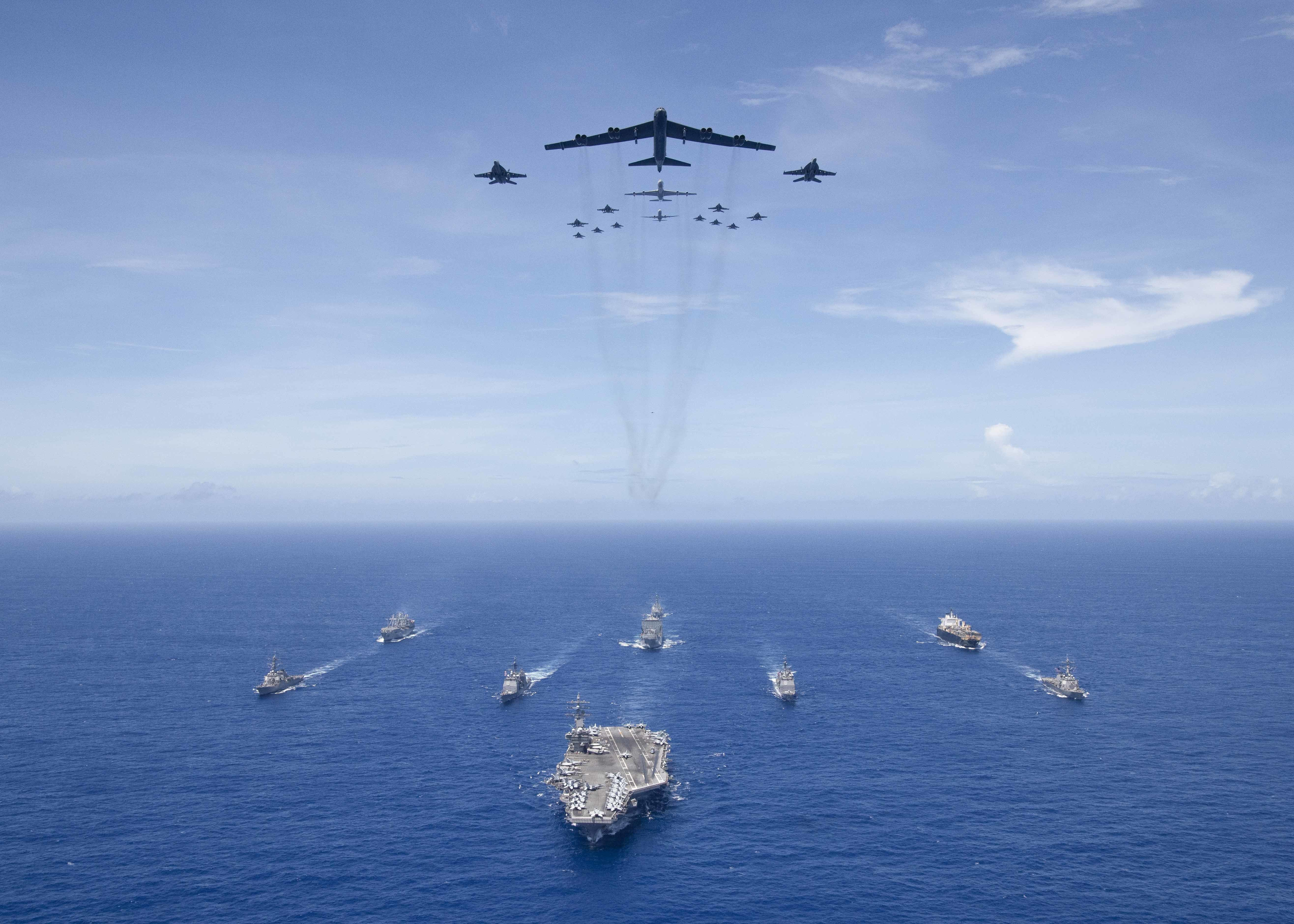
A United States Air Force Bomber Aircraft B-52 Stratofortress flying over United States Navy Aircraft Carrier USS Ronald Reagan during The Valiant Shield Exercise.

Inspired by the AirLand Battle concept, the United States Navy and Air Force are working on a new AirSea Battle doctrine. A version was codified in a 2009 Navy-Air Force classified memo which addressed "asymmetrical threats" in the Western Pacific and the Persian Gulf, which are seen as meaning China and Iran. The Pentagon has created a China Integration Team composed of U.S. Navy officers to apply AirSea Battle lessons to a potential conflict with China, particular in and around the first island chain. In 2010 the Obama Administration declared that freedom of maritime navigation in the South China Sea, whose islands are claimed variously by China, Vietnam, Brunei, Taiwan, Malaysia, and the Philippines, is a U.S. national interest. The comment was seen as a response to a Chinese official stating the region was a "core interest" of Chinese sovereignty.

AirSea Battle officially became part of U.S. grand strategy, when, in February 2010, the U.S. Department of Defense's Quadrennial Defense Review stated: "The Air Force and Navy together are developing a new joint air-sea battle concept for defeating adversaries across the range of military operations, including adversaries equipped with sophisticated anti-access and area denial capabilities. The concept will address how air and naval forces will integrate capabilities across all operational domains—air, sea, land, space, and cyberspace—to counter growing challenges to U.S. freedom of action. As it matures, the concept will also help guide the development of future capabilities needed for effective power projection operations."

The conceptual background of AirSea Battle also stems from the "Revolution in Military Affairs" theory. Proponents of the theory have sought to direct American battle planning with new technological abilities in mind, such as precision-guided munitions and improvements in communication and ISTAR.

== History ==
The Pentagon's Office of Net Assessment, led by Andrew Marshall, has played a leading role in designing U.S. strategy in the Pacific. Marshall's office works closely with the Center for Strategic and Budgetary Assessments (CSBA) led by Lieutenant-Colonel Andrew Krepinevich, whose outfit helped coin the phrase AirSea Battle.

CSBA is a think tank engaging in AirSea Battle research and the leading advocate of the AirSea Battle concept. In April 2010 the CSBA released the report, "AirSea Battle: A Point-of-Departure Operational Concept," outlining the U.S. military's growing operational difficulties in the Western Pacific Theater of Operations (WPTO). The report argues for the United States to diversify its military strategy away from "the demands of modern irregular warfare" and fielding forces designed for "security threats that are fading into history" to one that highlights the Chinese People's Liberation Army's (PLA) quick ability to field anti-access/area denial (A2/AD) technologies. The authors are quick to point out that they are not suggesting the United States seeks a confrontation or a war with China, but rather "offsetting the PLA's unprovoked and unwarranted military buildup."

Michael E. O'Hanlon of the Brookings Institution believes the phrase "AirSea Battle" is politically contentious and should be renamed to "AirSea Operations," which he thinks better reflects the doctrine. "It may seem curious to worry about semantics and political correctness when talking about military systems or plans for war. But in Asia, semantics count a great deal; on a recent trip there, I heard lots of complaints about America's perceived efforts to contain China with frequent reference to…AirSea Battle doctrine." O'Hanlon is a strong supporter of the doctrine but thinks a change in semantics, along with more dialogue and transparency will mitigate the security dilemma between the United States and China. O'Hanlon and James Steinberg argue that "policymakers must put this military doctrine into perspective and not let it become a prescription for unfettered rivalry."

The 2014 Exercise Valiant Shield tested Air-Sea concepts.

== Coordination ==
The Pentagon's new Air-Sea Strategy Office will focus on anti-anti-access/area denial concepts. The House Armed Service Committee has questioned if this office was duplicate of other Pentagon bureaucracy.

Kenneth McKenzie defines the United States Marine Corps role in AirSea Battle as an airborne assault force that operates from ships to seize bases.

The United States Air Force is responding to the threats against their foreign bases with the Pacific Airpower Resiliency Initiative. In 2014 Seventh Air Force commander Lt Gen Jan-Marc Jouas stated that AirSea Battle would be the new warfighting doctrine for Korea.

== See also ==
American geostrategy

- America's Pivot to Asia Strategy
- Blue Team (U.S. politics)
- China containment policy
- Foreign policy of the Barack Obama administration
- Geostrategy in Central Asia
- Second Cold War

Chinese geostrategy

- Belt and Road Initiative
- Chinese century
- China Lobby
- List of disputed territories of China
- String of Pearls (Indian Ocean)

Bi and multilateral relations

- Quadrilateral Security Dialogue
- Malabar (naval exercise)
- China-United States relations
- India-United States relations
- Japan-United States relations
- Philippines–United States relations
- Indo-Pacific
