= Center for Strategic and Budgetary Assessments =

American-based think tank

- Official logo
- Abbreviation: CSBA
- Founder: Gordon Adams
- Founded at: Washington, D.C., U.S.
- Type: Defense think tank
- Tax ID no.: 52-1930922
- Legal status: 501(c)(3) nonprofit organization
- Headquarters: 1667 K Street NW
- Location(s): Farragut Square, Washington, D.C.
- Coordinates: 38°54′10.881″N 77°02′17.282″W
- Origins: Defense Budget Project of the Center on Budget and Policy Priorities
- President: Thomas Mahnken
- Revenue: US$6,022,026 (2019)
- Expenses: US$7,539,309 (2019)
- Website: csbaonline.org

The Center for Strategic and Budgetary Assessments (CSBA) is an independent, non-profit, Washington, D.C.–based think tank specializing in US defense policy, force planning, and budgets. It is headed by Thomas Mahnken. CSBA's stated mission is "to develop innovative, resource-informed defense concepts, promote public debate, and spur action to advance U.S. and allied interests."

CSBA emphasizes initiatives the United States and its allies can take to wisely invest in the future, including during periods of fiscal austerity and uncertainty. CSBA evaluates its policy proposals through the net assessment methodology, wargaming, and by estimated impact on the Department of Defense budget over multiple Future Years Defense Programs.

== Background ==
CSBA traces its origins to the Defense Budget Project, which was established by Gordon Adams in 1983 at the Center on Budget and Policy Priorities in order to "fill a vital information gap in the policy debate" during the Reagan Administration's defense buildup." In May 1995, the Center for Strategic and Budgetary Assessments was incorporated in its current form. Over the next two decades, CSBA played a prominent role in the debate over the revolution in military affairs (RMA) and the transformation of the US military.

Since September 11, 2001, CSBA has focused its analysis on linking near-term requirements to longer term challenges. According to the group's website, CSBA "looks out two to three decades to identify emerging security challenges and opportunities." CSBA describes its current efforts as "drawing attention to a set of worrisome and profound emerging areas of concern: a rising China threat in the Pacific Theater; a nuclear-armed Iran; maintaining the US defense industrial base; and realigning the defense budget." Over the past few years, CSBA has played a prominent role in the ongoing development of an AirSea Battle concept by the U.S. Air Force and Navy. Following cuts to U.S. defense spending and accelerating foreign military modernization, CSBA has also taken a lead role in highlighting the need to rebalance the Department of Defense's force structure and invest wisely for future challenges.

CSBA is a 501(c)(3) non-profit educational organization. The group's public education and research program is funded by grants and contributions from a range of foundations and corporations. The majority of CSBA's income comes from research support under contract with the Department of Defense, its sub-agencies, the six branches, and the Defense Advanced Research Projects Agency (DARPA).

== Staff ==
Notable key personnel employed by CSBA have included:

- Thomas G. Mahnken, President from 2016
- Andrew Krepinevich, President from 1993 to 2016
- Eric S. Edelman, Distinguished Fellow, former Undersecretary of Defense for Policy (2005–2009), Ambassador to Turkey (2003–2005), Ambassador to Finland (1998–2001)

== Notable alumni ==
- Robert O. Work, former Vice President for Strategic Studies, served as Deputy Secretary of Defense from May 2014 to July 2017.
- Michael G. Vickers, former Vice President for Strategic Studies, served as Undersecretary of Defense for Intelligence and Assistant Secretary of Defense for Special Operations and Low-Intensity Conflict.

== Board of directors ==
Notable board members include:

- Barbara Humpton, Chair
- Jack Keane
- Paul J. Selva

Past notable board members have included:

- Nelson M. Ford
- Dave McCurdy
