= Submarine detection system =

System for detecting submarines

Submarine detection systems are an aspect of antisubmarine warfare. They are of particular importance in nuclear deterrence, as they directly undermine one of the three arms of the nuclear triad by making counter-force attacks on submarines possible.

== Types of system ==
They break down into two broad categories; acoustic and non-acoustic.

Acoustic systems in turn break down into active sonar systems and passive sonar systems designed to detect the acoustic signature of submarines such as SOSUS.

Non-acoustic systems can work on a variety of different physical principles, including the use of magnetic anomaly detectors and systems such as SOKS, which are believed to work by detecting phenomena such as trace chemicals, heat changes, and radioactivity left in a submarine's wake. There is evidence that some Royal Navy submarines are fitted with wake-detection systems.
