= Anti-access/area denial =

Military strategy

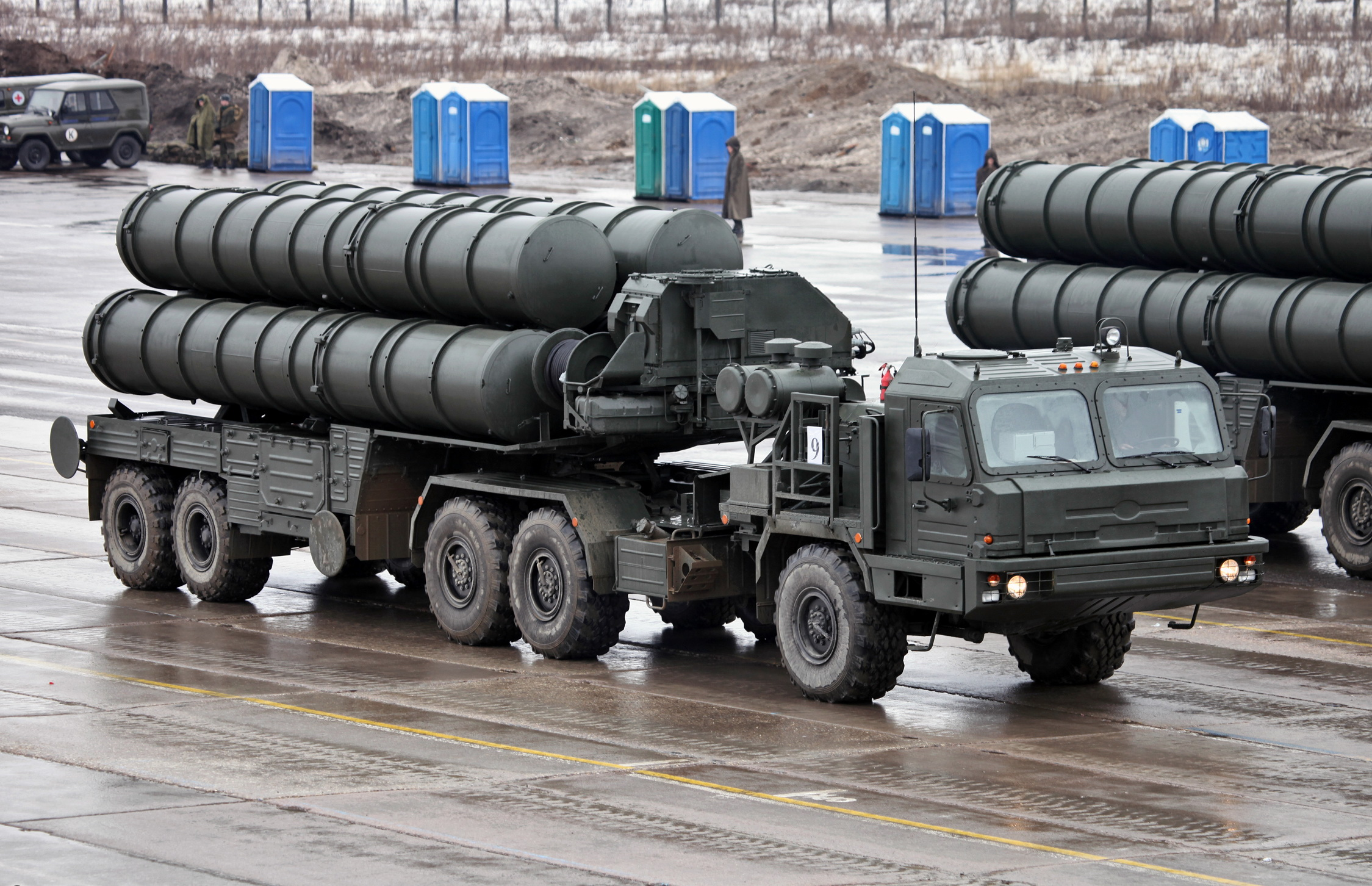
An S-400 surface-to-air missile system can be used as an A2/AD asset.

Anti-access/area denial (or A2/AD) is a military strategy to control access to and within an operating environment. In an early definition, anti-access refers to those actions and capabilities, usually long-range, designed to prevent an opposing force from entering an operational area. Area denial refers to those actions and capabilities, usually of shorter range, designed to limit an opposing force's freedom of action within the operational area. In short, A2 affects movement to a theater, while AD affects movement within a theater. A2/AD typically refers to a strategy used by a weaker opponent to defend against an opponent of superior skill, although a stronger opponent can also use A2/AD.

== Overview ==
=== United States ===
A2/AD strategy is a significant concern of US policy, viewing it as a weapon of weaker forces that could be used against the US military. The US military considers that enemy adoption of anti-access/area denial strategies "may well be the most difficult operational challenge U.S. forces will face over the coming decades."The Department of Defense developed the "joint air-sea battle concept for defeating adversaries across the range of military operations, including adversaries equipped with sophisticated anti-access and area denial capabilities".

Chief of Naval Operations Adm. John Richardson has commented on the vagueness of the term A2/AD, saying: "To some, A2AD is a code-word, suggesting an impenetrable “keep-out zone” that forces can enter only at extreme peril to themselves. To others, A2AD refers to a family of technologies. To still others, a strategy. In sum, A2AD is a term bandied about freely, with no precise definition, that sends a variety of vague or conflicting signals, depending on the context in which it is either transmitted or received. [...] The Navy will avoid using the term A2AD as a stand-alone acronym that can mean many things to different people or almost anything to anyone."

=== China ===
The People's Republic of China is employing a multi-faceted A2/AD strategy to exclude or deter as many adversary forces from acting within the waters it claims as its territorial waters as outlined by the nine-dash line. The initial impulse for this strategy is said to have been the deployment of two US carrier battle groups in the area, reacting to Chinese tests and exercises for a possible invasion of Taiwan in 1995, which went effectively uncontested by the Chinese navy. The Chinese A2/AD strategy's main focus lies on sea denial by missiles (see also paragraph Sea), but features submarines and airplanes as well. The Chinese denial capabilities are not sufficient to exclude Japanese and US troops from the South China Sea, but enough to inflict heavy casualties in case of a war for the occupation of Taiwan.

== Sea ==
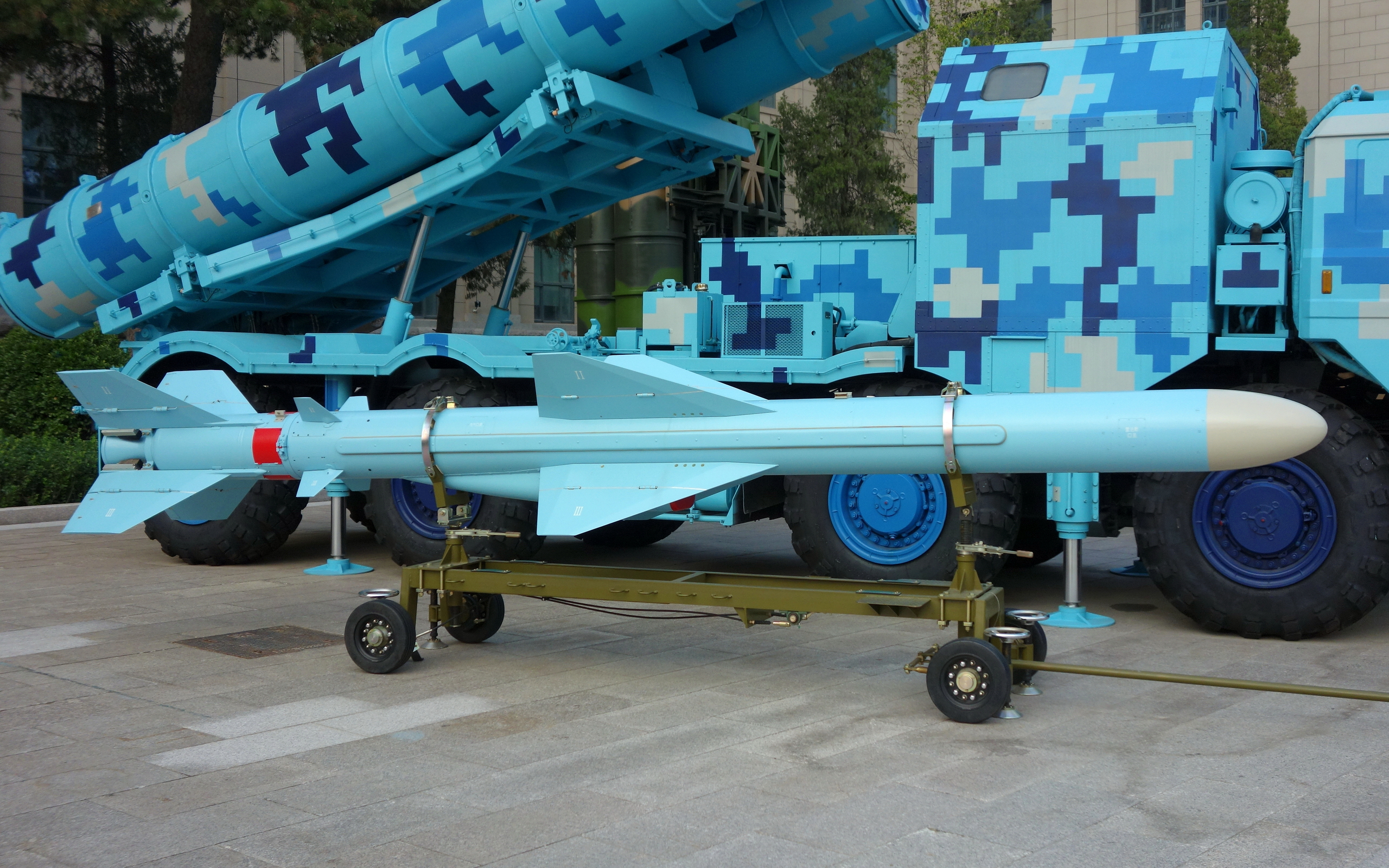
The KD-88 anti-ship missile is part of China's A2/AD weaponry.

The concept of A2/AD has long been used by navies under names such as Command of the seas and controlling the sea lines of communication. Naval A2/AD typically takes advantage of geographical features that limit access such as chokepoints or the water surrounding an island. A blockade is an example of a naval anti-access operation.

Anti-ship missiles are a modern method of stopping a potential adversary from attacking by sea. China, Russia, North Korea, Syria and Iran all have developed or imported such weapons in an effort to develop a modern A2/AD strategy to counter United States' power projection from nearby waterways. In response to China's pursuit of such A2/AD capabilities, the United States has developed the AirSea Battle doctrine. Other methods of area denial at a strategic level include aircraft carriers, submarines, surface-to-air missiles, ballistic missiles, cruise missiles, electronic warfare and interceptor aircraft. Mines, coastal submarines, and attack craft could be employed in littoral areas. Other area denial systems include cruise missiles, long-range strike aircraft, mines, and coastal defense artillery. The term A2/AD was created in 2003 to describe the threats posed by long-range missile systems, precision munitions, and satellite technology that will make military operations in the littoral areas challenging for modern naval forces.

== Land ==
The anti-access threat for the Army includes "theater ballistic missiles, cruise missiles, long-range rockets and artillery, weapons of mass destruction and other unconventional means, and information operations." A2/AD strategies on land often take advantage of natural geographic features or bridges that can support anti-access operations. Land-based area denial operations degrade the adversary's ability with techniques such as harassing fires, deception, and guerrilla-warfare-like tactics that avoid direct confrontation. Land-based area denial techniques also include artillery, rocket, and missile strikes, mine fields, and chemical, biological, radiological, and nuclear agents.

== Air ==
A no-fly zone is an A2/AD strategy in the air, prohibiting access to part of the airspace. A2/AD can be supported by surface-to-air missiles such as the S-300 and S-400. The threat on forward air bases from cruise and ballistic missiles can also impose anti-access.

== Cyberspace ==
Attacks in cyberspace are an increasingly important part of the A2/AD threat. Tactical cyber A2/AD operations block access to specific resources, while strategic A2/AD blocks access to cyberspace itself.

== See also ==
- Area denial weapon
