= Andrew Krepinevich =

American defense policy analyst

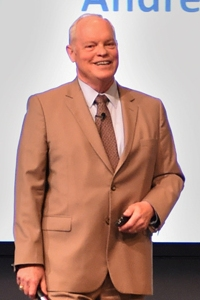

Personal details
- Born: 13 February 1950 (age 76) New York, U.S.
- Education: United States Military Academy (BS); Harvard University (MPA, PhD)

Military service
- Allegiance: United States
- Branch/service: United States Army
- Years of service: 1972–1993
- Rank: Lieutenant Colonel

Andrew Francis Krepinevich Jr. (born 13 February 1950) is a defense policy analyst who is a distinguished senior fellow at (and former longtime president of) the Center for Strategic and Budgetary Assessments.

== Army service ==
Born in New York State, Krepinevich graduated from West Point with a B.S. degree in 1972. He then spent 21 years as an officer in the U.S. Army, serving on the personal staff of three Defense Secretaries and in the Office of Net Assessment, retiring in the rank of lieutenant colonel. While in the army, Krepinevich received an M.P.A. from the Harvard Kennedy School in 1980 and then earned a Ph.D. at Harvard University in 1984 while teaching social sciences at the U.S. Military Academy. His doctoral thesis was entitled The Army concept and Vietnam: a case study in organizational failure. He then published it as The Army and Vietnam in 1986, in which he argued that the United States could have won the Vietnam War had the Army adopted a small-unit pacification strategy in South Vietnam's villages, rather than conducting search and destroy operations in remote jungles.

Fred Kaplan, writing nearly thirty years later, described the reaction to the publication of The Army and Vietnam, from interviews conducted for his book The Insurgents. Retired General Bruce Palmer Jr. wrote a "scathing review" in Parameters describing Krepinevich as having "crippling naivete," saying he lacked "historical breadth and objectivity" and saying the book had an "abrasive" tone. Kaplan wrote that "..Palmer's review was widely - and correctly - interpreted as a death-sentence for the upstart's career." Krepinevich went on to staff positions in the Pentagon. But "..the notion that he might ever command a combat unit again was out of the question"; "he was barred even from speaking again at West Point."

While working for the Office of Net Assessment in 1992, Krepinevich authored "The Military-Technical Revolution: A Preliminary Assessment," an influential document in the development of thinking about the "Revolution in Military Affairs."

== Civilian career ==
Following his retirement from the army, Krepinevich became president of the Center for Strategic and Budgetary Assessments, a non-profit think tank focused on defense and national security issues. While at CSBA he has served on the National Defense Panel and Defense Policy Board, and advised senior military and civilian policymakers. In 2005, he published an influential Foreign Affairs article on "How to Win in Iraq". Informed by Krepinevich's previous research on Vietnam, the article called for the adoption of a population-centric counterinsurgency strategy much like the approach implemented during the "Surge" of U.S. forces two years later. In 2009 he published 7 Deadly Scenarios: A Military Futurist Explores War in the 21st Century, which presents seven hypothetical scenarios that would severely challenge the U.S. military. His recent work has frequently addressed the challenges posed by the modernization of China's military forces, Iran's pursuit of nuclear weapons, and the proliferation of precision-guided munitions.

Krepinevich has also served as an adjunct professor at George Mason University, the School of Advanced International Studies at Johns Hopkins University and Georgetown University.

Most recently, Krepinevich co-authored, with his CSBA colleague Barry Watts, The Last Warrior: Andrew Marshall and the Shaping of Modern American Defense Strategy (Basic Books, January 2015). Both authors had previously worked for Andrew Marshall at the Office of Net Assessment.

Krepinevich's pending departure from CSBA was announced following a July 2015 meeting by the think tank's board of directors. In March 2016, he became a senior distinguished fellow at CSBA.

In 2023, Krepinevich published The Origins of Victory: How Disruptive Military Innovation Determines the Fates of Great Powers, in which he describes the ongoing military revolution unfolding around the reconnaissance-strike complex and precision warfare paradigm. He then uses four case studies of disruptive military innovation - the fundamental reform of the Royal Navy by Jackie Fisher, the re-emergence of maneuver warfare via Blitzkrieg tactics, the displacement of the line of battle and its focus on battleships by aircraft carrier operations pioneered by the U.S. Navy, and the transition from mass tactical bombing to precision bombing developed within the United States Air Force - to illustrate its impact on military history and how it may be sustained in the early 21st century.
