= Malacca dilemma =

China's strategic concern about the Strait of Malacca

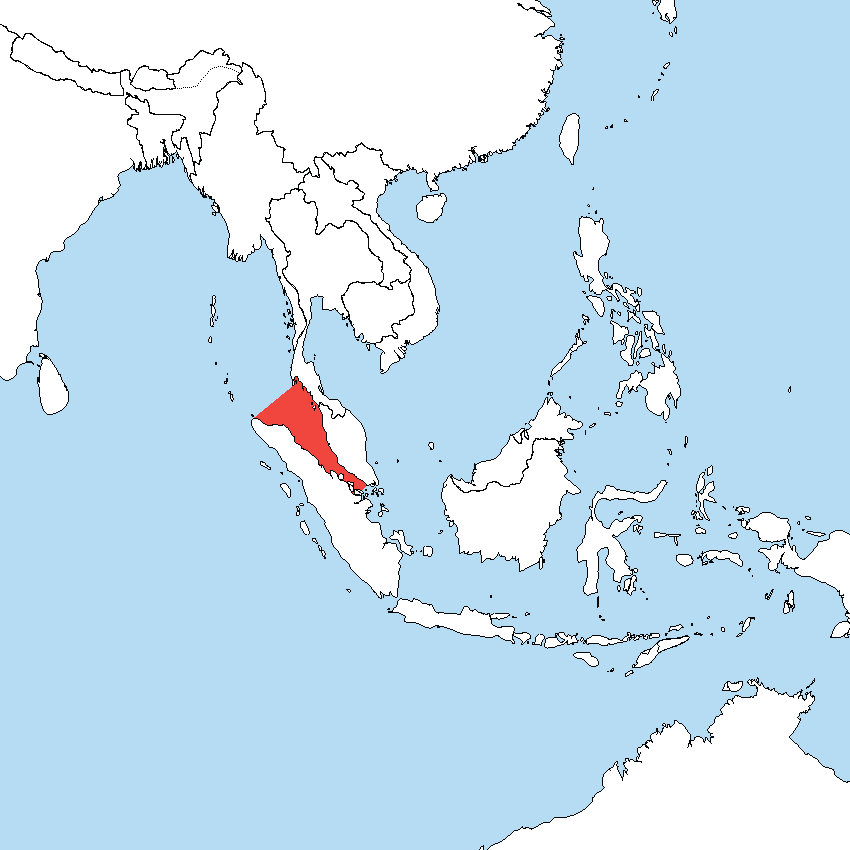
The waters of the Strait of Malacca are highlighted in red

The Malacca dilemma is a strategic vulnerability for the People's Republic of China due to its heavy reliance on the strait of Malacca, a critical maritime choke point connecting the Indian Ocean and the South China Sea. This narrow strait accommodates over 60,000 vessels annually, representing roughly 25% of global maritime trade, including approximately 80% of China's imported crude oil. The term was coined by General Secretary of the Chinese Communist Party Hu Jintao in 2003 to describe China's growing economic and security concerns stemming from potential disruptions caused by piracy, maritime terrorism, and geopolitical conflicts involving other major powers, especially the United States.

In response, China has implemented a strategy to alleviate this vulnerability, focusing on diversifying energy import routes through pipelines from Central Asia, Russia, Pakistan, and Myanmar through the Belt and Road Initiative. Additionally, China is developing strategic port facilities, known as the "String of Pearls," in the Indian Ocean, while enhancing its naval capabilities to secure maritime trade routes.

Regional and international responses to China's efforts have been mixed. India has expanded its naval presence and strengthened ties with regional states in response to concerns over strategic encirclement. China has sought to build economic and security ties with Southeast Asian countries, despite ongoing territorial disputes. The United States, seen in Chinese strategic assessments as a potential threat to energy security, has maintained a strong naval presence and developed strategies to potentially restrict China's access to key shipping lanes.

== Background ==
The strait of Malacca, located with Sumatra Island in Indonesia to the west and Peninsular Malaysia to the east, is one of the most strategically important maritime chokepoints globally. Linking the Indian Ocean with the South China Sea, the strait accommodates more than 60,000 vessels annually, representing approximately 25% of global maritime trade including 80% of the oil imported to Northeast Asia.

China's rapid economic growth, following the initiation of the Open Door Policy and the reform and opening up under Deng Xiaoping in the late 1970s and 1980s, has drastically increased its demand for imported energy resources, particularly crude oil and natural gas. By 1993, China transitioned from a net oil exporter to a net oil importer. Its domestic oil production, unable to keep pace with accelerating demand, led to a heavy reliance on foreign oil supplies, primarily from the Middle East and Africa. By 2009, more than half of China's oil consumption was imported, with projections indicating further increases in foreign dependency, reaching potentially over 80% by 2035.

The dependency on maritime routes for energy imports, with roughly 80% of China's imported crude oil passing through the Strait of Malacca, significantly elevates the strategic importance of this maritime passageway to China's national security and economic stability. The Chinese government has grown increasingly concerned about its limited influence over the strait and the potential risks posed by piracy, maritime terrorism, and geopolitical conflicts, particularly those involving the United States, which maintains a significant naval presence in the Asia-Pacific region.

Alternative shipping routes are inferior for a variety of reasons. The Sunda Strait has strong tidal currents complexifying nagivation and is shallower, having a minimum depth of just 20 metres (66 ft). Routes that pass through the Makassar Strait and Lombok Strait are substantially longer and therefore more expensive. The Northern Sea Route lacks infrastructure and is closed seasonally.

The term "Malacca dilemma" was coined in 2003 by Chinese leader Hu Jintao, describing the strategic challenge China faces in securing access to critical energy and trade routes. This dilemma has since shaped China's foreign policy, energy strategy, and maritime security posture, prompting efforts to diversify energy sources, develop alternative transportation routes, and strengthen diplomatic and military capabilities to mitigate potential disruptions to its economic lifelines.

== China's response ==
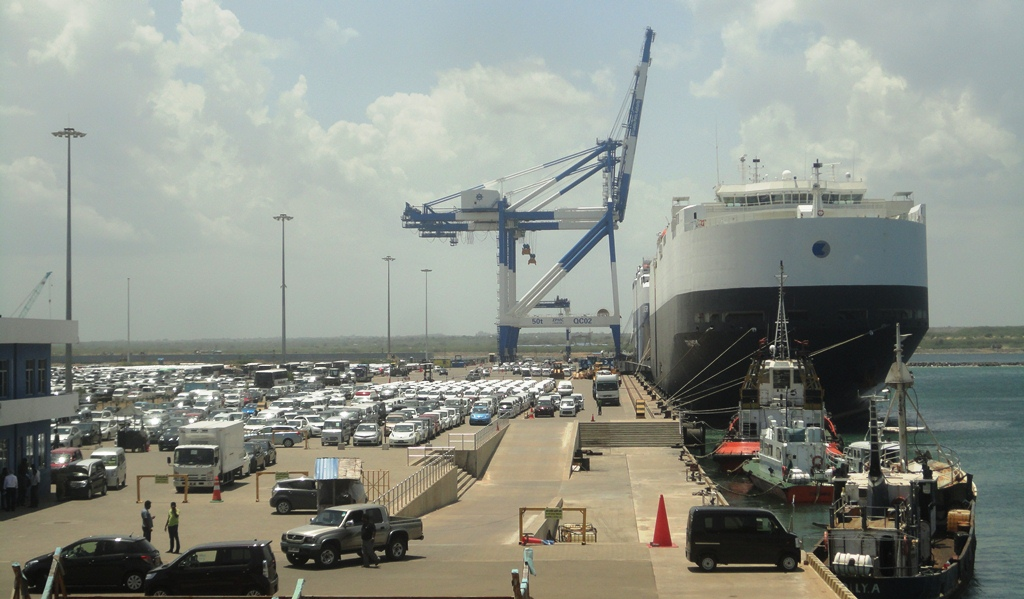
A ship docked at Hambantota port

To address the Malacca dilemma, the Chinese government has aimed at reducing dependency on the strait by diversifying energy supply sources and transportation routes. China has invested in alternative routes such as pipelines from Central Asia, Russia, and Myanmar, which allow the transportation of oil and gas directly into Chinese territory, thereby bypassing the vulnerable maritime route of Malacca.

The China-Myanmar pipelines, the first of which has been operational since 2013, run from Myanmar to Yunnan province in southwestern China. The oil pipeline provides a pathway for maritime shipping to deliver oil without passing through the Malacca strait, while the gas pipeline directly transports gas from Myanmar. A Kazakhstan–China oil pipeline has provided a land-based source of oil, and has been operational since May 2006. Several oil pipelines are planned between Russia and China.

Additionally, the China-Pakistan Economic Corridor (CPEC) forms an integral part of China's Belt and Road Initiative, offering a direct overland connection from Gwadar Port in Pakistan to China's Xinjiang region. CPEC reduces maritime shipping distance and time, providing China with a secure alternative to maritime chokepoints such as Malacca.

To secure maritime trade routes and increase regional influence, China has pursued the development of strategic port facilities along the Indian Ocean, often referred to as the "String of Pearls," such as Gwadar Port, Hambantota Port (Sri Lanka), and Kyaukphyu Port (Myanmar). China has also accelerated naval modernization and expanded its maritime presence to ensure trade route security. These enhanced naval capabilities have allowed China to conduct more extensive maritime patrols and respond to potential threats on the Strait of Malacca.

China's arctic policy, termed the "Polar Silk Road," is understood to encompass geopolitical objectives such as providing options to bypass the Strait of Malacca and the Strait of Hormuz.

== Regional and international response ==
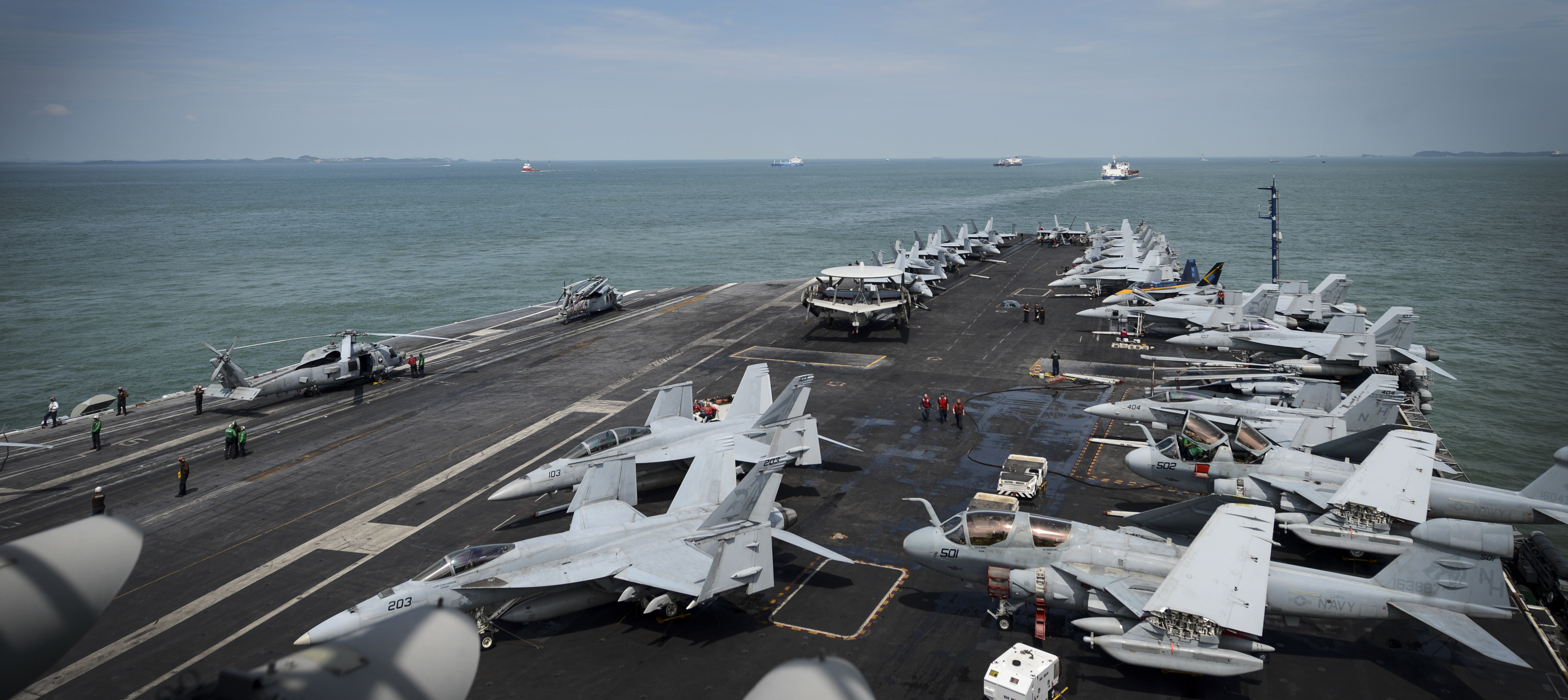
USS Nimitz transits the Strait of Malacca

India has responded to China's growing presence in the Indian Ocean by expanding its own naval footprint and strengthening diplomatic and military ties with regional states. For example, India has increased engagement with countries in the African Rim and worked to limit Chinese port development in Sri Lanka. These actions reflect India's concerns about the security of maritime trade routes and the potential for strategic encirclement by Chinese naval and commercial infrastructure.

Despite territorial disputes in the South China Sea with some ASEAN members, China has engaged in a "charm offensive" to develop closer ties with Southeast Asian countries. Positioning China as a reliable partner in international frameworks was seen as the best method of securing China's interests in the Strait of Malacca. Growing economic ties since the 1990s have included individual investments in different ASEAN countries as well as the creation of the ASEAN–China Free Trade Area, while security agreements included a 2006 anti-piracy cooperation agreement.

The United States is viewed within Chinese strategic analysis as a potential threat to maritime energy flows through the Strait of Malacca. In the event of a conflict, particularly over Taiwan, the United States could interdict oil shipments to China by disrupting maritime routes. China has expressed concern that U.S. naval forces operating near the Strait of Malacca could obstruct critical petroleum shipments, effectively cutting off vital imports. U.S. maritime strategy has included options for restricting China's access to key sea lanes through the use of attack submarines and surface ships.

== See also ==
- Blockade
- Island chain strategy
- Rimland
- Strategic petroleum reserve (China)
