= Double fish hook strategy =

Indian geo-political strategy

'Double fish hook' strategy is a speculated maritime strategy which India adopts to counter the String of Pearls strategy by the People's Republic of China. This 'fish hook' strategy of India is expected to complement the 'fish hook' strategy undertaken by the US along with its allies in the Pacific Ocean.

The 'double fish hook' involves a string of port developments and alliances that India has entered into. The eastern 'fish hook' covers the eastern Indian Ocean and begins in the Andaman and Nicobar Islands and ends at the US military base (Diego Garcia) in the Chagos Archipelago. The Andaman and Nicobar Islands constitute the endpoint of the US 'fish hook' strategy. The western 'fish hook' begins at the Duqm port through India's Maritime Transport Agreement with Oman and traverses Mauritius, Seychelles, and Madagascar. India also develops maritime linkages with France, which has security interests for its territories in the Indian Ocean region.

== See also ==
- Island chain strategy
- Necklace of Diamonds
