= String of Pearls (Indian Ocean) =

Chinese naval strategy hypothesised by the U.S. in 2004

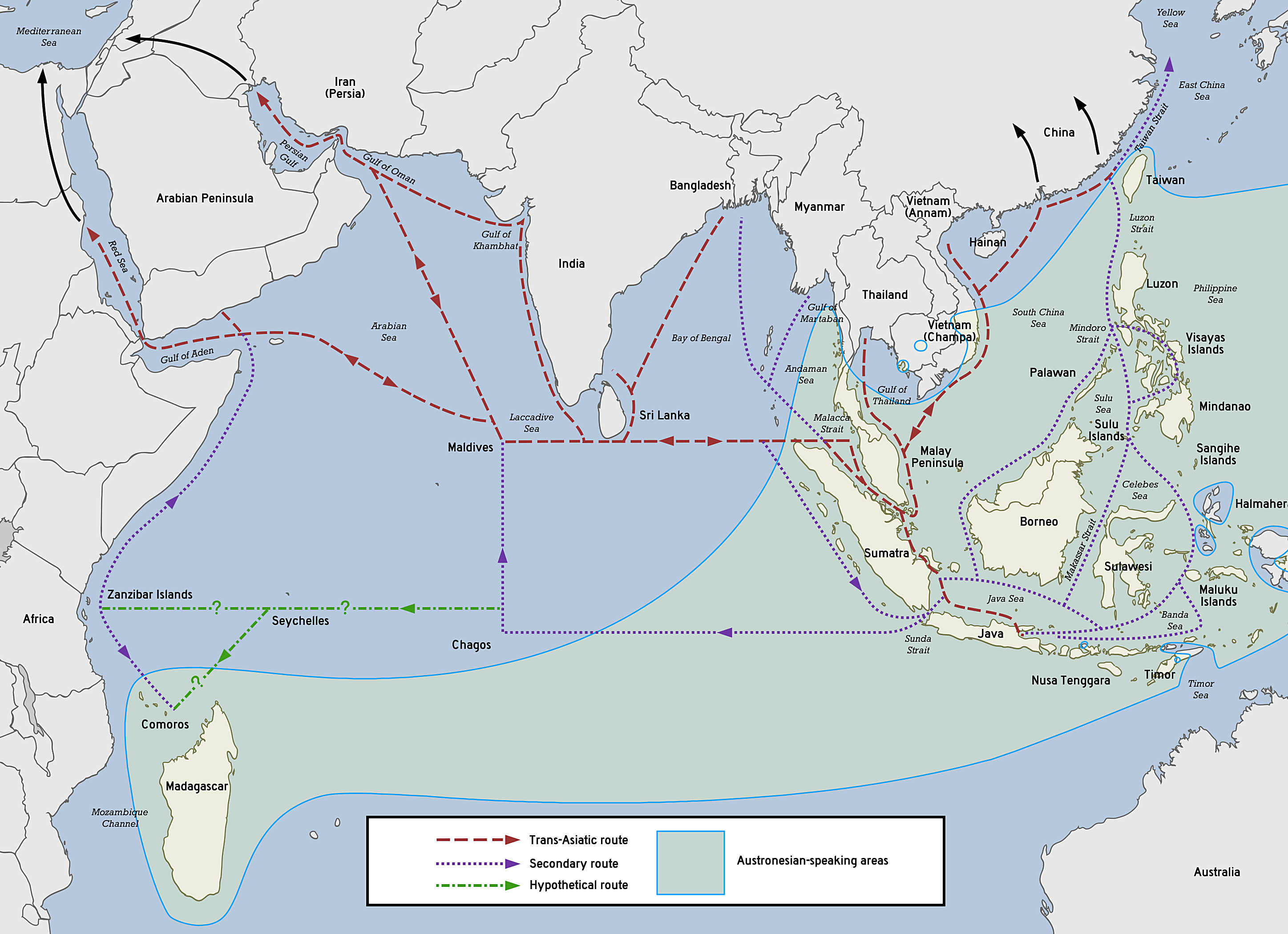
The Austronesian maritime trade network was the first trade routes in the Indian Ocean.

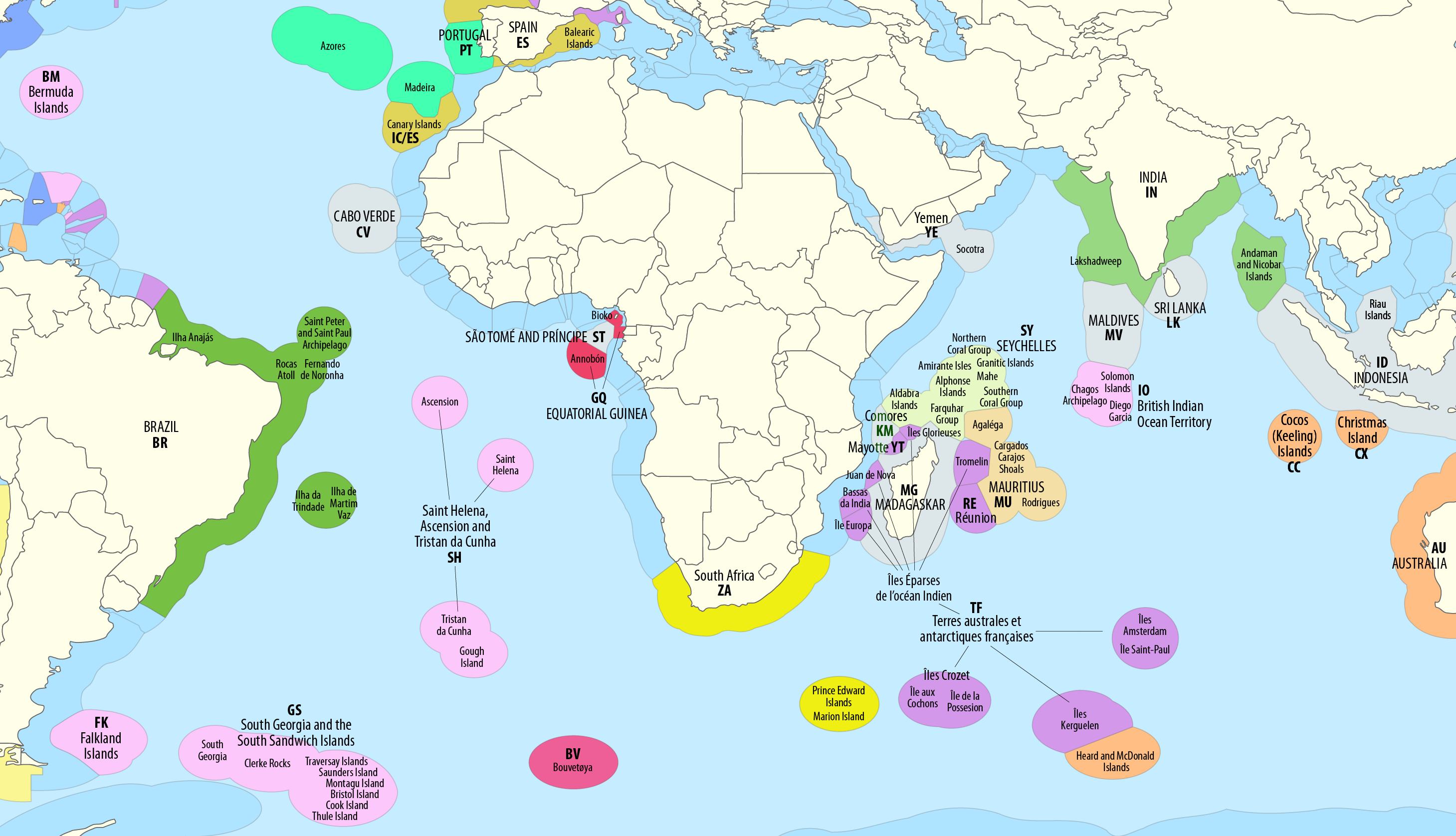
EEZs in the Atlantic and Indian Oceans.

The String of Pearls is a geopolitical hypothesis proposed by United States political researchers in 2004. It is the network of Chinese military and commercial facilities and relationships along its sea lines of communication which extend from mainland China to Port Sudan in the Horn of Africa. The sea lines run through several major maritime choke points such as the Strait of Mandeb, the Strait of Malacca, the Strait of Hormuz, and the Lombok Strait as well as other strategic maritime centres in Somalia and the littoral South Asian countries of Pakistan, Sri Lanka, Bangladesh, and the Maldives.

Many commentators in India believe this plan, together with the China–Pakistan Economic Corridor and other parts of China's Belt and Road Initiative under Chinese Communist Party general secretary Xi Jinping, is a threat to India's national security. Such a system would encircle India and threaten its power projection, trade, and potentially territorial integrity. Furthermore, China's support for India's traditional enemy of Pakistan and its Gwadar Port is viewed as a threat, compounded by fears that China may develop an overseas naval military base in Gwadar, which could allow China to conduct expeditionary warfare in the Indian Ocean Region. From the east, the deep-water port of Kyaukpyu is also viewed with a similar concern. The first comprehensive academic analyses of Chinese plan and its security implications for New Delhi was undertaken in February 2008 by an active-duty Indian naval officer. Antedating China's anti-piracy naval deployment in the Indian Ocean beginning in December 2008, and the ensuing acquisition of its first overseas military base in Djibouti in August 2017, his analysis predicting China's "permanent military presence" in the Indian Ocean is viewed by Indian policymakers as prescient. Accordingly, India has since been making moves of various types to counter the threat.

The term as a geopolitical concept was first used in an internal US Department of Defense report, "Energy Futures in Asia" in 2005. The term is also widely used in India's geopolitical and foreign policy narratives to highlight India's concerns over massive Chinese Belt and Road Initiative projects across southern Asia. According to the EUISS, the formation of Quadrilateral Security Dialogue (consisting of Australia, India, Japan, and the United States) is a direct result of China's assertive foreign and security policy in the Indo-Pacific region.

The emergence of the String of Pearls is indicative of China's growing geopolitical influence through concerted efforts to increase access to ports and airfields, expand and modernise military forces, and foster stronger diplomatic relationships with trading partners. The Chinese government insists that China's burgeoning naval strategy is entirely peaceful and is only for the protection of regional trade interests. Chinese Communist Party general secretaries Hu Jintao and Xi Jinping have both asserted that China will never seek hegemony in foreign relations. A 2013 analysis by The Economist also found the Chinese moves to be commercial in nature. Although it has been claimed that China's actions are creating a security dilemma between China and India in the Indian Ocean, that has been questioned by some analysts, who point to China's fundamental strategic vulnerabilities.

== Terminology ==
In the theory, a "pearl" refers to a current or potential Chinese overseas military base, mega infrastructure project, economic corridor, port or other city or locale of Chinese geostrategic advantage in the region. These "pearls" are designated by U.S. and Indian strategists. The eponymous "string" of these pearls refers to the possibility of the Chinese Navy connecting these pearls via maritime routes. Chinese political researchers do not use the term String of Pearls to describe their own geopolitical and diplomatic strategy, instead called the term "malicious defamation" from the United States.

== Origins ==
In 2004, the U.S. consulting firm Booz Allen Hamilton came up with the "string of pearls" hypothesis, which posits that China will try to expand its naval presence by building civilian maritime infrastructure along the Indian Ocean periphery. According to Pacific Forum researcher Virginia Marantidou, China held great anxiety toward its security environment in the Indian Ocean, due to potential U.S. and Indian blockade at the Malacca Strait. This situation, coined the "Malacca dilemma" by Chinese researchers, posed significant challenges to the government elites in Beijing. David H. Shinn predicted in 2008 that China will need to expand their naval capacities in order to protect supply lines of vital resources from Africa and the Middle East to China. American, European, and Indian political strategists have used the term to designates China's point of influences in Indo-Pacific region.

China's rapid economic development over the course of the last quarter century has been heavily dependent on foreign sources of energy, and it is likely that foreign sources of energy will prove even more critical to the continued growth of the Chinese economy. The sea lines of communication that link the Chinese mainland with ports throughout the Middle East and coasts of Africa have become a major source of conflict with respect to China's energy security.

China is the world's largest oil consumer and the largest oil importer. Oil imported from the Gulf States and Africa comprises 70% of total Chinese oil imports, and remains China's most critical source of energy apart from domestic coal burning and nuclear power. To meet future demand, China has signed a number of long-term contracts to develop Iranian oil fields and to build a pipeline, refinery, and port in Sudan for oil export.

The oversea transport of oil from existing production areas will continue to remain the primary mode of energy importation for the foreseeable future. Efforts to secure new supply lines in Central Asia have proven difficult, with poor infrastructure, political instability, logistical challenges, and corruption hampering energy development there. Energy security also sits at the core of China's anti-piracy efforts, which figure into its larger maritime objectives. The expansion of Chinese naval patrols off the Coast of Somalia, and China's decision to join multi-nation defence patrols in 2010, indicate China's greater assertiveness in the policing of shipping corridors.

== Facilities and relationships ==
=== South China Sea ===
The critical sea lines of communication that connect China to Middle Eastern oil-producing states traverse the South China Sea, making it a key strategic region, and potential trouble spot, for the Chinese government. Chinese naval vessels heavily patrol South China Sea waters, and conflicting territorial claims in the region have periodically erupted in naval confrontations. Chinese efforts to control the South China Sea have therefore figured significantly in speculations about the wider ambitions of the Chinese central government in the construction of a power projection chain across Asia.

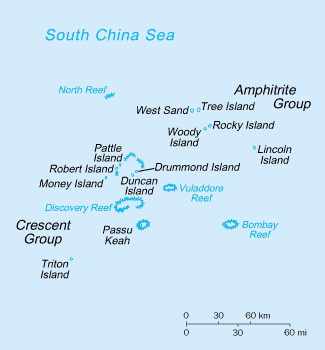
The Paracel Islands, a disputed territory under Chinese control in the South China Sea

The central government's efforts to exercise greater control in the region began in earnest after the power vacuum created by the withdrawal of US forces from the Philippines in 1991. Although skirmishes with neighbouring powers, most notably with Vietnam during the Sino-Vietnamese War of 1979, have been a fixture of post-war Chinese foreign relations, the Chinese government began aggressively asserting its territorial claims in the region only within the last two decades. Interest in the region has historically extended to the rich fishing and mineral resources known to exist there. However, islets in the regions can also be used as air and sea bases for intelligence, surveillance, and reconnaissance activities, as well as base points for Chinese ballistic missile submarines and potential aircraft carrier battle groups.

The Chinese naval base on Hainan Island is generally considered the first of the pearls or potential pearls. Recent construction of an underwater submarine base on Hainan, in addition to the sprawling facilities already located there, seems to further confirm the perceived importance of Hainan as a base of control for China's claims in the South China Sea. Woody Island, the largest of the Paracel Islands, hosts an upgraded Chinese airstrip and has also been identified as a pearl. Sansha, the prefecture-level city established on Woody Island, maintains a division-level garrison that also oversees Chinese claims in the Spratly Islands, extending a small but permanent military presence across Chinese claims in the South China Sea. A $20 billion Chinese proposal aimed at Thailand to fund the construction of a canal across the Kra Isthmus, which would allow ships to bypass the Strait of Malacca altogether, has also broached concerns of a Chinese-controlled corridor linking Chinese ports and facilities elsewhere in the South China Sea to the Indian Ocean.

=== Indian Ocean ===
Chinese possessions in the Indian Ocean consist primarily of commercial ports owned and operated by Chinese firms, as well as resupply stations operating in agreement with the Chinese central government. The two largest projects consist of a Chinese-financed commercial shipping center in Hambantota, Sri Lanka, and a Chinese-controlled deep-water port near the mouth of the Persian Gulf in Gwadar, Pakistan, which is also the crux of China's massive $62 billion China–Pakistan Economic Corridor project. Both sites have raised the concern of neighbouring powers, most significantly India, which fears the possibility of a string of Chinese bases situated just off its coast. Chinese investment in Hambantota, and Sri Lanka's dialogue partner status in the Shanghai Cooperation Organisation (SCO), is seen by some Indian analysts as reflective of a wider encirclement strategy on the part of the Chinese (though India itself would join in 2017 as a full member). The port at Gwadar, which is connected to the Karakoram Highway linking Western China and the Arabian Sea, is of even greater concern to the Indian government, which views it as powerful evidence of Chinese and Pakistani collusion against Indian security and economic interests.

=== Pakistan ===
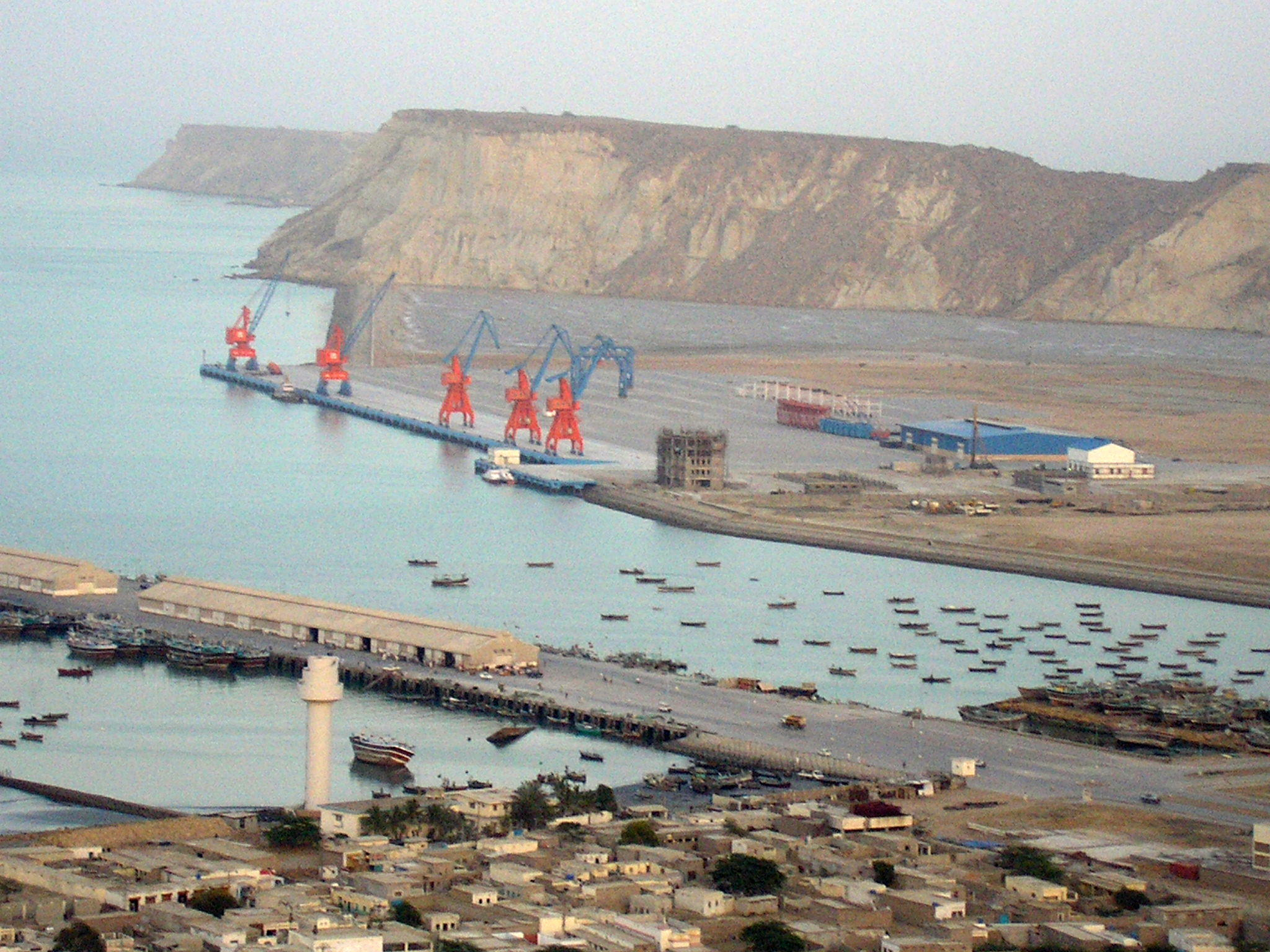
Gwadar Port in southwestern Pakistan

For both Pakistan and China, the Gwadar port as part of the much-wide China Pakistan Economic Corridor offers a number of key benefits. For the Pakistani government, the Gwadar port is seen as having the potential of hedging against a potential Indian blockade of the port of Karachi, which currently handles 90% of Pakistani seaborne trade. For the Chinese central government, which has funded the majority of the $1.2 billion construction, Gwadar represents an important strategic foothold situated only 240 miles from the Strait of Hormuz. Chinese government officials have specifically identified the growing militarisation of Central Asia, as a chief motivation in the construction of the Gwadar project. In 2013, the state-owned China Overseas Port Holding Company was officially granted control of the port's operation, further consolidating Chinese influence over the Gwadar project.

=== Other countries ===
Similar port construction projects are also underway in Burma and Bangladesh. The Chinese government has financed a container shipping facility in Chittagong, Bangladesh, which is widely identified as a pearl in the string. However, despite reports of Chittagong's potential military role for the Chinese, the Bangladeshi government has insisted that the port is of an entirely commercial nature and declared it off limits to military vessels. Furthermore, given Bangladesh's close economic ties to India, and agreements for the expansion of Indian investment in Bangladeshi infrastructure projects, Chittagong's military significance for the Chinese is exaggerated. China as a part of BRI is planning to construct deep-sea port at Kyaukphyu, on Myanmar's west coast which is 970 km from India's Andaman and Nicobar islands, at an estimated cost of $7 billion.

Strategists have also identified the Marao Atoll, in the Maldives, as a potential Chinese military base of operations. Reports in the Indian press have referred to Chinese plans to construct a submarine base in Marao since at least 1999. However, to date there exists no evidence that suggests a Chinese military presence of any kind in the Maldives. Indeed, it is argued that Marao cannot possibly support the type of complex infrastructure required for submarine operations. And given the nature of diplomatic and military co-operation between India and the Maldives, Chinese encroachment in the Maldives Archipelago is highly unlikely. Many analysts have suggested that Chinese Indian Ocean bases are purely commercial because they would be nearly indefensible in wartime. A large component of China's efforts to establish ports and bases in the Indian Ocean is the result of a need to formalise logistics support agreements for Chinese naval forces conducting anti-piracy efforts off the Horn of Africa.

Chinese state-owned companies are also responsible for the construction of a railway link between Khartoum, the capital of Sudan, and Port Sudan, the country's major port on the Red Sea. Although Sudanese oil makes up only a fraction of total Chinese imports, China has invested over $10 billion in infrastructure projects in the country to take advantage of its substantial oil reserves. Chinese operations in Port Sudan are substantial, but limited completely to the oil export. China had also agreed to finance and build a US$10 billion port in Bagamoyo, Tanzania to handle 20 million shipping containers annually, which was begun in 2017. The Chinese government denied that their investment in the port of Bagamoyo is intended to create a military capability. In 2019 Tanzanian President John Magufuli announced the suspension of the project. China has also set up a first-ever abroad naval base in Djibouti. China started building the base in February 2016 in Djibouti with an estimated cost of $600 million. It is located in the Horn of Africa at the entrance to the Red Sea on the route to the Suez Canal which gives China a strategic advantage. China pays $20 million a year as rent for the Djibouti base.

== Responses ==
=== China ===
China views its actions as valid efforts to strengthen a new maritime Silk Road.

China's growing economic investments have increased their concerns about the political stability of the countries they are investing in. International relations commentators have compared this to the United States investing in internal stability and security of countries where the US has large commercial interests.

=== India ===
In 2007, the Indian Navy published the "Indian Maritime Doctrine", a document outlining prospective Indian naval strategies. It describes ambitions for an active Indian naval presence from the Strait of Hormuz to the Strait of Malacca. Furthermore, the doctrine makes explicit mention of the need to police international shipping lanes and control choke points of Indian Ocean trade in particular. In 2007, India opened its second overseas military listening post in northern Madagascar, with the aim of better overseeing shipping movements through the Mozambique Channel. The Indian government has, with the same intentions, hosted negotiations with Mauritius regarding the construction of an airstrip for Indian surveillance aircraft, as well as organised the construction of radar stations in the Maldives.

In 2011, the Indian government further announced that it would fund a deep-water port in Sittwe, Burma; set to be functional by June 2013, with an additional highway connecting the port to India to be completed by 2014. The construction of the Sittwe port is often cited as evidence of a concerted strategy on the part of India to counterbalance growing Chinese influence in Southeast Asia.

Like China, India is heavily dependent on foreign oil producers for its energy needs. About 89% of India's oil arrives by ship, and the burning of oil provides for approximately 33% of India's energy needs. The protection of the major sea lines of communication is therefore recognised as an economic imperative. In this regard, India has historically focused heavily on anti-piracy and counter-terrorism efforts across the Indian Ocean. Most notable among these is Operation Island Watch, the 2010 effort to patrol India's western seaboard against Somali pirates.

Somali piracy in the Indian Ocean

A number of these counter-terrorism and anti-piracy efforts have been conducted in co-ordination with American forces, though Indian officials have traditionally restricted joint military exercises to common interest initiatives, often those under UN sanction. Nevertheless, renewed US interest in countering the threat of Islamic terrorism in South Asia has pushed India and the United States towards more substantive military co-operation. For US military officials and strategists, this growing bilateral relationship is widely seen as an opportunity to counterbalance threats of Chinese regional hegemony. Efforts for bilateral co-operation against rising Chinese power are bolstered by popular fears that China's expanded presence in the Indian Ocean threatens India's economic and military security.

Dean Cheng, a China expert at The Heritage Foundation, strongly urged that the United States continue to partner with India to counter China's influence in the Indian Ocean.

Further, a strategy known as Necklace of Diamonds is being applied to counter Chinese growing influence and its contentious territorial, diplomatic or commercial issues in the South China Sea, Indian Ocean and with ASEAN nations. This strategy is especially to counter the string of pearls and New Silk route. India strengthens ties with Vietnam, Oman, Indonesia, Japan, Mongolia, Singapore, Seychelles and all five Central Asian Republics to conduct joint army, airforce and naval exercises (see also China Rim). Necklace of Diamonds includes the development of naval bases, air corridor, boasting multilateral trade. The String of Pearls is considered by some Indian commentators as a manifestation of China's salami slicing strategy.

=== United States ===
The US Navy has unparalleled power projection capabilities and operational strength, and is the major naval force in the waters of South and Southeast Asia. However, the Chinese central government's explicit ambitions for the creation of a "new security concept", one that can challenge US dominance in the region, has precipitated a greater willingness on the part of the Chinese to challenge US influence in Asia. China's renewed assertiveness in the South China Sea is of particular concern to US officials, who see China's rise as a threat to the United States' role as a "provider of regional and global stability".

The "Pivot to Asia" strategy of the Obama Administration is designed to engage China by consolidating and expanding diplomatic and economic relationships with existing regional partners, particularly in East Asia and Southeast Asia. This approach has emphasised multilateralism, as exemplified by increased US engagement with ASEAN and efforts for the formation of the Trans-Pacific Partnership, a pan-Asian free trade deal. However, the US has also sought an expanded and more cooperative military presence in the region, evidenced by the 2006 Cope India exercise and others like it. Strong US relations with its key regional allies, including Japan, Taiwan, and South Korea, have been reinforced by strengthened co-operation with countries threatened by Chinese control, such as the Philippines.

=== Japan ===
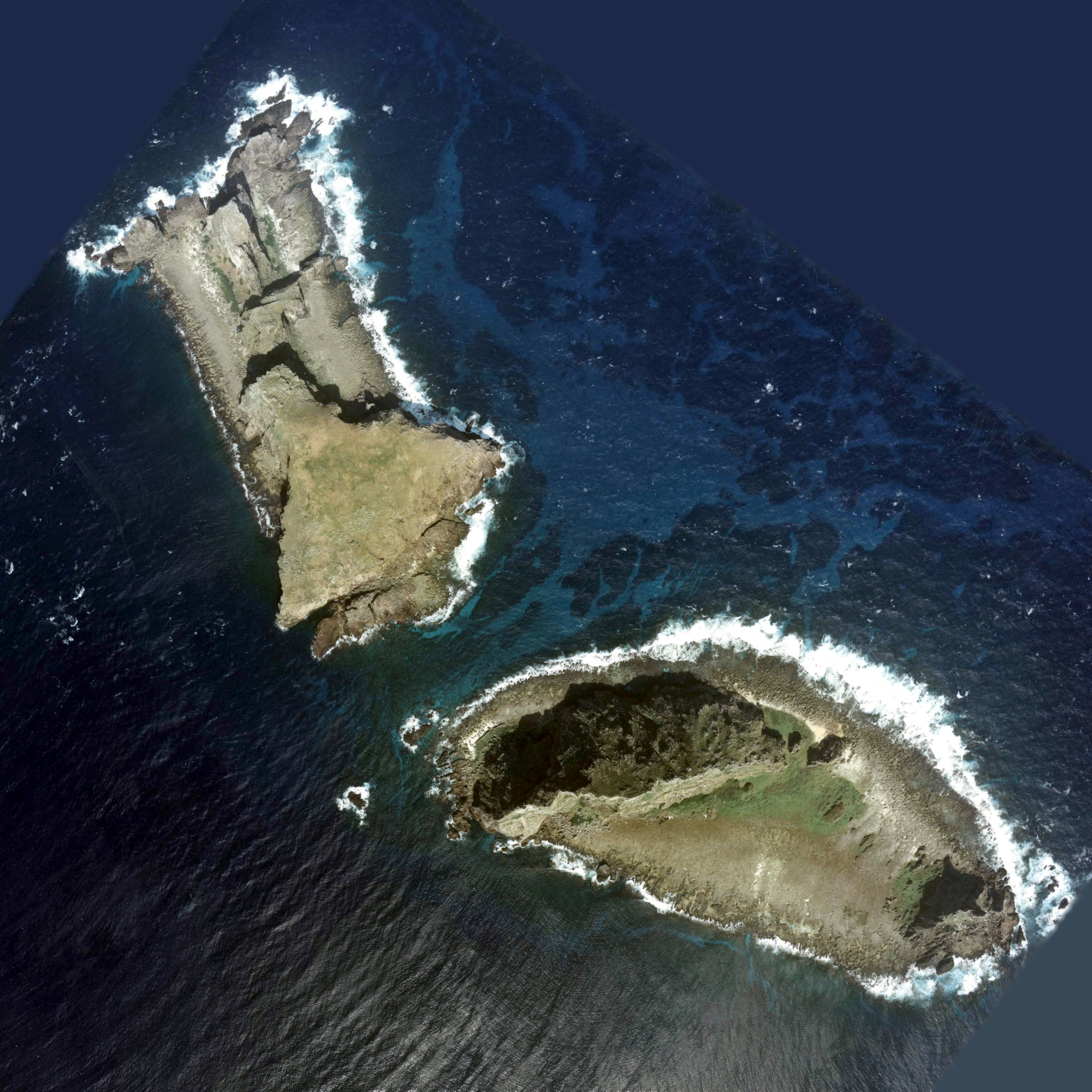
Two of the disputed Senkaku islets – Kitakojima (left) and Minamikojima (right)

Japanese apprehensions regarding the development of an interconnected system of Chinese military and commercial ports centers primarily on the protection of trading interests. 90% of Japan's imported oil flows to Japan through the sea lanes of the South China Sea, and any undue Chinese influence in the region is seen as a potential threat to Japanese economic security. Moreover, Japanese officials envision that, in the case of a more pervasive Chinese power projection capability in East Asia, territorial disputes between China and Japan in the East China Sea and Philippine Sea might escalate to a point of outright military confrontation. In particular, the Senkaku, which is claimed by China but controlled by Japan, and Ryukyu island chains, are identified as key friction points between the two countries. Both island groups are located off of China's eastern seaboard and must be navigated by Chinese naval and commercial vessels sailing on their way to the wider Pacific Ocean. Furthermore, the proximity of both island groups to Taiwan offers them an attractive operational role for Chinese military planners looking to mitigate US naval superiority in any potential war over Taiwan.

In 2010, in part because of increased diplomatic tension with China, Japan announced revised National Defence Program guidelines, which advocate enhanced surveillance and reconnaissance operations in the Ryukyu islands, as well as the increased support for submarine activities. At the US–Japan Security Consultative Committee on 21 June 2011, the Japanese and US governments issued a firm joint declaration announcing intentions for the maintenance of the strong US naval deterrent in the Taiwan Strait and the expansion of security ties with ASEAN, Australia, and India. Japanese Prime Minister Shinzo Abe's has described this new China-wary foreign policy as having the potential to create an "arc of freedom" between Japan and its traditional allies the US and Australia, and India. This project is bolstered by the 2008 security co-operation agreement between Japan and India, which calls for greater maritime security co-ordination and diplomatic co-operation on regional issues.

=== Australia ===
The Australian government has repeatedly expressed concern about mounting tensions in East Asia and Southeast Asia, with the security of Australia's so-called "Northern approaches" seen by lawmakers and officials as essential to the security of seaborne trade and energy supply routes. As a reaction to China's growing influence, and as part of the United States' proclaimed "Pivot to Asia" strategy, the Australian government approved the stationing of US troops and aircraft in the northern Australian city of Darwin in late 2011.

== See also ==
=== Chinese geostrategy ===
- Belt and Road Initiative
- Chinese Century
- Chinese salami slicing strategy
- Nine-dash line
- Territorial disputes of China (category)

=== Countering geostrategy ===
- AirSea Battle
- Blue Dot Network
- Blue Team (U.S. politics)
- Double fish hook strategy
- Geostrategy in Central Asia
- Indo-Pacific
- Island chain strategy
- Malabar (naval exercise)
- Quadrilateral Security Dialogue
- United States foreign policy toward the People's Republic of China

=== General articles ===
- China–India relations
- China–United States relations
