= United States foreign policy toward the People's Republic of China =

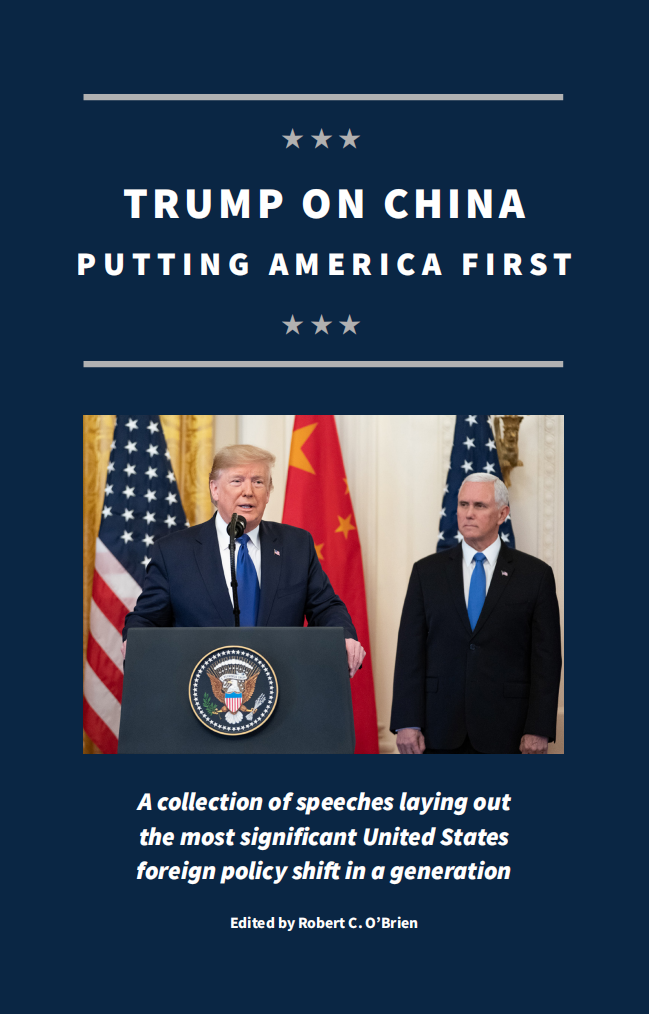
At the beginning of the first Trump administration, the U.S. foreign policy toward China has shifted from "engagement" to "competition".

The United States foreign policy toward the People's Republic of China originated during the Cold War. At that time, the U.S. had a containment policy against communist states. The leaked Pentagon Papers indicated the efforts by the U.S. to contain China through military actions undertaken in the Vietnam War. The containment policy centered around an island chain strategy. In 1972, President Richard Nixon's China rapprochement signaled a shift in focus to gain leverage in containing the Soviet Union. Formal diplomatic ties between the U.S. and China were established in 1979, and with normalized trade relations since 2000, the U.S. and China have been linked by closer economic ties and more cordial relations. In his first term as U.S. president, Barack Obama said, "We want China to succeed and prosper. It's good for the United States if China continues on the path of development that it's on".

During the 2010s and early 2020s, there was a significant shift in America's China policy. U.S. military presence in the region, efforts to improve relations with India and Vietnam, and the Obama administration's 2012 "Pivot to Asia" strategy for increased American involvement in the Western Pacific, have been associated with a policy aimed at countering China's growing clout. Current U.S. military presence in the region includes military alliances with South Korea, with Japan, and with the Philippines. The Indo-Pacific region has become the focus of competition between the two powers. The term "strategic competition" has been frequently used by the United States government to describe the economic, technological, and geopolitical relationship between the U.S. and China, which had intensified in recent years. The first Trump administration stated, "The United States recognizes the long-term strategic competition between our two systems". It designated China as a "revisionist power" seeking to overturn the liberal international order and displace the United States, and called for a whole-of-government approach to China guided by a return to principled realism.

The Biden administration assessed that previous optimistic approaches to China were flawed, and that China poses "the most significant challenge of any nation-state in the world to the United States". China remains "the only competitor out there with both the intent to reshape the international order and, increasingly, a power to do so" according to the U.S.-released National Defense Strategy in 2022. However, the U.S. National Security Advisor, Jake Sullivan, has stated that the Biden administration does not pursue a fundamental transformation of the Chinese political system. The second Trump administration again saw a shift in China policy. The administration de-emphasized ideological and political conflict as well as concerns about China's human rights issues, and put the focus mainly on economic and military competition.

== Strategic background ==
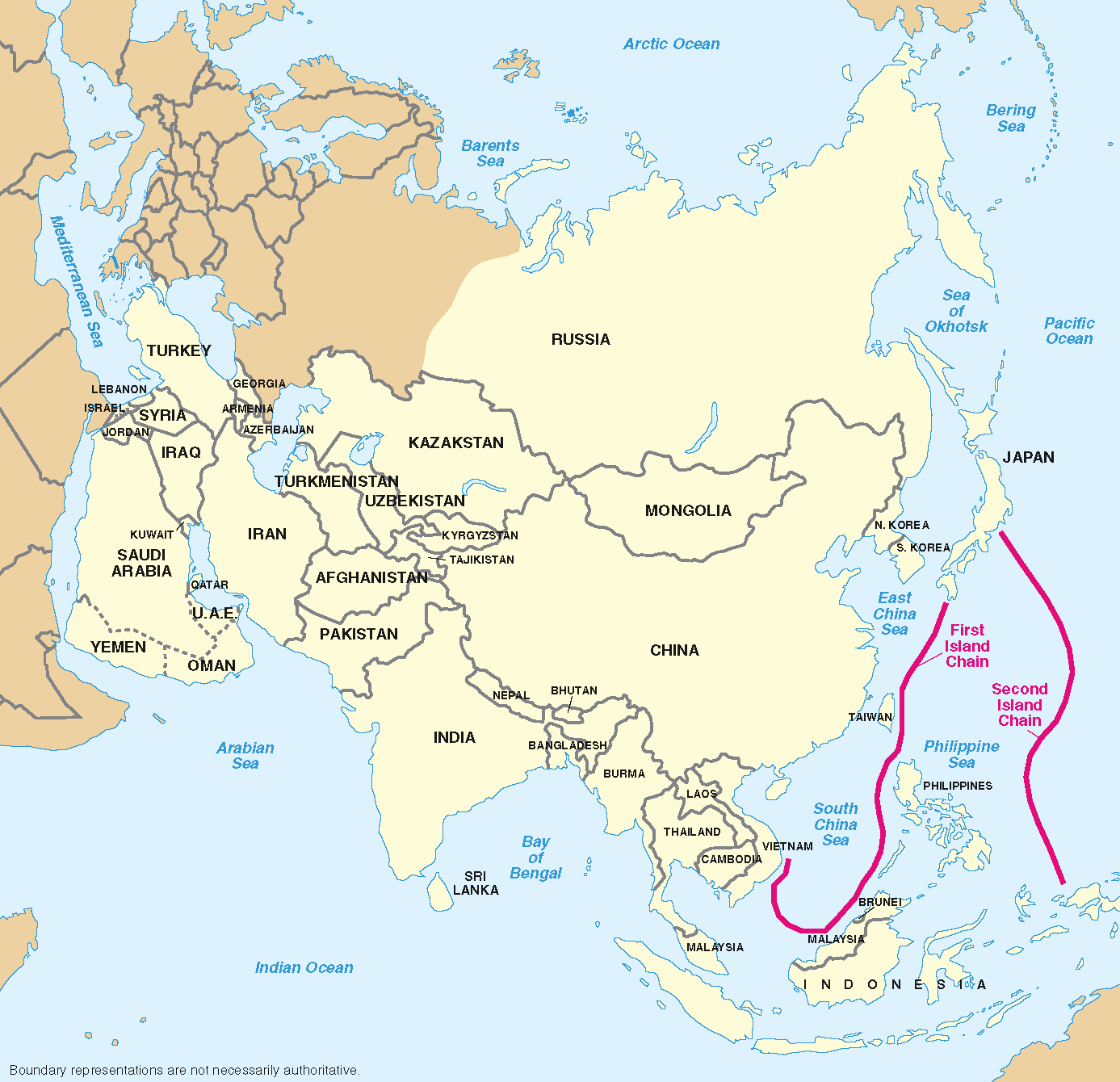
The First and Second island chains in America's Island Chain Strategy, studied by Chinese military strategists to avoid encirclement

=== Cold War era ===
After their defeat in the Chinese Civil War, parts of the Nationalist army retreated south and crossed the border into Burma. The United States supported these Nationalist forces because the United States hoped they would harass the People's Republic of China from the southwest, thereby diverting Chinese resources from the Korean War. The Burmese government protested and international pressure increased. Beginning in 1953, several rounds of withdrawals of the Nationalist forces and their families were carried out. In 1960, joint military action by China and Burma expelled the remaining Nationalist forces from Burma, although some went on to settle in the Burma-Thailand borderlands.

During the Cold War the United States tried to prevent the domino effect of the spread of communism and thwart communist countries including the People's Republic of China. Meanwhile, China supported North Vietnam and North Korea from 1950 onward as part of a strategy to establish a "security buffer zone" against the United States and the West. Washington assumed that communist North Vietnam would become a puppet state of China. The two former allies, however, eventually clashed in the 1979 Sino-Vietnamese War.

=== Post-Cold War ===
In more contemporary times, with the Nixon rapprochement and the signing of the Shanghai Communiqué, improvement in U.S.-Sino relations was made possible. Formal diplomatic ties were established in 1979, and with normalized trade relations since 2000, the US and China have been linked by closer economic ties.

The United States' 2006 Quadrennial Defense Review stated that China has "the greatest potential to compete militarily with the United States and field disruptive military technologies that could over time offset traditional U.S. military advantages absent U.S. counter strategies". The 2006 National Security Strategy stated that the U.S. wanted China to continue down the road of reform and opening up. It said that as economic growth continues, China would face a growing demand from its own people to follow the path of East Asia's many modern democracies, adding political freedom to economic freedom. The document continues by stating that China cannot stay on this peaceful path while holding on to "old ways of thinking and acting" that exacerbate regional and international security concerns. The U.S. referred to the "old ways" in terms of non-transparent military expansion, mercantilism, and supporting resource-rich regimes with a record of unacceptable behavior.

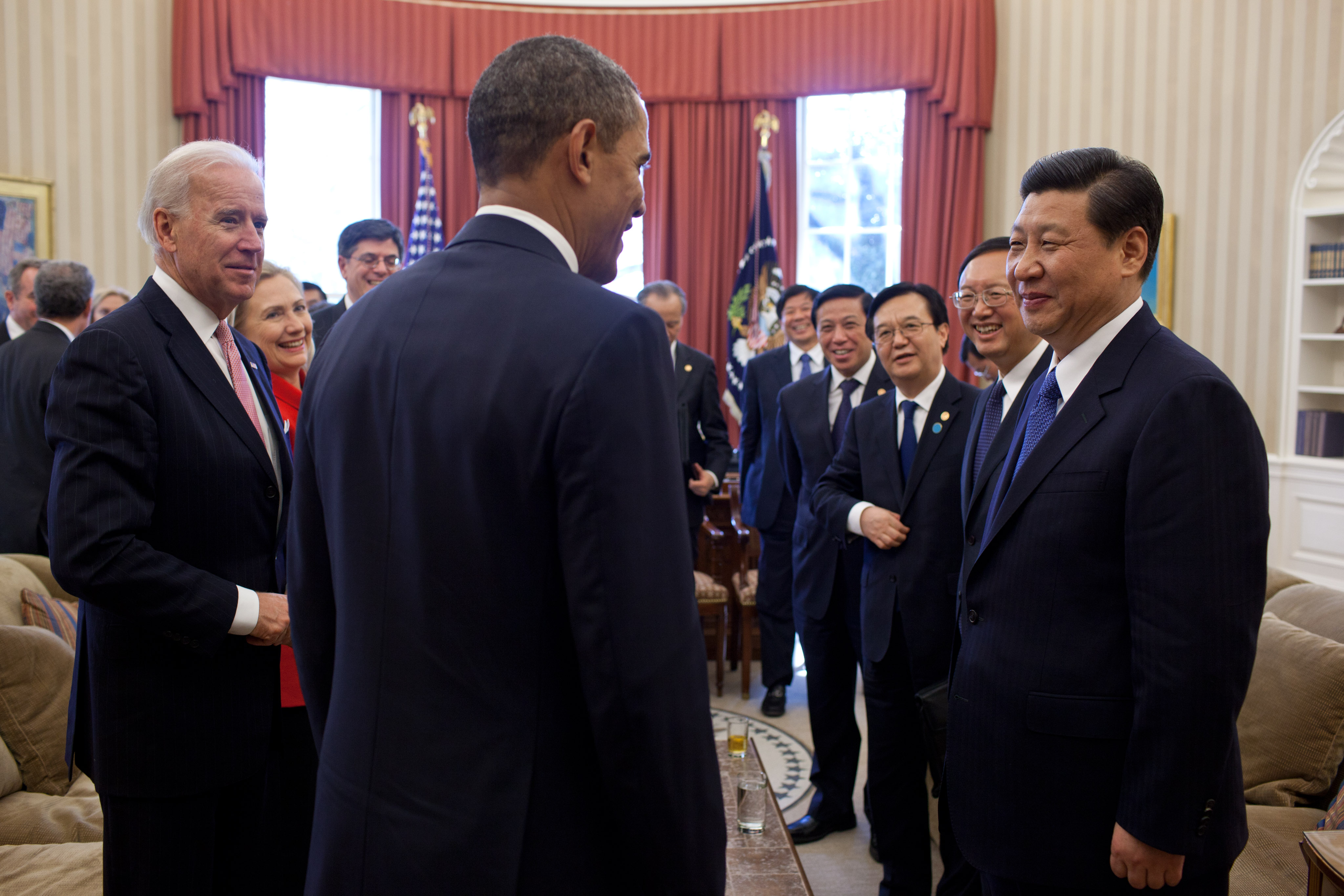
US President Barack Obama, Vice President Joe Biden and Foreign Secretary Hillary Clinton with Chinese Vice President Xi Jinping, February 2012

The United States' political leadership began to shift policy stances in 2011, starting with the Obama administration's "pivot" toward Asia. Then-secretary of state Hillary Clinton called for "increased investment—diplomatic, economic, strategic, and otherwise—in the Asia-Pacific region", which was seen as a move to counter China's growing clout. Supporters of increased American involvement in East Asia have cited the United States as a counterbalance to the excesses of Chinese expansion. Relevant to the argument is the fact that countries in territorial disputes with China, such as in the South China Sea and the Diaoyu/Senkaku Islands, have complained about China's harassment in the disputed areas. Some experts have suggested that China may leverage their economic strength in such disputes, one example being the sudden restriction on Chinese imports of Filipino bananas during tensions over the Scarborough Shoal.

== Recent development ==
In April 2019, the fourth iteration of the Committee on the Present Danger was launched as the Committee on the Present Danger: China (CPDC) in a press conference in Washington. The organization was reformed by former Trump administration White House Chief Strategist Steve Bannon and former Reagan administration official Frank Gaffney with the stated goal of "educate and inform American citizens and policymakers about the existential threats presented from the Peoples Republic of China under the misrule of the Chinese Communist Party". The CPDC takes the view that there is "no hope of coexistence with China as long as the Communist Party governs the country". Charles W. Freeman Jr. at the Watson Institute criticized the CPDC, describing it as what he believed to be a group of people with strong ideological leanings who lack expertise on China.

In a May 2019 opinion piece published by Foreign Policy, Paul Musgrave, an assistant professor at the University of Massachusetts Amherst commented that the first Trump administration hinted at a long-term strategy in dealing with the rise of China via a "slip" by then-director of policy planning Kiron Skinner at the US State Department. In a speech at the Future Security Forum on April 29, 2019, Skinner characterized the Cold War as "a huge fight within the Western family" where shared heritage allowed for breakthroughs; on China however, she argued that competition would be more complex, describing it as "... a fight with a really different civilization and a different ideology" and noting that "it's the first time that we will have a great-power competitor that is not Caucasian".

A study on China produced by a small working group within the department led by Skinner reportedly framed the U.S.-China competition in civilizational terms. The study was informally called "Letter X" in reference to George F. Kennan's X Article that advocated for a containment strategy against the Soviet Union. In August 2019, The New York Times reported that Skinner had departed from her role at the Department of State, and that Trump administration officials distanced themselves from her remarks. Earlier in the year, an open letter titled "China is not an enemy" was released by five China-focused scholars and foreign policy experts, and was endorsed by some business leaders, in which they decried what they saw in the U.S. approach as "counterproductive", and urged the Trump administration to continue the more "cooperative" approach.

With evolving discussions on the role of the North Atlantic Treaty Organization (NATO) in the post–Cold War era, NATO countries have not officially labeled the PRC an outright "enemy", but former NATO chief Jens Stoltenberg acknowledged the "challenges" posed by China's growing global influence at a NATO event in 2019, stating, "China will soon have the world's biggest economy. And it already has the second largest defense budget, investing heavily in new capabilities." He also said that NATO did not seek to "create new adversaries". The United States' NATO representative at the event referred to China as a "competitor".

According to a report by Reuters, in 2019 the United States CIA engaged in efforts on Chinese social media to highlight criticisms of the General secretaryship of Xi Jinping in an effort to shape Chinese public opinions. The campaign reportedly focused on narratives that included allegations of Communist Party leaders' financial activities overseas and concerns regarding transparency in the Belt and Road Initiative. As part of the campaign, the CIA also targeted other countries where the United States and China were competing for influence.

On May 20, 2020, in accordance with the John S. McCain National Defense Authorization Act for Fiscal Year 2019, the Trump administration delivered a report, "U.S. Strategic Approach to the People's Republic of China" to members of the U.S. Congress. The report states a whole-of-government approach to China under the 2017 National Security Strategy, which says it is time the U.S. "rethink the failed policies of the past two decades – policies based on the assumption that engagement with rivals and their inclusion in international institutions and global commerce would turn them into benign actors and trustworthy partners". The report says it "reflects a fundamental reevaluation of how the United States understands and responds to" the leaders of China, adding "The United States recognizes the long-term strategic competition between our two systems."

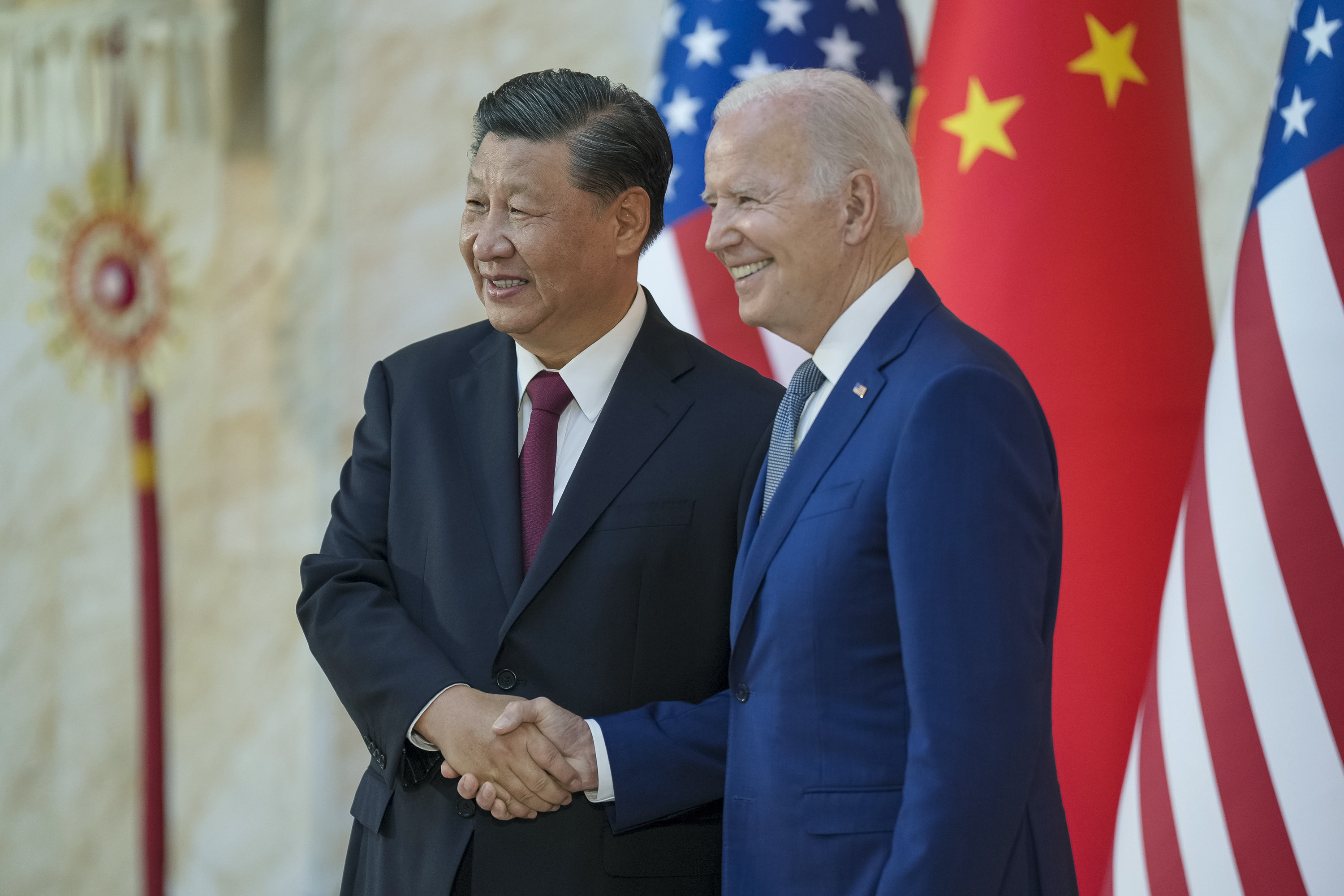
U.S. President Joe Biden and Chinese leader Xi Jinping at the G20 summit in Bali, November 2022

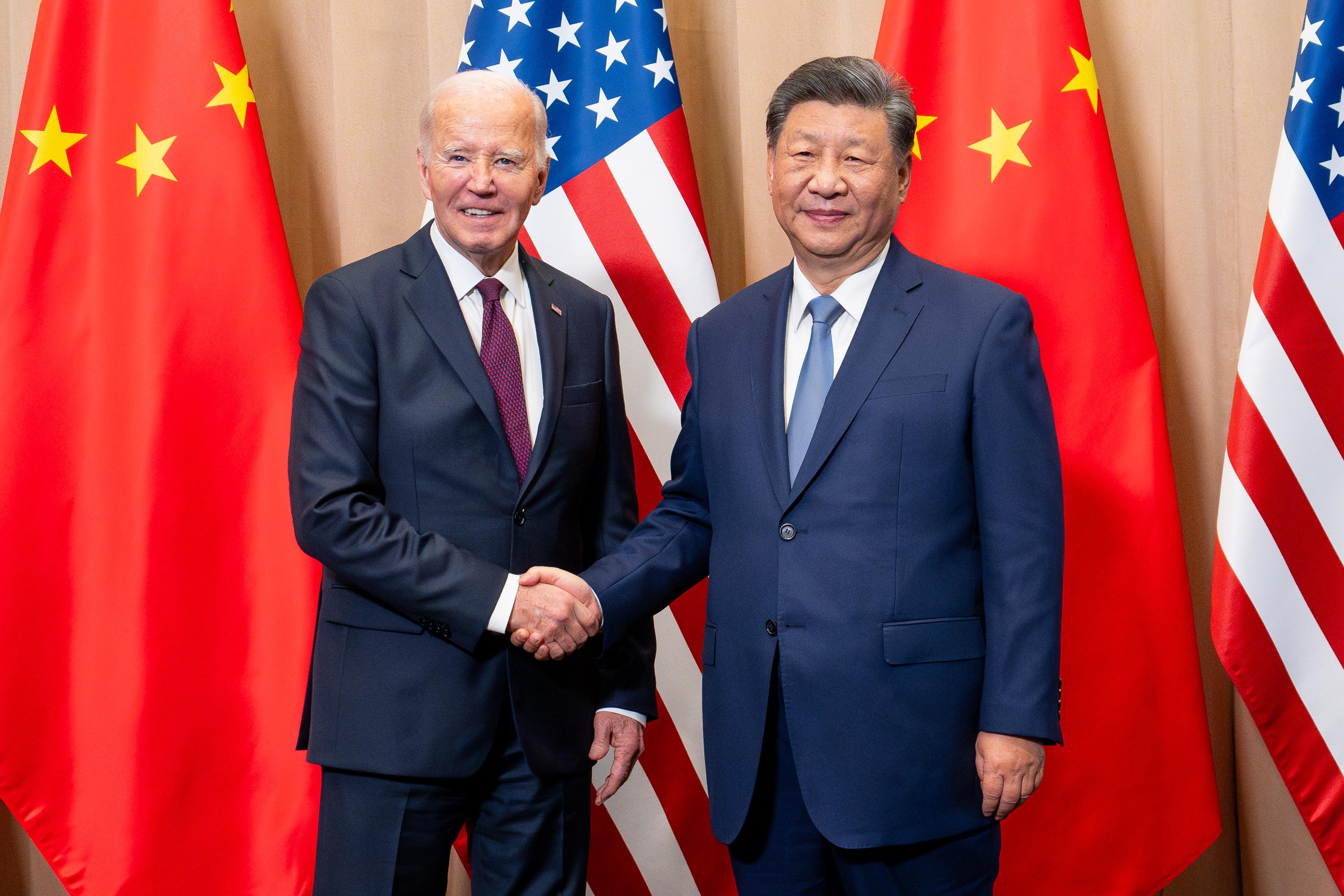
U.S. President Joe Biden and Chinese leader Xi Jinping at the APEC summit in Lima, November 2024

In February 2021, U.S. president Joe Biden said that China is the "most serious competitor" that poses challenges on the "prosperity, security, and democratic values" of the U.S. U.S. secretary of state Antony Blinken stated that previous optimistic approaches to China were flawed, and that China poses "the most significant challenge of any nation-state in the world to the United States". Blinken also agreed that Biden's predecessor, Donald Trump, "was right in taking a tougher approach to China".

In April 2021, the U.S. Senate introduced major legislation in response to China's growing clout in international affairs. The bill, titled "Strategic Competition Act of 2021", reflects hardline attitude of both congressional Democrats and Republicans, and sets out to counter the Chinese government's diplomatic and strategic initiatives. Senate Foreign Relations Committee Chairman Bob Menendez (D-NJ) said, "The Strategic Competition Act of 2021 is a recognition that this moment demands a unified, strategic response that can rebuild American leadership, invest in our ability to out-compete China, and reground diplomacy in our core values", adding "The United States government must be clear-eyed and sober about Beijing's intentions and actions, and calibrate our policy and strategy accordingly."

In May 2021, the Strategic Competition Act of 2021 was consolidated into a larger bill, the United States Innovation and Competition Act (USICA), authorizing US$110 billion for basic and advanced technology research over a five-year period. In June 2021, the USICA passed 68–32 in the Senate with bipartisan support. A modified version of the bill eventually became law on August 9, 2022, as the CHIPS and Science Act.

In December 2025, the second Trump administration released its National Security Strategy. Regarding China, the document calls to "rebalance America's economic relationship with China, prioritizing reciprocity and fairness to restore American economic independence" but also states "trade with China should be balanced and focused on non-sensitive factors" and favors "maintaining a genuinely mutually advantageous economic relationship with Beijing". It states the US wants to prevent war in the Indo-Pacific, and states the US "will build a military capable of denying aggression anywhere in the First Island Chain". Regarding Taiwan, the document states that "deterring a conflict over Taiwan, ideally by preserving military overmatch, is a priority" and that the US "does not support any unilateral change to the status quo in the Taiwan Strait".

=== Military strategy ===
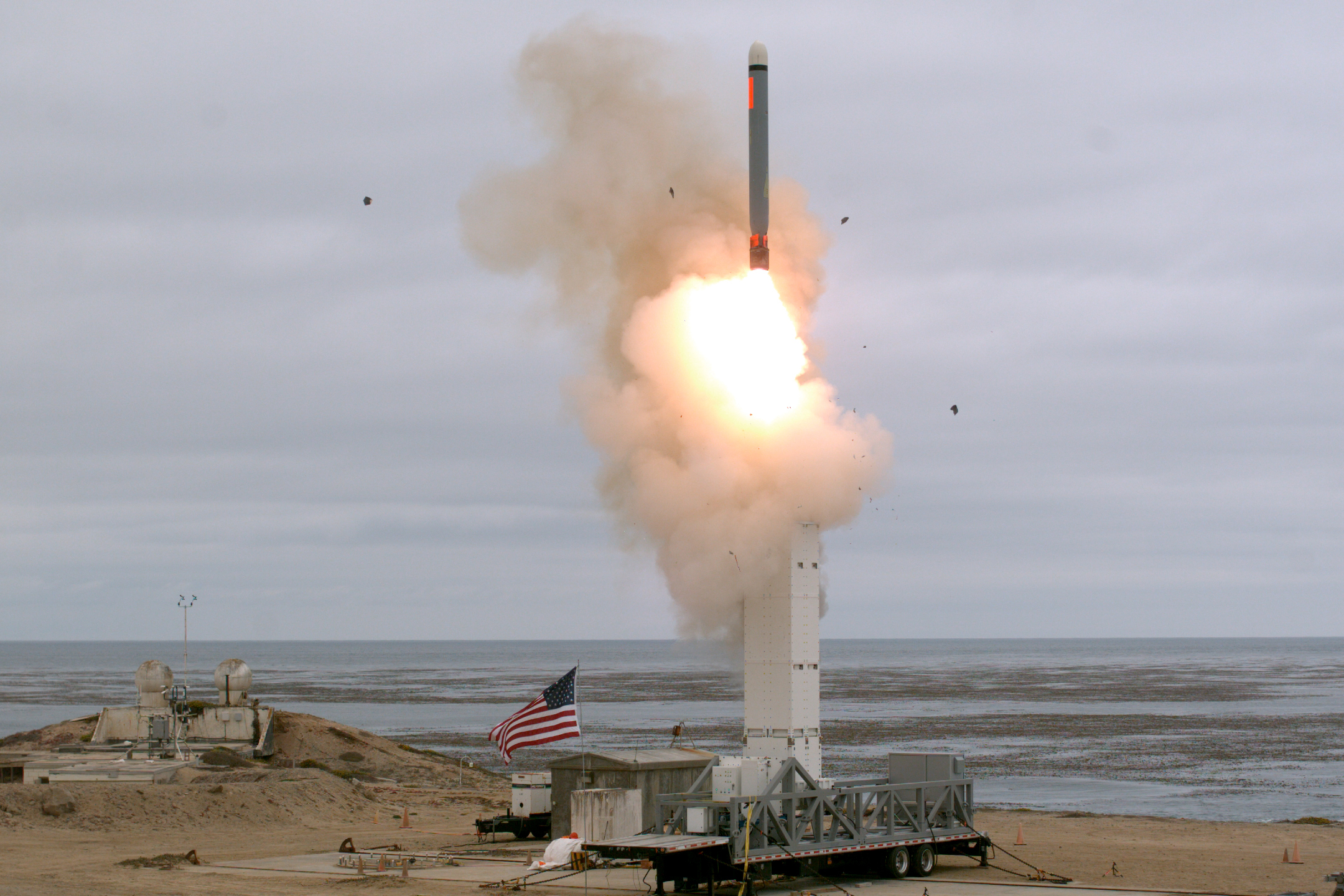
United States test firing a conventionally configured ground-launched medium-range cruise missile on 18 August 2019

The United States' Indo-Pacific strategy has broadly been to use the surrounding countries around China to blunt its influence. This includes strengthening the bonds between South Korea and Japan as well as trying to get India, another large developing country to help with their efforts. Additionally, with the US withdrawal from the Intermediate-Range Nuclear Forces Treaty with Russia (in part because China wasn't a party to it), the US has reportedly wanted to find a host in the Asia-Pacific region to point the previously banned weapons at China. In addition to soft power diplomacy within the region, the US is physically surrounding China with military bases in the event of any conflict. The United States has developed many military bases in the Asia Pacific equipped with warships, nuclear missiles and nuclear-capable strategic bombers as a deterrent and to achieve full spectrum dominance in a strategy similar to that of the Cold War.

In October 2023, President Joe Biden asked Congress for US$4 billion to counter China's financing efforts in developing countries and bolster security in the Indo-Pacific.

=== Sanctions ===
The use of economic sanctions has always been a tool of American foreign policy and has become used more frequently in the 21st century, from targeting individuals and sometimes whole countries by using the centrality of the US financial system and the position of the US dollar as the world's reserve currency to limit trade and cashflow.

==== Xinjiang ====
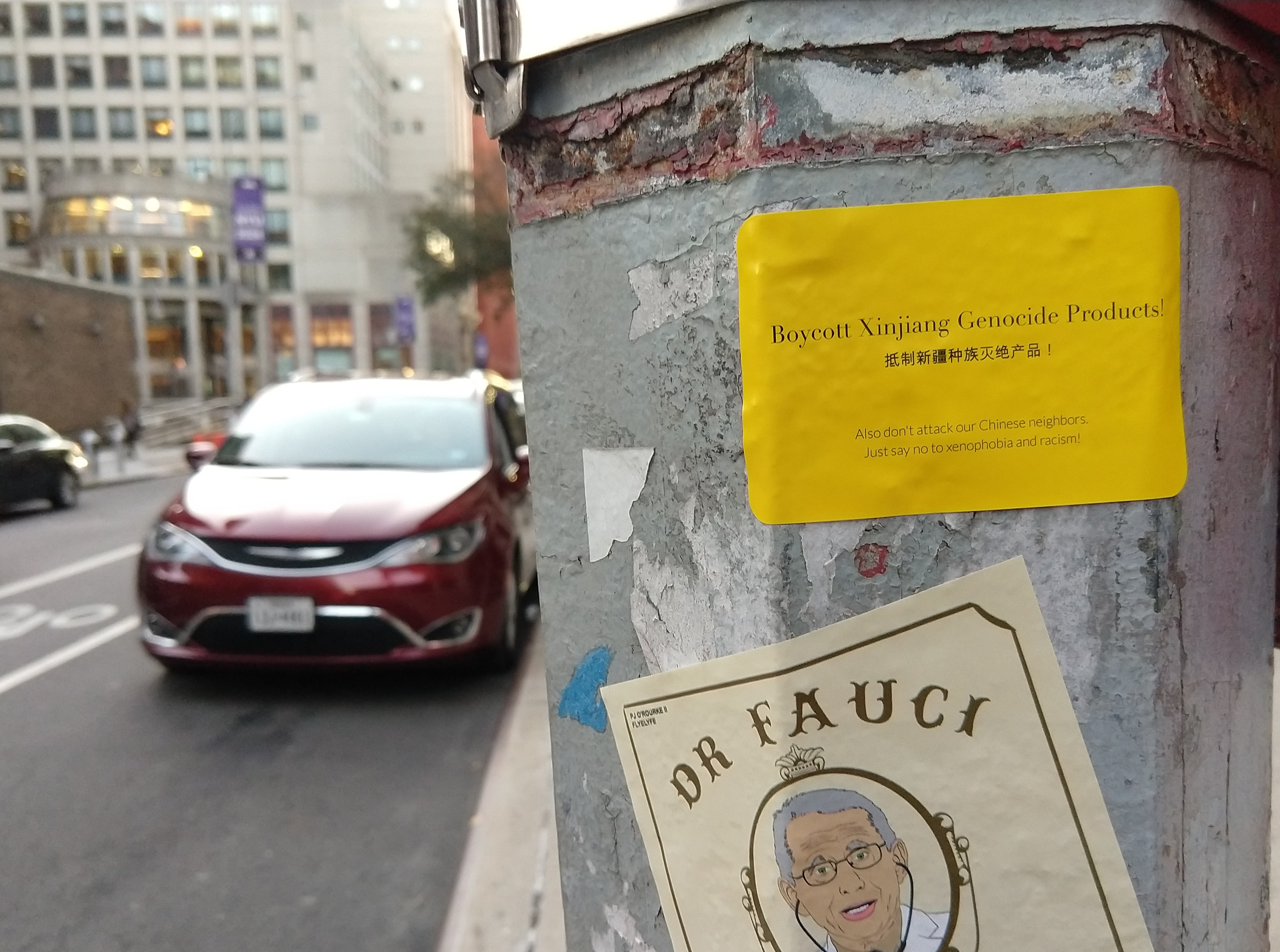
Call for boycott of products from China's Xinjiang province, New York, 2020. The US officially recognized the Chinese government's treatment of the Uyghurs in Xinjiang as a genocide.

In the area of human rights and international law, the U.S. has worked to put pressure on China internationally by drawing attention to its human rights record. In particular, U.S. policymakers have focused on the status of China's re-education camps for those accused of religious extremism in China's Xinjiang Uygur Autonomous Region, the region inhabited by the Muslim Uyghur minority, as well as the protests in Hong Kong. These camps, which some NGOs such as the Washington-based Victims of Communism Memorial Foundation and East Turkistan National Awakening Movement estimated to have a population of over one million people, have been described as "indoctrination camps" that are reportedly run like prisons to eradicate Uyghur culture and religion in an attempt at Sinicization. The United States Congress has responded to these reports with calls for the imposition of sanctions under the Global Magnitsky Human Rights Accountability Act; in December 2019, the House of Representatives and Senate passed the Uighur Human Rights Policy Act.

==== Hong Kong ====
U.S. policy toward Hong Kong had been governed by the United States-Hong Kong Policy Act which said that the U.S. would continue to treat Hong Kong apart from the People's Republic of China even after the 1997 transfer of sovereignty. This changed drastically in 2020 when the U.S. passed the Hong Kong Autonomy Act and Executive Order 13936 in response to the 2019–2020 Hong Kong protests and imposition of the Hong Kong national security law by the Standing Committee of the National People's Congress of China. Under EO13936, the U.S. government has no longer treated Hong Kong as separate from China.

=== Economic strategy ===
With China entering the World Trade Organization in 2001 with approval from the US, China and the world economy benefited from globalization and the access to new markets and the increased trade that resulted. Despite this, some in the United States lament letting China in the WTO because part of the motivation to do so, the political liberalization of the PRC's government along the lines of the Washington Consensus never materialized. The US hoped economic liberalization would eventually lead to political liberalization to a government more akin to the then recently repatriated Hong Kong Special Administrative Region under "One country, two systems."

==== Trans-Pacific Partnership ====
In part, the Trans-Pacific Partnership (TPP), geopolitically was thought by some to likely bring China's neighbors closer to the United States and reduce its economic leverage and dependence on Chinese trade. If ratified, the TPP would have strengthened American influence on future rules for the global economy. US Secretary of Defense Ash Carter claimed the passage of the TPP to be as valuable to the United States as the creation of another aircraft carrier. President Barack Obama has argued "if we don't pass this agreement—if America doesn't write those rules—then countries like China will". However, on January 23, 2017, the newly elected President Donald Trump formally withdrew the United States from the Trans-Pacific Partnership.

==== Trade War ====
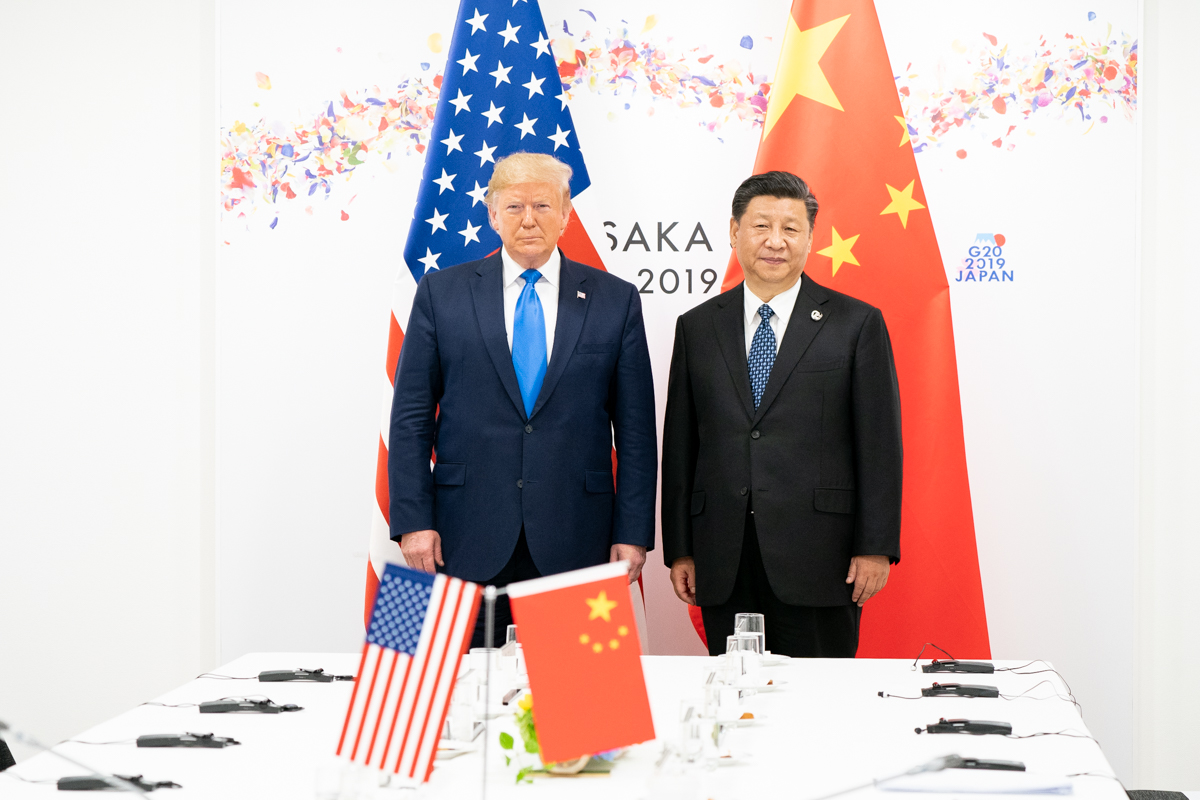
U.S. President Donald Trump and Chinese leader Xi Jinping at the G20 summit in Osaka, June 2019

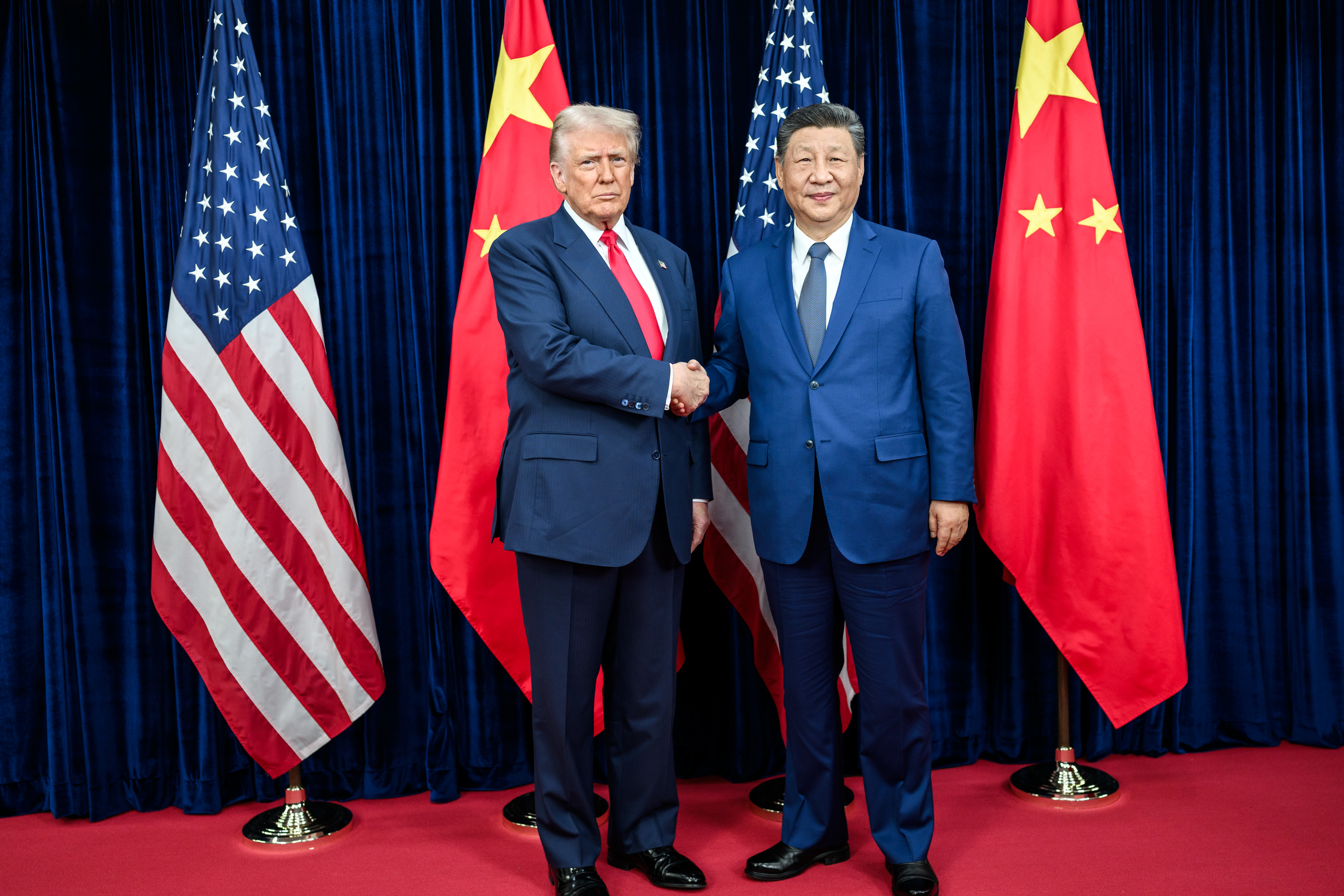
U.S. President Donald Trump and Chinese leader Xi Jinping at the APEC summit in Busan, October 2025

In what would become the China–United States trade war, President Donald Trump began setting tariffs and other trade barriers on China in 2018 with the goal of forcing it to make changes to what the U.S. says are "unfair trade practices". The US says those trade practices and their effects are the growing trade deficit, the theft of intellectual property and the forced transfer of American technology to China. Jeff Spross, an economics and business correspondent at TheWeek.com, commented that China is pursuing economic development much in the same way as many other modern industrialized economies before it, except in a world where the rules of the global free trade order are enforced by institutions like the World Bank, the International Monetary Fund, and the World Trade Organization, ensuring economic development is driven by private investors.

At the Bretton Woods Conference, the US representative, Harry Dexter White, insisted that the world reserve currency be the United States dollar instead of a proposed new international unit of currency and that the IMF and World Bank be under the purview of the United States. The Reagan administration and US Trade Representative Robert Lighthizer, and Donald Trump as a private citizen, made identical claims in the 1980s when Japan was undergoing its economic miracle which led Japan to signing the Plaza Accord. Like the TPP, it has been argued that the trade war is simply a more direct attempt to stifle China's development and is indicative of a shift in the US public perception of China as a "rival nation to be contained and beaten" among the two major political parties in Congress, the general public and even the business sector. It has been argued however that employing the Cold War playbook for the seemingly destined-to-fail Soviet Union, a state-run and largely closed economy will not work in the case of China because of its sheer size, growing wealth and vibrant economy. To halt development progress, particularly the Made in China 2025 plan, the US has responded by making it harder for Chinese tech companies from obtaining US technologies by investing in or acquiring US tech companies, and even attempting to stifle specific companies, namely Huawei, ZTE and ByteDance, from doing business domestically and abroad allegedly due to unspecified or speculative national security risks. With senior Trump administration officials such as John Bolton, Peter Navarro and Robert Lighthizer demanding any comprehensive trade deal feature "structural changes" which would essentially entail China surrendering its sovereignty over its economic system and planning (its Made in China 2025 industrial plan) and permanently ceding technology leadership to the US-an untenable situation to the Chinese- some see trade tensions continuing long into the future.

In the face of the US tariffs in the trade war and the sanctions on Russia following the annexation of Crimea, China and Russia have cultivated closer economic ties as well as security and defense cooperation to offset the losses.

==== Belt and Road Initiative ====
Another high-profile debate among some people in the United States and China on the international stage is the observation about China's growing geopolitical footprint in "soft power diplomacy" and international development finance. Particularly, this surrounds China's Belt and Road Initiative (formerly "One Belt, One Road"), which U.S. officials have labeled as "aggressive" and "debt trap diplomacy".

==== Indo-Pacific Economic Framework ====
The Biden administration and major regional economies such as India and Japan have participated in the Indo-Pacific Economic Framework to varying degrees, which is seen as a way to increase ties between friendly countries economically.

== Bilateral relationships ==
=== Australia ===
Starting in 2012, US marines began deploying to Australia on a rotational basis. In 2017, Australia rejoined the Quadrilateral Security Dialogue after leaving the strategic grouping in 2008 and in 2021, it became a member of AUKUS.

=== India ===
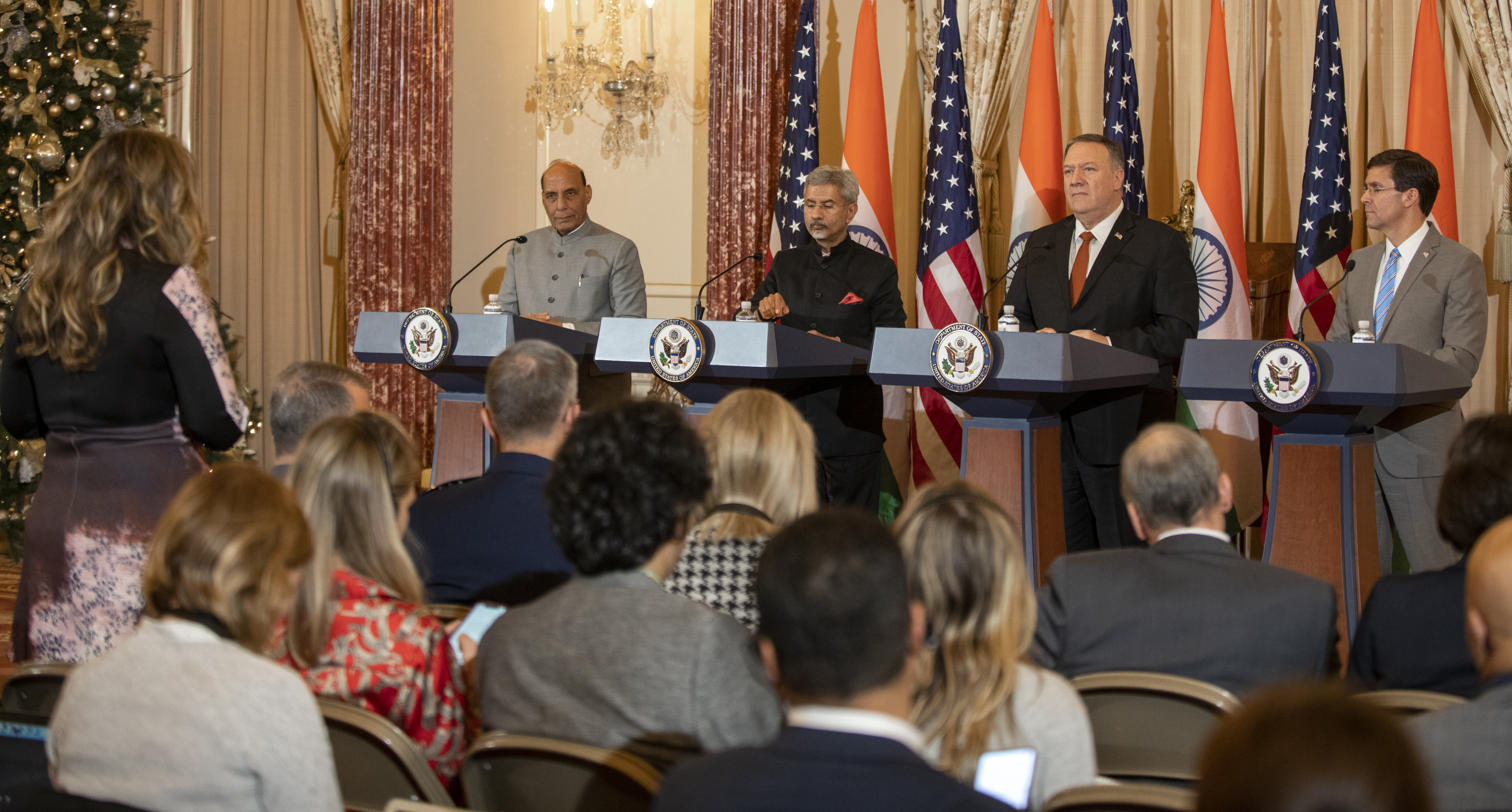
Secretary of State Michael Pompeo and Secretary of Defense Mark Esper hold a joint press availability with Indian Minister of External Affairs S. Jaishankar and Minister of Defence Rajnath Singh after the 2+2 Ministerial Dialogue

Against the backdrop of the ongoing border dispute between India and the People's Republic of China, the United States and India signed the Basic Exchange and Cooperation Agreement in October 2020 which enabled greater information-sharing and facilitated defense cooperation. In December 2022, based on BECA, the United States provided real-time location information of the PLA soldiers to help India rout China, during a confrontation in Arunachal Pradesh. As with Australia, Japan and the United States, India is a member of the Quadrilateral Security Dialogue.

India's relationship with Russia has emerged as an impediment to the US in forming a fully-developed united front with India against China. Policymakers in New Delhi see maintaining ties with Moscow as a way to limit China's influence over Russia and thwart any coordinated action the two might take against India.

=== Japan ===
As treaty allies, both Japan and the United States have deepened their security alliance since the late 1990s in response to the rise of China which has emerged as a top geopolitical threat to both countries. In 2018, members of the Amphibious Rapid Deployment Brigade held joint exercises with American marines and in 2023, Japan approved an American plan to station a new marine unit in Okinawa. As with Australia, India and the United States, Japan is a member of the Quadrilateral Security Dialogue.

=== Philippines ===
The Philippines and the United States are treaty allies and their security alliance has deepened in light of the ongoing territorial dispute between the Philippines and the People's Republic of China in the South China Sea. In 2014, both countries signed the Enhanced Defense Cooperation Agreement which allows the United States to rotate troops into the Philippines for extended stays and allows the United States to build and operate facilities on Philippine bases for both American and Philippine forces.

=== South Korea ===
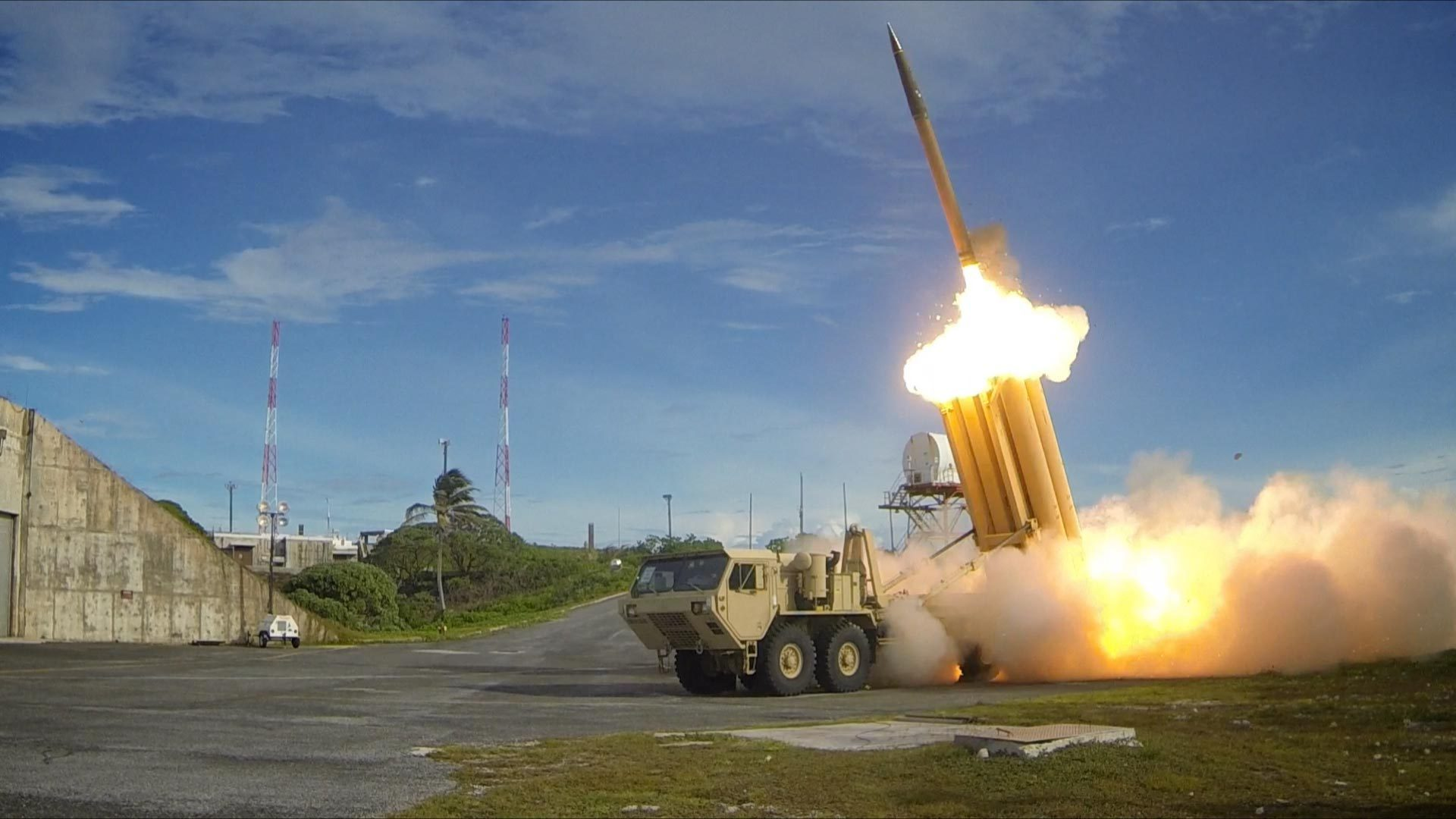
THAAD missile system

In accordance with the ROK–U.S. Mutual Defense Treaty, the U.S. has maintained a military presence in the South since the end of the Korean War. In late 2016, the United States and South Korea jointly announced the deployment of the Terminal High-Altitude Area Defense (THAAD) in response to nuclear and missile threats by North Korea. South Korea's decision to host the weapon system on its territory led to a significant deterioration in relations between South Korea and China, which viewed the deployment as a threat to its security.

=== Taiwan (ROC) ===
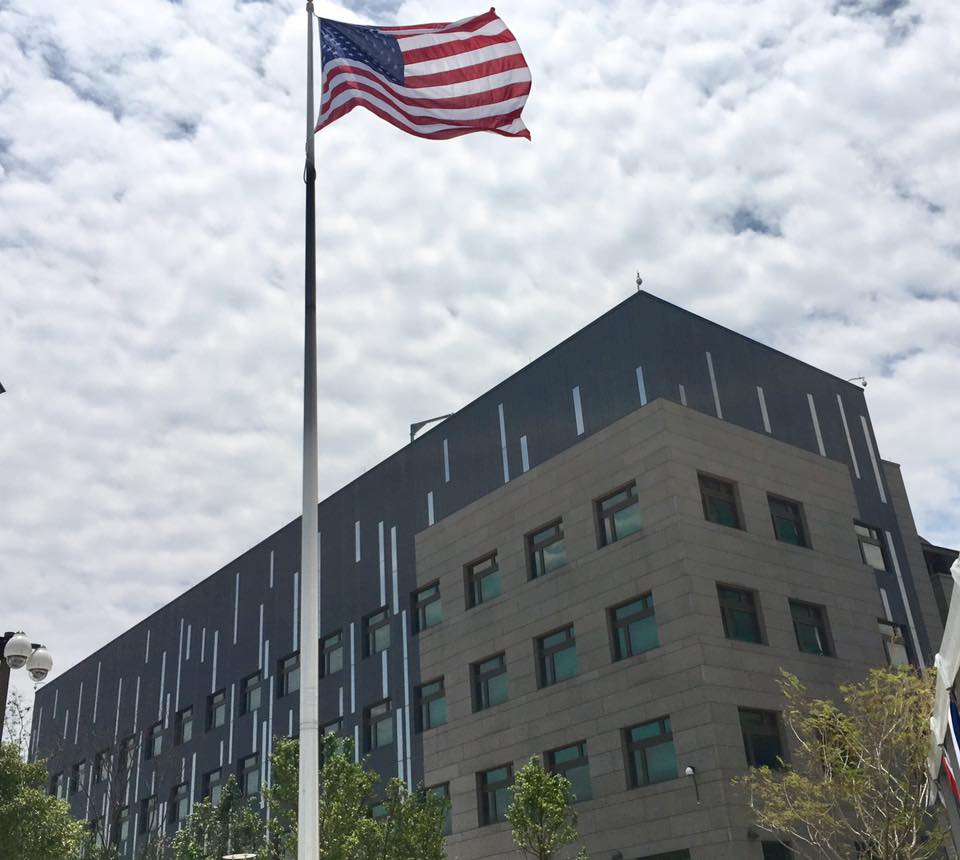
Taipei Main Office of the American Institute in Taiwan, with the flag of the United States flown out front.

While the United States has had formal relations with the PRC government which was recognized as the sole legitimate representative of China in 1979, it has simultaneously maintained unofficial relations with Taiwan over which, it emphasizes that it does not take any official position regarding sovereignty over Taiwan. The US only “acknowledges” but does not “endorse” PRC's position over Taiwan, and has considered Taiwan's political status as “undetermined”.

The position of the United States, as clarified in the China/Taiwan: Evolution of the "One China" Policy report of the Congressional Research Service (date: 9 July 2007) is summed up in five points:

1. The United States did not explicitly state the sovereign status of Taiwan in the three US-PRC Joint Communiqués of 1972, 1979, and 1982.
2. The United States "acknowledged" the "One China" position of both sides of the Taiwan Strait.
3. U.S. policy has not recognized the PRC's sovereignty over Taiwan;
4. U.S. policy has not recognized Taiwan as a sovereign country; and
5. U.S. policy has considered Taiwan's status as unsettled.

These positions remained unchanged in a 2013 report of the Congressional Research Service.

The US has consistently held to its version of One China policy and has stated that in regards to Cross-Strait relations;

We oppose any unilateral changes to the status quo from either side; we do not support Taiwan independence; and we expect cross-Strait differences to be resolved by peaceful means. We continue to have an abiding interest in peace and stability across the Taiwan Strait.

- US Department of State

A cornerstone in the bilateral relationship is the Taiwan Relations Act through which the United States has maintained its policy of strategic ambiguity. Prior to the normalization of diplomatic ties with the PRC, the US was a treaty ally of Taiwan under the Sino-American Mutual Defense Treaty. The treaty essentially prevented the People's Liberation Army from taking over the island of Taiwan, prolonged and assisted the Republic of China in maintaining legitimacy as the sole government of the whole of mainland China until the early 1970s and also helped US policymakers to shape the policy of containment in East Asia together with South Korea and Japan against the spread of communism.

The recent decade has seen an increasing frequency of US arms sales to Taiwan alongside expanding commercial ties. On December 16, 2015, the Obama administration announced a deal to sell $1.83 billion worth of arms to the Armed Forces of Taiwan, a year and eight months after U.S. Congress passed the Taiwan Relations Act Affirmation and Naval Vessel Transfer Act of 2014 to allow the sale of Oliver Hazard Perry-class frigates to Taiwan. The deal would include the sale of two decommissioned U.S. Navy frigates, anti-tank missiles, Assault Amphibious Vehicles, and FIM-92 Stinger surface-to-air missiles, amid the territorial disputes in the South China Sea.

A new $250 million compound for the American Institute in Taiwan was unveiled in June 2018, accompanied by a "low-key" American delegation. The Chinese authorities denounced this action as violation of the "one China" policy statement and demanded the US to stop all relations with Taiwan without intercession of China. In 2019, the US approved the sale of 108 M1A2 Abrams tanks and 250 Stinger missiles for $2.2 billion and 66 F-16V fighter jets for $8 billion. With the sale, China vowed to sanction any companies involved in the transactions. In May 2020, the U.S. Department of State approved a possible Foreign Military Sales of 18 MK-48 Mod 6 Advanced Technology heavy weight torpedoes for Taiwan in a deal estimated to cost $180 million.

== Multilateral relationships ==
=== US–Japan–Australia ===
Then-U.S. secretary of state Condoleezza Rice visited Australia in March 2006 for the "trilateral security forum" with the Japanese foreign minister Taro Aso and his Australian counterpart Alexander Downer.

=== US–Japan–Australia–India (the "Quad") ===
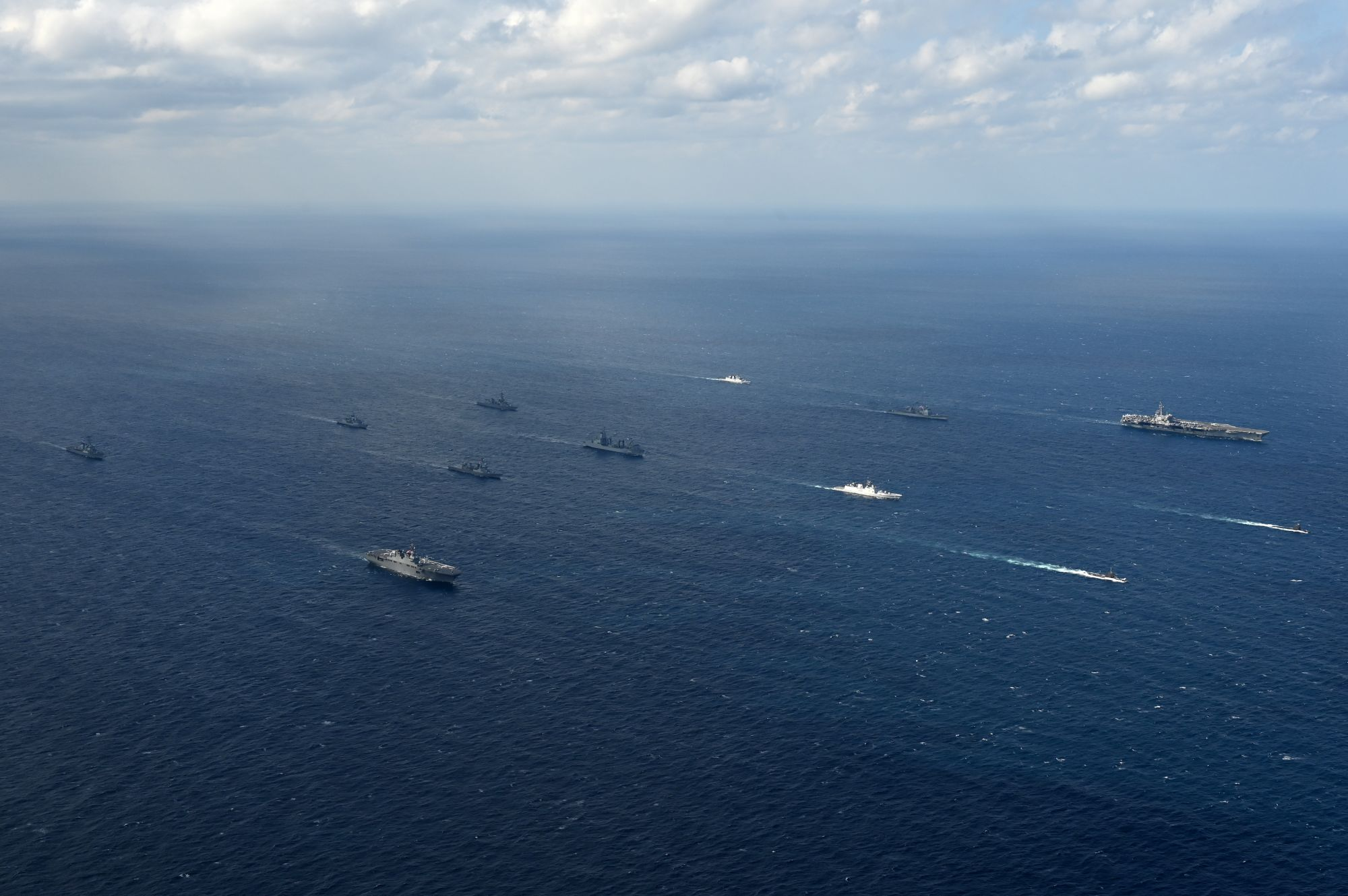
Malabar exercise in 2022

In May 2007, the four nations signed a strategic military partnership agreement, the Quadrilateral Security Dialogue. In 2017, with the support of then Japanese Prime Minister Shinzo Abe and Indian Prime Minister Narendra Modi, the United States restarted the "Quad".

=== US–Japan–India ===
The three nations held their first trilateral meeting in December 2011.

== Chinese response ==
The People's Republic of China officially opposes using the term "competition" to define relations between it and the United States. Chinese leader Xi Jinping claimed “Western countries led by the United States have contained and suppressed us in an all-round way, which has brought unprecedented severe challenges to our development”. In August 2022, U.S. politician Nancy Pelosi, serving as the Speaker of the U.S. House of Representatives, visited Taiwan for the first time in 25 years. China announced plans for live-fire military drills soon after her visit.

On 3 July 2023, at the 2023 International Forum for Trilateral Cooperation in Qingdao, China's chief diplomat Wang Yi said it was important for the two countries to "remember their roots" during a speech towards the participating Japanese and South Korean audience, where he called for Japan and South Korea to work together with China to "prosper together, revitalize East Asia, revitalize Asia and benefit the world" by controversially stating that "most Americans and Europeans can't tell China, Japan and South Korea apart" and that "no matter how blonde you dye your hair, how sharp you shape your nose, you can never become a European or American, you can never become a Westerner" before further adding they must know where their "roots lie." Some scholars criticized Wang's speech to be racist, as it appeared to overtly endorse the notion of actively supporting and advocating for the establishment of a race-based alliance among East Asians in East Asia. Geopolitical scholars in the academic community drew parallels between Wang's acerbic political rhetoric, which was implicitly marked by pronounced racial undertones, owing to its reminiscent resemblance and resonating traits of Imperial Japan's conceptualization of the Greater East Asia Co-Prosperity Sphere during the earlier part of the 20th century.

== See also ==
- China–United States relations
