= Island chain strategy =

Concept in United States foreign policy

The island chain strategy is a strategic maritime containment plan first conceived by American foreign policy statesman John Foster Dulles in 1951, during the Korean War. It proposed surrounding the Soviet Union and China with naval bases in the West Pacific to project power and restrict sea access.

The "island chain" concept did not become a major theme in American foreign policy during the Cold War, but after the dissolution of the Soviet Union it has remained a significant focus of both American and Chinese geopolitical and military analysts. For the United States, the island chain strategy is a significant part of the force projection of the U.S. military in the Far East. For the People's Republic of China (PRC), the concept is integral to its maritime security and fears of strategic encirclement by the U.S. and its allies. For both the U.S. and the PRC, the island chain strategy emphasizes the geographical and strategic importance of Taiwan.

== First island chain ==
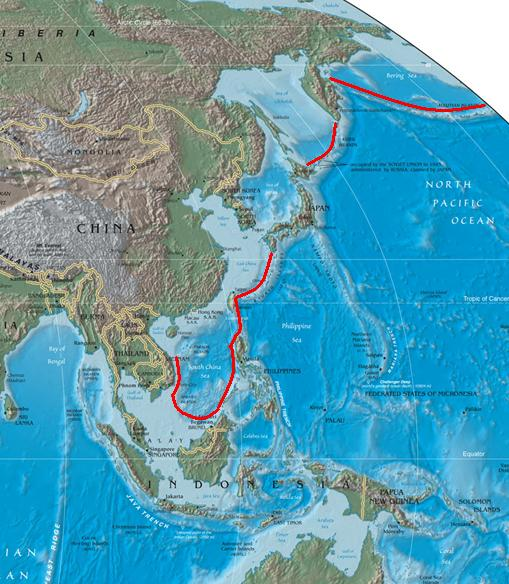
The first island chain perimeter (marked in red).

The first island chain is the first string of major Pacific archipelagos out from the East Asian continental mainland coast. It is principally composed of the Kuril Islands, the Japanese archipelago, the Ryukyu Islands, Taiwan (Formosa), the northern Philippines, and Borneo, extending all the way from the Kamchatka Peninsula in the northeast to the Malay Peninsula in the southwest.

The first island chain is one of three island chain doctrines within the island chain strategy of US foreign policy. It is considered a strategic military barrier to accessing the wider Pacific Ocean given the relative shallowness of waters to the west of the first island chain, which has important implications for submarine detection.

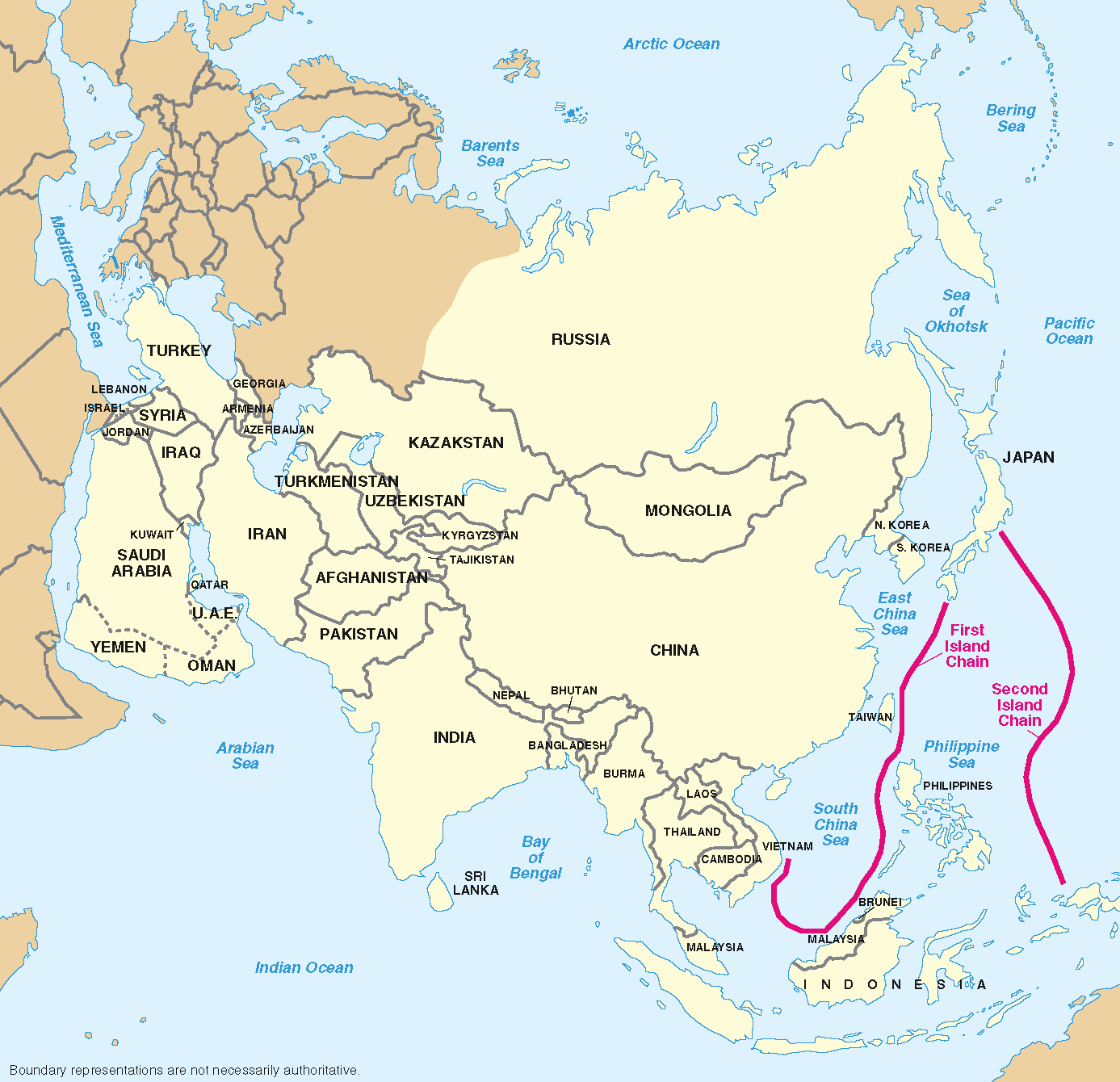
First and second island chains

Much of the first island chain is roughly situated in waters claimed by the People's Republic of China (PRC). These include the South China Sea, within the disputed nine-dash line, as well as the East China Sea west of the Okinawa Trough.

== Second island chain ==
The second island chain, also called the "second island cloud" by Earl Hancock Ellis, has two different interpretations, but the version most commonly used refers to the island chain which is formed by Japan's Bonin Islands and Volcano Islands, in addition to the Mariana Islands (most notably Guam, an unincorporated American overseas territory with a heavily fortified military base), western Caroline Islands (Yap and Palau), and extends to Western New Guinea. The chain serves as the eastern maritime boundary of the Philippine Sea.

As it is located within the middle portion of the West Pacific, it acts as a second strategic defense line for the United States.

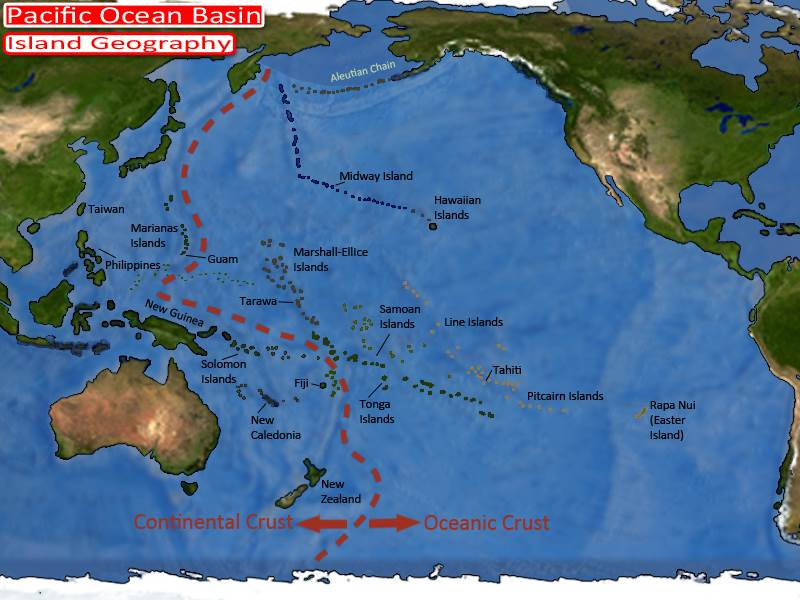
The second island chain encompasses the central northern part of the border to the Pacific Ocean basin, and the third island chain is part of the southern continuation of the border.

== Third island chain ==
The third island chain is the final part of the strategy. This island chain begins at the Aleutian Islands and runs south across the center of the Pacific Ocean towards Oceania, through the Hawaiian Islands, American Samoa, and Fiji, to reach New Zealand. Australia serves as the staple between the second and third chains.

== Proposed fourth and fifth island chains ==
The Asia Maritime Transparency Initiative, a group under the Center for Strategic and International Studies, argues that a fourth and a fifth island chain should be added to an overall understanding of Chinese maritime strategy in the Indo-Pacific. Whereas the first three island chains are located in the Pacific Ocean, these two newly proposed ones are in the Indian Ocean, which would reflect the growing Chinese interest in the region.

The proposed fourth chain would include places like Lakshadweep, the Maldives and Diego Garcia to disrupt the String of Pearls waypoints towards the Persian Gulf such as the Gwadar Port and Hambantota; while the proposed fifth chain would originate from Camp Lemonnier in the Gulf of Aden, around the Horn of Africa and along the entire East African coastline through the Mozambique Channel (between Mozambique and Madagascar, including the Comoro Islands) towards South Africa, to encircle the Chinese naval base at Doraleh, Djibouti and sabotage China's trade with Africa.

== Target and events ==
The primary target of the doctrine was originally the largest communist country, the Soviet Union. However, additional targets also included the other communist countries like the China, Laos, Vietnam, and North Korea. After the dissolution of the Soviet Union in 1991 and China's economic prominence in the early 21st century, China became the major target of the doctrine.

== See also ==
- Bamboo Curtain
- Rimland
- United States foreign policy toward the People's Republic of China
