= Blue Team (U.S. politics) =

American anti–People's Republic of China political lobby

The Blue Team is an informal term for a group of politicians and journalists in the United States loosely united by their belief that the People's Republic of China is a significant security threat to the United States. Though allied on some issues with Democratic advocates of labor, most of those to whom the term has been applied are conservative or neoconservative.

== Origin and application of the term ==
The name comes from the color representing US forces in war games, in contrast to the red that represents the American opponent. It was coined by William Triplett, former counsel to the Senate Foreign Relations Committee. After the Tiananmen Square protests of 1989, and in the context of China's economic and military expansion not only in Asia but around the world, "blue" concerns widened in scope.

Though now applied primarily to Republicans, the terms refers to concerns not tied to a single party or perspective. Bill Clinton campaigned in 1992 against George H. W. Bush's supposed laxness toward China, but while in office uncoupled economic integration with democratic reform in China.

== Individuals associated with the interpretation ==
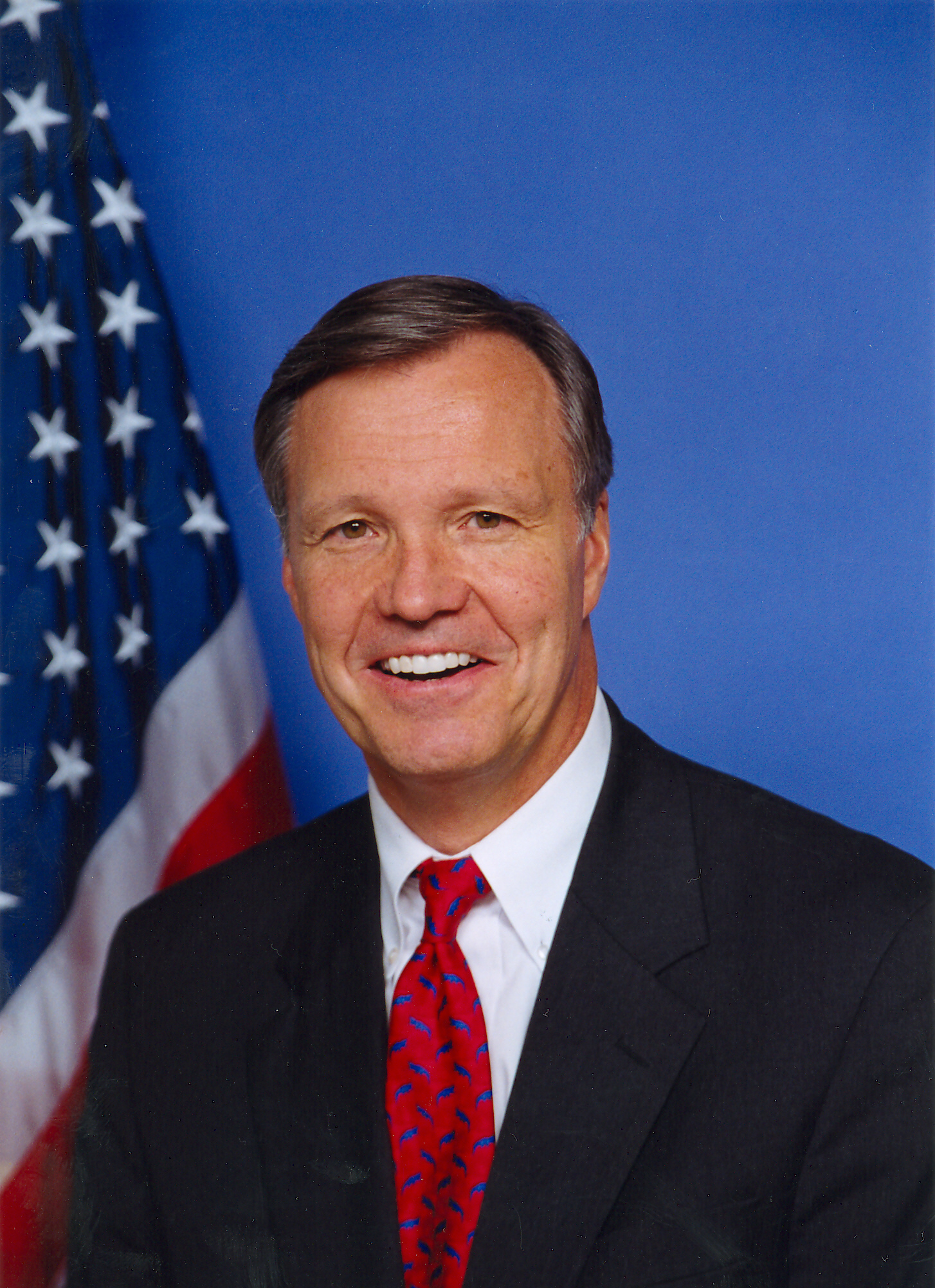
Christopher Cox is a semi-prominent American politician who is considered a member of the Blue Team.

The original core of the "blue team" was a group of congressional aides who met in an informal study group during the 1990s. Working largely behind the scenes, these aides influenced legislation in subtle and incremental ways. They were involved in attaching to bills riders that forced the State Department to report on human rights abuses and the Defense Department to reveal information it had collected about the Chinese military.

By and large, most high-profile American politicians have not spoken out stridently enough against China to be called members of the Blue Team. Some minor politicians have been closely associated with the group or its ideas. Among them are Christopher Cox, chairman of the commission that produced the Cox Report on Chinese espionage.

The Bush administration had for the most part followed the "pragmatic" approach that has been dominant in US foreign relations since the Shanghai Communiqué, which allows for "engagement" with China. However, more than the Clinton administration, it had been willing to see China as a strategic competitor, and it has been "far more eager...to treat China with suspicion and adopt more hard-nosed policies."

Still, the dominant voices of the "team" since 2001 have come not from government but from private conservative think tanks and journalists. William Kristol, whose The Weekly Standard once described the PRC as "a regime of hair-curling, systematic barbarity," has called repeatedly for a harsher stance against China. Robert Kagan, co-founder of PNAC. Ross H. Munro, and David Blumenthal, and Peter Navarro have all written extensively about the perceived threat posed by China. Navarro's 2011 book with Greg Autry, Death by China, inspired a 2012 documentary film of the same name directed by Navarro and narrated by Martin Sheen.

== Beliefs ==
The beliefs associated with "Blue Team" opinions arise largely from dissatisfaction with the general drift of American foreign policy toward accommodation with the PRC. The massacre in Tiananmen Square and China's later use of a missile test in an attempt to influence Taiwanese voters sharpened fears about China's intentions; The more virulent critics of China accused Clinton of appeasement.

For some, China's military is the focal point of concern, as it was for the original congressional study group. They point out that China is not only modernizing its army and navy, but it is also hiding its actual military expenditures. They claim that China aspires to dominate the region through, for example, the creation of a blue-water navy, and that such dominance would inevitably endanger US interests and threaten long-time allies Japan, South Korea, and Taiwan.

== Influence ==
As the Soviet Union collapsed and Russia's economy and military were still in turmoil, it seemed to some observers logical that China would seek to replace Russia as the main counterbalance to the United States. The "blue" perspective views with alarm China's increased military spending and the passing of the Taiwan anti-secession law in 2005. This was of major concern to US Defense Secretary Donald Rumsfeld since the Pentagon had frequently complained about the lack of transparency in China's military capabilities and intentions. A recent threat report from the Pentagon reinforced the Blue Team's fears, stating that China may be attempting a military buildup aimed at capturing Taiwan and deterring outside help from the US and/or Japan. Finally, though US policy towards North Korea has depended partly on China's cooperation, some "hawks" in the US suspect China's motives with regards to that country as well.

== See also ==
- Post–Cold War era
- China containment policy
- China Hands
- China Lobby
- China–United States relations
- Quadrilateral Security Dialogue
- Pan-Blue Coalition
- Pro–Republic of China sentiment

== Bibliography ==
- (2003). "A Bush Policy Worth Waiting For?" South China Daily Post. May 29.
- Buszynski, Leszek (2004). Asia Pacific Security: Values and Identity. London: Routledge.
- Feffer, John (2003). North Korea, South Korea: U.S. Policy at a Time of Crisis. Toronto: Hushion House.
- Friedman, Edward (2002). "Reflecting Mirrors across the Taiwan Straits: American Perspectives on a China Threat." The China Threat: Perceptions, Myths and Reality. Herbert Yee and Ian Storey, eds. London: Routledge.
- Gertz, Bill (2002). The China Threat. Washington, DC: Regnery Publishing.
- Gries, Peter Hays (2004). China's New Nationalism: Pride, Politics, and Diplomacy. Berkeley: University of California Press.
- Gurtov, Mel and Peter Van Ness (2004). Confronting the Bush Doctrine: Critical Views from the Asia-Pacific. London: Routledge.
- Ikenberry, G. J. and Michael Mastanduno (2003). International Relations Theory and the Asia-Pacific. New York: Columbia University Press.
- Jensen, Lionel and Timothy Weston (2007). China's Transformations: The Stories Beyond the Headlines. Lanham, MD: Rowman and Littlefield.
- Kaiser, Robert and Steven Mufson (2000). The Washington Post. February 22.
- Rice, Condoleezza (2000). "Campaign 2000: Promoting the National Interest." Foreign Affairs. Jan/Feb 2000.
- Scobell, Andrew (2002). "Crouching Korea, Hidden China: Bush Administration Policy toward Pyongyang and Beijing." Asia Survey 42 (2002).
- Timperlake, Edward (1998). Year of the Rat. Washington: Regnery Press.
