= The Coming China Wars =

Book by Peter Navarro

The Coming China Wars: Where They Will Be Fought, How They Can Be Won
- Author: Peter Navarro
- Language: English
- Subject: Economics
- Genre: Non-fiction
- Publisher: FT Press
- Publication date: October 2006
- Publication place: United States
- Media type: Hardback
- ISBN: 0-13-228128-7
- OCLC: 68192467
- Dewey Decimal: 337.51 22
- LC Class: HF1604 .N38 2007

The Coming China Wars: Where They Will Be Fought, How They Can Be Won is a book by Peter Navarro published by FT Press in (2006). Navarro examines China as an emerging world power confronting challenges at home and abroad as it struggles to exert itself in the global market. He also investigates how China's role in international commerce is creating conflicts with nations around the world over energy, natural resources, the environment, intellectual property, and other issues.

== Reception ==
In Politico's description of the book, "Navarro uses military language to refer to China's trade policies, referring to its 'conquest' of the world's export markets, which has 'vaporized literally millions of manufacturing jobs and driven down wages.' ... China's aspirations are so insatiable, he claims, that eventually there will be a clash over 'our most basic of all needs — bread, water, and air.'"
