= Greg Autry =

American space policy expert, author

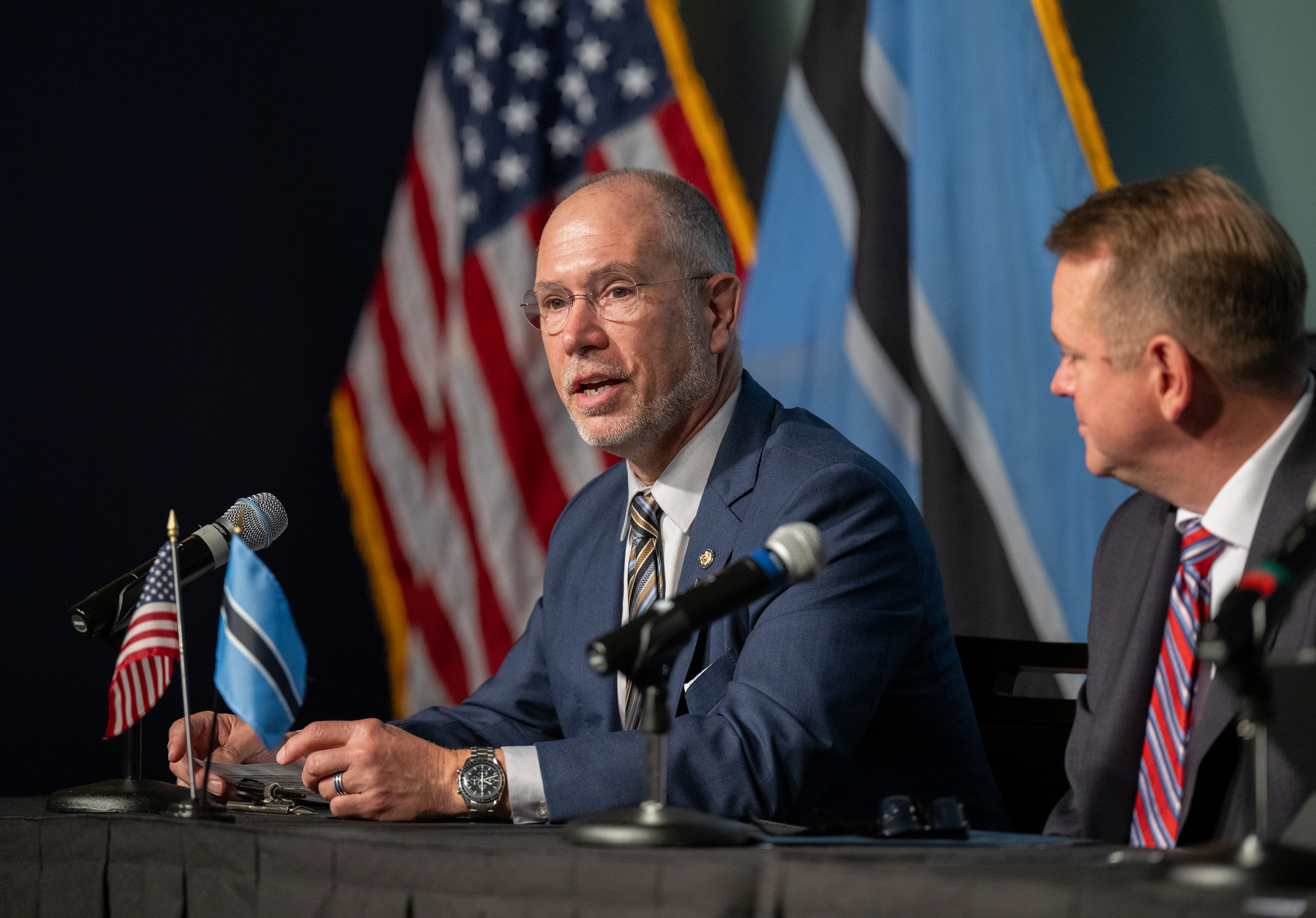
- Greg Autry at an Artemis Accords signing ceremony, June 2026.
- Born: Gregory Willard Autry; April 25, 1963 (age 63); Torrance, California, US
- Education: California State Polytechnic University, Pomona (BA); University of California, Irvine (MBA, PhD)
- Occupations: Entrepreneur; educator; space policy expert; author
- Notable work: Death by China
- Scientific career
- Fields: Organization theory; Economics
- Thesis: Exploring new space: governmental roles in the emergence of new communities of high-technology organizations (2013)

Greg Autry (born April 25, 1963) is an American space policy expert, educator, entrepreneur, and author. He is Senior Advisor for Space in the Bureau of Oceans and International Environmental and Scientific Affairs at the United States Department of State. He is also Professor of Practice in the College of Business and Associate Provost for Space Commercialization and Strategy at the University of Central Florida. Autry has held academic positions at Arizona State University, the University of Southern California, and the University of California, Irvine, and has served in advisory and temporary government roles related to space policy, including at NASA.

== Education ==
Autry received a BA in history from California State Polytechnic University, Pomona in 1999, an MBA from the Paul Merage School of Business at the University of California, Irvine in 2002, and a PhD in management from the University of California, Irvine in 2013. Autry's doctoral dissertation focused on the role of government in the emergence of new industries, using the emerging NewSpace or "commercial spaceflight" sector as a research context. Autry collected data from interviews with commercial space actors as well as information from industry journals and presentations at industry conferences. His analysis combined management, sociological, and policy models.

== Career ==
=== Software and network engineer ===
While in high school, Autry co-founded H.A.L. Labs with Brian Fitzgerald in 1980. (The name is not related to the Japanese video game company HAL Laboratory.) The firm developed and published early video games for the Apple II. Its first title, Taxman, a Pac-Man-style game, was later licensed to Atari and released under the Atarisoft label.

During the 1980s Autry worked as a software developer. From 1983 to 1984 he wrote production software for Honeywell's Training and Control Systems Division in West Covina, California, supporting various military projects. From 1984 to 1986 he developed medical device software for Hemascience Laboratories (later part of Baxter Fenwal), including low-level assembly code for the Autopheresis C plasmapheresis machine and associated robotic manufacturing systems.

In 1987 he founded Riverside Doctor Micro, Inc., a computer services and retail company, with Daniel Haste. The business was sold to CompuCom Systems in 1994, after which Autry worked as Technical Services Manager responsible for branches in Los Angeles and Orange County. In 1997 he co-founded Network Corps, which specialized in network engineering and enterprise software, notably developing clinical systems for Kaiser Permanente. The company operated until 2014.

In 2015 Autry became involved with Elevated Materials, a startup focused on upcycling scrap carbon fiber from aerospace production.

=== Academic career ===
After earning his MBA from the University of California, Irvine, Autry taught as an adjunct lecturer at UCI from 2002 to 2014. His courses covered innovation, entrepreneurship, strategy, and macroeconomics. He also taught macroeconomics at Chapman University in 2013.

Autry joined the USC Marshall School of Business in 2013 as an adjunct professor and became a full-time assistant clinical professor of entrepreneurship the following year. He left USC in July 2020 after President Donald Trump nominated him to serve as chief financial officer of NASA.

In April 2021, he joined the Thunderbird School of Global Management at Arizona State University as Clinical Professor & Director of Space Leadership, Policy and Business Initiative. He contributed to the development of a space initiative at ASU’s downtown Los Angeles campus.

Autry joined the University of Central Florida in fall 2024 as professor of practice in the College of Business and associate provost for space commercialization and strategy. He also teaches space entrepreneurship in the Graduate Certificate Program in Commercial Space offered jointly by the International Space University and Florida Institute of Technology, and served as a visiting professor at the Institute for Security Science and Technology at Imperial College London from 2021 to 2025.

== Publications and media appearances ==
In 2011, Autry presented the paper "Space Policy, Intergenerational Ethics, and the Environment" at the American Institute of Aeronautics and Astronautics SPACE 2011 Conference & Exposition. In it, he argued that public investment in space technology is justified by anticipated long-term economic, societal, and environmental returns.

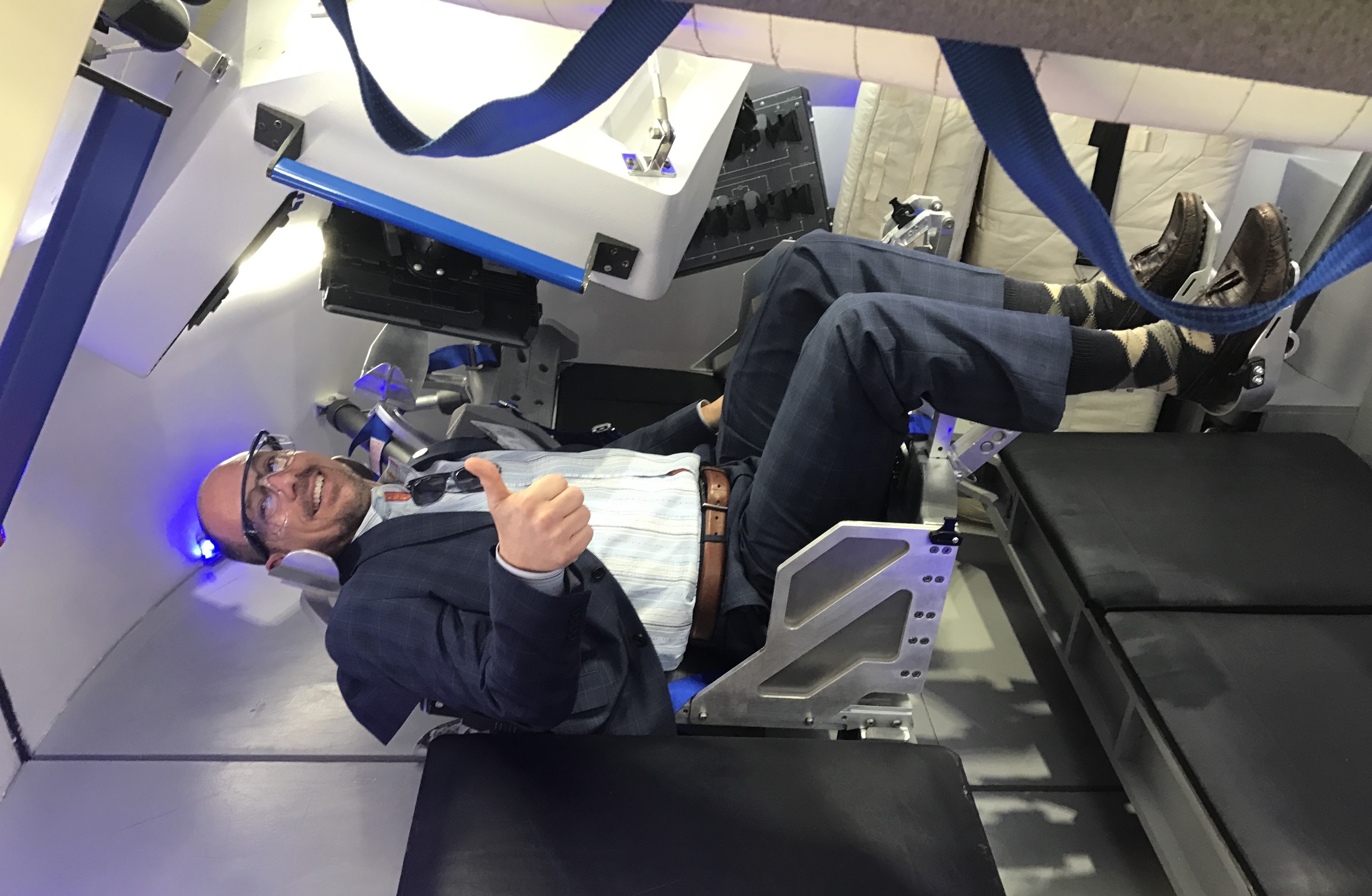
Autry in the Boeing CST-100 Starliner Capsule

That same year, he co-authored the book Death by China with Peter Navarro. Autry has criticized the Chinese Communist Party and the policies of the People's Republic of China for over a decade, accusing the Chinese government of violating human rights, labor standards, environmental norms, treaty obligations, and international trade agreements. In 2012, he served as a producer on the documentary film of the same name, directed by Navarro and narrated by Martin Sheen.

According to his personal website, his writing on commercial space development and U.S.–China relations has appeared in the San Francisco Chronicle, Los Angeles Times, Washington Times, Newsweek, Forbes, Foreign Policy, and SpaceNews. He has been quoted in The New York Times, The Wall Street Journal, Politico, and The Washington Post, and has appeared on television networks including the BBC and CNN.

Autry has advocated for sustained public investment in NASA programs and commercial space initiatives. He supports human settlement of the Solar System as necessary for long-term global economic growth and environmental sustainability, arguing that these objectives cannot be achieved through conventional environmental measures alone. He serves as vice president for Space Development at the National Space Society and previously served on its board of directors.

In January 2022, Autry published his college textbook The New Entrepreneurial Dynamic: 21st Century Startups and Small Businesses with FlatWorld. It introduces the New Entrepreneurial Dynamic (NED) as an adaptive model for business development that emphasizes flexibility, building dynamic teams, planning for change, and developing alternative strategies.

Autry has published articles in the peer-reviewed journal New Space and serves on its editorial board.

In April 2024, Autry and Navarro co-authored Red Moon Rising: How America Will Beat China on the Final Frontier. The book presents their view that the United States and China are engaged in a new Cold War, with competition on the Moon as a major component.

== Policy advocacy ==
Autry has testified before the United States Congress on two occasions regarding China-related issues. On March 28, 2012, he appeared before the House Foreign Affairs Subcommittee on Oversight and Investigations to discuss "The Price of Public Diplomacy with China". He warned of China's perception management campaign in the United States aimed at legitimizing its non-democratic system. The following year, on March 21, 2013, he testified before the House Foreign Affairs Subcommittee on Europe, Eurasia and Emerging Threats on "Cyber Attacks: An Unprecedented Threat to US National Security". In that testimony he described Chinese internet intrusions against U.S. firms as costing the American economy hundreds of billions of dollars and resulting in significant job losses. He compared the overall impact to the September 11 attacks and called for a ban on the import of Chinese networking hardware, specifically naming Huawei.

On November 10, 2020, Autry testified before the Senate Commerce, Science, and Transportation Committee at a nomination hearing. He argued that public investment in space was justified and reminded the committee that the Apollo landings had taken place during a time of war, civil unrest, and a major pandemic.

In February 2022, Autry participated in the Oxford Union Space Race Debate as a proponent of human habitation of Mars.

He is also a member of the Committee on the Present Danger: China.

== Governmental service and federal advisory roles ==
During the 2016–2017 presidential transition, Autry served on the Agency Review Team at NASA. These teams are tasked with evaluating government agencies and making policy recommendations to the incoming administration.

The team's recommendations formed the basis for the Trump administration's space policy, which included budget increases for NASA and a commitment to returning to the Moon. Following his service on the transition team, Autry temporarily served as the White House Liaison at NASA.

In 2018, Autry was appointed to the Commercial Space Transportation Advisory Committee (COMSTAC), which advises the Federal Aviation Administration’s Office of Commercial Space Transportation. He was reappointed in 2020 and served as Chair of the Safety Working Group until his term ended in 2022.

President Trump nominated Autry to serve as chief financial officer of NASA on July 27, 2020. On December 2, the Senate Commerce, Science, and Transportation Committee voted 14–12 along party lines to advance his nomination to the full Senate. His nomination was returned to the President on January 3, 2021, under Senate Rule XXXI, which calls for all nominations not yet voted by the time of the Senate's annual adjournment to be returned to the President.

In March 2022, he was appointed chair of the Business Case subcommittee for NASA’s In Space Production Applications (InSPA) program. In November 2023, he was appointed to the National Academies of Sciences, Engineering, and Medicine’s Committee on the Review of the Small Business Innovation Research and Small Business Technology Transfer Programs at NASA.

On March 24, 2025, Autry was again nominated for the position of Chief Financial Officer at NASA. His nomination again expired January 3, 2026. He declined a renomination, announcing that he would not pursue confirmation again.

In June 2026, Autry joined the United States Department of State as Senior Advisor for Space in the Bureau of Oceans and International Environmental and Scientific Affairs.

== Business and advisory roles ==
Autry has served as an advisor to Relativity Space, a launch vehicle manufacturer that uses additive manufacturing (3D printing). He began advising the company’s founders while they were students at the University of Southern California.

He served on the board of the National Space Society from 2018 to 2020 and continues to serve as vice president for Space Development.

He serves on the board of directors of Interstellar Lab.
