= White House National Trade Council =

American government body

National Trade Council

Agency overview
- Formed: January 20, 2017
- Dissolved: April 29, 2017
- Headquarters: Washington, D.C.
- Agency executive: Peter Navarro, Director
- Parent agency: Office of White House Policy

The National Trade Council (NTC) of the United States was the principal forum used by the president of the United States to advise on strategies in trade negotiations, coordinate with other agencies to assess U.S. manufacturing capabilities and the defense industrial base, and help match unemployed American workers with new opportunities in the skilled manufacturing sector. The council formed part of the Office of White House Policy which contains the National Economic Council and other offices.

== History ==
President-elect Donald Trump announced his intent to create the office on December 21, 2016, and named Peter Navarro as its inaugural director. In April 2017, the NTC was folded into the newly created Office of Trade and Manufacturing Policy; by September 2017, both the NTC and OTMP were reorganized again and placed under the National Economic Council by then White House chief of staff John Kelly. In February 2018 the OTMP (and by extension the NTC) regained independence. Although the National Trade Council was said to have still existed later into the Trump administration, its responsibilities and duties had largely been taken over by the Office of Trade and Manufacturing policy, rendering the Council effectively defunct.
