= Office of Trade and Manufacturing Policy =

US Executive Office

- OTMP

Agency overview
- Formed: April 29, 2017; January 20, 2025 (reinstated)
- Dissolved: January 20, 2021
- Headquarters: Washington, D.C., U.S.; 38°53′49″N 77°02′10″W
- Agency executive: Peter Navarro, Director
- Parent agency: Office of White House Policy

The Office of Trade and Manufacturing Policy (OTMP) is an office established within the White House Office by US president Donald Trump by presidential Executive Order 13797 on April 29, 2017. Its director during the first Trump administration was Peter Navarro.

The Biden administration did not staff the office, and it remained inactive from 2021 to 2025.

The office was restored for the Second Trump Administration.

== Mission and responsibilities ==
Full quotation of Sec. 2 (mission)

"The mission of the OTMP is to defend and serve American workers and domestic manufacturers while advising the President on policies to increase economic growth, decrease the trade deficit, and strengthen the United States manufacturing and defense industrial bases."

and of Sec. 3 (Responsibilities):

"The OTMP shall:

(a) advise the President on innovative strategies and promote trade policies consistent with the President's stated goals;
(b) serve as a liaison between the White House and the Department of Commerce and undertake trade-related special projects as requested by the President; and
(c) help improve the performance of the executive branch's domestic procurement and hiring policies, including through the implementation of the policies described in Executive Order 13788 of April 18, 2017 (Buy American and Hire American)."

=== COVID-19 pandemic ===
In March 2020, during the coronavirus pandemic, Trump signed Executive Order 13911, naming Peter Navarro as the Defense Production Act policy coordinator, and giving the OTMP authority to marshal federal resources as the US faced potential shortfalls in necessary hardware such as ventilators and personal protective equipment.

== Directors ==
Image	Officeholder	Term start	Term end	President
	Peter Navarro	April 29, 2017; January 20, 2025	January 20, 2021; Present	Donald Trump

== Reports ==
=== Trade ===
In May 2019, the OTMP published a report analyzing the potential economic impact of the United States Reciprocal Trade Act, a bill proposed in January 2019 that would enable the president to impose reciprocal tariffs on trade partners who do not lower corresponding tariffs or non-tariff barriers. The bill never advanced beyond Committee.

In August 2026, the OTMP published a report claiming over 40 US trading partners were using transshipment as a means of fraudulently evading paying tariffs on shipments originating from China. Its analysis concluded that such efforts affected between $40 billion and $75 billion in imported goods annually, resulting in between $19 billion and $26 billion in lost tariff revenues.

=== Manufacturing ===
In August 2020, the OTMP released a report giving an update on the status of the federal government's usage of the DPA. The report identified 78 instances of actions undertaken by the Trump administration to combat certain equipment shortages. This report faced criticism as later analysis showed several cited instances in the report were either executive orders unrelated to the production of medical equipment or Defense Department expenditures that did not directly address the nation's supply shortages, with some examples dating as far back as 2017. With Ohio senator Sherrod Brown labeling the report as “propaganda” and a “political stunt”.

In early October 2020, the OTMP released a report purportedly detailing the progress of the Trump administration's "Buy American, Hire American" policies as outlined in Executive Order 13788. The report covered five key areas: buying American procurement, hiring American labor, trade policy and tariffs, defense budget and policies, and utilization of the Jones Act.

=== Job creation ===
By late October 2020, the OTMP released a series of seven reports under the banner "All Job Creation Is Local", each report focused on a different state: Maine, Michigan, Minnesota, Pennsylvania, Wisconsin, North Carolina, and Florida. Each highlighted federal actions that could translate into job creation across various key sectors for the respective economies of each state. However, The Daily Beast noted these reports focused entirely on what were considered swing states in the upcoming 2020 United States presidential election and were viewed as an attempt to "sell the case for the president’s reelection".

=== National security ===
In July 2017, President Trump signed Executive Order 13806, on Assessing and Strengthening the Manufacturing and Defense Industrial Base and Supply Chain Resiliency of the United States, initiated by the OTMP, which directed the Department of Defense to lead a whole of government assessment of the health of the manufacturing and defense industrial base of the United States. The report was published in October, 2018.

In June 2018, the OTMP released a report outlining how China's policies threaten the economic and national security of the United States.

== See also ==
- List of executive actions by Donald Trump
- White House National Trade Council
