= Richard E. Caves =

American economist (1931–2019)

- Born: November 1, 1931; Akron, Ohio, U.S.
- Died: November 22, 2019 (aged 88)
- Education: Oberlin College (BA); Harvard University (MA, PhD)
- Scientific career
- Fields: Economics
- Institutions: Harvard University
- Thesis: Recent developments in general-equilibrium international trade theory (1958)
- Doctoral advisor: Gottfried Haberler
- Doctoral students: Michael Porter; Elhanan Helpman; Peter Navarro

Richard Earl Caves (November 1, 1931 – November 22, 2019) was an American economist and professor of economics at Harvard University. He is known for his work on multinational corporations, industrial organization and the creative industries. He is known within the film economics field as the author of a definitive book on the organization of creative industries.

== Education and career ==
Caves obtained his B.A. in economics at Oberlin College in 1953. He continued his studies at Harvard University, where he obtained his M.A. in economics in 1956, and his Ph.D. in 1958.

In 1957, Caves embarked on his academic career in the Department of Economics, chaired by Joe S. Bain, at the University of California, Berkeley. In 1962, he moved back to Harvard University, where he was appointed Professor of Economics and lectured in industrial organization and international trade. He served as department chairman from 1966 to 1969, and as Chairman of the Ph.D. programme in Business Economics from 1984 to 1997. He was also appointed as the George Gund Professor of Economics and Business Administration from 1986 to 1997, and subsequently as the Nathaniel Ropes Research Professor of Political Economy, from 1997 on. He retired from Harvard in 2003, and became emeritus Professor of Economics. He also sat on the editorial board of the Review of Economics and Statistics from 1992 to 1996.

== Consultancy work ==
Caves acted as a consultant on various topics to various bodies. He was an adviser on international monetary problems for the US Council of Economic Advisers in 1961, and deputy to the Special Assistant to the President on foreign trade policy in the same year. From 1963 to 1964 he was a member of the Review Committee for Balance of Payments Statistics at the US Bureau of the Budget (also known as the Bernstein Committee). In 1964, he was appointed as a member of the White House Task Force on Foreign Economic Policy. From 1972 to 1973, he acted as a consultant to the Council of Ontario Universities, and from 1975 to 1976 he was a consultant to the Royal Commission on Corporate Concentration.

== Contributions to Creative Industries ==
Caves specialized in industrial and political economics, and authored several books on industrial efficiency, productivity, and competition. Using this as background, Caves went on to provide new insights into the economics of the artistic and creative endeavour by examining the organization of creative industries. In a seminal work, Creative Industries: Contracts Between Art and Commerce, Caves examined a wide range of visual and performing arts – including cinema and television, theatre, music, book publishing, and toys and games – in order to investigate how the theory of contracts and the logic of economic organization affect the production of "simple creative goods" (like art), as well as more "complex goods" (such as theatre plays or motion pictures), which require teams of artists with diverse talents.

According to Caves' analysis, art collectors and moviegoers are consumers; gallery owners are "gatekeepers"; and critics are "certifiers." In this respect, his work comes close to that of the American sociologist, Howard S. Becker, who, two decades earlier, put forward a theory of art worlds. However his approach was strictly that of an economist, as he theorised that the organization and practices of all creative industries could be analysed according to seven "economic properties". These were: (1) time flies, the fact that all creative work is subject to tight deadlines and has to be completed by a particular date; (2) infinite variety, meaning that no two creative products are the same and, as a result, cannot be standardised; (3) nobody knows, referring to the vagaries of an uncertain market where success or failure of a creative product cannot be determined in advance; (4) A list / B list, a ranking of both organisations and individual personnel as a means to combat market uncertainties through recognised talent; (5) motley crew, whereby all creative products, to a greater or lesser extent, rely on cooperation among different personnel with different skill sets; (6) art for art's sake, meaning that creative products differ from other mass-produced commodities because they rely on aesthetic or artistic inputs; and (7) ars longa, referring to the cumulation of copyrights by film studios, publishing houses, and other creative industry organisations.

Over the years since its publication, the attention paid to Caves's work on creative industries has borne out the early comment by sociologist Paul DiMaggio that his book "promises to be a much-needed touchstone for work in cultural economics, the sociology of art and culture, and the interdisciplinary field of arts and cultural policy analysis." Scholars in economic geography, political science, anthropology, and cultural studies have all taken Caves's work as their starting point in their own analyses of different forms of creative industries – primarily in the United States and Europe, but also in the Asian region (in particular, perhaps, Japan).

== Awards and Prizes ==
- Wells Prize, Harvard University, 1957–8
- Ford Foundation Faculty Research Fellowship, 1959–60
- Gerard C. Henderson Prize, Harvard Law School, 1966
- Fellow, American Academy of Arts and Sciences, 1968
- Galbraith Prize, 1976, 1981
- Kenan Enterprise Award, 1990
- Doctor of Economic Science, University of London, 1999
- Eminent Scholar, Academy of International Business, 1999
- Distinguished Scholar Award, Academy of International Business, 1998
- Doctor of Economic Science, University of London, 1999
- Distinguished Fellow, Industrial Organization Society, 2001.

== Selected publications ==
- Caves, Richard E. Multinational enterprise and economic analysis. Cambridge University Press, 1996.
- Caves, Richard E. Creative industries: Contracts between art and commerce. Harvard University Press, 2000.
- Caves, Richard E. (1962). Air Transport and its Regulators. Cambridge, Massachusetts: Harvard University Press. LCCN 62017216.

Articles, a selection:

- Caves, Richard E. "International corporations: The industrial economics of foreign investment." Economica (1971): 1-27.
- Caves, Richard E. "Multinational firms, competition, and productivity in host-country markets." Economica (1974): 176–193.
- Caves, Richard E., and Michael E. Porter. "From entry barriers to mobility barriers: Conjectural decisions and contrived deterrence to new competition." The Quarterly Journal of Economics (1977): 241–261.
- Caves, Richard E. "Industrial organization and new findings on the turnover and mobility of firms." Journal of economic literature (1998): 1947–1982.
