= Death by China =

2011 book by Peter Navarro

- Author: Peter Navarro; Greg Autry
- Language: English
- Publisher: Pearson Prentice Hall
- Publication date: May 15, 2011
- Publication place: United States
- Media type: Hardcover
- Pages: 300
- ISBN: 978-0-13-218023-8

Death by China: Confronting the Dragon – A Global Call to Action is a 2011 non-fiction book by Peter Navarro and Greg Autry. It chronicles the alleged threats to America's economic dominance in the 21st century posed by China and the Chinese Communist Party, "from currency manipulation and abusive trade policies, to deadly consumer products". A feature-length documentary film based on the book, narrated by Martin Sheen and also titled Death by China, was released in 2012. The documentary was financed by Nucor steel corporation, and has been endorsed by Donald Trump.

== Themes and content ==
Navarro argues that China is a "heavily armed, totalitarian regime intent on regional hegemony and bent on global domination". He says China, which he frequently refers as "the Dragon" or "Dragonland", violates fair trade by "illegal export subsidies and currency manipulation, effectively flooding the U.S. markets" and unfairly making it "virtually impossible" for American companies to compete. It is a critique of "global capitalism" including foreign labor practices and environmental protection. The book's foreword was written by Tang Baiqiao, a student activist during the 1989 Tiananmen Square protests, now resident in the U.S. and a prominent supporter of President Donald Trump. Navarro describes the book as a "survival guide" to outmaneuver "the planet’s most efficient assassin" and warns the readers about buying Chinese products.

The book features illustrations explaining how China utilizes "eight pillars" to erode manufacturing jobs in the United States. These methods include providing export subsidies, manipulating and undervaluing currency, engaging in counterfeiting, piracy, and intellectual property theft, avoiding environmental regulations to enhance domestic production, enforcing minimal worker health and safety standards, imposing import tariffs and quotas, employing predatory pricing and tactics to eliminate foreign competitors, and adopting protectionist measures to block foreign companies from operating in China. The book cites a claim by Ron Vara, a fictitious Harvard economics student, "The Manufacturing Dragon is voracious. The Colonial Dragon is relentless. The American Eagle is asleep at the wheel", which was later discovered to be an invention of Navarro ("Ron Vara" being an anagram of Navarro's surname). In response, publisher Prentice Hall stated that a disclaimer will be added to future editions of the book.

== Reception ==
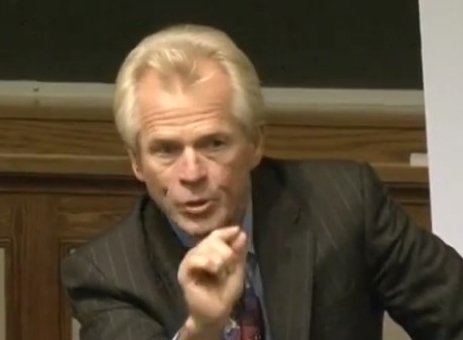
Navarro talks about his book Death by China at the University of Michigan in 2012.

In a 2011 review, Chriss Street of The Huffington Post described the book as "a muckraker's call to confront the dangers of America's dance with the Chinese dragon in the 21st century." In a 2012 article, Andrew O'Hehir of Salon commented that Navarro's "dramatic overkill is both unfortunate and unnecessary, because the questions Navarro asks about our deformed and dependent relationship with China are legitimate and troubling", and "[m]uch of the argument Navarro assembles in 'Death by China' is unassailable as to its basic facts, even if the tone and manner of presentation leave much to be desired." Similarly, Neil Genzlinger of The New York Times found that the "alarming and alarmist" film "undercuts its argument with an abundance of inflammatory language and cheesy graphics" and "is also unabashedly one-sided and is short on solutions" but added that "its message, despite the hyperbole, certainly warrants examination and discussion."

Reviewing the documentary in 2012, Sam Adams of the Los Angeles Times found that the "important political argument at the core of Peter Navarro's agitprop documentary" was "drowned out by xenophobic hysteria and exaggerations so rampant it becomes impossible to tell light from heat." He concluded by saying "Substituting rhetoric for argument, 'Death by China' doesn't preach to the choir so much as it holds a revival meeting in an empty tent." Ronnie Scheib, from Variety, says "One need not fully subscribe to Peter Navarro's demonization to appreciate his lucid wake-up call to the imminent dangers of the huge U.S.-China trade imbalance and its disastrous impact on the American economy."

Rotten Tomatoes gives the documentary a score of 33% based on reviews from 12 critics, with an average rating of 5/10. Comments include calling it an "unabashedly one-sided and is short on solutions" (Neil Genzlinger, The New York Times), a "rabid piece of agitprop, which swamps a number of legitimate arguments against the current trade arrangement between the U.S. and China with the strident brushstrokes of a bad editorial cartoon" (Scott Tobias, The A.V. Club), and "[a]ngry, fatally biased but watchable documentary ranting at China for its transgressions and damage done to the U.S. economy cries out for second opinions from other corners besides those damning" (Doris Toumarkine, Film Journal International). According to a 2017 article by Zeeshan Aleem from Vox, President Trump's endorsement was featured on the documentary's official website, "DEATH BY CHINA is right on. This important documentary depicts our problem with China with facts, figures and insight. I urge you to see it."
