= COMSTAC =

US Federal Aviation Administration advisory board

The Commercial Space Transportation Advisory Committee (COMSTAC) is an advisory board within the US Federal Aviation Administration (FAA). It was established in 1984 and provides information, advice, and recommendations to the FAA administrator within the U.S. Department of Transportation (DOT) on issues regarding the U.S. commercial space transportation industry.

== Goals and objectives ==
According to the FAA website, the primary goals of COMSTAC are to:

- Evaluate economic, technological and institutional developments within to the U.S. commercial space transportation industry (or relating to that industry).
- Provide a forum for discussion of issues stemming from interactions of industry activities and government requirements.
- Make recommendations to the Administrator on issues and approaches for Federal policies and programs regarding the industry.

COMSTAC addresses industry issues through its various working groups, which provide recommendations to the full committee for adoption. Once a recommendation is adopted by the full committee, it is submitted to the FAA Administrator as an official industry recommendation. In addition to standing working groups, ad hoc working groups or special task groups are established to address specific short-term and/or current critical issues. COMSTAC currently has four working groups:

- Technology and Innovation
- Launch Operations and Support
- Risk Management
- Reusable Launch Vehicle

== Membership ==
COMSTAC membership is made up of senior executives from the commercial space transportation industry; representatives from the satellite industry (manufacturers and users); state and local government officials; representatives from insurance firms, financial investment and legal services for commercial space activities; and representatives from space advocacy organizations and industry associations.
