= Peter Navarro =

American economist and author (born 1949)

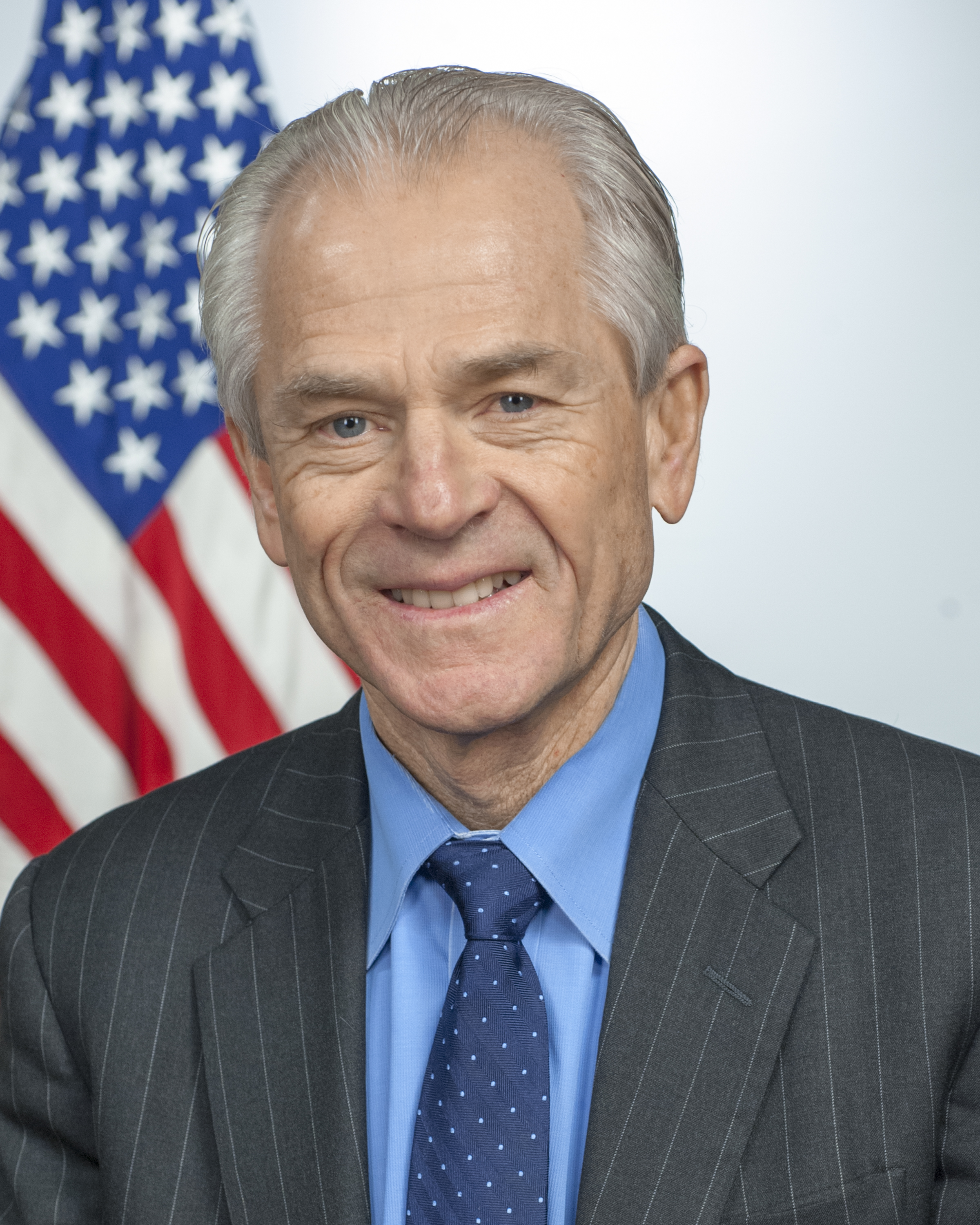
- Official portrait, 2017

Senior Counselor to the President for Trade and Manufacturing
- Incumbent
- Assumed office January 20, 2025
- President: Donald Trump
- Preceded by: Position established

Director of the Office of Trade and Manufacturing Policy
- In office April 29, 2017 – January 20, 2021
- President: Donald Trump
- Preceded by: Position established
- Succeeded by: Position abolished

Director of the National Trade Council
- In office January 20, 2017 – April 29, 2017
- President: Donald Trump
- Preceded by: Position established
- Succeeded by: Position abolished

Personal details
- Born: Peter Kent Navarro; July 15, 1949 (age 77) Cambridge, Massachusetts, U.S.
- Party: Democratic (before 1986; 1994–2018); Independent (1986–1989; 1991–1994); Republican (1989–1991; 2018–present)
- Spouse(s): Leslie Lebon (m. 2001; div. 2020) Bonnie Brenner (m. 2026)
- Education: Tufts University (BA); Harvard University (MPA, PhD)
- Scientific career
- Fields: Economics
- Thesis: A theoretical and empirical investigation of corporate charity motives (1986)
- Doctoral advisor: Richard E. Caves
- Notable students: Puma Shen

Peter Kent Navarro (born July 15, 1949) is an American economist who has been the senior counselor for trade and manufacturing to U.S. president Donald Trump since January 2025. He previously served in the first Trump administration, first as the director of the White House National Trade Council, then as the director of the new Office of Trade and Manufacturing Policy.

Navarro is a professor emeritus of economics and public policy at the Paul Merage School of Business of the University of California, Irvine. Navarro ran unsuccessfully for office in San Diego, California, five times. In January 2017, he joined the first Trump administration as an advisor on trade. As a senior administration official, Navarro encouraged Trump to implement protectionist trade policies. In particular, he advocated for hardline policies towards China and was a key figure behind the administration's trade war against China; he was sanctioned by China after leaving office. During his final year in the Trump administration, Navarro was involved in the administration's COVID-19 response. He was also named the national Defense Production Act policy coordinator in 2020. Early on, he issued private warnings within the administration about the threat posed by the virus, but downplayed the risks in public. He publicly clashed with Anthony Fauci, the director of the National Institute of Allergy and Infectious Diseases, as Navarro advocated hydroxychloroquine as a treatment for COVID-19 and condemned various public health measures that aimed to stop the spread of the virus.

Navarro sought to overturn the 2020 presidential election and in February 2022 was subpoenaed twice by Congress. Navarro refused to comply and was referred to the Justice Department. In 2022, a grand jury indicted him on two counts of contempt of Congress. In 2023, Navarro was convicted on both counts, and in 2024, he was sentenced to four months in jail, becoming the first former White House official imprisoned on a contempt-of-Congress conviction. In January 2025, he was appointed as the senior counselor for trade and manufacturing for President Trump in his second term. In his second term, Navarro became a key official behind Trump's trade policies, including the imposition of tariffs on Canada, China and Mexico as well as the "reciprocal tariff" policy announced in April 2025.

Navarro's views on trade are significantly outside the mainstream of economic thought, and are widely considered fringe by other economists. A strong proponent of reducing U.S. trade deficits, Navarro is well known for his hardline views on China, describing the country as an existential threat to the United States. He has accused China of unfair trade practices and currency manipulation and called for more confrontational policies towards the country. He has called for increasing the size of the American manufacturing sector, setting high tariffs, and "repatriating global supply chains". He is also a vocal opponent of free trade agreements. Navarro has written books including The Coming China Wars (2006) and Death by China (2011). In several of his books, Navarro quoted a fictional economist named "Ron Vara", an anagram of his surname, as a source of information.

== Early life and education ==
Navarro was born on July 15, 1949, in Cambridge, Massachusetts to an Italian-American family. His father, Albert "Al" Navarro, a saxophonist and clarinetist, led a house band, which played summers in New Hampshire and winters in Florida. After his parents divorced when he was 9 or 10, he lived with his mother, Evelyn Littlejohn, a Saks Fifth Avenue secretary, in Palm Beach, Florida. As a teen, he lived with his mother and brother in a one-bedroom apartment in Bethesda, Maryland. Navarro attended Bethesda-Chevy Chase High School.

Navarro attended Tufts University on an academic scholarship, graduating in 1972 with a Bachelor of Arts degree. He then spent three years from 1973 to 1976 in the U.S. Peace Corps, serving in Thailand, traveling to Laos, South Korea, Japan, India, Myanmar and Malaysia during his holiday breaks. According to The San Diego Union-Tribune, Navarro recalled listening to Voice of America and hearing Jimmy Carter's presidential campaign on a "message of hope". He received a Master of Public Administration from Harvard University's John F. Kennedy School of Government in 1979, and a PhD in economics from Harvard in 1986 under the supervision of Richard E. Caves. His doctoral dissertation was titled "A theoretical and empirical investigation of corporate charity motives".

== Career ==
=== Academic career ===
From 1981 through 1985, he was a research associate at Harvard's Energy and Environmental Policy Center. From 1985 through 1988, he taught at the University of California, San Diego and the University of San Diego. In 1989 he moved to the University of California, Irvine, as a professor of economics and public policy. He continued on the UC Irvine faculty for more than 20 years and is now a professor emeritus. He has worked on energy issues and the relationship between the United States and Asia. He has received multiple teaching awards for MBA courses he has taught.

As a doctoral student in 1984, Navarro wrote a book entitled The Policy Game: How Special Interests and Ideologues are Stealing America, which claimed that special interest groups had led the United States to "a point in its history where it cannot grow and prosper." In the book, he also called for greater workers' compensation to help those who had lost jobs to trade and foreign competition and wrote that "as history has painfully taught, once protectionist wars begin, the likely result is a deadly and well-nigh unstoppable downward spiral by the entire world economy". His doctoral dissertation on why corporations donate to charity is one of his most cited works. He has also done research on the topic of wind energy with Frank Harris, a former student of his.

=== Campaigns for public office ===
While teaching at UC Irvine, Navarro unsuccessfully ran for office five times in San Diego, California. During his campaigns, he primarily focused on limiting the number of houses in the city as well as the number of immigrants. In 1992, he ran for mayor, finishing first (38.2%) in the primary, but lost with 48% to Susan Golding in the runoff. Navarro ran on a no-growth platform during his mayoral campaign. He paid $4,000 in fines and court costs for violating city and state election laws.

In 1993, Navarro ran for San Diego city council, and in 1994 for San Diego County board of supervisors, losing each time. In 1996, he ran for the 49th Congressional District as the Democratic Party nominee, touting himself as an environmental activist, but lost to Republican Brian Bilbray, 52.7% to 41.9%. In 2001, Navarro ran in a special election to fill the District 6 San Diego city council seat but lost in a special election with 7.85% of the vote.

=== Publications on China ===
Navarro has written more than a dozen books on various topics in economics, specializing in the balance of trade. He has published peer-reviewed economics research on energy policy, charity, deregulation, and the economics of trash collection. The Economist magazine wrote that Navarro "is a prolific writer, but has no publications in top-tier academic journals" and "his research interests are broader than the average economist's." In 2001 Navarro started writing investing books including If It's Raining in Brazil, Buy Starbucks: The Investor's Guide to Profiting from News and Other Market-Moving Events.

Navarro focused his attention on China in the mid-2000s. Navarro has said that he started to examine China when he noticed that his former students at UC Irvine were losing jobs, concluding that China was at fault and said that "all roads began leading to Beijing". He wrote that China was flooding the U.S. with cheap goods, "thereby beginning to put Americans like my MBA students out of work." He then tasked his students to research how China was able to price their products more cheaply compared to the rest of the world.

His first publication on the subject is the 2006 book The Coming China Wars, a book published by Financial Times in 2006 In the book, Navarro examined China as an emerging world power confronting challenges at home and abroad as it struggles to exert itself in the global market. He discussed how China's role in international commerce created conflicts with nations worldwide over energy, natural resources, the environment, intellectual property, and other issues. A review in Publishers Weekly described the book as "comprehensive" and "contemporary" and concluded that it "will teach readers to understand the dragon, just not how to vanquish it".

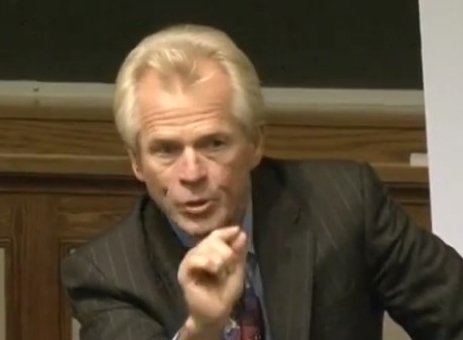
Appearing at the University of Michigan in 2012, Navarro discusses his work, Death by China, arguing China cheats in the world trade system.

In Death by China, published in 2011, Navarro and co-author Greg Autry argued that China violates fair trade by "illegal export subsidies and currency manipulation, effectively flooding the U.S. markets" and unfairly making it "virtually impossible" for American companies to compete. It is a critique of "global capitalism", including foreign labor practices and environmental protection. Currency manipulation and subsidies are stated as reasons that "American companies cannot compete because they're not competing with Chinese companies, they're competing with the Chinese government." The Economist wrote that "the core allegations Mr. Navarro makes against China are not all that controversial. He accuses China of keeping its currency cheap" and "He deplores China's practice of forcing American firms to hand over intellectual property as a condition of access to its market. He claims that Chinese firms pollute the environment more freely and employ workers in far worse conditions than American rules allow." In 2012, Navarro directed and produced Death by China, a documentary film based on his book. The film, described as "fervently anti-China", was narrated by Martin Sheen.

=== Trump campaign advisor ===
According to Navarro, his first contact with Donald Trump came after a 2011 blog post in the Los Angeles Times that described Trump's supposed 20 favorite books on China, which included Death by China. Though whether the interview is authentic is uncertain, it still prompted an exchange of messages with Trump. Navarro received a letter as a reply by Trump assistant Rhona Graff, with the letter containing Trump's handwritten notes. Navarro continued to exchange notes with Trump through Graff afterwards. In 2016, Navarro served as an economic policy adviser to Trump's 2016 presidential campaign. Navarro was invited to be an advisor after Trump's advisor and son-in-law Jared Kushner saw on Amazon that he co-wrote Death by China. In his memoir Breaking History, Kushner wrote that he liked the thesis of Death by China so much that he hired the "eccentric former professor" as the Trump campaign's trade adviser.

According to Navarro's memoir, he was strolling on Victoria Beach near his home in Laguna Beach, California, when he got a call from Stephen Miller; they talked about an upcoming Trump speech in Pittsburgh that blamed globalization for the shuttering of steel mills; Navarro called the speech "pure MAGA magic". During the campaign, Navarro advocated for an isolationist and protectionist American foreign policy. Miller was the primary advocate for having Navarro join the campaign full time. Navarro was given an office on the 14th floor of Trump Tower, where he worked on economic plans that heavily focused on starting a trade war against China. Navarro and the international private equity investor Wilbur Ross authored an economic plan for the Trump campaign in September 2016. When told that the Tax Policy Center assessment of Trump's economic plan said it would reduce federal revenues by $6 trillion and reduce economic growth in the long term, Navarro said that the analysis demonstrated "a high degree of analytical and political malfeasance". When the Peterson Institute for International Economics estimated that Trump's economic plan would cost millions of Americans their jobs, Navarro said that writers at the Peterson Institute "weave a false narrative and they come up with some phony numbers."

According to MIT economist Simon Johnson, the economic plan essay authored by Navarro and Ross for Trump during the campaign had projections "based on assumptions so unrealistic that they seem to have come from a different planet. If the United States really did adopt Trump's plan, the result would be an immediate and unmitigated disaster." In October 2016, along with Wilbur Ross and Andrew Puzder, Navarro co-authored an essay titled "Donald Trump's Contract with the American Voter". When 370 economists, including 19 Nobel laureates, signed a letter warning against Trump's stated economic policies in November 2016, Navarro said that the letter was "an embarrassment to the corporate offshoring wing of the economist profession who continues to insist bad trade deals are good for America."

== First Trump administration (2017–2021) ==
=== White House trade advisor ===
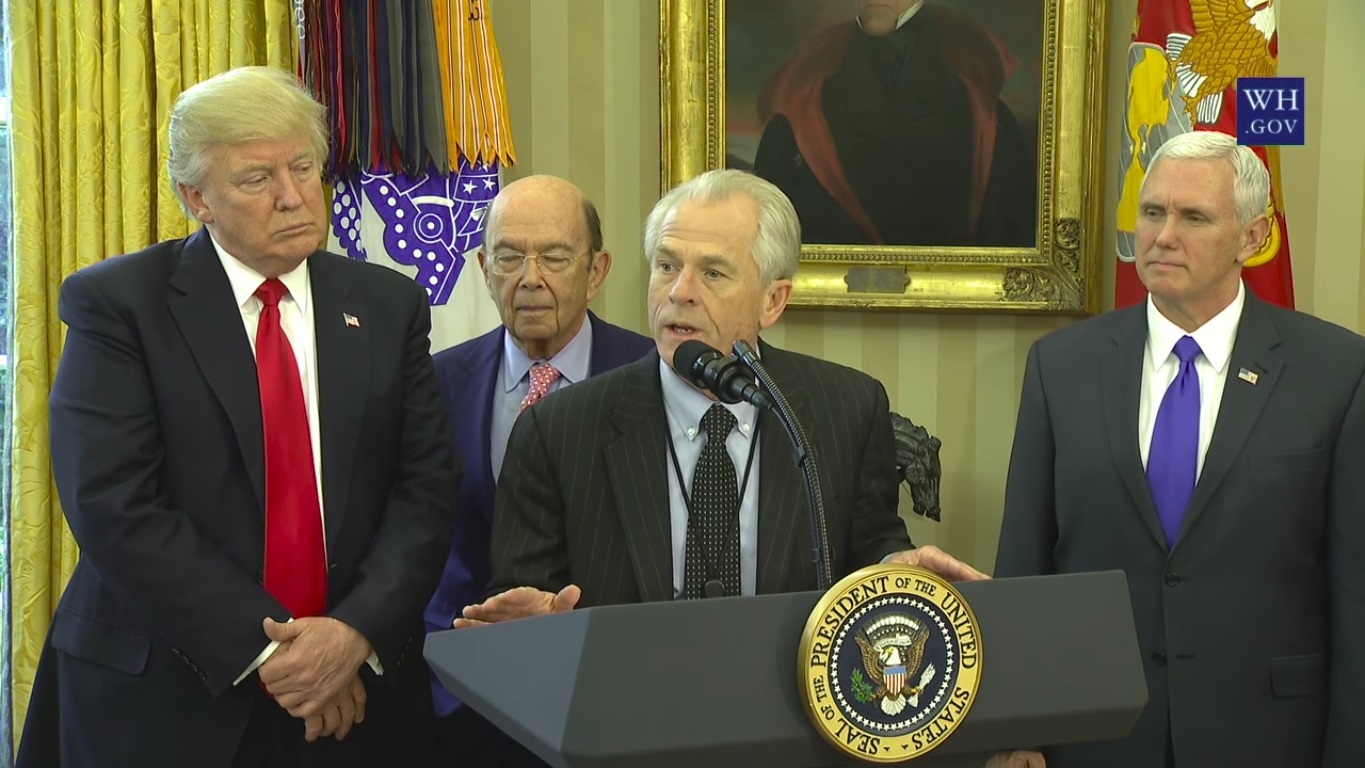
Director Peter Navarro addresses President Donald Trump's promises to American people, workers, and domestic manufacturers (Declaring American Economic Independence on June 28, 2016) in the Oval Office with Vice President Mike Pence and Secretary of Commerce Wilbur Ross before President Trump signs Executive Orders regarding trade in March 2017.

According to Navarro, he was initially promised to be appointed as the National Economic Council, but the position was instead given to Gary Cohn. On December 21, 2016, Navarro was selected by President-elect Trump to a newly created position as director of the White House National Trade Council. In the first three weeks of his administration, Navarro was not assigned an office on the White House campus and instead had to work out of his house. Navarro was first allowed to see Trump in the Oval Office in early March; in the meeting, he had a big argument with Cohn. Early in the administration, Navarro was allied with speechwriter Stephen Miller and White House strategist Steve Bannon; the latter had read Navarro's books about China and used his influence on Trump to advance Navarro's views.

In the administration, Navarro was a hawkish advisor on trade, as he encouraged Trump to implement protectionist trade policies. He was also a key official in the China–United States trade war and influential in tougher policies towards China. The New York Times wrote in 2019 that Navarro "has managed to exert enormous influence over United States trade policy" in the Trump administration. In explaining his role in the Trump administration, Navarro said that he is there to "provide the underlying analytics that confirm [Trump's] intuition [on trade]. And his intuition is always right in these matters."

=== Director of Office of Trade and Manufacturing Policy ===
In April 2017, the National Trade Council became part of the Office of Trade and Manufacturing Policy, of which Navarro was appointed Director. By September 2017, the Office of Trade and Manufacturing Policy had been folded into the National Economic Council by Chief of Staff John F. Kelly, which meant that Navarro would report to NEC director Gary Cohn. This was seen as a demotion for Navarro, as he was known to have strongly clashed with Cohn and his views on trade; Navarro later described him as "one of the worst and most treacherous misfits of the entire Trump administration".

In February 2018, several media outlets reported that Navarro's influence in the administration was rising again and that he would likely be promoted from the secondary billet of Deputy Assistant to the President to Assistant to the President, giving Navarro parity with the NEC director. Josh Rogin, writing for The Washington Post, reported that Navarro had used his prior time of lower influence to lead several low-profile policy items, such as working to increase military funding, drafting Executive Order 13806, and leading the effort to solve a dispute between the United States and Qatar over the Open Skies Agreement between the two countries. In March 2018, Cohn left the Trump administration, further solidifying Navarro's influence.

During the campaign, Navarro, together with Wilbur Ross, who became Trump's commerce secretary, designed a $1 trillion infrastructure development plan for Trump's presidential campaign. The plan called for $137 billion in tax credits to private business to induce them to finance the bulk of infrastructure spending. Economists across the political spectrum derided the proposal. Trump released a $1.5 trillion version of this plan in February 2018 but the Republican-controlled Congress showed little enthusiasm for the proposal, with The Hill reporting, "President Trump's infrastructure plan appears to have crashed and burned in Congress".

In June 2018, Navarro said that there was "a special place in hell" for Canadian prime minister Justin Trudeau, after Trudeau said that Canada would respond to U.S. tariffs against Canada with retaliatory tariffs. Trudeau's remarks and Canada's response to these tariffs were already public and well known when Navarro made this comment. Navarro later apologized. In 2018, Navarro supported the United States Fair and Reciprocal Tariff Act, which would have given the President sweeping powers over trade policy. He lobbied heavily in the United States Congress for the bill and its successor called the United States Reciprocal Trade Act, though the act ultimately did not pass. In May 2019, Navarro said that Trump's decision to place tariffs on Mexico unless Mexico stopped illegal immigration to the United States was "a brilliant move".

In February 2020, it was reported that Navarro was conducting his own investigation into the identity of the author of an anonymous op-ed in The New York Times criticizing the Trump Administration. The United States Office of Special Counsel ruled in December 2020 that Navarro repeatedly violated the Hatch Act by using his official capacity to influence elections in speaking against Trump's opponent Joe Biden during the presidential campaign.

==== China ====
According to Chaos Under Heaven, a book by Josh Rogin, Navarro was part of a group of officials that wanted Trump to "speed the downfall" of the Chinese Communist Party and that "believed in economic nationalism, the return of manufacturing from abroad, and the protection of domestic industries, even at the expense of free trade". In his 2021 book In Trump Time, Navarro wrote that he urged Trump to go "full Sudden Zen" and start an all-out trade war against China. He also described himself as a "one-man China hawk totally without power or allies in a White House filled with a symphony of Wall Street transactionalists and China dove appeasers". In 2018, Navarro was influential in pushing the Trump administration to initiate the China–United States trade war. After the start of the trade war, Navarro argued that no countries would retaliate against U.S. tariffs "for the simple reason that we are the most lucrative and biggest market in the world". Shortly after the implementation of the tariffs, other countries did implement retaliatory tariffs against the United States, and the World Trade Organization rejected the U.S. tariffs.

Navarro clashed frequently with Treasury Secretary Steven Mnuchin, who had a more moderate stance on trade with China; Navarro accused Mnuchin without evidence of having "made millions from Communist China." In May 2018, during a visit to China for trade talks, Navarro and Mnuchin started screaming and cursing at each other on the lawn in front of the Chinese government building where the talks were held after Navarro confronted Mnuchin because he believed that he had been excluded from certain meetings with Chinese officials. During the trip, which was his second ever to China, Navarro was described as having "acted strangely", including by insisting on keeping his luggage with him at all times, wanting to sleep inside the U.S. embassy because he feared hotel surveillance and having "rudely refused to eat the food served to him in official functions".

In October 2018, Navarro supported a proposal by Stephen Miller to stop providing student visas to Chinese nationals, making it impossible for Chinese citizens to study in the United States. In August 2019, Navarro asserted the tariffs of the ongoing China–United States trade war were not hurting Americans. Citing extensive evidence to the contrary, PolitiFact rated Navarro's assertion "Pants on Fire." In September 2019, after Trump tasked him with combatting China's usage of international mail rates to more cheaply ship products into the US, Navarro successfully led a diplomatic effort to the Third Extraordinary Congress of the Universal Postal Union, where it agreed member countries could opt-in to self-declare their rates starting in July 2020. This agreement arose following repeated threats from the Trump administration to leave the UPU unless global postage rates were changed; at the summit, Navarro claimed that countries like China were unfairly benefitting from international delivery prices, particularly regarding e-commerce deliveries.

In October 2019, Navarro defended the trade war with China, saying that the United States was "dealing with a strategic rival – and they are trying to buckle our knees". Navarro continued to advocate for trade restrictionist policies even while the administration was trying to reach a compromise in trade negotiations with China. Navarro worked with the DHS to initiate a crackdown on counterfeited and pirated e-commerce goods from overseas, and he promoted the administration's actions on the matter. Trump signed an executive order on the matter on January 31, 2020. In August 2020, Mnuchin and Navarro started a shouting match in the Oval Office in front of Trump about the fate of TikTok in what was described by The Washington Post as a "knockdown, drag-out brawl". Mnuchin began arguing that TikTok should be sold to a U.S. company, while Navarro demanded an outright ban on the app.

On January 20, 2021, the Chinese government imposed sanctions against Navarro and 27 other Trump administration officials who "planned, promoted and executed a series of crazy moves, gravely interfered in China's internal affairs, undermined China's interests, offended the Chinese people, and seriously disrupted China-U.S. relations". The sanctions ban them from entering China, including Hong Kong and Macau, and restrict companies and institutions associated with them from doing business in China.

==== Coronavirus pandemic ====
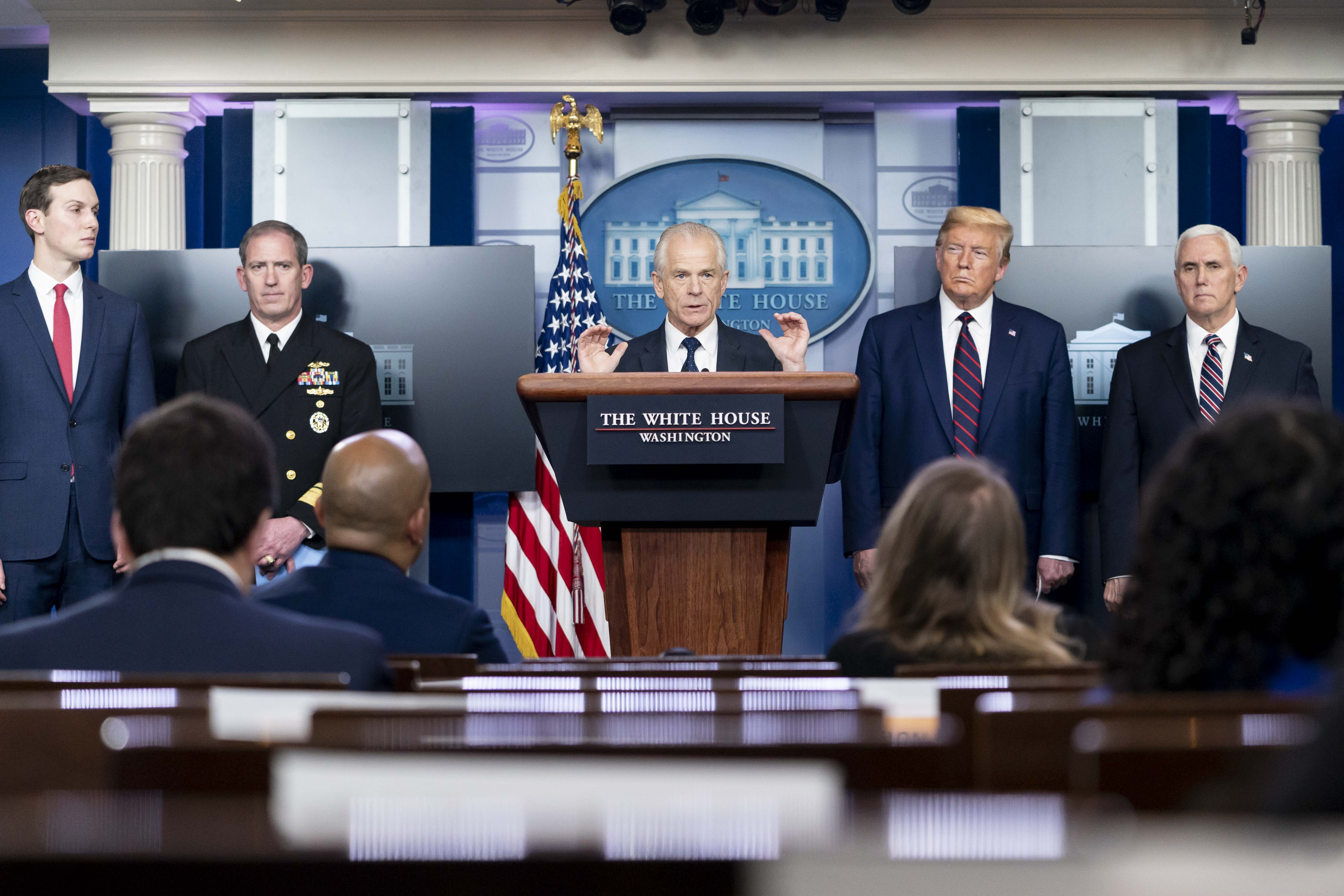
Navarro taking questions from the press during a coronavirus update briefing, April 2, 2020

During his final year in the first Trump administration, Navarro was involved in the administration's COVID-19 response. On January 29, 2020, Navarro issued a memo warning that novel coronavirus could "evolv[e] into a full-blown pandemic, imperiling the lives of millions of Americans" and that the "risk of a worst-case pandemic scenario should not be overlooked". He argued for restrictions on travel from China. Navarro wrote another memo on February 23, 2020, arguing that the disease "could infect as many as 100 million Americans, with a loss of life of as many as 1–2 million souls" and calling for an "immediate supplemental appropriation of at least $3 billion." At the same time that Navarro issued these private warnings, he publicly stated that the American people had "nothing to worry about" regarding the coronavirus.

On March 27, 2020, Trump appointed Navarro to coordinate the federal government's Defense Production Act policy response during the coronavirus pandemic. In this position, Navarro promoted domestic production of coronavirus-related supplies in addition to a general nationalist agenda. He advocated for reducing U.S. reliance on foreign supply chains, stating that "never again should we rely on the rest of the world for our essential medicines and countermeasures." Among other statements, he accused China of "profiteering" from the coronavirus and warned of economic disruptions resulting from the virus.

In February 2020, biologist Steven Hatfill became Navarro's advisor with regard to the coronavirus pandemic. Hatfill was a strong promoter of the malaria drug hydroxychloroquine as a treatment for COVID, even though the drug's effectiveness was unproven. By April, Navarro, and the president himself, were touting the drug as a lifesaver. Navarro clashed with Anthony Fauci, the director of the National Institute of Allergy and Infectious Diseases, over whether the administration should promote the use of hydroxychloroquine to treat the virus. In July 2020, Navarro touted a widely criticized study as showing that hydroxychloroquine was an effective coronavirus treatment; public health experts pointed to limitations with the study and to the fact that multiple randomized controlled trials failed to conclude that hydroxychloroquine was an effective treatment.

In May 2020, Navarro criticized stay-at-home orders, arguing that the COVID-19 lockdowns would kill "many more" people than the coronavirus. He frequently referred to the virus as the "China virus" or the "CCP virus" and, in May 2020, accused the Chinese government of sending Chinese citizens to other countries to "seed" the virus. In July 2020, USA Today published an editorial by Navarro under the headline "Anthony Fauci has been wrong about everything I have interacted with him on", after which White House officials disavowed Navarro's attacks. Under criticism for the editorial, the newspaper later published an apologetic statement that read, in part, "several of Navarro's criticisms of Fauci – on the China travel restrictions, the risk from the coronavirus and falling mortality rates – were misleading or lacked context. As such, Navarro's op-ed did not meet USA Today's fact-checking standards." During a Fox News appearance in March 2021, Navarro echoed a baseless conspiracy theory that Fauci was the "father" of the virus and had used taxpayer money to finance a Chinese laboratory where it was supposedly developed.

In August 2020, administration officials terminated a contract to purchase 42,900 ventilators for use in the pandemic that Navarro had directly negotiated for. A US Department of Health and Human Services (HHS) spokesperson said the cancellation was "subject to internal HHS investigation and legal review", as an oversight subcommittee of the US House of Representatives concluded that the government had overpaid for the ventilators by US$500 million. The Washington Post reported in March 2021 that congressional investigators were examining whether Navarro had directed over $1 billion in federal funds for medical supplies to companies of his selection, after President Trump had rejected his recommendations.

==== Attempts to overturn the 2020 election ====
In October 2020, two weeks before the presidential elections, Navarro's office in the White House had begun preparing allegations of election fraud. In December 2020, Navarro published a report alleging widespread election fraud. The report repeated discredited conspiracy theories claiming election fraud, including allegations that had been dismissed by the courts and Trump's own election security task force. In the report, Navarro wrote that large initial leads by Trump in battleground states, which turned to leads for Biden as vote counting progressed suggested impropriety, Navarro was actually describing the well-known phenomenon of the "blue shift", caused by the fact that mail-in votes in many states cannot be counted on Election Day itself; those votes tend to lean Democratic, so that an Election Night lead by a Republican candidate can turn into a Democratic lead as the later counts come in. In the report, Navarro cited many biased and unreliable sources of information, such as One America News Network, Newsmax, Steve Bannon's podcast War Room: Pandemic, John Solomon's Just the News, and Raheem Kassam's The National Pulse, because they provided what he termed "alternative coverage".

On January 2, 2021, Navarro, along with Rudy Giuliani and Mark Meadows, participated in a call with Georgia election officials in which Trump urged them to overturn the results of the election. During a January 2, 2021, appearance on Jeanine Pirro's Fox News program, Navarro asserted, "[t]hey stole this and we can prove it," and falsely asserted Joe Biden's inauguration could be postponed to allow for an investigation.

Navarro and Bannon coordinated an effort on January 6, 2021 – called "The Green Bay Sweep" – with more than 100 Republican state legislators. Navarro later stated, "We spent a lot of time lining up over 100 congressmen, including some senators. It started out perfectly. At 1 p.m. [on January 6], Gosar and Cruz did exactly what was expected of them ... My role was to provide the receipts for the 100 congressmen or so who would make their cases… who could rely in part on the body of evidence I'd collected". In the wake of the storming of the Capitol on January 6, 2021, Navarro appeared on Fox Business Network's Making Money on January 8, telling host Charles Payne that Trump was not to blame and specifically saying that Lindsey Graham, Nikki Haley, and Mitt Romney "need to shut up". Days later, Navarro reiterated false claims that Trump had won the election.

Later in 2021, Navarro published In Trump Time, a book in which he describes how he, Bannon, and others worked to delay or overturn Congress's counting of the election votes formalizing Biden's victory, in part through a failed scheme to try to get Pence to "reject" electoral votes for Biden, something Pence had no power to do. In December 2021, Navarro was still claiming that his falsehoods were meant "to lay the legal predicate for the actions to be taken", despite no evidence of voting fraud being found.

== Post-administration (2021–2025) ==
=== Arrests ===
==== Contempt of Congress conviction and prison stay ====
On February 9, 2022, the House Select Committee on the January 6 Attack subpoenaed Navarro to provide documents and testimony. He refused to do so and ignored both subpoenas. He made media appearances to defend this behavior in the press. He claimed that Trump was asserting executive privilege on his behalf, so he was exempt from the subpoenas – although, in fact, the president in office, Joe Biden, had possessed sole discretion to assert executive privilege since the end of the Trump administration, and had not done so on Navarro's behalf. Moreover, despite Navarro's claims in the news media, he did not identify any supporting evidence that Trump had even attempted to assert the privilege on his behalf. Ultimately, Navarro ignored all requirements of both subpoenas without effectively asserting any legally cognizable privilege or exemption. On April 6, 2022, the House of Representatives voted to hold Navarro and Dan Scavino in contempt for their refusals to testify before the House Select Committee based on executive privilege claims. In May 2022, Navarro said he had been subpoenaed by a federal grand jury and ordered to surrender any documents he had related to the January 6, 2021 attack on the U.S. Capitol. Navarro unsuccessfully sought to block both the House committee's subpoena and the grand jury subpoena.

On June 2, 2022, a grand jury impaneled in the United States District Court for the District of Columbia indicted Navarro on two counts of contempt of Congress. Count 1 of the indictment alleged Navarro refused to comply with a subpoena to produce documents; Count 2 alleged refusal to comply with a subpoena for testimony. Under the applicable law (2 U.S.C. § 192) each count is a misdemeanor punishable by up to one year imprisonment. Navarro was arrested by deputy U.S. marshals at Reagan National Airport as he was about to board a plane to Nashville. U.S. district judge Amit Mehta on July 15, 2022, signaled that he agreed that the treatment of Navarro at the outset of the criminal case was "unreasonably harsh," noting that the government did not offer self-surrender to Navarro.

Navarro claimed that Trump had privately asked him to invoke "executive privilege" over the documents sought by the congressional subpoena. In January 2023, Judge Mehta denied Navarro's effort to dismiss the charges against him, writing, "Defendant has failed to come forward with any evidence to support the claimed assertion of privilege. And, because the claimed assertion of executive privilege is unproven, Defendant cannot avoid prosecution for contempt." Mehta noted that Mark Meadows and Dan Scavino (two other Trump advisors whom the House committee had also sought to prosecute for contempt) had produced letters from Trump, in which he directed them to assert executive privilege on his behalf. DOJ chose not to prosecute Meadows and Scavino, and Mehta cited Navarro's failure to produce any similar letter from Trump. Mehta also rejected Navarro's bid to argue that the congressional subpoena was procedurally invalid. In a pretrial hearing in August 2023, Navarro claimed that Trump had told him in a February 2022 phone call not to testify to the House committee but failed to produce any evidence of what Trump actually said in the conversation. Trump had already said he would not testify at Navarro's trial. Two days later, Judge Mehta ruled that Navarro could not claim an "executive privilege" not to testify before the House committee. After the ruling against him, Navarro tried – and failed – to grab a demonstrator's "Trump lost" sign from her at a press conference outside the courthouse.

On September 5, 2023, a jury was seated. Three former congressional committee staffers testified as prosecution witnesses; Navarro declined to testify in his own defense or to offer any witnesses for the defense. Navarro's criminal defense lawyer was Stanley Woodward Jr. Navarro told reporters that he expected to face legal bills of $750,000. He later said that Trump helped pay $300,000 and while he raised more in an appeal on a website. After a two-day trial, Navarro was convicted on both counts of contempt of Congress; the jury rejected Navarro's argument that he had not willfully refused to comply with the subpoena. Navarro was the second ex-Trump aide to be convicted of contempt of Congress; Bannon had been convicted of the same offense the preceding year. On January 16, 2024, a federal judge denied Navarro's request for a new trial.

On September 7, 2023, Navarro was convicted on both counts and on January 25, 2024, he was sentenced to four months in jail and fined $9,500. He filed an appeal. Judge Mehta and the Court of Appeals for the District of Columbia Circuit denied his request to stay out of prison during the appeal. He was ordered to report to a minimum-security federal prison in Miami, Florida by March 19, 2024. Navarro appealed to the Supreme Court to stay the order, but Chief Justice John Roberts rejected the appeal on March 18 in a single-paragraph in-chambers opinion. Navarro spent March 19 – July 17 incarcerated in the elderly prisoner unit of a U.S. Federal penitentiary, becoming the first former White House official ever imprisoned on contempt of Congress conviction. While in prison, he asked to spend the final 30 days of his sentence on supervised release, but Mehta denied his request. During Navarro's prison stay, he was visited by Trump's son Donald Jr., according to his prison consultant Sam Mangel. On July 21, 2026, his appeal to overturn his conviction was rejected by the Court of Appeals.

Navarro was released on July 17, 2024. Within hours of being released from prison, Navarro gave a prime time speech endorsing Trump for a second term at the 2024 Republican National Convention in Milwaukee, Wisconsin. In the convention, Navarro said "The J6 committee demanded that I betray Donald John Trump to save my own skin. I refused." In 2025, interim U.S. Attorney for the District of Columbia Ed Martin demoted Elizabeth Aloi and John Crabb Jr., who worked as prosecutors in Navarro's case, to low-level positions. Navarro stated that he is not seeking a pardon from President Trump.

==== Refusal to produce presidential records to National Archives ====
In August 2022, the Department of Justice sued Navarro in the U.S. District Court for the District of Columbia, seeking to compel him to produce official business-related emails from a personal ProtonMail account that he used to conduct White House business. After Trump left office in January 2021, Navarro refused requests from the National Archives to return the records, demanding immunity before he would release the emails. Navarro acknowledged that he had kept between 200 and 250 records that belonged to the government but claimed that there were no legal means to require him to return the records to the National Archives and that producing the emails would infringe his Fifth Amendment rights against self-incrimination.

In March 2023, U.S. district judge Colleen Kollar-Kotelly ordered Navarro to promptly turn over the records, ruling that Navarro had a "plain" duty to turn over the records to NARA under the Presidential Records Act, which requires government business-related messages on personal accounts to be forwarded to official accounts within 20 business days. Navarro appealed to the D.C. Circuit Court of Appeals. In April 2023, the D.C. Circuit unanimously denied Navarro's request for a stay of the district court's order, writing: "There is no public interest in Navarro's retention of the records, and Congress has recognized that the public has an interest in the Nation's possession and retention of Presidential records." After the appeals court denied Navarro's stay request, Judge Kollar-Kotelly ordered Navarro to turn over the 200 to 250 records and to conduct searches for additional presidential records. In February 2024, Kollar-Kotelly said she would appoint a magistrate judge and consider holding Navarro in contempt to ensure his compliance.

== Second Trump administration (2025–present) ==
On December 4, 2024, President-elect Donald Trump announced Navarro would be the senior counselor for trade and manufacturing in his second term. He is one of the few officials from Trump's first term to return for his second term. He assumed office on January 20, 2025.

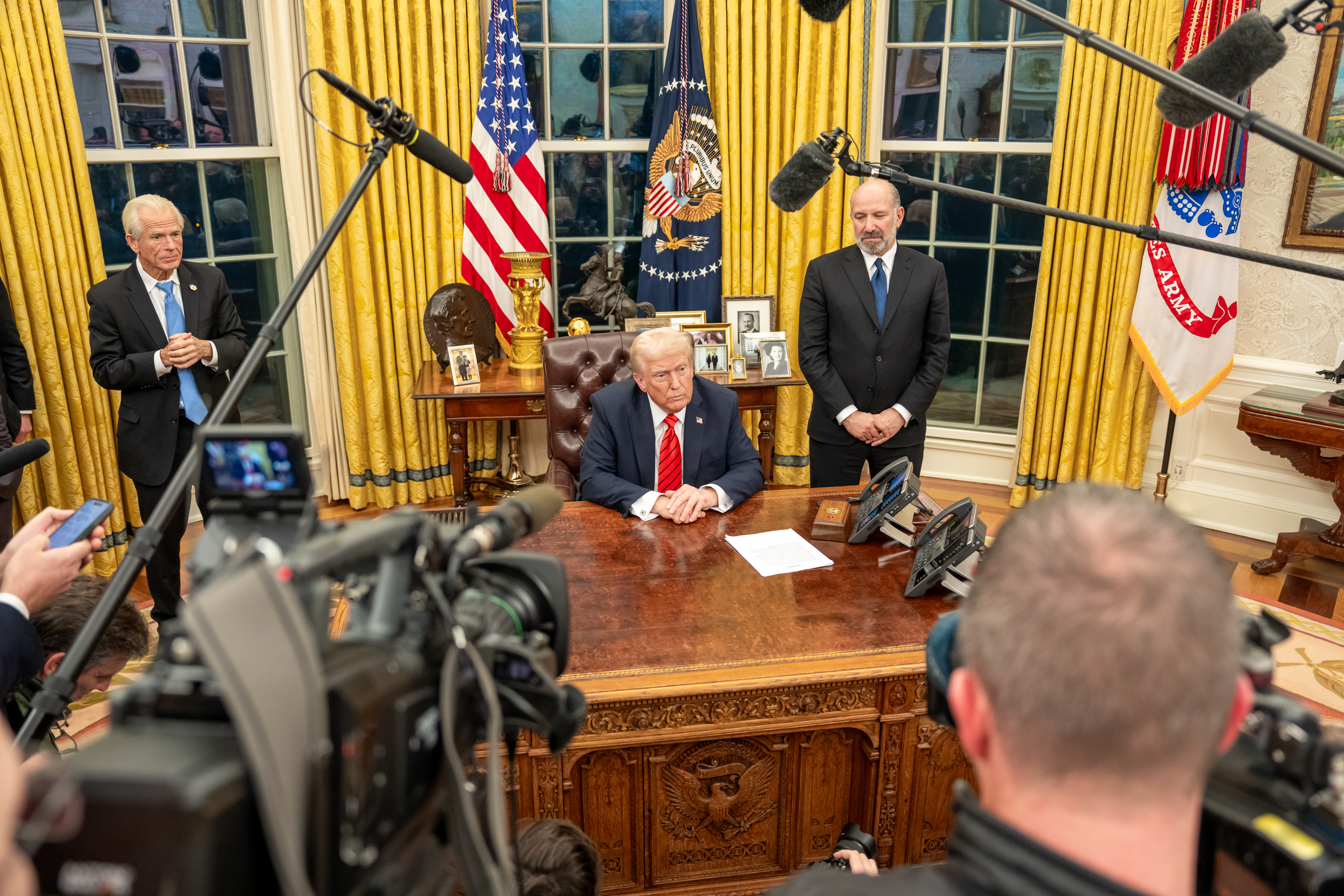
President Donald Trump signing Executive Orders, February 10, 2025, in the Oval Office. Navarro is standing behind Trump (left).

In January 2025, amidst Trump's threats to put tariffs on Canada and Mexico, Navarro called NAFTA a "catastrophe" in an interview and said because "China was so much worse," it was ignored "how bad NAFTA was." He also linked America's problems with illegal immigration to NAFTA, saying since the US started exporting corn to Mexico, many Mexican agricultural workers lost their jobs, sending some to the US. In February 2025, Navarro and Stephen Miller were the leading officials in the economic discussions regarding the imposition of tariffs on Canada, China and Mexico. Navarro was a key official behind Trump's decision to adopt a trade policy memo on the first day of his presidency, his decision to impose 25% tariffs on all steel and aluminum imports to the U.S., as well as his decision to adopt so-called "reciprocal tariffs" for every country. Navarro successfully pushed the Trump administration to close the de minimis duty exemption for China, which allowed Chinese products worth less than $800 to be imported duty-free.

The Financial Times reported in February 2025 that Navarro proposed expelling Canada from the Five Eyes. A few days later, The Daily Telegraph reported that Navarro pushed US negotiators to start discussions with Canada about reworking and redrawing the Canada–United States border, which reportedly prompted Canada to cease negotiating with the United States until Howard Lutnick and Jamieson Greer were confirmed to their positions by the Senate. Navarro was a key official behind Trump's "reciprocal tariff" policy announced in April; ING Group noted that plans for the policy appeared to align with Navarro's section of Project 2025, titled "The Case for Fair Trade", published in April 2023. Bloomberg News reported that Navarro urged Trump to adopt a 25% tax on imports or "reciprocal" tariffs based on trade deficits; the latter idea was adopted as part of Trump's announcement. The Wall Street Journal and The New York Times reported that Navarro played a central role in developing the administration's "reciprocal" tariff formula. Navarro predicted the tariffs would raise $6 trillion, a figure disputed by The Washington Post's Fact Checker.

On April 5, 2025, Navarro was criticized by Trump advisor Elon Musk, who the NYT estimated to have lost about $31 billion with the new trade tariffs. Musk questioned his educational qualifications from Harvard on X and wrote "He ain't built shit." In response, Navarro said Musk is not a "car manufacturer" but a "car assembler". On April 8, Musk responded by calling Navarro "a moron" and "dumber than a sack of bricks", and said he should consult "the fake expert he invented, Ron Vara". The higher "reciprocal" tariffs were paused on April 9 for 90 days for all countries except China; The Wall Street Journal reported that Treasury Secretary Scott Bessent and Commerce Secretary Howard Lutnick took advantage of Navarro's absence, who was meeting with Kevin Hassett, to meet with Trump in the Oval Office and convince him to announce a pause on tariffs on Truth Social. That same month, he suggested to the president of pressuring Cambodia, Mexico, and Vietnam to not trade with China. On May 4, during an interview with The Daily Telegraph, Navarro accused the United Kingdom of being a "compliant servant of communist China" and said "If the Chinese vampire can't suck the American blood, it's going to suck the U.K. blood and the EU blood".

Navarro has been criticized multiple times for the Trump administration's tariffs against India. On August 7, Kaitlan Collins questioned Navarro on why the U.S. was doubling tariffs on Indian goods over Russian oil imports while not imposing similar penalties on China, which imports more. Navarro responded that China already faced 50% tariffs and warned that increasing them further could harm U.S. interests. Former National Security Adviser John Bolton criticized Navarro's explanation, stating that the tariff policy risked damaging U.S.-India relations and undermining decades of American efforts to align India away from Russia and China. Bolton later alleged that Navarro had attempted to provoke tensions between Trump and Narendra Modi during a meeting that was intended to focus on strategic issues such as "dealing with China." Bolton described the incident as a sideshow, adding, "If you left Peter alone in a room and came back an hour later, he would be in an argument with himself." On August 18, 2025, Navarro criticized India's continued purchases of Russian crude oil, calling them “opportunistic” and accusing India of acting as a “global clearinghouse” for embargoed Russian energy. Writing in the Financial Times, Navarro argued that India was undermining international efforts to isolate Russia and warned that if India “wants to be treated as a strategic partner of the US, it needs to start acting like one.” On August 21, economist Jeffrey Sachs, while condemning the Trump administration's 50% tariffs on Indian goods as “the stupidest tactical move in U.S. foreign policy,” described Navarro as “probably the most incompetent PhD” from his former department, asserting that the policy backfired by weakening U.S.-India relations and strengthening BRICS solidarity. Later, Navarro described the Russia-Ukraine conflict as “Modi’s war,” linking India's purchase of discounted Russian oil to support for Russia's military efforts. In response, journalist Rick Sanchez dismissed Navarro's remarks as “absolutely laughable,” criticizing his understanding of geopolitics and arguing that such statements reflect a broader lack of awareness. Navarro further doubled down on these comments in an August 31 interview on Fox News, where he described Indian purchases of Russian oil as "Brahmins profiteering at the expense of the Indian people".

In September 2025, Navarro dismissed X's Community Notes as “propaganda” after the platform fact-checked his posts accusing India of profiteering from Russian oil and imposing tariffs that he claimed hurt U.S. jobs. Elon Musk defended the system as neutral and open to all perspectives, while the fact-checks reportedly highlighted that India's oil purchases were legal, did not violate sanctions, and served energy security needs. Navarro then accused Indian users of manipulating the platform and called them "keyboard minions".

== Views ==
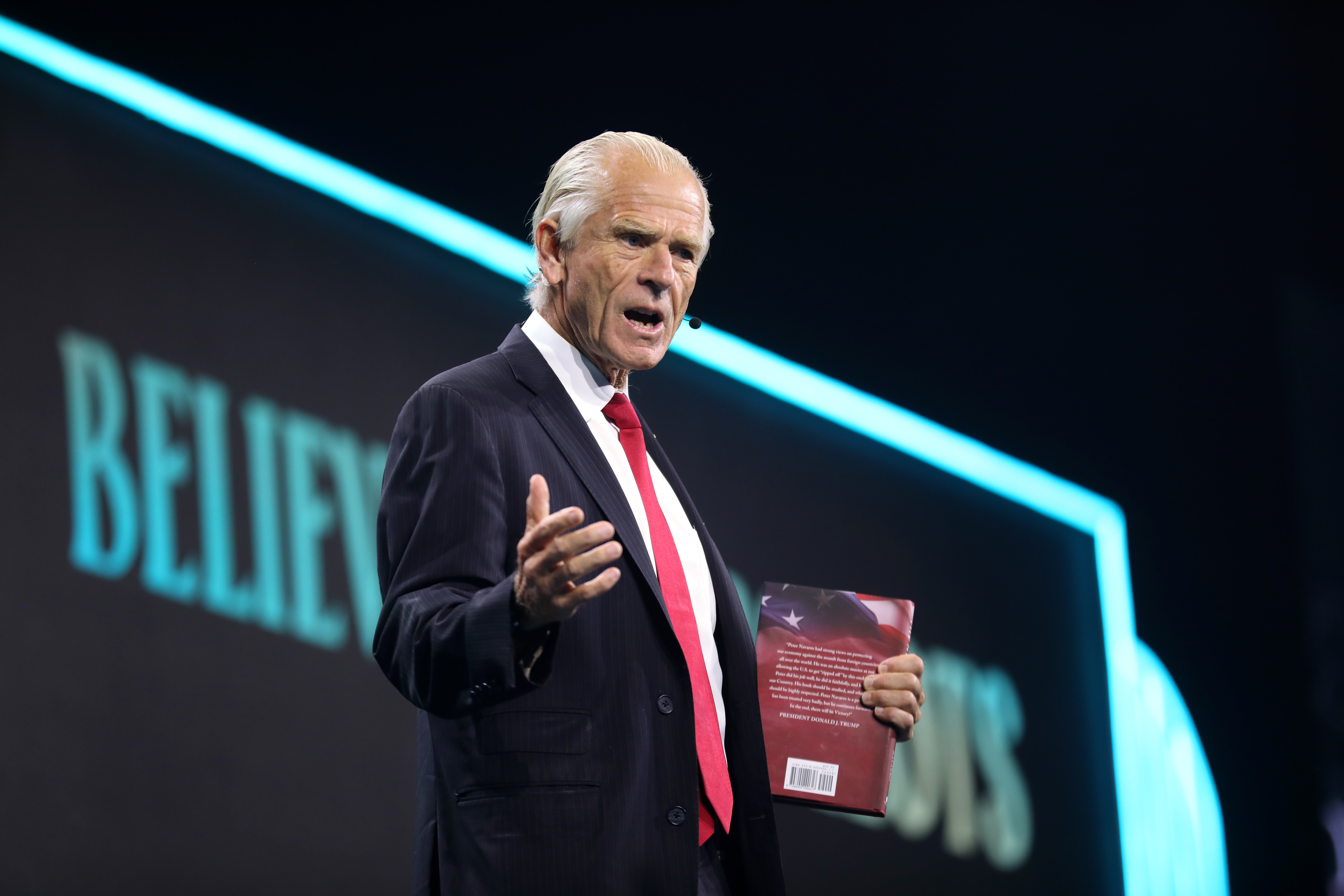
Navarro speaking with attendees at the Believers Summit at the Palm Beach County Convention Center in West Palm Beach, Florida, July 26, 2024

Navarro has been a staunch critic of relations and trade with China and a strong proponent of reducing U.S. trade deficits. He has attacked Germany, Japan, and China for their currency manipulation. An advocate of protectionist policies, he has called for increasing the size of the American manufacturing sector, setting high tariffs, and repatriating global supply chains. He was a fierce opponent of the Trans-Pacific Partnership.

Navarro's views on trade are considered outside the mainstream of economic thought. According to Bloomberg News, Navarro had "roots as a mainstream economist"; he voiced support for free trade in his 1984 book The Policy Game. He changed his positions as he saw "the globalist erosion of the American economy" develop. He would later become a critic of the North American Free Trade Agreement (NAFTA). According to Politico, Navarro's economic theories are "considered fringe" by his fellow economists. A New Yorker reporter described Navarro's views on trade and China as so radical "that, even with his assistance, I was unable to find another economist who fully agrees with them."

The Economist described Navarro as having "oddball views". The George Mason University economist Tyler Cowen has described Navarro as "one of the most versatile and productive American economists of the last few decades", but Cowen noted that he disagreed with his views on trade, which he claimed to go "against a strong professional consensus." University of Michigan economist Justin Wolfers described Navarro's views as "far outside the mainstream," noting that "he endorses few of the key tenets of" the economics profession. According to Lee Branstetter, economics professor at Carnegie Mellon University and trade expert with the Peterson Institute for International Economics, Navarro "was never a part of the group of economists who ever studied the global free-trade system... He doesn't publish in journals. What he's writing and saying right now has nothing to do with what he got his Harvard Ph.D. in... He doesn't do research that would meet the scientific standards of that community." Marcus Noland, an economist at the Peterson Institute for International Economics, described a tax and trade paper written by Navarro and Wilbur Ross for Trump as "a complete misunderstanding of international trade, on their part."

In 2023, Navarro co-authored the chapter on trade for the ninth edition of the Heritage Foundation's book Mandate for Leadership, which provides the policy agenda for Project 2025. The chapter, called "The Case for Fair Trade" is part of a dueling chapter on trade policy in which Navarro argues for tariffs and trade restrictions while other authors argue for free trade. The chapter details Navarro's plans to counter China through trade policy. In the chapter, Navarro writes "America's record on trade – specifically America's chronic and ever-expanding trade deficit – says that America is the globe's biggest trade loser and a victim of unfair, unbalanced, and nonreciprocal trade". His view is that the tariff adjustments will spur the economy in the long run and yield enough revenue to pay for tax cuts.

=== Political positions ===
Navarro's political affiliations and policy positions are "hotly disputed and across the spectrum." While he lived in Massachusetts studying for his PhD at Harvard, he was a registered Democrat. When he moved to California in 1986, he was initially registered as nonpartisan and became a registered Republican in 1989. By 1991, he had again re-registered as an independent, and carried that affiliation during the 1992 San Diego mayoral election. Around this time, he still considered himself a conservative Republican. Navarro rejoined the Democratic Party in 1994 and remained a Democrat during each of his subsequent political campaigns. In 1996, while he was running for Congress, Navarro was endorsed by then-First Lady Hillary Clinton and spoke at the 1996 Democratic National Convention, saying, "I'm proud to be carrying the Clinton-Gore banner." He positioned himself as a "strong environmentalist and a progressive on social issues such as choice, gay rights, and religious freedom."

Navarro supported Hillary Clinton's presidential campaign in 2008. Navarro supported President Barack Obama's phase-out of incandescent light bulbs, the adoption of wind power, and carbon taxes in order to stop global warming. During the 2016 presidential election, Navarro described himself as "a Reagan Democrat and a Trump Democrat abandoned by my party." Despite this, Navarro was critical of Ronald Reagan's defense spending, called GDP growth during the administration a "Failure of Reaganomics" and described the "10-5-3" tax proposal as "a very large corporate subsidy." During the early stage of the Trump administration, Navarro was still known to be a Democrat, but by February 2018 he had again re-registered as a Republican. In the 2024 Republican National Convention, Navarro said "Democrats come for your kids. They are indoctrinating them with poisonous attitudes on race and gender."

=== Border adjustment tax ===
Navarro supports a tax policy called "border adjustment", which, as commonly used in the VATs of most countries, taxes all imports at the domestic rate while rebating tax on exports, essentially transforming taxes from taxes on production to taxes on consumption. In response to criticism that the border adjustment tax could hurt U.S. companies and put jobs at risk, Navarro called it "fake news".

=== Criticism of China ===
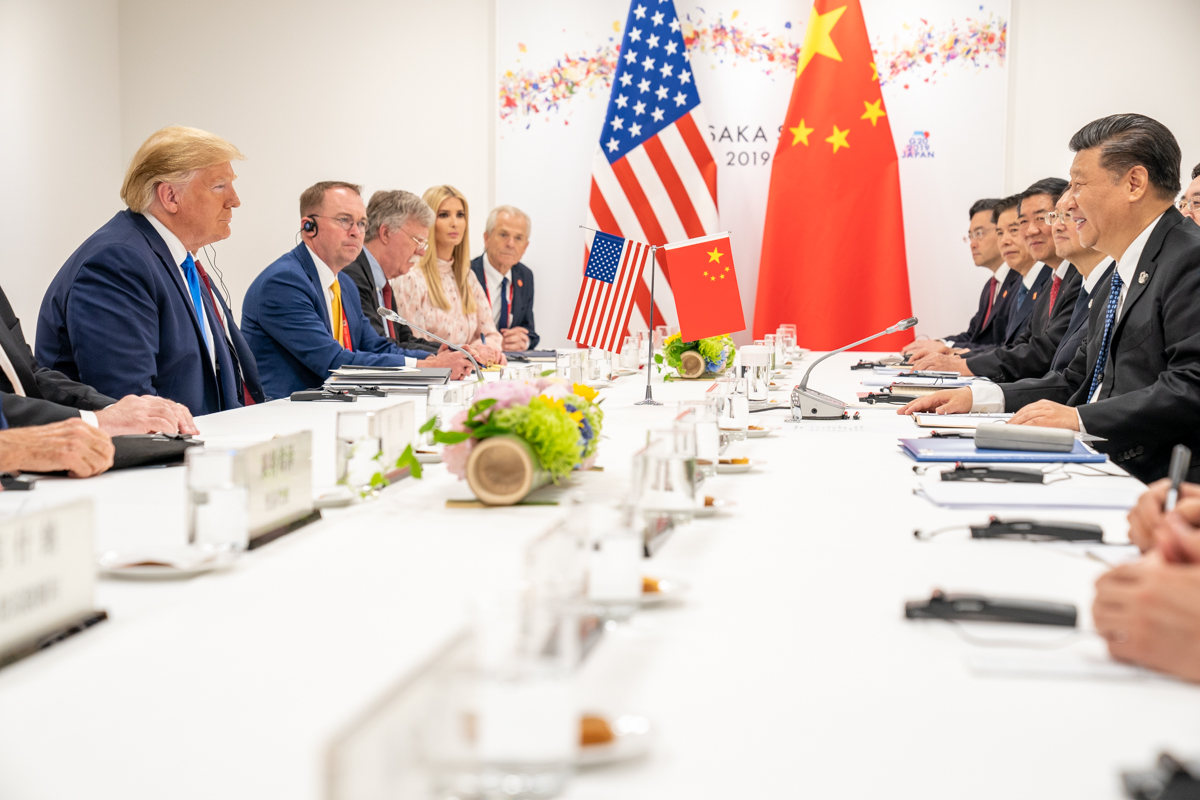
Navarro joins U.S. president Donald Trump and Chinese president Xi Jinping at their bilateral meeting, June 29, 2019.

Navarro is seen as very hawkish on China. According to The Guardian, Navarro sees China as a "despicable, parasitic, brutal, brass-knuckled, crass, callous, amoral, ruthless and totally totalitarian imperialist power that reigns over the world's leading cancer factory, its most prolific propaganda mill and the biggest police state and prison on the face of the earth". According to Politico, "Navarro is perhaps the most extreme advocate in Washington, and maybe in all of economics, for an aggressive stance toward China." According to Vox, "Aided by cartoonish and frequently offensive stereotypes of the Chinese national character, Navarro tends to believe that there is something fundamentally underhanded and evil about China, regardless of any evidence to the contrary".

In Politico's description of Navarro's book The Coming China Wars, "Navarro uses military language to refer to China's trade policies, referring to its 'conquest' of the world's export markets, which has 'vaporized literally millions of manufacturing jobs and driven down wages.' ... China's aspirations are so insatiable, he claims, that eventually there will be a clash over 'our most basic of all needs – bread, water, and air.'" Navarro has described the entry of China to the World Trade Organization as one of the United States' biggest mistakes. To respond to the threat posed to the United States, Navarro has advocated for 43% tariffs, the repudiation of trade pacts, major increases in military expenditures, and strengthened military ties with Taiwan. The New York Times notes that "a wide range of economists have warned that curtailing trade with China would damage the American economy, forcing consumers to pay higher prices for goods and services." Navarro has reportedly also encouraged Trump to enact a 25% tariff on Chinese steel imports, something that "trade experts worry... would upend global trade practices and cause countries to retaliate, potentially leading to a trade war".

Navarro has said that a large part of China's competitive advantage over the United States stems from unfair trade practices. Navarro has criticized China for pollution, poor labor standards, government subsidies, producing "contaminated, defective and cancerous" exports, currency manipulation, and theft of US intellectual property. In his 2012 documentary, Navarro said that China caused the loss of 57,000 US factories and 25 million jobs. Navarro has maintained that China manipulates its currency, and on August 5, 2019, the U.S. Treasury Department officially designated China as a "currency manipulator."

Of the more than a dozen China specialists contacted by Foreign Policy, most either did not know of Navarro or had only interacted with him briefly. Kenneth Pomeranz, University of Chicago professor of Chinese History, said that his "recollection is that [Navarro] generally avoided people who actually knew something about the country." Columnist Gordon G. Chang was the only China watcher contacted by Foreign Policy who defended Navarro, but even he noted that he disagreed with Navarro's claims of currency manipulation, opposition to the TPP, and calls for high tariffs. James McGregor, a former chairman of the American Chamber of Commerce in China, said that Navarro's books and documentary on China "have close to zero credibility with people who know the country," and are filled with "hyperbole, inaccuracies" and a "cartoonish caricature of China that he puts out." Some of Navarro's views on China fit within the mainstream, such as criticism of Chinese currency manipulation (pre-2015), concern that China's rapid ascension to the World Trade Organization harmed the Rust Belt, and criticism of China's weak environmental regulations and poor labor standards.

==== Fake expert "Ron Vara" ====
In six of his books about China, Navarro quotes a purported trade expert named "Ron Vara", whom he describes as a China hawk and former Harvard PhD doctoral student in economics. Vara makes Sinophobic remarks about China and the Chinese, such as "you've got to be nuts to eat Chinese food" and "only the Chinese can turn a leather sofa into an acid bath, a baby crib into a lethal weapon, and a cellphone battery into heart-piercing shrapnel". However, a 2019 investigation by the Chronicle of Higher Education found that no such person existed, and that "Ron Vara" (an anagram of Navarro) appeared to represent views that Navarro himself held. When he was asked about Vara by The Chronicle, Navarro admitted to making up the character, an author surrogate, and quoting him in his books.

In the wake of the disclosure, many news outlets have referred to Vara as a "fake expert" or "fake economist" (often in their headlines). Prentice Hall, the publisher of Death by China, said that it would add a disclaimer to later editions informing readers that Vara was not a real person. Economist Glenn Hubbard, who co-authored Seeds of Destruction with Navarro, said that he was not aware that Vara was fictional, and that he disapproved of Navarro attributing information to a fictional source.

In December 2019, a memo purportedly written by Ron Vara began circulating in Washington, D.C. The memo highlighted the "Keep Tariff Argument" and the use of tariffs against China a few days before implementing an additional 15% tariff on $160 billion of Chinese-made goods. Navarro later confirmed that he had written the memo. In response to the "Ron Vara" character, Ministry of Foreign Affairs of China spokesperson Hua Chunying accused Navarro of "smearing China with lies".

=== Germany ===
Navarro drew controversy when he accused Germany of using a "grossly undervalued" euro to "exploit" the rest of the European Union and the United States. Politico noted that the German government does not set the value of the euro. Economists and commentators are divided on the accuracy of Navarro's remarks. Economist Paul Krugman said that Navarro was right and wrong at the same time: "Yes, Germany in effect has an undervalued currency relative to what it would have without the euro... But does this mean that the euro as a whole is undervalued against the dollar? Probably not."

=== Manufacturing ===
Navarro argues that the decline in US manufacturing jobs is chiefly due to "unfair trade practices and bad trade deals. And if you don't believe that, just go to the booming factories in Germany, in Japan, in Korea, in China, in Malaysia, in Vietnam, in Indonesia, in Italy – every place that we're running deficits with." However, many economists attribute the decline in manufacturing jobs chiefly to automation and other innovations that allow manufacturing firms to produce more goods with fewer workers, rather than trade.

Navarro has been a proponent of strengthening the manufacturing sector's role in the national economy: "We envision a more Germany-style economy, where 20 percent of our workforce is in manufacturing. ... And we're not talking about banging tin in the back room." The New York Times notes that "experts on manufacturing ... doubt that the government can significantly increase factory employment, noting that mechanization is the major reason fewer people are working in factories."

=== Opposition to trade deals ===
Navarro has criticized the United States–South Korea Free Trade Agreement. Navarro called for the United States to leave the North American Free Trade Agreement, and tried to convince Trump to initiate a withdrawal. Working together with former AFL-CIO president, Richard Trumka, a revised NAFTA agreement was put in place during the Trump administration.

Navarro opposes the Trans-Pacific Partnership. Navarro claimed in an April 2015 op-ed, "To woo us, their spinmeisters boast the TPP will spur American exports to stimulate sorely needed economic growth. In truth, the American economy will suffer severely. This is because the TPP will hammer two main drivers of economic growth – domestic investment and 'net exports.'" Navarro said in March 2017 that TPP "would have been a 'death knell' to America's auto and vehicle parts industry that we "urgently need to bring back to full life.'"

Navarro also opposed Australian tariff exemptions; he asserted that "Australia is just killing our aluminum market," and that "what they do is they just flood our markets", despite Australia providing only 2.5% of U.S. aluminum imports. Australia ranked only 17th for exports of steel to the U.S. and eighth in exports of aluminum over the past 10 years.

=== Trade as a national security risk ===
Navarro has framed trade as a national security risk. Navarro has characterized foreign purchases of U.S. companies as a threat to national security, but according to NPR, this is "a fringe view that puts him at odds with the vast majority of economists." Dartmouth economist Douglas Irwin noted that the US government already reviews foreign purchases of companies with military or strategic value, and has on occasion rejected such deals. Irwin said that Navarro had not substantiated his claim with any evidence.

Navarro has also said that the United States has "already begun to lose control of [its] food supply chain", which according to NPR, "sounded pretty off-the-wall to a number of economists" who noted that the United States is a massive exporter of food. Dermot Hayes, an agribusiness economist at Iowa State University, described Navarro's statement as "uninformed". Navarro has called for repatriating global supply chains. According to Politico's Jacob Heilbrunn, such a move "would be enormously costly and take years to execute". Navarro criticized the outsourcing of critical materials – like the production of essential medical supplies – to China, in light of the onset of COVID-19 pandemic in 2020.

=== Trade deficits ===
Navarro is a proponent of the notion that trade deficits are bad in and of themselves, a view which is widely rejected by trade experts and economists. In a white paper co-authored with Wilbur Ross, Navarro stated, "when a country runs a trade deficit by importing more than it exports, this subtracts from growth." In a Wall Street Journal op-ed defending his views, Navarro stated, "If we are able to reduce our trade deficits through tough, smart negotiations, we should be able to increase our growth."

Harvard University economics professor Gregory Mankiw has said that Navarro's views on the trade deficit are based on the kind of mistakes that "even a freshman at the end of ec 10 knows." Tufts University professor Daniel W. Drezner said about Navarro's op-ed, "as someone who's written on this topic I could not for the life of me understand his reasoning". According to Tyler Cowen, "close to no one" in the economics profession agrees with Navarro's idea that a trade deficit is bad in and of itself. Nobel laureate Angus Deaton described Navarro's attitude on trade deficits as "an old-fashioned mercantilist position."

The Economist has described Navarro's views on the trade deficit as "dodgy economics", while the Financial Times has described them as "poor economics". Economists Scott Sumner, Olivier Blanchard, and Phil Levy have also criticized Navarro's views on the trade deficit. Dan Ikenson, director of the Cato Institute's Herbert A. Stiefel Center for Trade Policy Studies, goes so far as to call Navarro a "charlatan" and says that "99.9 per cent of respectable economists would eschew" what he says: "He says imports deduct from output, and he calls that accounting identity the 'economic growth formula'. He thinks that for every dollar we import, our GDP is reduced by a dollar. I don't know how he got his PhD at Harvard."

== Personal life ==
In 2001, Navarro married Leslie Lebon, a California architect. The couple lived in Laguna Beach, with Lebon's son from a previous marriage, while Navarro was a professor at UC Irvine. In late 2018, Lebon filed for divorce in Orange County. Their divorce became final in December 2020. At the Republican National Convention in July 2024, Navarro announced that he was engaged to Bonnie Brenner. They married at Mar-a-Lago in March 2026.

== Bibliography ==
- The Dimming of America: The Real Costs of Electric Utility Regulation (1984)
- The Policy Game (1984)
- Bill Clinton's Agenda for America (1993)
- Job Opportunities Under Clinton/Gore (with Craig Adams) (1993)
- If It's Raining in Brazil, Buy Starbucks (2001)
- When the Market Moves, Will You Be Ready? (2003)
- Principles of Economics: Business, Banking, Finance, and Your Everyday Life (2005)
- What the Best MBAs Know (2005)
- The Coming China Wars (2006)
- The Well-Timed Strategy: Managing the Business Cycle for Competitive Advantage (2006)
- Always a Winner: Finding Your Competitive Advantage in an Up and Down Economy (2009)
- Seeds of Destruction (with Glenn Hubbard) (2010)
- Death by China: Confronting the Dragon – A Global Call to Action (2011)
- Crouching Tiger: What China's Militarism Means for the World (2015)
- In Trump Time: My Journal of America's Plague Year (2021)
- Red Moon Rising: How America Will Beat China on the Final Frontier (2024)
