= Asiacentrism =

Worldview centred on or biased towards Eastern civilization

Asiacentrism (also Asiacentricity or Eastern-centrism) is a political ideology, an economic perspective, or an academic orientation with "a focus on Asia or on cultures of Asian origin." In some cases, this stance regards Asia to be either unique or superior to other regions and takes the form of ascribing to Asia ethnocentric significance or supremacy at the cost of the rest of the world. The concept is often associated with a projected Asian Century, the expected economic dominance of Asia (primarily China) in the 21st century.

== History ==
In 1902, Chinese scholar Liang Qichao remarked that Asia is "immeasurably vast and mighty", compared to a "shallow and small" Europe, as he predicted Asia to regain a powerful position in the world.

In 1988, Deng Xiaoping coined the term 'Asian Century' during a meeting with Indian PM Rajiv Gandhi.

The Trans-Pacific Partnership and subsequent withdrawal of the United States from it were viewed by some analysts as a symbol of declining Western hegemony.

Some commentators have cited the effective response to the COVID-19 pandemic in Asia as a sign of superiority of Asia. Indian commentator Parag Khanna and UK politician David Howell noted that Asian societies evolved to technocratic governments which would be better at problem solving and provide more stability.

In 2021, 'Asiacentrism' was added to the Oxford English Dictionary.

== Economics ==
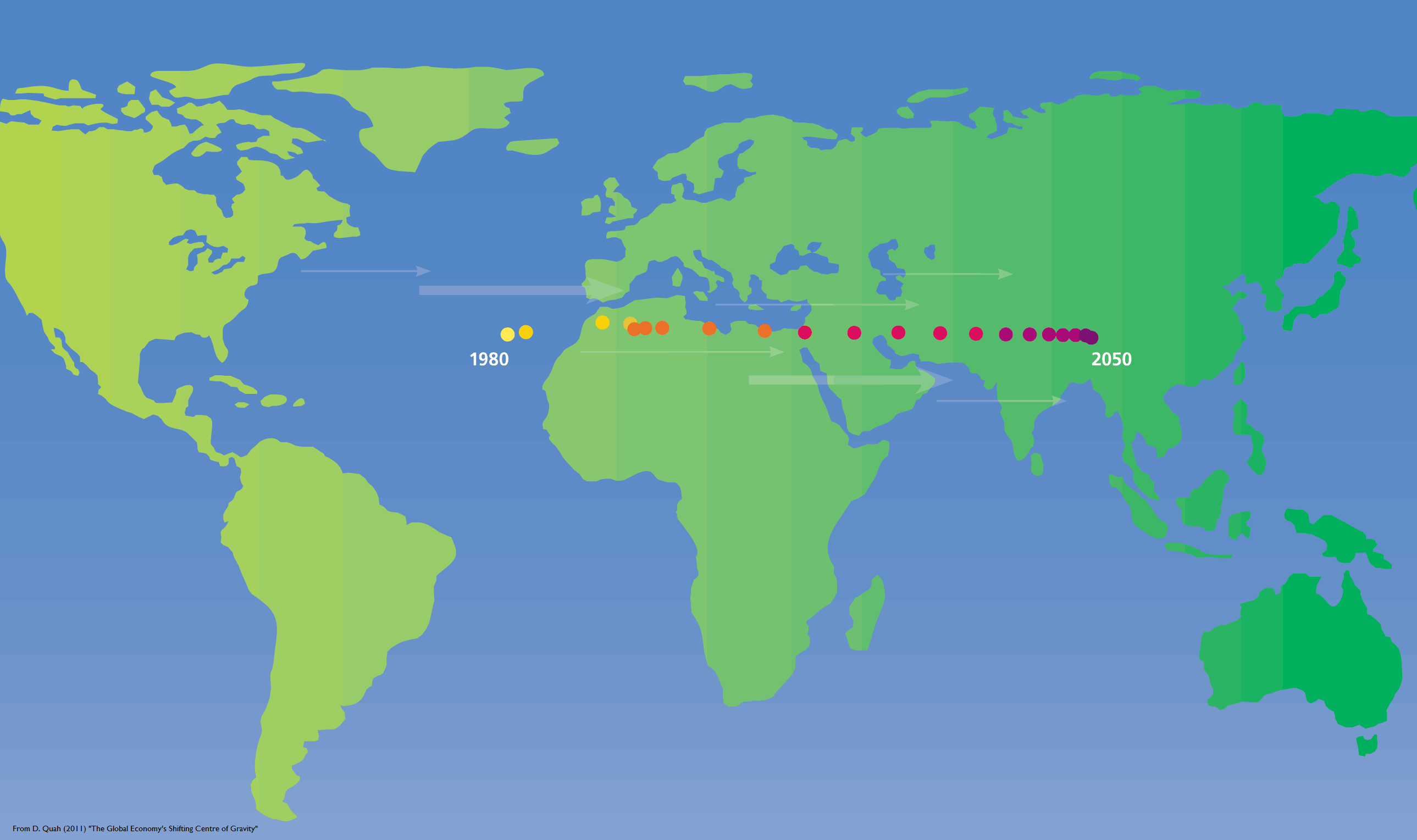
The World's Economic Centre of Gravity 1980–2050

It is projected that the world's economic center of gravity will move back to Asia, between India and China by 2050, spurred by the economic growth of East Asian economies. Historically, the economic center of gravity is estimated to have been in what is nowadays northern Pakistan in the 11th century then having shifted to Bengal by 16th century and finally having moved west until the 1980s.

The combined GDP of Asia is also projected to surpass that of the rest of the world around 2020, a position which the continent had lost in the 19th century.

According to a McKinsey Global Institute report, Asia is entering the post-2019 era as 'the word's new majority,' with Asia "accounting for more than half of the world's key economic metrics."

== Asian American studies ==
Paul Wong, Meera Manvi, and Takeo Hirota Wong proposed "Asiacentrism" in the 1995 special issue of Amerasia Journal on "Thinking Theory in Asian American Studies." They envisioned Asiacentrism both as a critique of hegemonic Eurocentrism in theory building in the humanities and social sciences and as a post-Orientalist epistemological paradigm in Asian American Studies. There is a need to tap into Asian traditions of thought for analyzing Asian American behaviors and for advancing global knowledge in the human interest. The objective is to explore a common core of Asian worldviews and values that overlap in their influence on particular regions, nations, and communities. In their view, Asiacentrism may be able to offer an alternative Asian perspective grounded in an awareness of the dynamics of a postcolonial world.

It is possible to argue that Asian American Studies has, since its inception, permitted itself to be conceptually incarcerated in a hegemonic Eurocentric culture and world view. Not only is the English language serving as the lingua franca of Asian American Studies, but it is easily evident that many scholars in Asian American Studies do not regard the acquisition of at least one Asian language, as a second language, an important part of their training, thereby curtailing their communicative and research competence with the majority of Asian Americans, whose primary language is not English. While much scholarship has been devoted to "... present voices from our (Asian American) past which were never silent, but often ignored, minimalized, and marginalized by traditional historical accounts of the United States," there has been no serious attempt to contextualize this scholarship in what may be termed the "deep structure" of a shared Asiacentric perspective.

Wong, Manvi, and Wong also submitted that Asiacentrism can be a paradigmatic way of integrating Asian American Studies and Asian Studies by acknowledging the colonial histories, recognizing the common interests, and recovering the cultural roots. They stressed that Asian American Studies should play an important role in decolonizing Asian Studies by interrogating its Eurocentric legacies.

Scholars committed to the development of an Asiacentric paradigm face a challenge no less daunting than the Afrocentrists. The Euro-American colonial history in Asia has obviously left a deep imprint on Asian Studies Scholarship…. In theorizing about Asian cultures and societies, the Eurocentric view has only been subjected to serious critiques in recent decades. By proposing the development of an Asiacentric perspective, we are consciously suggesting that Asian American Studies also has a role to play in a field of Asian Studies stripped of its colonial legacy. Interestingly, the Pan-Africanists have always recognized the common interests and the unity of African American Studies and African Studies in decolonization and the recovery of roots.

== Communication studies ==
Yoshitaka Miike, Professor of Intercultural Communication at the University of Hawaii at Hilo, is considered as the founding theorist of Asiacentricity in the discipline of communication. He was inspired by Molefi Kete Asante, who is one of the early pioneers in the fields of intercultural and interracial communication. Asante's Afrocentric idea as well as Wong, Manvi, and Wong's Asiacentric reflection led Miike to coin the term Asiacentricity and outline an Asiacentric project in culture and communication studies in 2003. He was later influenced by Maulana Karenga’s Kawaida philosophy, which emphasizes the role of culture for self-understanding and self-assertion and the importance of ethics for human freedom and flourishing.

Miike defined Asiacentricity as "the thought and practice of centering Asians as subjects and agents and Asian cultures as reflective resources in seeing and shaping the Asian world." According to him, Asiacentricity "insists on revivifying and revitalizing diverse Asian cultural traditions as theoretical resources in order to capture Asians as subjects and actors of their own cultural realities rather than objects and spectators in the lived experiences of others."

Simply put, Asiacentricity is the idea of centering, not marginalizing, Asian languages, religions/philosophies, and histories in theory-making and storytelling about Asian communicative life. Asiacentricity aims to encourage careful and critical engagements of Asian communicators with their own cultural traditions for self-understanding, self-expression, communal development, and cross-cultural dialogue. Intraculturally, it helps Asians embrace the positive elements of their cultural heritage and transform negative practices according to their ethical ideals. Interculturally, it helps Asians find "a place to stand," so to speak, and provides the basis of equality and mutuality in the global community.

Borrowing from Daisetz Suzuki's words, Miike stated that Asiacentricity is essentially "the idea of being deep and open," that is, the idea of being rooted in our own culture and, at the same time, open to other cultures. He differentiated Asiacentricity as a particularist position from Asiacentrism as a universalist ideology and maintained that Asiacentricity is a legitimate culture-centric approach to cultural Asia and people of Asian descent, while Asiacentrism is an ethnocentric approach to non-Asian worlds and people of non-Asian heritage. In Miike's conceptualization, therefore, Asiacentrists are not cultural chauvinists and separatists.

Asiacentricity is neither a hegemonic Asiacentrism nor an Asian version of ethnocentric Eurocentrism. Asiacentricity does not present the Asian worldview as the only universal frame of reference and impose it on non-Asians. Hence, Asiacentrists should be alert to Park's (2001) warning: "An idea is not good merely because it is old or because it is new. It is not necessarily good because it is an Eastern idea or a Western idea, or just because it is ours" (p. 8). Asiacentrists thus should not deny the value of other non-Asiacentric perspectives on Asians. Nevertheless, they must reject the hegemonic ideology that non-Asiacentric theoretical standpoints are superior to Asiacentric ones and therefore can grossly neglect the latter in the discussion and discourse surrounding Asian people and phenomena. They must reject the hegemonic ideology that the Asian version of humanity can be judged solely from the Eurocentric vision of humanity.

Miike identified six dimensions of Asiacentricity: (1) an assertion of Asians as subjects and agents; (2) the centrality of the collective and humanistic interests of Asia and Asians in the process of knowledge reconstruction about the Asian world; (3) the placement of Asian cultural values and ideals at the center of inquiry into Asian thought and action; (4) the groundedness in Asian historical experiences; (5) an Asian theoretical orientation to data; and (6) an Asian ethical critique and corrective of the dislocation and displacement of Asian people and phenomena.

In Miike's comprehensive outline, Asiacentricity (1) generates theoretical knowledge that corresponds to Asian communication discourse, (2) focuses on the multiplicity and complexity of Asian communicative experience, (3) reflexively constitutes and critically transforms Asian communication discourse, (4) theorizes how common aspects of humanity are expressed and understood in Asian cultural particularities, and (5) critiques Eurocentric biases in theory and research and helps Asian researchers overcome academic dependency.

Miike's contention is that there has been the established hierarchical relationship between "Western theories" and "non-Western texts" in Eurocentric scholarship, where non-Western cultures remain as peripheral targets of data analysis and rhetorical criticism and fail to emerge as central resources of theoretical insight and humanistic inspiration. Miike thus insisted that Asiacentric scholarship reconsider Asian cultures as "theories for knowledge reconstruction," not as "texts for knowledge deconstruction." Such an Asiacentric approach, according to him, would make it possible for both Asian and non-Asian researchers to theorize as Asians speak in Asian languages, as Asians are influenced by Asian religious-philosophical worldviews, as Asians struggle to live in Asian historical experiences, and as Asians feel ethically good and aesthetically beautiful.

For the purpose of elucidating the psychology of Asian communicators and enunciating the dynamics of Asian communication, therefore, Asiacentrists ought to revalorize (a) Asian words as key concepts and their etymologies as cultural outlooks and instructive insights, (b) Asian religious-philosophical teachings as behavioral principles and codes of ethics, (c) Asian histories as multiple layers of contextualization and recurrent patterns of continuity and change, and (d) Asian aesthetics as analytical frameworks for space-time arrangement, nonverbal performance, and emotional pleasure.

Miike also synthesized a large body of literature in the field of Asian communication theory while paying homage to such pioneers as Anantha Babbili, Guo-Ming Chen, Godwin C. Chu, Wimal Dissanayake, D. Shelton A. Gunaratne, Satoshi Ishii, Young Yun Kim, D. Lawrence Kincaid, Hamid Mowlana, Louis Nordstrom, Robert T. Oliver, Tulsi B. Saral, Robert Shuter, K. S. Sitaram, William J. Starosta, Majid Tehranian, Muneo Yoshikawa, and June Ock Yum. He urged Asiacentric research to overcome "comparative Eurocentrism" and direct more attention to common insights gained from non-Eurocentric comparisons. In his opinion, five types of alternative non-Eurocentric comparisons can enlarge the theoretical horizons of Asian communication research: (1) continent-diaspora comparisons; (2) within-region comparisons; (3) between-region comparisons; (4) diachronic comparisons; and (5) co-cultural domestic comparisons.

Asiacentric studies of South Asia, Southeast Asia, and West Asia are underrepresented in the current literature. These regions are at the crossroads of Asian civilizations, offering rich historical insights into Asian intercultural exchanges and multicultural co-existence. Future theorizing and research on South Asia, Southeast Asia, and West Asia from Asiacentric vantage points will not only enhance an understanding of cultural dynamics in these areas but also enunciate Asian models of intercultural dialogue and multicultural society.

Miike asserted that humanity is most deeply felt not through universal abstractions but through linguistic and cultural particularities, and that human commonalities in their full distinctiveness must be theorized within, not outside, cultural particularities for mutual understanding across cultures. He thus concluded: Asiacentricity "substantiates the content of humanity and possibly enhances the vision of humanity." Ultimately, Asiacentricity "promotes an appreciation of humanity despite differences and because of differences."

== See also ==
- American Century (20th century onwards)
- Britain's Imperial Century (1815–1914)
- Indian Century (21st century)
- Chinese Century (21st century)
- Afrocentrism
- Anglocentrism
- (Pan-)Asianism
- Asian pride
- Culture of Asia
- Eurocentrism
- Americentrism
- Greater India
- Indocentrism
- Sinocentrism
- Sinosphere
- China's peaceful rise
- Pax Sinica
- Four Asian Tigers
- Tiger Cub Economies
- Koreacentrism
- Greater East Asia Co-Prosperity Sphere
