= Debbie Dougherty =

Communications professor

Academic background
- Education: University of Nebraska–Lincoln
- Thesis: Negotiating and cultivating standpoints : an examination of women's and men's dialogue about sexual harassment (2000)

Debbie S. Dougherty is a professor in the Department of Communication at the University of Missouri. She is the former editor-in-chief of the Journal of Applied Communication Research.

== Education and career ==
Dougherty received her B.A. at California Polytechnic State University, San Luis Obispo in 1990. She has an M.A. from the University of the Pacific. After her 1992 graduation, Dougherty continued to teach and coach at University of the Pacific until 1995. She received her Ph.D. in Communication at the University of Nebraska–Lincoln in 2000. She has been a professor at the University of Missouri since 2014.

From 2018 to 2020 Dougherty served as editor for the Journal of Applied Communication Research.

From July of 2020 to December of 2020 Dougherty served as a cultural competence training developer in the US army, where her role was to integrate organizational culture.

== Research ==
Dougherty's research focuses on the relationship between power and work, sexual harassment as a cultural phenomenon, and social class and communication. She speaks in the media about harassment policies, and institutional reviews of research plans.

== Selected publications ==
- Dougherty, Debbie S.; Drumheller, Kristina (2006). "Sensemaking and Emotions in Organizations: Accounting for Emotions in a Rational(ized) Context". Communication Studies. 57 (2): 215–238. doi:10.1080/10510970600667030. ISSN 1051-0974. S2CID 2722656.
- Dougherty, Debbie S.; Swartz, Omar (2011). The Reluctant Farmer: An Exploration of Work, Social Class & the Production of Food. Troubador Publishing Ltd. ISBN 978-1-84876-384-5.
- Dougherty, Debbie S. (2017-05-31). "The Omissions That Make So Many Sexual Harassment Policies Ineffective". Harvard Business Review. ISSN 0017-8012.
- Dougherty, Debbie S. (2022). Sexual Harassment in Organizational Culture: A Transformative Approach. Cognella Academic Publishing. ISBN 978-1-5165-8635-6.

== Awards and honors ==
In 2019 Dougherty received the Gerald Philips National Communication Association Applied Communication Award from the National Communication Association and the Kay Award from the Central States Communication Association.
