= Robert M. Shuter =

American intercultural communication scholar (born 1946)

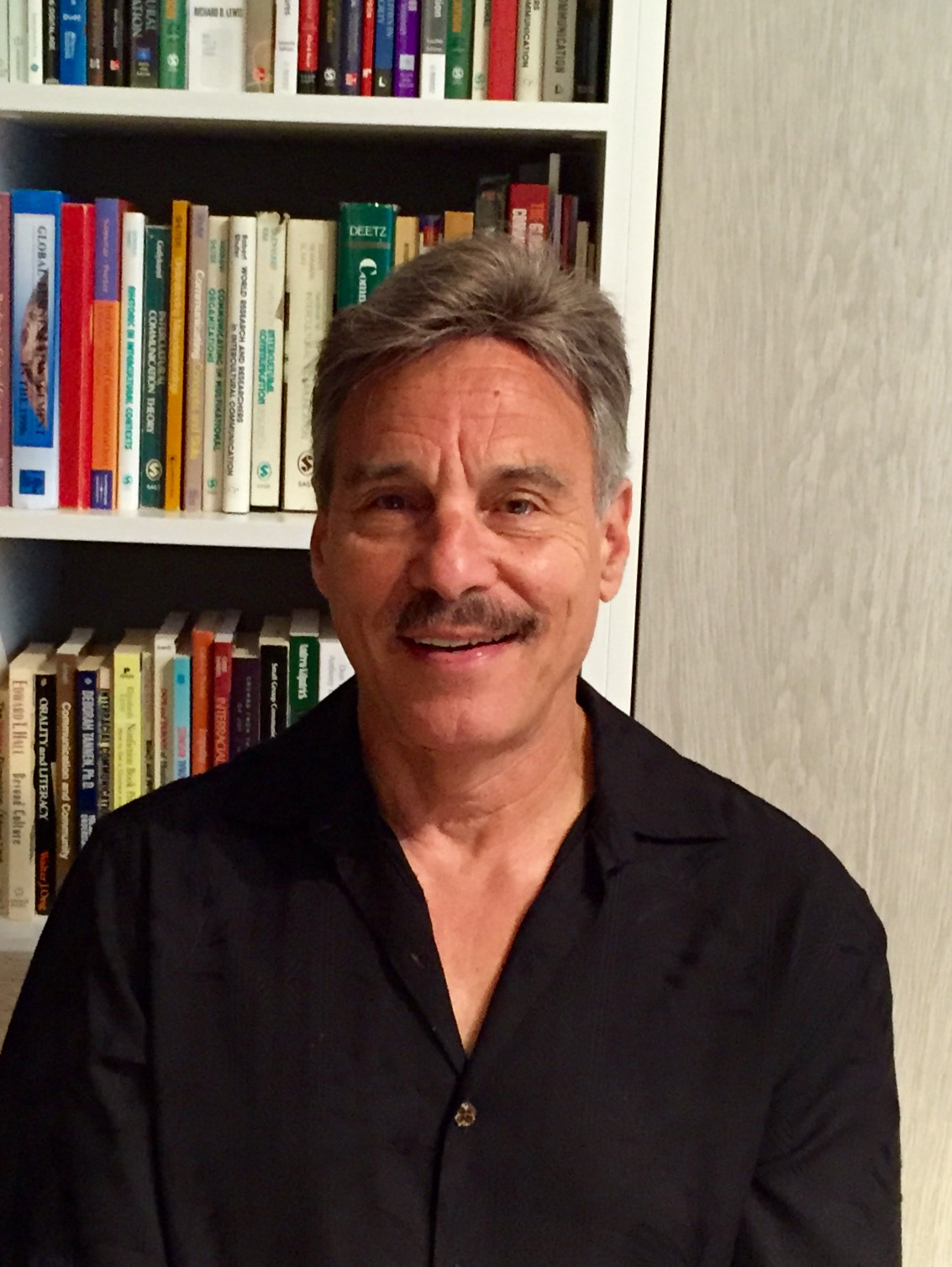
- Born: 14 July 1946; New York, United States
- Died: 4 May 2021 (aged 74); Illinois, United States
- Known for: Intercultural communication research Intercultural new media studies Intracultural communication theory Multinational organizational theory
- Awards: Fulbright Specialist Award, 2015

Academic background
- Education: Loyola University Chicago; Northwestern University

Academic work
- Discipline: Intercultural communication
- Institutions: Hugh Downs School of Human Communication at Arizona State University, Diedrich School of Communication at Marquette University

Dr. Robert Martin Shuter (July 14, 1946, in New York – May 4, 2021, in Chicago) was an American author, academic, and consultant specializing in intercultural communication. He was Research Professor at the Hugh Downs School of Human Communication at Arizona State University and Professor Emeritus at the Diederich College of Communication at Marquette University, where he taught for 41 years and chaired the Department of Communication Studies for 29 years.

== Education and career overview ==
Shuter commenced collegiate studies at Loyola University, where he received a Bachelor of Science degree in communication in 1969. He earned his master's degree and doctoral degrees in communication from Northwestern University in 1971 and 1973, respectively, and after completing his doctorate began what would be a 41-year-long professorial career at Marquette University.

He became Chairperson of the Department of Communication Studies after just one year at Marquette, a position he held for a total of 29 years between 1974–1980 and 1987–2010. He helped bolster the department's reputation through several methods, including recruitment of outstanding scholars, improvement of the curriculum, and expansion of the graduate program. His Marquette colleague Dr. Lynn Turner credits him for “the very existence of the communication studies program.”

Shuter taught a variety of courses at Marquette which, according to Dr. Steve Goldzwig, “challenged his students to learn deeply,” as well as improve “their understanding, empathy and care for others.”

During his career at Marquette, Shuter served as Visiting Professor and Visiting Lecturer at several research universities, including the Kellogg School of Business at Northwestern University, Uppsala University School of Business in Sweden, the Stern School of Business at New York University, the International Academy of Business in Denmark, and the Marshall School of Business at the University of Southern California. Now Research Professor at the Hugh Downs School of Human Communication at Arizona State University, he is also Professor Emeritus at Marquette.

He presented more than seventy papers at juried conferences. Additionally, he authored or co-authored over eighty publications, including books, book chapters, and scholarly articles in major peer-reviewed journals, and his work has been widely cited in both popular and scholarly publications. He served on the editorial board of a dozen national and international journals, was a guest editor for multiple national and international journals, and held leadership positions in major national and international academic associations such as the International and Intercultural Communication Division of the National Communication Association and the Intercultural Communication Division of the International Communication Association.

== Early work: 1970s-1980s ==
Shuter was an early contributor to the field of intercultural communication (ICC). In the 1970s and 1980s, Shuter established an international reputation as an expert in nonverbal communication and culture, particularly in the ways proxemics, tactility, and gesticulation function in different countries. To enhance his research, he interacted with the cultures at the heart of his investigations, traveling extensively throughout Europe, East Asia, and Latin America. He published articles in leading communication and psychology journals, including the Journal of Communication, Communication Monographs, Journal of Social Psychology, Journal of Applied Communication Research, and Management Communication Quarterly. One of his most cited articles, “Proxemics and tactility in Latin America,” was published in the Journal of Communication in 1976.

During this time period, he also contributed to the scholarship of “subculture,” later coining the term "co-culture" as a replacement for “subculture” in his 1990 article “The Centrality of Culture.” This substitution of “co-culture” for “sub-culture” helped ensure that cultural groups within societies were viewed as co-equals. He published a number of articles on race and communication in major journals such as the Journal of Social Psychology, Journal of Communication, and Management Communication Quarterly, which established his position as a scholar on race, ethnicity, and communication.

Shuter founded the Center for Intercultural Communication in the 1970s and served as its director through the 1970s and 1980s. The center produced the first compendium of worldwide researchers and research in intercultural communication, titled World Researchers and Research in Intercultural Communication, which was published in 1985.

An early leader in academic associations in communication, Dr. Shuter served in 1979 as Chair of the Commission on International and Intercultural Communication (IIC) for the National Communication Association (NCA) and helped transition the field of Intercultural Communication from a commission within the National Communication Association to a full division. He was also a leader in the Intercultural Communication Division of the International Communication Association. Between 2008 and 2011, he served as Vice Chair Elect, Vice Chair and Chair of the International Communication Division of the National Communication Association.

== Theoretical contributions (1990s) ==
=== Intracultural communication theory ===
Shuter created intracultural communication theory in 1990, presenting it in his article “The Centrality of Culture” in the Southern Communication Journal. His work intersected and built upon research and theories from noted scholars such as Edward T. Hall and Robert T Oliver. Later communication theories such as Asiacentrism drew in part from Shuter's research. Dr. Yoshitaka Miike, a scholar in intercultural communication and creator of the term Asiacentricity, called Shuter's writings on intracultural communication “extremely important,” and commented that they “urge the discipline of communication in general, and the field of intercultural communication in particular, to reconsider the place and role of culture in human communication research and proposes a new and alternative model of theorizing communication from cross-cultural and intercultural perspectives.”

=== Multinational organizational theory ===
Shuter's investigations helped develop multinational organizational communication as a research perspective and theoretical framework, one which explores how national culture and co-culture impact internal and external organizational communication. His earliest research in this area was presented in his article "The International Marketplace" (which appeared in the Handbook of International and Intercultural Communication) in which he articulated a framework for investigating and theorizing about the role of national culture and co-culture in organizational communication studies. His articles on race and workplace communication, with Lynn Turner, continued this line of research. He edited a book in this area with Richard Wiseman, Communicating in Multinational Organizations (1994, Sage).

== Intercultural new media studies (2000s) ==
Shuter founded intercultural new media studies (INMS), a communication sub-discipline which explores how new media technologies affect intercultural communication and “investigates new digital theories of intercultural contact as well as refines and expands twentieth-century intercultural communication theories, examining their salience in a digital world.” As part of this sub-discipline, he led a study on “textiquettes,” the results of which were published in a 2010 article in the Journal of Intercultural Communication Research. This research was later featured in the Chicago Tribune and highlighted in the National Communication Association’s Comm365 Project, a publication which commemorated the 100th anniversary of the NCA.

He also edited a special 2011 forum on new media across cultures for the Journal of International and Intercultural Communication as well as a special 2012 issue on Intercultural New Media Studies for the Journal of Intercultural Communication Research. These special issues and articles are among the most viewed issues and articles in the history of these two leading communication journals.

He published his 2012 article on INMS—“Intercultural New Media Studies: The Next Frontier in Intercultural Communication”—in the Journal Intercultural Communication Research. The article is the most read in the journal's history, with over 7800 views. The article established INMS as a field which “refines and expands twentieth-century intercultural communication theories, examining their salience in a digital world” and challenged communication researchers to investigate the impact of new media on intercultural communication. Intercultural new media studies provides a theoretical framework for exploring (1) the influence of culture on the social uses of new media, (2) how new media changes culture, and (3) how new media affects extant intercultural communication theories, most of which were developed in the twentieth century and grounded in a face-to-face paradigm.

To generate research on culture and new media, Shuter developed the independent Center for Intercultural New Media Research in 2011, which he has directed since its inception. The center is the anchor for intercultural new media studies and boasts more than 300 Research Associates in 46 countries, representing more than 200 universities. Described as a “think tank and clearinghouse for scholarship,” the Center focuses “on the impact of new media on human communication across cultures, nations, and world regions” and finds inspiration and possibilities in the distinct potential of new media to enlarge and enrich intercultural contact and dialogue.

Shuter was selected in 2013 by the National Endowment for the Humanities to serve as grants panel reviewer for the social science program of the research division.

In 2015 Shuter served as a Fulbright Scholar via a Specialist Award, bringing his experience in intercultural new media studies and multinational organizational communication to Hong Kong Baptist University School of Communication. He worked with students, faculty, and administrators to familiarize them with intercultural new media studies and integrate it into their curriculum and research agendas. He also convened meetings of the Hong Kong chapter of the Center for Intercultual New Media Research to initiate additional new media studies focusing on Hong Kong and mainland China.

== Global consultant ==
Shuter was also a “researcher who consults,” having noted that “[i]t’s what I do as a professor that makes me valuable as a consultant. And I’m only as strong as the last research I’ve done.” He used his knowledge of Scandinavian business culture and communication to work as a consultant for Scandinavian corporations and was invited to speak to organizations and companies across the world. Throughout the 1980s, 1990s, and 2000s, Shuter also provided customized consultations on multinational organizational communication issues to international corporations throughout Asia, Europe, and the United States, including Asea Brown Boveri, Atlas Copco, Danfoss, Novo Nordisk, Siemens, and Tetra Pak.

In addition to global consulting, Shuter provided diversity consultations on race, ethnicity, and gender to Fortune 500 companies in the United States. Shuter's clients included, among many others, American Family Insurance, the American Gas Association, General Electric Medical Systems, Johnson Wax, Miller Brewing, Snap-On Tools, St. Jude Medical, and the U.S. Forest Service.

== Media and popular press ==
From 1979 to 1980 Shuter directed, wrote, produced, and hosted the Shuter-Herzberg Edition, a live weekly prime time show on WMUR-PBS in Milwaukee that focused on cross-cultural communication issues. He also made appearances on national television, addressing the topic of foreign corporations operating in the U.S. on Wall $treet Week With Louis Rukeyser and also appeared as a special guest on the Financial News Network’s Marketwatch.

Shuter wrote, produced, directed, and conducted on-camera interviews for Life or Death?, a half-hour documentary on health communication that aired on the Milwaukee NBC affiliate in 1980. He later served as an Associate Producer and Academic/Creative Consultant for CBS Network's Specials Division.

Shuter wrote articles appearing in the New York Times, Wall Street Journal, Crain's Chicago Business, Milwaukee Journal Sentinel, International Management, and Huffington Post, and was a columnist for the Swedish-American publication Currents from 1998 to 2001.

== Published works ==
=== Books ===
- Shuter, R., & Wiseman, R. L. (Eds.). (1994). Communicating in multinational organizations (International and Intercultural Communication Annual, Vol. 18). Thousand Oaks, CA: Sage.
- Shuter, R. (1985). World researchers and research in intercultural communication. Chicago, IL: Culture Publications.
- Shuter, R. (1984). Communicating: Concepts and skills. New York, NY: Holt, Rinehart & Winston.
- Shuter, R. (1979). Understanding misunderstandings: Exploring interpersonal communication. New York, NY: Harper & Row.

=== Selected guest-edited scholarly journals ===
- Shuter, R. (2012). Intercultural new media studies [Special issue]. Journal of Intercultural Communication Research, 4(3).
- Shuter, R. (2012). Intercultural new media research [Special issue]. China Media Research, 8(4).
- Shuter, R. (2011). New media, culture, and communication [Special forum]. Journal of International and Intercultural Communication, 4(4).
- Shuter, R. (1990). Patterns of intracultural communication [Special issue]. Southern Communication Journal, 55(3).

=== Selected articles in peer-reviewed journals ===
- Shuter, R., & Kurylo, A. (2015). Intercultural new media research for the 21st century. International Journal of Interactive Communication Systems and Technologies, 5(1), 4–9.
- Shuter, R., & Chattopadhyay, S. (2014). A cross-national study of cultural values and contextual norms of mobile phone activity. Journal of Multicultural Discourses, 9(1), 61–70.
- Shuter, R. (2012). Intercultural new media studies: The next frontier in intercultural communication. Journal of Intercultural Communication Research, 41(3), 119–137.
- Shuter, R. (2012). Research and pedagogy on intercultural new media studies. China Media Research, 8(4), 1–5.
- Shuter, R. (2011). New media, culture, and communication: Prospect and promise. Journal of International and Intercultural Communication, 4(4), 241–245.
- Shuter, R., & Chattopadhyay, S. (2010). Emerging interpersonal norms of text messaging in India and the United States. Journal of Intercultural Communication Research, 39(2), 123–147.
- Turner, L. H., & Shuter, R. (2004). African American and European American women's vision of workplace conflict: A metaphorical analysis. Howard Journal of Communications, 15(3), 169–183.
- Shuter, R., & Turner, L. H. (1997). African American and European American women: Workplace perceptions of conflict communication. Management Communication Quarterly, 11(1), 74–96.
- Shuter, R. (1990). The centrality of culture. Southern Communication Journal, 55(3), 237–249.
- Shuter, R. (1982). Initial interaction of American Blacks and Whites in interracial and intraracial dyads. Journal of Social Psychology, 117(1), 45–52.
- Shuter, R. (1979). The Dap in the military: Hand-to-hand communication. Journal of Communication, 29(1), 136–142.
- Shuter, R. (1979). A study of nonverbal communication among Jews and Protestants. Journal of Social Psychology, 109(1), 31–41.
- Shuter, R. (1977). A field study of nonverbal communication in Germany, Italy, and the United States. Communication Monographs. 44(4), 298–305.
- Shuter, R. (1977). Cross-cultural small group research: A review, an analysis, and a theory. International Journal of Intercultural Relations, 1(1), 90–104.
- Shuter, R. (1976). Proxemics and tactility in Latin America. Journal of Communication, 26(3), 46- 52.
- Shuter, R. (1976). The promise of participant observation research. Journal of Applied Communication Research, 4(1), 1–7.
- Shuter, R. (1975). The alternative institution: A small group study of environmental influence on sex-role interaction style. Today's Speech, 23(3), 45–50.
- Shuter, R. (1973). Free-school norms: A case study in external influence on internal group development. Journal of Applied Behavioral Science, 9(2/3), 281–293.

=== Selected articles in peer-reviewed books ===
- Shuter, R. (2018). New media and intercultural communication. In Y. Y. Kim (Ed.), The international encyclopedia of intercultural communication (Vol. 3, pp. 1609–1617). Hoboken, NJ: Wiley-Blackwell.
- Shuter, R. (2017). Intercultural new media studies: Still the new frontier in intercultural communication. In L. Chen (Ed.), Handbooks of communication science: Vol. 9. Intercultural communication (pp. 617–636). Berlin, Germany: Mouton de Gruyter.
- Shuter, R. (2012). Gender and new media use in India: A critical intercultural analysis. In P. H. Cheong, J. N. Martin, & L. P. Macfadyen (Eds.), New media and intercultural communication: Identity, community, and politics (pp. 248–262). New York, NY: Peter Lang.
- Shuter, R. (1999). The cultures of rhetoric. In A. Gonzalez & D. V. Tanno (Eds.), International and intercultural communication annual: Vol. 22. Rhetoric in intercultural contexts (pp. 11–18). Thousand Oaks, CA: Sage.
- Shuter, R., & Wiseman, R. L. (1994). Communication in multinational organizations: Conceptual, theoretical, and practical issues. In R. L. Wiseman & R. Shuter (Eds.), International and intercultural communication annual: Vol. 18. Communicating in multinational organizations (pp. 3–11). Thousand Oaks, CA: Sage.
- Shuter, R. (1989). The international marketplace. In M. K. Asante & W. B. Gudykunst (Eds.), Handbook of international and intercultural communication (pp. 392–406). Newbury Park, CA: Sage.
- Shuter, R. (1984). Naturalistic field research. In W. B. Gudykunst & Y. Y. Kim (Eds.), International and intercultural communication annual: Vol. 8. Methods for intercultural communication research (pp. 195–204). Beverly Hills, CA: Sage.
- Shuter, R. (1979). Gaze behavior in interracial and intraracial interactions. In N. C. Jain (Ed.), International and intercultural communication annual (Vol. 5, pp. 48–55). Falls Church, VA: Speech Communication Association.
- Shuter, R. (1979). Still photography: An approach to intercultural communication. In M. K. Asante, E. Newmark, & C. A. Blake (Eds.), Handbook of intercultural communication (pp. 253–261). Beverly Hills, CA: Sage.

=== Selected book chapters ===
- Shuter, R. (2016). Foreword. In A Kurylo & D. Dumova (Eds.), Social networking: Redefining communication in the digital age (pp. xi–xii). Madison, NJ: Fairleigh Dickenson University Press.
- Shuter, R. (2015). The promise of intercultural new media studies. In L. A. Samovar, R. E. Porter, E. R. McDaniel, & C. S. Roy (Eds.), Intercultural communication: A reader (14th ed., pp. 472–481). Boston, MA: Cengage Learning.
- Shuter, R. (2014). The centrality of culture in the 20th and 21st centuries. In M. K. Asante, Y. Miike, & J. Yin (Eds.), The global intercultural communication reader (2nd ed., pp. 48–57). New York, NY: Routledge.
- Shuter, R. (2008). The centrality of culture: An intracultural perspective. In M. K. Asante, Y. Miike, & J. Yin (Eds.), The global intercultural communication reader (pp. 35–43). New York, NY: Routledge.
- Shuter, R. (2002). Cross-national small group research: Prospect and promise. In L. R. Frey (Ed.), New directions in group communication (pp. 273–284). Thousand Oaks, CA: Sage.
- Shuter, R. (2000). Ethics, culture, and communication: An intercultural perspective. In L. A. Samovar & R. E. Porter (Eds.), Intercultural communication: A reader (9th ed., pp. 443–450). Belmont, CA: Wadsworth (Reprinted in 10th ed., 2003, pp. 449–455).
- Shuter, R. (2000). Ethical issues in global communication. In W. J. Starosta & G.-M. Chen (Eds.), Communication and global society (pp. 63–77). New York, NY: Peter Lang.
- Shuter, R. (1998). The centrality of culture revisited. In J. N. Martin, T. K. Nakayama, & L. A. Flores (Eds.), Readings in cultural contexts (pp. 15–25). Mountain View, CA: Mayfield.
- Shuter, R. (1990). The global reach: Headquarters and foreign subsidiary communication. In R. T. Moran (Ed.), Global business management in the 1990s (pp. 377–385). Washington, DC: Beacham.
- Shuter, R. (1985). The Hmong of Laos: Orality, communication, and acculturation. In L. A. Samovar & R. E. Porter (Eds.), Intercultural communication: A reader (4th ed., pp. 102–109). Belmont, CA: Wadsworth (Reprinted in 6th ed., 1991, pp. 270–276, and 7th. ed, 1994, pp. 213–219).
- Shuter, R. (1979). Research on intercultural communication: Lost, stymied, or strayed? In W. G. Davey (Ed.), Intercultural theory and practice: Perspectives on education, training and research (pp. 41–43). Washington, DC: Society for Intercultural Education Training and Research.

=== Selected publications in periodicals ===
- Shuter, R. (October 10, 2013). Pay or perish. Huffington Post
- Shuter, R. (September 16, 2012). What America could learn from Scandinavia. Milwaukee Journal Sentinel, Crossroads
- Shuter, R. (May 18, 2010). Management theory S: Scandinavian alternative to excessive executive pay. Currents, p. 7.
- Shuter, R. (1998–2001). Shuter's blunder of the month (cross-cultural communication column). Currents: Swedish American Chamber of Commerce, USA.
- Shuter, R. (1995). Global communication. Global Trends, pp. 3–8.
- Shuter, R. (1991). Foreign corporations in the U.S. In D. Asman (Ed.), Wall Street Journal on Management. New York, NY: Doubleday.
- Shuter, R. (November 6, 1986). When the boss is a stranger in a familiar land. Wall Street Journal, p. 63.
- Shuter, R. (January 7, 1985). Vive la difference applies to international business relations, too. Crain's Chicago Business, p. 8.
- Shuter, R. (1985). Assignment America: Foreign managers beware! International Management, pp. 93–96.
- Shuter, R. (September 2, 1984). Know the local rules of the game. New York Times, p. F2.
