= Eurocentrism =

Worldview centred on or biased towards Western civilization

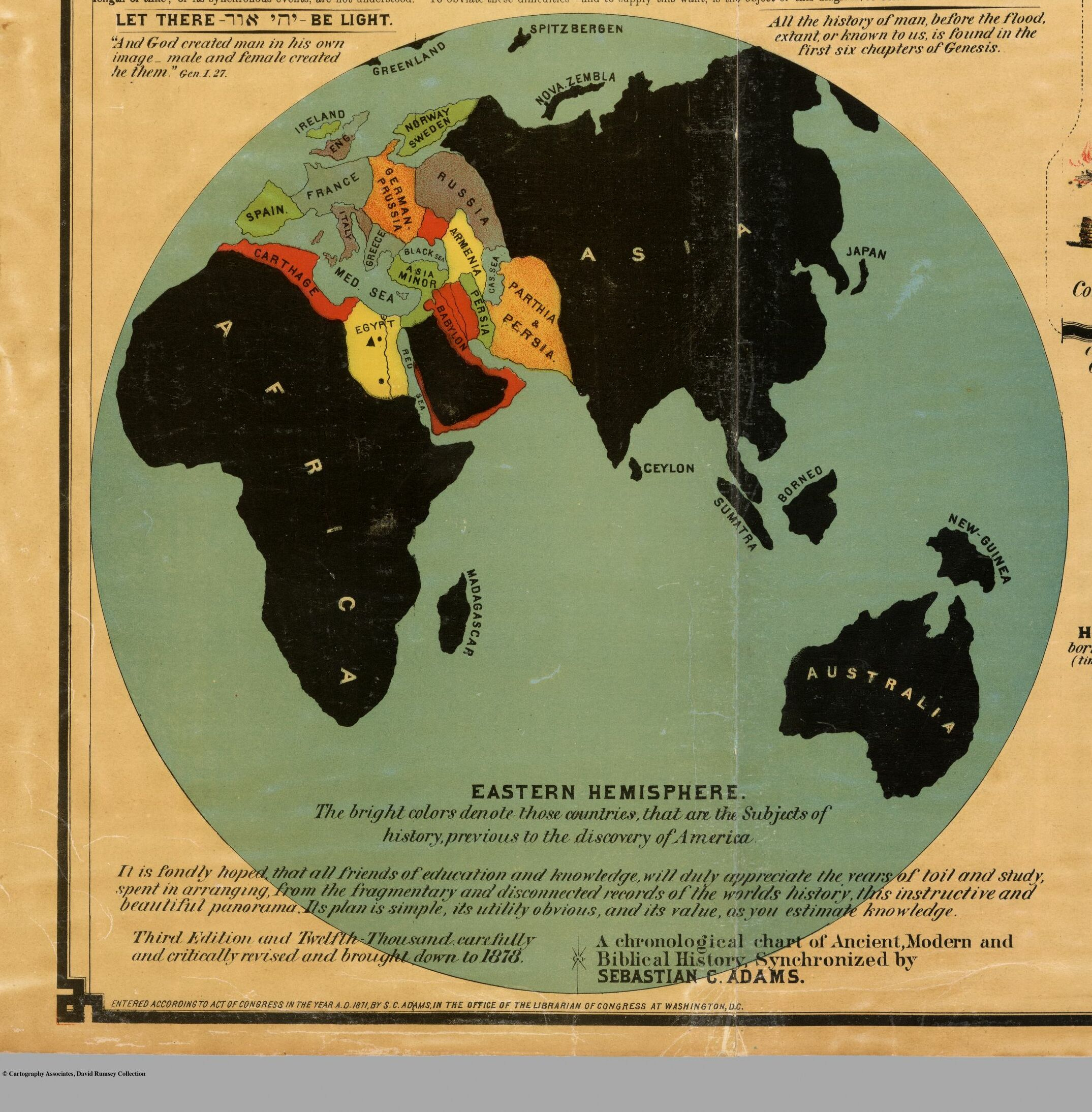
A map of the Eastern Hemisphere from Adams Synchronological Chart or Map of History. "The bright colors denote those countries that are the Subjects of history, previous to the discovery of America".

Eurocentrism (also Eurocentricity or Western-centrism) refers to viewing the West as the center of world events or superior to other cultures. The exact scope of Eurocentrism varies from the entire Western world to just the continent of Europe or even more narrowly, to Western Europe (especially during the Cold War). When the term is applied historically, it may be used in reference to the presentation of the European perspective on history as objective or absolute, often with an apologetic stance toward European colonialism and other forms of imperialism.

The term "Eurocentrism" dates back to the late 1970s but it did not become prevalent until the 1990s, when it was frequently applied in the context of decolonization and development and humanitarian aid that industrialised countries offered to developing countries. The term has since been used to critique Western narratives of progress, Western scholars who have downplayed and ignored non-Western contributions, and to contrast Western epistemologies with indigenous epistemologies.

== Terminology ==
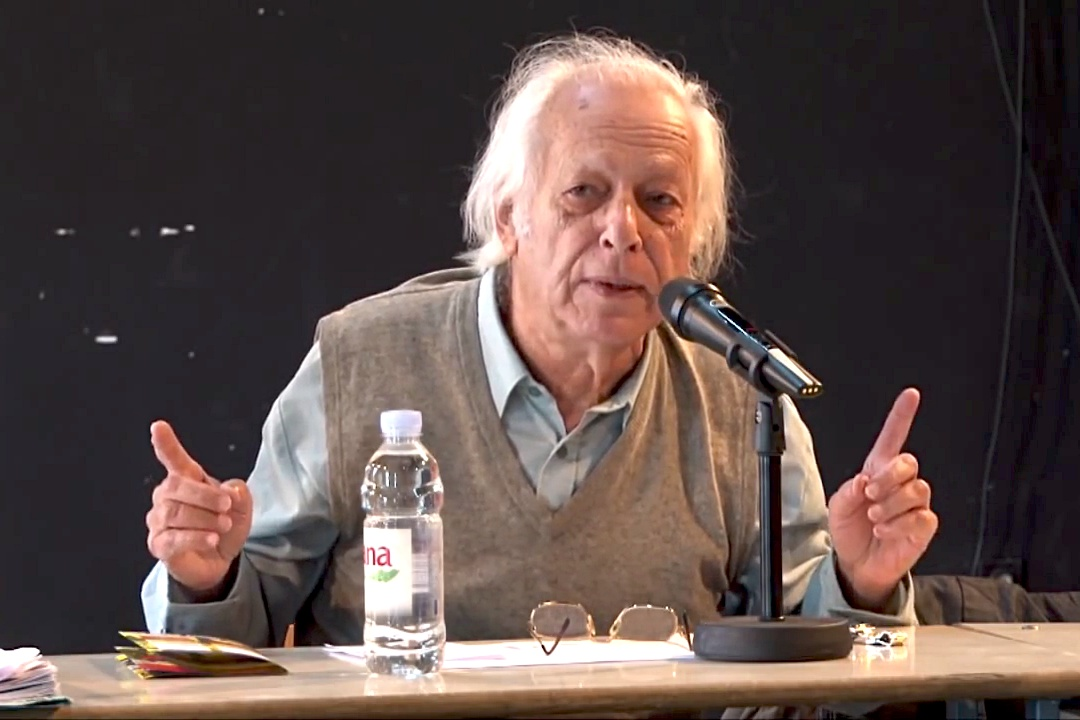
Eurocentrism as the term for an ideology was coined by Samir Amin in the 1970s.

The adjective Eurocentric, or Europe-centric, has been in use in various contexts since at least the 1920s. The term was popularised (in French as européocentrique) in the context of decolonization and internationalism in the mid-20th century. English usage of Eurocentric as an ideological term in identity politics was current by the mid-1980s.

The abstract noun Eurocentrism (French eurocentrisme, earlier europocentrisme) as the term for an ideology was coined in the 1970s by the Egyptian Marxian economist Samir Amin, then director of the African Institute for Economic Development and Planning of the United Nations Economic Commission for Africa. Amin used the term in the context of a global, core–periphery or dependency model of capitalist development. English usage of Eurocentrism is recorded by 1979. According to Amin, Eurocentrism dates back to the Renaissance, and did not flourish until the 19th century.

The coinage of Western-centrism is younger, attested in the late 1990s, and specific to English.

== History ==
According to historian Enrique Dussel, Eurocentrism has its roots in Hellenocentrism. Art historian and critic Christopher Allen points out that since antiquity, the outward-looking spirit of Western civilization has been more curious about other peoples and more open about learning about them than any other: Herodotus and Strabo travelled through Ancient Egypt and wrote about it in detail; Western explorers mapped the whole surface of the globe; Western scholars carried out fundamental research into all the languages of the world and established the sciences of archaeology and anthropology.

=== European exceptionalism ===
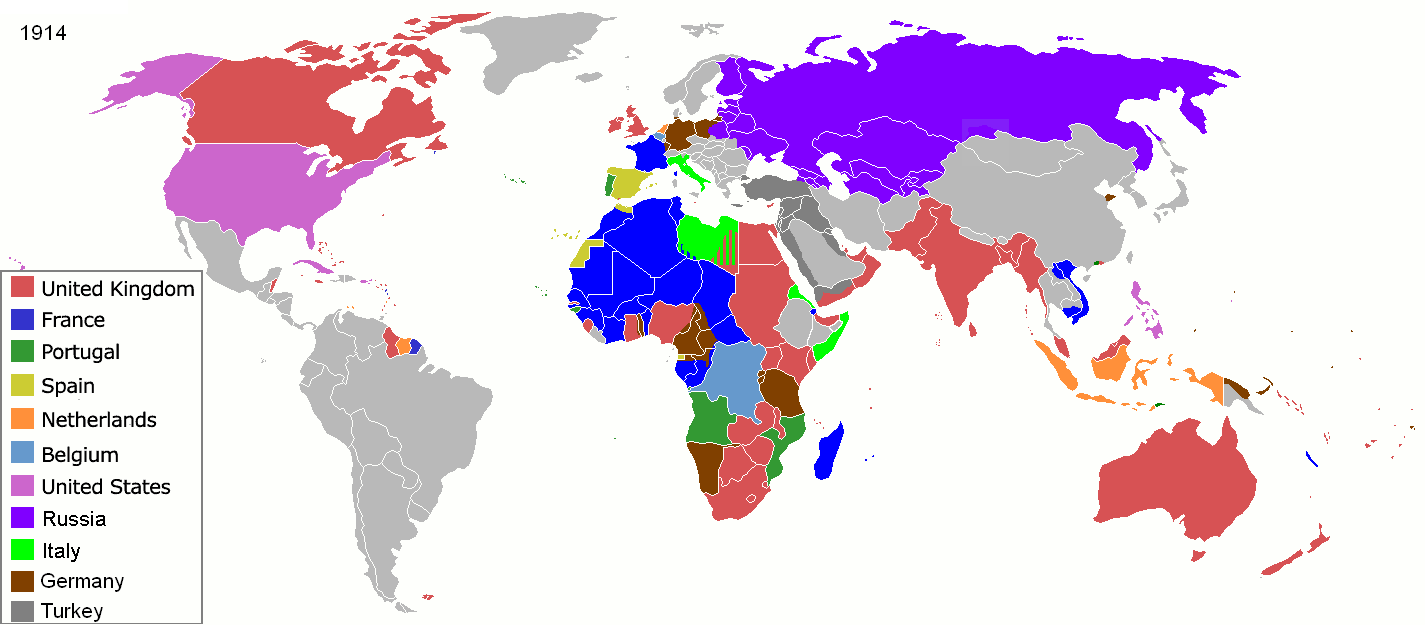
European colonial powers in 1914, before the start of World War I

During the European colonial era, encyclopedias often sought to give a rationale for the predominance of European rule during the colonial period by referring to a special position taken by Europe compared to the other continents.

Thus Johann Heinrich Zedler, in 1741, wrote that "even though Europe is the smallest of the world's four continents, it has for various reasons a position that places it before all others.... Its inhabitants have excellent customs, they are courteous and erudite in both sciences and crafts".

The Brockhaus Enzyklopädie (Conversations-Lexicon) of 1847 still expressed an ostensibly Eurocentric approach and claimed about Europe that "its geographical situation and its cultural and political significance is clearly the most important of the five continents, over which it has gained a most influential government both in material and even more so in cultural aspects".

European exceptionalism thus grew out of the Great Divergence of the Early Modern period, due to the combined effects of the Scientific Revolution, the Commercial Revolution, and the rise of colonial empires, the Industrial Revolution and a Second European colonization wave.

The assumption of European exceptionalism is widely reflected in popular genres of literature, especially in literature for young adults (for example, Rudyard Kipling's 1901 novel Kim) and in adventure-literature in general. Portrayal of European colonialism in such literature has been analysed in terms of Eurocentrism in retrospect, such as presenting idealised and often exaggeratedly masculine Western heroes, who conquered "savage" peoples in the remaining "dark spaces" of the globe.

The European miracle, a term coined by Eric Jones in 1981, refers to the surprising rise of Europe during the Early Modern period. During the 15th to 18th centuries, a great divergence took place, comprising the European Renaissance, the European Age of Discovery, the formation of European colonial empires, the Age of Reason, and the associated leap forward in technology and the development of capitalism and early industrialization. As a result, by the 19th century European powers dominated world trade and world politics.

In Lectures on the Philosophy of History, published in 1837, Georg Wilhelm Friedrich Hegel describes world history as starting in Asia but shifting to Greece and Italy, and then north of the Alps to France, Germany and England. Hegel interpreted India and China as stationary countries, lacking inner momentum. Hegel's China replaced the real historical development with a fixed, stable scenario, which made it the outsider of world history. Both India and China were waiting and anticipating a combination of certain factors from outside until they could acquire real progress in human civilization. Hegel's ideas had a profound impact on western historiography and attitudes. Some scholars disagree with his ideas that the Oriental countries were outside of world history.

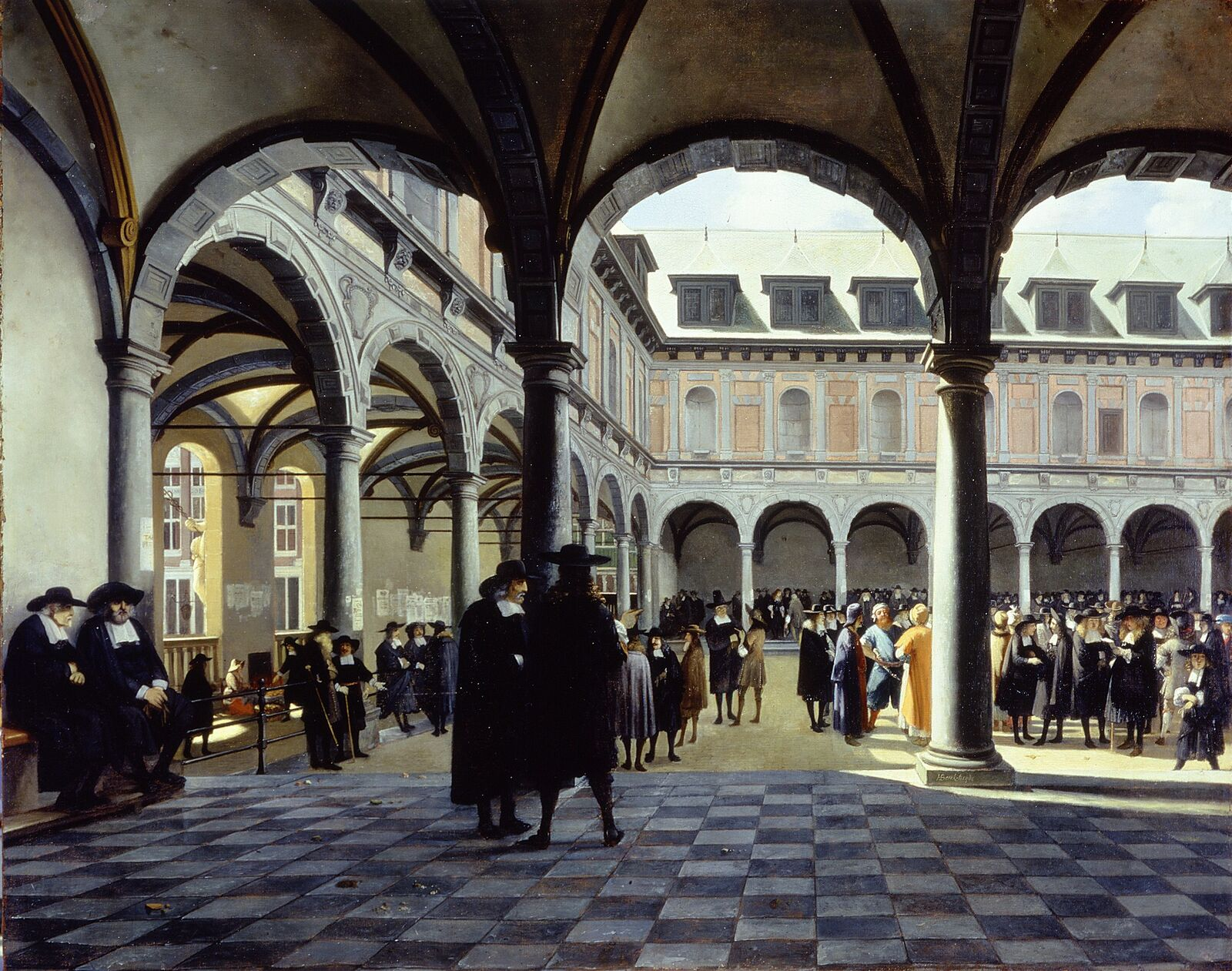
Courtyard of the Amsterdam Stock Exchange, circa 1670

Max Weber (1864-1920) suggested that capitalism is the speciality of Europe, because Oriental countries such as India and China do not contain the factors which would enable them to develop capitalism in a sufficient manner. Weber wrote and published many treatises in which he emphasized the distinctiveness of Europe. In The Protestant Ethic and the Spirit of Capitalism (1905), he wrote that the "rational" capitalism, manifested by its enterprises and mechanisms, only appeared in the Protestant western countries, and a series of generalised and universal cultural phenomena only appear in the west.

Even the state, with a written constitution and a government organised by trained administrators and constrained by rational law, only appears in the West, even though other regimes can also comprise states. ("Rationality" is a multi-layered term whose connotations are developed and escalated as with the social progress. Weber regarded rationality as a proprietary article for western capitalist society.)

=== Anticolonialism ===
Even in the 19th century, anticolonial movements had developed claims about national traditions and values that were set against those of Europe in Africa and India. In some cases, as China, where local ideology was even more exclusionist than the Eurocentric one, Westernization did not overwhelm longstanding Chinese attitudes to its own cultural centrality.

Orientalism developed in the late 18th century as a disproportionate Western interest in and idealization of Eastern (i.e. Asian) cultures.

By the early 20th century, some historians, such as Arnold J. Toynbee, were attempting to construct multifocal models of world civilizations. Toynbee also drew attention in Europe to non-European historians, such as the medieval Tunisian scholar Ibn Khaldun. He also established links with Asian thinkers, such as through his dialogues with Daisaku Ikeda of Soka Gakkai International.

=== Recent usage ===
Arab journalists detected Eurocentrism in western media coverage of the Russian invasion of Ukraine in February 2022, when the depth and scope of coverage and concern contrasted with that devoted to longer-running contemporary wars outside Europe such as those in Syria and in Yemen.

In football, the term Eurocentrism is used to critique the economic dominance UEFA has over club football teams from the rest of the world and how it negatively impacts the sport.

== Debate and academic discourse ==
Eurocentrism has been a particularly important concept in development studies. Brohman (1995) argued that Eurocentrism "perpetuated intellectual dependence on a restricted group of prestigious Western academic institutions that determine the subject matter and methods of research".

In treatises on historical or contemporary Eurocentrism that appeared since the 1990s, Eurocentrism is mostly cast in terms of dualisms such as civilised/barbaric or advanced/backward, developed/undeveloped, core/periphery, implying "evolutionary schemas through which societies inevitably progress", with a remnant of an "underlying presumption of a superior white Western self as referent of analysis." Eurocentrism and the dualistic properties that it labels on non-European countries, cultures and persons have often been criticised in the political discourse of the 1990s and 2000s, particularly in the greater context of political correctness, race in the United States and affirmative action.

In the 1990s, there was a trend of criticising various geographic terms current in the English language as Eurocentric, such as the traditional division of Eurasia into Europe and Asia or the term Middle East.

Eric Sheppard, in 2005, argued that contemporary Marxism itself has Eurocentric traits (in spite of "Eurocentrism" originating in the vocabulary of Marxian economics), because it supposes that the third world must go through a stage of capitalism before "progressive social formations can be envisioned".

Andre Gunder Frank harshly criticised Eurocentrism. He believed that most scholars were the disciples of the social sciences and history guided by Eurocentrism. He criticised some Western scholars for their ideas that non-Western areas lack outstanding contributions in history, economy, ideology, politics and culture compared with the West. These scholars believed that the same contribution made by the West gives Westerners an advantage of endo-genetic momentum which is pushed towards the rest of the world, but Frank believed that the Oriental countries also contributed to the human civilization in their own perspectives.

Arnold Toynbee in his A Study of History, gave a critical remark on Eurocentrism. He believed that although western capitalism shrouded the world and achieved a political unity based on its economy, the Western countries cannot "westernize" other countries. Toynbee concluded that Eurocentrism is characteristic of three misconceptions manifested by self-centerment, the fixed development of Oriental countries and linear progress.

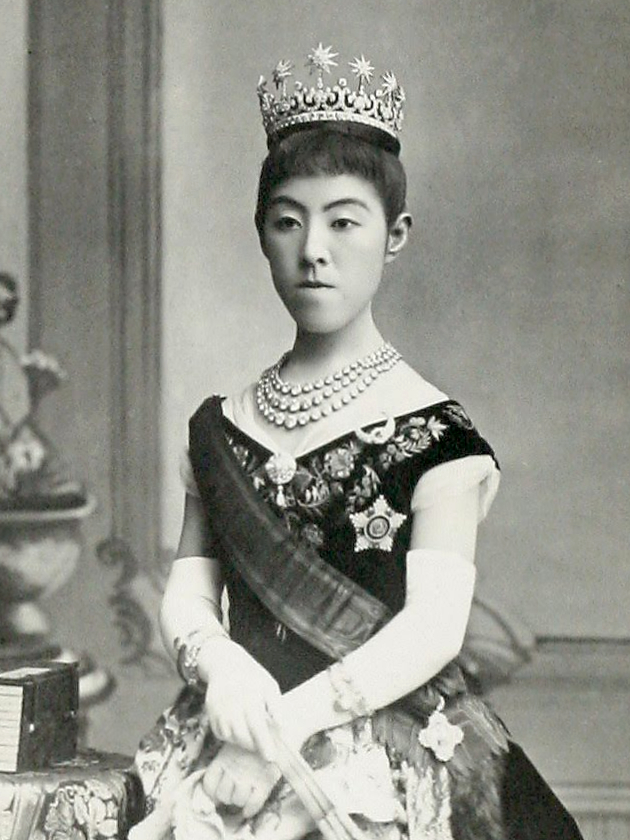
Japanese Empress Shōken in Western garb, a sign of the reform taken under the Meiji era (1868- 1912)

There has been some debate on whether historical Eurocentrism qualifies as "just another ethnocentrism", as it is found in most of the world's cultures, especially in cultures with imperial aspirations, as in the Sinocentrism in China; in the Empire of Japan (c. 1868–1945), or during the American Century. James M. Blaut (2000) argued that Eurocentrism indeed went beyond other ethnocentrisms, as the scale of European colonial expansion was historically unprecedented and resulted in the formation of a "colonizer's model of the world".

Indigenous philosophies have been noted to greatly contrast with Eurocentric thought. Indigenous scholar James (Sákéj) Youngblood Henderson states that Eurocentricism contrasts greatly with Indigenous worldviews: "the discord between Aboriginal and Eurocentric worldviews is dramatic. It is a conflict between natural and artificial contexts." Indigenous scholars Norman K. Denzin and Yvonna S. Linco state that "in some ways, the epistemological critique initiated by Indigenous knowledge is more radical than other sociopolitical critiques of the West, for the Indigenous critique questions the very foundations of Western ways of knowing and being."

The terms Afrocentrism vs. Eurocentrism have come to play a role in the 2000s to 2010s in the context of the academic discourse on race in the United States and critical whiteness studies, aiming to expose white supremacism and white privilege. Molefi Kete Asante, the foremost theorist of Afrocentricity, have argued that there is a prevalence of Eurocentric thought in the processing of much of academia on African affairs. He questions "Why Africans would want to see their own culture through the prism of Europe" and asserts that "African languages and cultures must be mined for valuable, positive, and creative ways of knowing, ritualizing, and developing human capacity." Similarly, Yoshitaka Miike, the founding theorist of Asiacentricity, has critiqued theoretical, methodological, and comparative Eurocentrism in knowledge production about Asian societies and cultures. He claims that "looking at Asia only with a Eurocentric critical eye and looking at the West only with a Eurocentric uncritical eye poses a serious problem in understanding and appreciating the fullest potentials of humanity and communication."

In an article, 'Eurocentrism and Academic Imperialism,' Professor Seyed Mohammad Marandi at the University of Tehran states that Eurocentric thought exists in almost all aspects of academia in many parts of the world, especially in the humanities. Edgar Alfred Bowring states that in the West, self-regard, self-congratulation and denigration of the 'Other' run more deeply and those tendencies have infected more aspects of their thinking, laws and policy than anywhere else. Luke Clossey and Nicholas Guyatt have measured the degree of Eurocentrism in the research programs of top history departments.

Some authors have focused on how scholars who denounce Eurocentrism often inadvertently reproduce Eurocentrism through culturally biased norms.

== Africa ==
=== Colonial historiography ===
[Africa] is no historical part of the World, it has no movement or development to exhibit. Historical movements in it- that is in the northern part- belong to the Atlantic or European World. Carthage displayed there an important transitionary phase of civilization; but, as a Phoenician colony, it belongs to Asia. Egypt will be considered in reference to the passage of the human mind from its Eastern to its Western phase, but it does not belong to the African Spirit. What we properly understand by Africa, is the Unhistorical, Underdeveloped spirit, still involved in the conditions of mere nature, and which have to be presented here only as on the threshold of the World’s History.

— Georg Wilhelm Friedrich Hegel, Lectures in the Philosophy of World History (1837)

Since most African societies used oral tradition to record their history, there was little written history of the continent prior to the colonial period. Colonial histories focussed on the exploits of soldiers, colonial administrators, and "colonial figures", using limited sources and written from an entirely European perspective, ignoring the viewpoint of the colonised under the pretence of white supremacism. Colonial historians considered Africans racially inferior, uncivilised, exotic, and historically static, viewing their colonial conquest as proof of Europe's claims to superiority. The most widespread genre of colonial narrative involved the Hamitic hypothesis, which claimed the inherent superiority of light-skinned people over dark-skinned people. Colonisers considered only "Hamitic Africans" to be "civilisation", and by extension all major advances and innovations in Africa were thought to derive from them. Oral sources were deprecated and dismissed by most historians, who claimed that Africa had no history other than that of Europeans in Africa. Some colonisers took interest in the other viewpoint and attempted to produce a more detailed history of Africa using oral sources and archaeology, however they received little recognition at the time.

African historiography became organised at the academic level in the mid 20th century. Despite a movement towards utilising oral sources in a multidisciplinary approach and their growing legitimacy in historiography, contemporary historians are still tasked with decolonising African historiography, building the institutional frameworks incorporating African epistemologies, and representing an African perspective.

== Latin America ==
Eurocentrism affected Latin America through colonial domination and expansion. This occurred through the application of new criteria meant to "impose a new social classification of the world population on a global scale". Based on this occurrence, a new social-historic identities were newly produced, although already produced in America. Some of these names include; 'Whites', 'Negroes', 'Blacks', 'Yellows', 'Olives', 'Indians', and 'Mestizos'. With the advantage of being located in the Atlantic basin, 'Whites' were in a privileged to control gold and silver production. The work which created the product was by 'Indians' and 'Negroes'. With the control of commercial capital from 'White' workers. And therefore, Europe or Western Europe emerged as the central place of new patterns and capitalist power.

== Islamic world ==
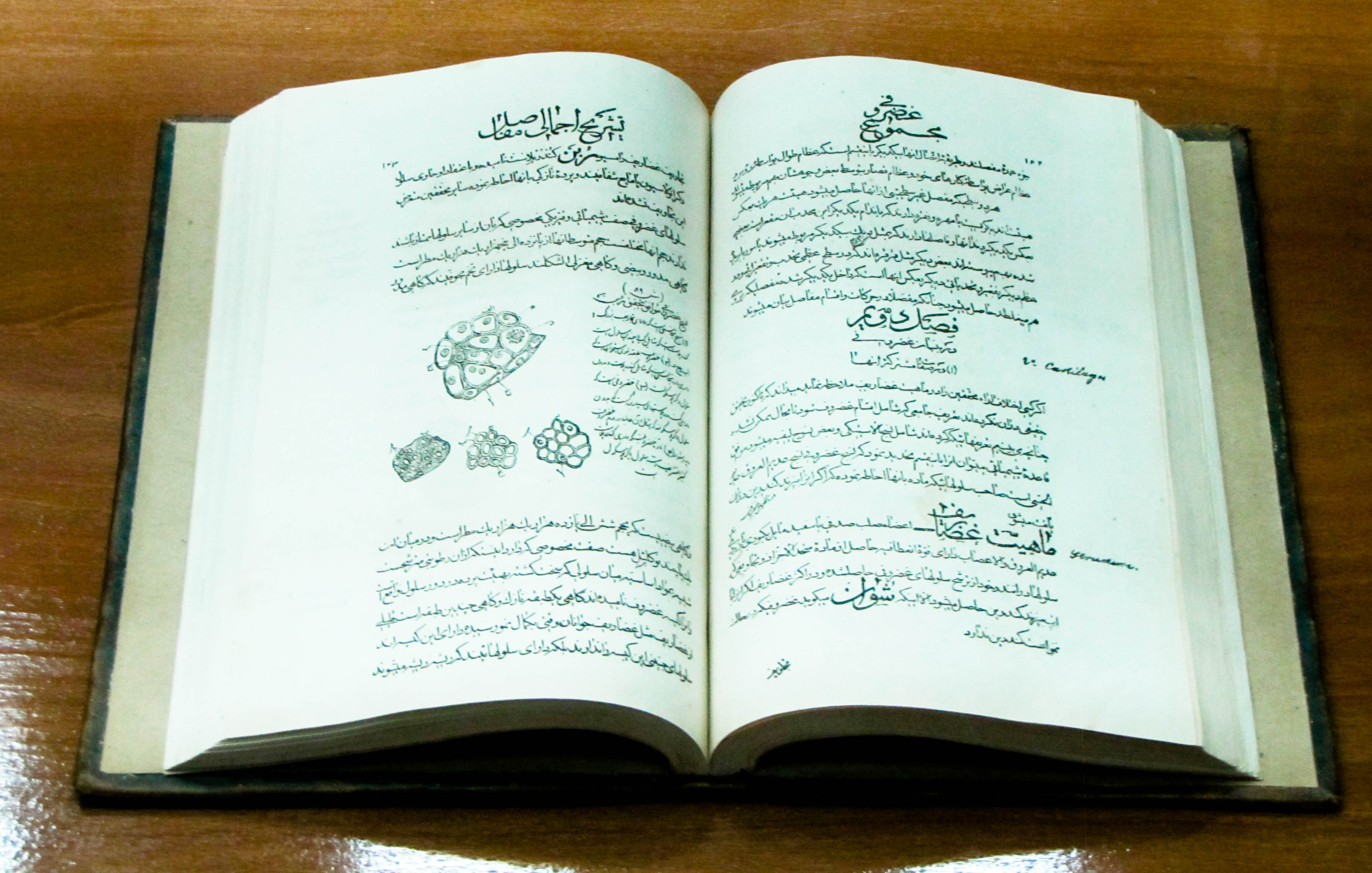
Front page of Avicenna's Canon of Medicine

In the history of Islamic–Persian civilization, scholars such as Muhammad Zakariyya Razi, Avicenna and Al-Biruni played a key role in the expansion of rationalism. All three were Persians, but wrote in Arabic; therefore, in later European tradition they were mistakenly identified as “Arabs”. Their works had a profound impact on Europe: Avicenna's Canon of Medicine remained a medical textbook for centuries, Razi became authoritative in medicine and pharmacology, and Biruni, through measurement and observation, came close to a scientific method.

Other thinkers were also part of this tradition: Ibn al-Haytham (Alhazen), who with his research on optics laid the foundation of the experimental method, al-Khwarizmi, whose name gave us algebra and the “algorithm”, Nasir al-Din al-Tusi with his innovations in astronomy that later influenced Copernicus, and Omar Khayyam, who reformed the Jalali calendar and solved cubic equations.

Nevertheless, the European Church treated these works selectively. The Paris synod of 1210 prohibited teaching Aristotle's works on natural philosophy and their Arabic commentaries (including Avicenna). In 1215 this ban was confirmed in the statutes of the University of Paris, allowing only logic and ethics. In 1270 and 1277, Bishop Étienne Tempier in Paris condemned 219 theses, some of which targeted Averroes and his followers.

In Toledo in the 12th and 13th centuries, hundreds of Arabic texts were translated into Latin. Translators (such as Gerard of Cremona) often obscured or altered the identity of the authors, and in Europe they were generally referred to simply as “Arab philosophers”.

After the Fall of Granada, many Arabic libraries were destroyed. In 1499–1501, Archbishop Cisneros ordered the burning of thousands of Arabic books in the Bib-Rambla square in Granada; only a small portion of medical texts was preserved.

The result of such policies—bans, selective translations, anonymization of authors and the burning of books—was that in Renaissance European historiography a Eurocentric narrative took shape: “Ancient Greece to Dark Ages to Renaissance to Modern Europe”. In this way, the role of Muslim and Iranian thinkers was reduced to that of “transmitters”, not innovators.

This narrative was partially corrected in academic scholarship of the 20th and 21st centuries, but in school curricula in Europe and the United States the old model still dominates: Avicenna may be briefly mentioned, but names such as Biruni, Razi, Al-Khwarizmi or Al-Tusi are often absent. As a result, a one-sided view persists that modernity is purely a European product, while the real history of science was multilayered and international.

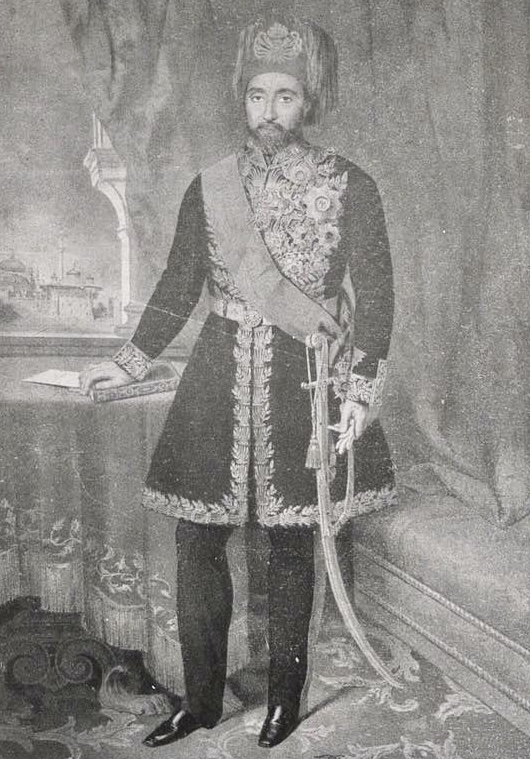
Ottoman Turkish statesman and diplomat Mustafa Reşid Pasha, the principal architect of the Edict of Gülhane. The goal of the decree was to help modernize the Ottoman Empire militarily and socially so that it could compete with the Great Powers of Europe.

Eurocentrism's effect on the Islamic world has predominantly come from a fundamental statement of preventing the account of lower-level explanation and account of Islamic cultures and their social evolution, mainly through eurocentrism's idealist construct. This construct has gained power from the historians revolving their conclusions around the idea of a central point that favours the notion that the evolution of societies and their progress are dictated by general tendencies, leading to the Islamic world's evolution becoming more of a philosophical topic of history instead of historical fact. Along with this, eurocentrism extends to trivialise and marginalise the philosophies, scientific contributions, cultures, and other additional facets of the Islamic world.

Stemming from Eurocentrism's innate bias towards Western civilization came the creation of the concept of the "European Society," which favoured the components (mainly Christianity) of European civilization and allowed eurocentrists to brand diverging societies and cultures as "uncivilized". Prevalent during the nineteenth century, the labelling of uncivilised in the eyes of eurocentrists enabled Western countries to classify non-European and non-white countries as inferior, and limit their inclusion and contribution in actions like international law. This exclusion was seen as acceptable by individuals like John Westlake, a professor of international law at the University of Cambridge at the time, who commented that countries with European civilizations should be those which comprise the international society, and that countries like Turkey and Persia should only be allowed a part of international law.

=== Orientalism ===
Eurocentrism's reach has not only affected the perception of the cultures and civilizations of the Islamic world, but also the aspects and ideas of Orientalism, a cultural idea that distinguished the "Orient" of the East from the "Occidental" Western societies of Europe and North America, and which was originally created so that the social and cultural milestones of the Islamic and Oriental world would be recognised. This effect began to take place during the nineteenth century when the Orientalist ideals were distilled and shifted from topics of sensuality and deviating mentalities to what is described by Edward Said as "unchallenged coherence". Along with this shift came the creation of two types of orientalism: latent, which covered the Orient's constant durability through history, and manifest, a more dynamic orientalism that changes with the new discovery of information. The eurocentric influence is shown in the latter, as the nature of manifest Orientalism is to be altered with new findings, which leaves it vulnerable to the warping of its refiner's ideals and principles. In this state, eurocentrism has used orientalism to portray the Orient as "backwards" and bolster the superiority of the Western world and continue the undermining of their cultures to further the agenda of racial inequality.

With those wanting to represent the eurocentric ideals better by way of orientalism, there came a barrier of languages, being Arabic, Persian, and other similar languages. With more researchers wanting to study more of Orientalism, there was an assumption made about the languages of the Islamic world: that having the ability to transcribe the texts of the past Islamic world would give great knowledge and insight on oriental studies. In order to do this, many researchers underwent training in philology, believing that an understanding of the languages would be the only necessary training. This reasoning came as the belief at the time was that other studies like anthropology and sociology were deemed irrelevant as they did not believe it misleading to this portion of mankind.

== Distortions of world maps and Eurocentrism ==
Modern world maps are most commonly based on the Mercator projection, developed in 1569 by the Flemish cartographer Gerardus Mercator. While the projection preserves angles and directions, making it useful for navigation, it significantly distorts relative sizes of landmasses. Regions near the poles, such as Europe and North America, appear far larger than they actually are, while equatorial regions, including the Middle East and Africa, are visually minimized.

For example, Greenland is shown as roughly comparable in size to Africa, when in reality Africa is about fourteen times larger. This visual imbalance has been criticized as reinforcing a Eurocentric worldview, granting Europe and North America disproportionate symbolic weight on the map, while diminishing the apparent importance of Africa, the Middle East, and Latin America.

Scholars of critical cartography argue that such projections exert a subtle psychological effect, encouraging what has been described as an implicit “self-aggrandizement” of the West. As a result, calls have been made to employ alternative projections—such as the Gall–Peters projection—which more accurately represent land area, in order to counteract the Eurocentric bias embedded in traditional world maps.

== See also ==
=== Pro-Eurocentrism ===
- Colonial mentality
- Discovery doctrine
- Orientalism

=== Anti-Eurocentrism ===
- Anti-Western sentiment
- The Crest of the Peacock: Non-European Roots of Mathematics
- The Eastern Origins of Western Civilisation

=== Other centrisms ===
- Afrocentrism
- Anglocentrism
- Asiacentrism
- Americentrism
- Ethnocentrism
- Hellenocentrism
- Indocentrism
- Sinocentrism

=== Related topics ===
- Atlanticism
- Anti-white racism
- History of Western civilization
- Pan-Arabism
- Pan-European identity
- Universalism in geography
- Western culture
- Western values
