= Hellenocentrism =

Worldview based on Greek Superiority

Hellenocentrism or Grecocentrism is a worldview centered on Greeks and Greek civilization. The worldview presupposes the idea that Greeks were somehow unique in world history and that Greek civilization essentially emerged from within itself. Nonetheless such premises have been frequently questioned.

== Meanings ==
According to Hatoon al-Fassi, Hellenocentrism "is a vision of history that views the Greek world as the centre of the civilised universe." Werner Jaeger employs the term "hellenocentric" to describe the Greek influence on the advancement of modern European culture. He argues that European history should always begin with Greece, where, he believes, the West belongs, both "physically and intellectually". Greece should always be a source of inspiration for Europe because it is the "hellenocentric world" that possesses "the ideal", and because both the temporal and spiritual journey of Europe begins there. For Nasos Vayenas, hellenocentrism can be understood as "a conviction of the uniqueness of the Greek element and its superiority over everything foreign – a conviction that usually leads elevating Greekness to the level of an absolute value". Vayenas argues that it is rather a traditionalism that speaks of the discovery of a "silenced Greek tradition".

According to Heinrich von Staden, the term hellenocentrism appears to carry at least two charges in the history of science. The first is that science historians prefer Greek science to science from other ancient civilizations, often with disastrous consequences. The second is that Eurocentric historians prefer a version of 'science' that "allows them to credit the Greeks with the invention of science and of 'the' scientific method". In Enrique Dussel's view, Hellenocentrism asserts that Greece is the cultural origin of the West and that Greek civilization "owes nothing to the Egyptians and Semites," arguing that Greece was nothing more than a "dependent" and "peripheral Western part" of the Middle East cultures until Alexander the Great's conquests.

== Implications ==
Lidewijde de Jong maintains that hellenocentrism is deeply rooted in European history and archaeology. For Peter Green, it has "distorted and diminished the achievements of any civilisation" that came in contact with the Greeks. Han Lamers argues that proponents of a hellenocentric worldview, such as George Trapezuntius, sought to "reduce all forms of progress and decline ultimately to Greek affairs".

Enrique Dussel held that hellenocentrism is the forefather of Eurocentrism. For Markus Winkler, racism and colonialism have their roots in Eurocentric worldview which essentially emerged from ancient hellenocentrism. Kang Jung In and Eom Kwanyong also refer to hellenocentrism as the archetype of "Westcentrism" which, they argue, has adopted the Greek civilization as its "intellectual origin" and universalized it. According to Sabelo Ndlovu-Gatsheni, hellenocentrism paved the way for "Westernization" as a "process of imposing Euro-North American-centric values on other people" at the expense of their own values.

== See also ==
- Eurocentrism
- Orientalism
- Classical tradition
- Transmission of the Greek Classics
- Legacy of the Roman Empire
- Succession of the Roman Empire
