= Koreacentrism =

Koreacentrism (also, Korea-centrism) is an ethnocentric perspective that regards Korea to be central or unique relative to other countries and holds that Korean people and culture are superior to others.

Korea-centrism has been associated with Korean nationalism and religious practices, such as Korean shamanism and later, Unification Church as well as some elements of Korean Protestantism. It encompasses traditional views of Korea as the center of the world (axis mundi) and Koreans as the "chosen people" (for example, according Unification Church's reading of the Book of Revelation, when Jesus returns in the Second Coming, he will be Korean). In the wider Asian context this view has been also associated with the "Little China" ideology (Sojunghwa).

Korea-centrism has been linked with some elements of the Protestantism in South Korea, and Korean missionary initiatives, which some Korean pastors and Christian activists (such as Paul Choi) have argued are more efficient and should be prioritized compared to American missionary activities. Also, Korea-centrism frequently appears among ethnic Korean pro-Zionist (such as Korean Christian Zionist) activists because the history of modern Korean nationalism shares some similarities with Zionism.

North Korean Juche ideology has also been described as Korea-centric.

== See also ==
- Religiocentrism
- Sinocentrism
