= Universalism in geography =

Universalism, in human geography, signals the position that ideas of development produced in Western social sciences hold for all times and places. Universalist thinking began in the Age of Enlightenment when philosophers decided on "truths" that could explain occurrences rationally and accurately. Development geography, human geography and other disciplines seek to find and critique universal "truths". Critics suggest that Universalism has created a world knowledge hierarchy placing Western Europe, North America and the rest of the "developed" world at the top, as the centre of knowledge, and placing the rest of the globe below, as ignorant and needing to be educated. The hierarchy reiterates the core-periphery notion, examining it in terms of knowledge differentials across space.

== Origins ==
As intellectuals began to question traditional understandings of the world and think on a global scale, new "truths" were created to help explain the world as placeless, free of cultural specificity, abstract and apolitical. They began to manifest themselves in development policies, political apparatuses, and other institutions. In the late 19th and 20th century, Émile Durkheim wrote that "the truths of [modern] science are independent of any local context", echoing the Enlightenment's philosophies and assuming an isotropic globe, thus allowing homogeneity to overtake difference. A sense of security and superiority was wielded as the world was now understood, which allowed for the continued teaching of and reliance upon universal "truths".

One can see how saying that all knowledge is geographically located is widely taken as a way of saying that the knowledge in question is not authentically true at all.

== Global diffusion ==
As universal "truth" claims gained acceptance among Western intellectuals, they began an important transition into the school system. Michel Foucault describes the 17th- and-18th century school systems as being important because of highly complex systems of conditioning. As "truth" claims were taught to children, they became embedded within societal and political apparatuses. Once cemented within such institutions, they were able to flourish and remain.

Through the imperialist expansion by the west and the successive colonisation around the globe, supposed universal "truths" began to diffuse across borders, space and place. Once colonies were set up and dominant hegemons were in place the processes of the west began to be the processes of the world and the necessary steps to modernisation.

== Changing truths ==
The realization that the truths may not be universal across different spaces was an important factor in the 1970s, when questions arose of nationally varying styles of science. By the mid-1980s, geographical sensibility towards science increased, seeking to show that locality and spatial situation needed to be remembered to understand how scientific knowledge was made, became credible and flowed globally. It has been with that new situational approach to knowledge formation that allowed geographers to begin analyses of epistemology with relation to place and confront "truth" formation with a more culturally ecological (cultural ecology) approach.

== Foucaulta truths ==
Important to universalism in geography is understanding how knowledge becomes accepted as truth. Foucault discusses truth in terms of "societal regimes of truth" and explains that truths are made up by societies by selecting "the types of discourse which it accepts and makes function as true" and creating and controlling "the mechanisms that enable us to distinguish between true and false statements". He goes on about the relationship between truth and systems of power and how they produce and maintain such regimes of truth.
