= Robert T. Oliver =

American writer (1909-2000)

- Born: Robert Tarbell Oliver; July 7, 1909; Sweet Home, Oregon, United States
- Died: May 29, 2000 (aged 90); Chestertown, Maryland
- Education: B.A., Pacific University; M.A., University of Oregon; Ph.D., University of Wisconsin
- Alma mater: University of Wisconsin
- Occupations: Distinguished professor; researcher; educator; speech writer; consultant
- Spouse: Pauline Shivery
- Writing career
- Language: English
- Subjects: Rhetorical Communication, International Communication, Intercultural Communication
- Notable works: Culture and Communication, Communication and Culture in Ancient India and China, Leadership in Asia

Robert Tarbell Oliver (July 7, 1909 – May 29, 2000) was an American writer, lecturer, and an authority on public speaking, argumentation and debate, and Asian rhetorical traditions.

== Biography ==
Oliver was born in Sweet Home, Oregon. He graduated from Pacific University. He received his M.A. from the University of Oregon in 1933 and earned his Ph.D. in speech from the University of Wisconsin in 1936. He served as assistant director of the Victory Speakers Bureau in the Office of Civilian Defense in Washington, D.C., during World War II. He was also chief of the National Food Conservation Office in the War Foods Department.

Oliver was appointed professor and chair of the Department of Speech at Pennsylvania State University in 1949. He then became an adviser to President Syngman Rhee. By special arrangement, he continued to serve the Korean government in that capacity while he was at Pennsylvania State University. He also taught Clark Junior College, Bradley College, Bucknell University, and Syracuse University.

Oliver retired as research professor emeritus of international speech in the Department of Communication Arts and Sciences at Pennsylvania State University in 1970. He served as president of the National Communication Association in 1964, president of the Eastern Communication Association in 1967, and president of the Pennsylvania State Communication Association.

Oliver was a pioneering scholar in the study of Asian rhetorics and communication. He authored more than 50 books on international rhetoric, intercultural communication, and Asian history.

The East is not the West. Cultures differ, and minds, feelings, and intentions in differing societies intermesh in differing ways. Discourse occurs, or is constrained, under different circumstances and has different styles for different reasons. . . . Any attempt to discover in Asia prototypes of the Western rhetorical canons would be unavailing. It would resemble trying to measure the salinity of water with a ruler.

== Asian interest and influence ==
He has for many years made a study of Korea, and was a close friend and associate of Syngman Rhee, and served as an adviser to President Rhee in Korea, and to the Korean Commission and the Korean Delegation to the United Nations Since 1947 he has managed the Washington Bureau.of the Korean Pacific Press and was the editor of the monthly magazine Korean Survey

According to Robert Shuter, "For over sixty years, Dr. Oliver wrote prolifically about the impact of culture on rhetoric and communication. Although Dr. Oliver rarely used the words intercultural communication in his writings, which were voluminous, he contributed greatly to the development of the field." He stated that "Dr. Oliver’s landmark Asian research, which began around 1942, influenced a generation of communication researchers in many specialties including intercultural communication."

== Bibliography ==
- Oliver, R. T. (1939). Training for effective speech. New York: Cordon.
- Oliver, R. T. (1942). Psychology of persuasive speech. New York: Longmans, Green & Co.
- Oliver, R. T. (1944). Korea: Forgotten nation. Washington, DC: Public Affairs Press.
- Oliver, R. T. (1945). Effective speech notebook. Syracuse, NY: Syracuse University Press.
- Oliver, R. T. (1946). Four who spoke out: Burke, Fox, Sheridan, Pitt. Syracuse, NY: Syracuse University Press.
- Oliver, R. T. (1950). Persuasive speaking: Principles and methods. New York: Longmans, Green & Co.
- Oliver, R. T. (1950). Why war came in Korea. New York: Fordham University Press.
- Oliver, R. T. (1951). The truth about Korea. London: Putman.
- Oliver, R. T. (1952). Verdict in Korea. State College, PA: Bald Eagle Press.
- Oliver, R. T. (Ed.). (1953). Korea, my country by Yung Tai Pyun. Washington, DC: Library of International Speech, Korean Pacific Press.
- Oliver, R. T. (1954). Syngman Rhee: The man behind the myth. New York: Dodd Mead.
- Oliver, R. T. (1962). Culture and communication: The problem of penetrating national and cultural boundaries. Springfield, IL: Charles C. Thomas.
- Oliver, R. T. (1971). Communication and culture in ancient India and China. Syracuse, NY: Syracuse University Press.
- Oliver, R. T. (1989). Leadership in Asia: Persuasive communication in the making of nations, 1850-1950. Newark, NJ: University of Delaware Press.
- Oliver, R. T. (1993). A history of the Korean people in modern times: 1800 to the present. Newark, DE: University of Delaware Press.
- Oliver, R. T. (1997). The way it was–All the way: A documentary accounting. Washington, DC: National Communication Association (originally published in Communication Quarterly, Vol. 45, No. 2, pp. 1–130).
- Oliver, R. T., & Cortright, R. L. (1946/1952). The new training for effective speech. New York: Dryden Press.
- Oliver, R. T., & Robbins, H. L. (1943). Developing ideas into essays and speeches. New York: Longman.
- Oliver, R. T., Zelko, H. P., & Hickey, D. C. (1949). Essentials of communicative speech. New York: Holt, Rhinehart & Winston.

About Robert T. Oliver

- Berquist, G. (1990). The rhetorical travels of Robert T. Oliver. Rhetoric Review, 9(1), 173-183. https://www.jstor.org/stable/465429
- Fritz, J. M. H. (Ed.). (2010). The Pennsylvania Scholars Series: Vol. 5 Robert T. Oliver—Standard bearer of the discipline. Pittsburgh, PA: Pennsylvania Communication Association.
- Oliver, R. T. (1993). My life as a Korean ghost. Korea Journal, 33(4), 68-80. http://www.ekoreajournal.net/, reference to this article and three more in Korea Journal (search results)
- Shuter, R. (2011). Robert T. Oliver: Trailblazer in intercultural communication. China Media Research, 7(2), 121-126. https://epublications.marquette.edu/comm_fac/53/
