= Journal of Applied Communication Research =

- Discipline: Communication studies
- Language: English

Publication details
- History: 1973–present
- Publisher: Taylor & Francis on behalf of the National Communication Association
- Frequency: 6/year

Standard abbreviations
- ISO 4: J. Appl. Commun. Res.

Indexing
- ISSN: 0090-9882 (print); 1479-5752 (web)

Links
- Journal homepage

Journal of Applied Communication Research is a quarterly peer-reviewed academic journal published by Taylor & Francis on behalf of the National Communication Association. JACR publishes original scholarship that contributes to knowledge about how people practice communication across diverse applied contexts. All theoretical and methodological approaches are welcome, as are all contextual areas. Of utmost importance is that an applied communication problem or issue is clearly identified as the motivation for the research.

Because of the journal's commitment to both academic and applied audiences, JACR articles should clearly address both academic implications and specific applications drawn from the research. Of particular interest are studies that focus on contemporary social issues.

== Abstracting and indexing ==
The journal is abstracted and indexed in

- Abstracts in Social Gerontology
- Communication Abstracts
- Current Contents/Social & Behavioral Sciences
- Electronic Collections Online
- ERIC
- Linguistics and Language Behavior Abstracts
- OCLC
- PsycINFO
- Public Administration Abstracts
- Scopus
- Social Sciences Citation Index
- Sociological Abstracts
- Social Services Abstracts
- Sociological Abstracts
