= Foreign policy of the Biden administration =

The United States' foreign policy under president Joe Biden's administration (2021–2025) emphasized repairing U.S. alliances, which Biden argued were damaged during the preceding first administration of Donald Trump. Biden sought to restore the U.S. to a "position of trusted leadership" amongst global democracies in order to address challenges posed by Russia and China. The administration repeatedly stated that no other world power should be allowed to surpass the U.S., either militarily or economically. Biden’s foreign policy drew from mid-20th century liberal internationalism.

Key advisors in Biden's foreign policy team included Secretary of State Antony Blinken, Secretary of Defense Lloyd Austin, and National Security Advisor Jake Sullivan. The administration moved to strengthen the transatlantic alliance between the U.S. and Europe, including by reaffirming the U.S.' commitment to NATO. The U.S. rejoined the Paris Climate Agreement. Biden emphasized international cooperation in combating the COVID-19 pandemic, as well as strengthened U.S. defenses against foreign-sponsored cyber-attacks and cyber espionage. The administration continued several of Trump's policies, including U.S. competition with China and sending weapons to Israel.

Biden supported Ukraine during the Russian invasion of Ukraine. The U.S. gave aid to Ukraine, which critics variously saw as too much or too little. Critics also accused the administration of giving vague answers regarding their goals in the conflict.

== Appointments ==
Biden's 2021 foreign policy team

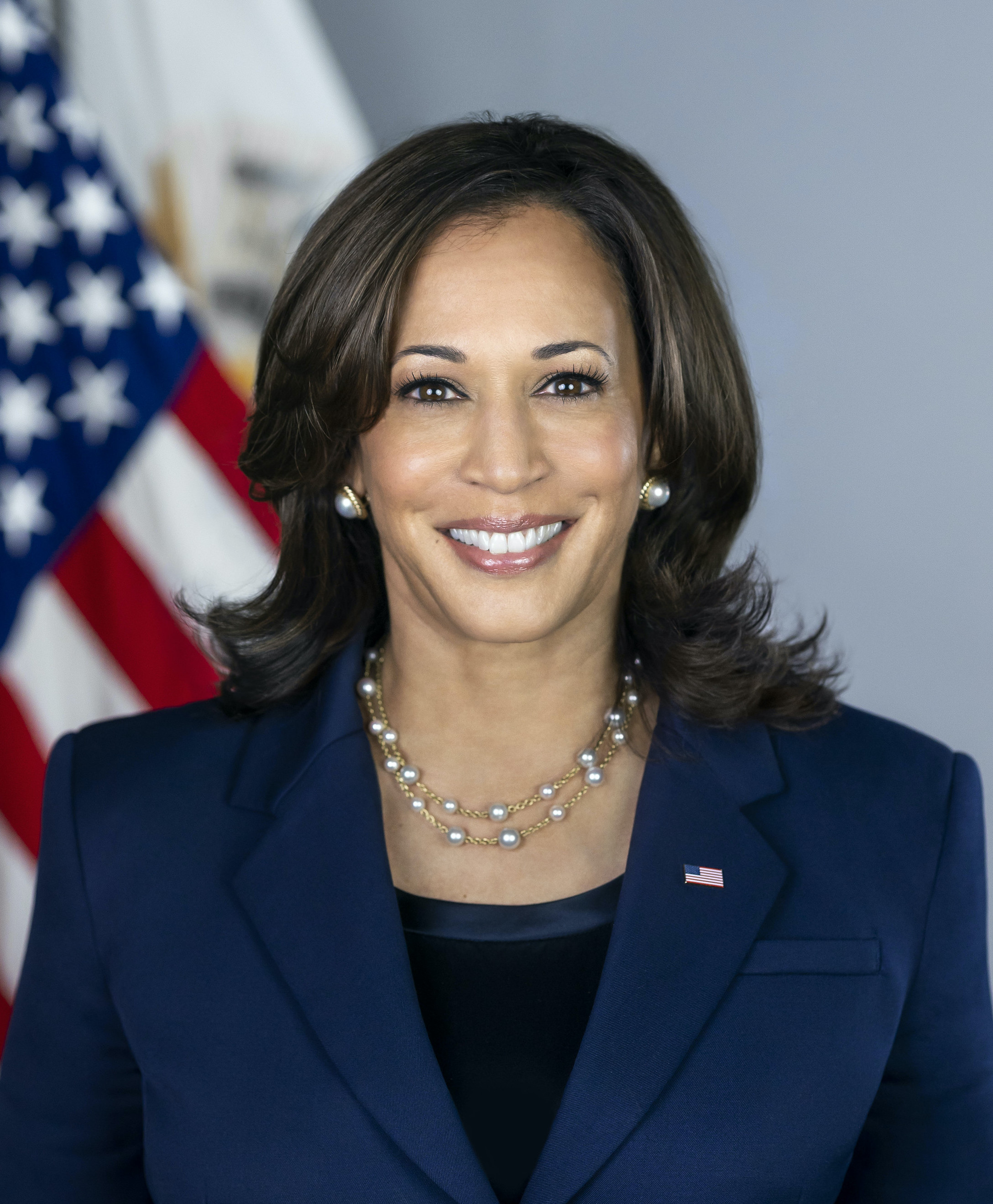
Kamala Harris

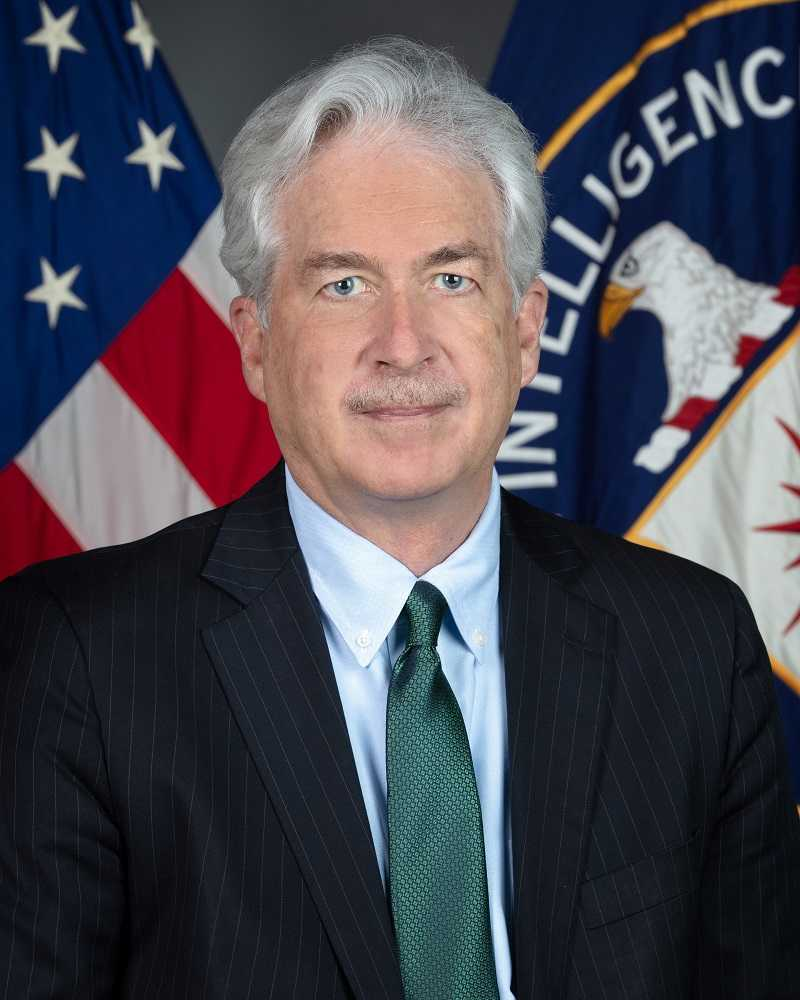
William Burns

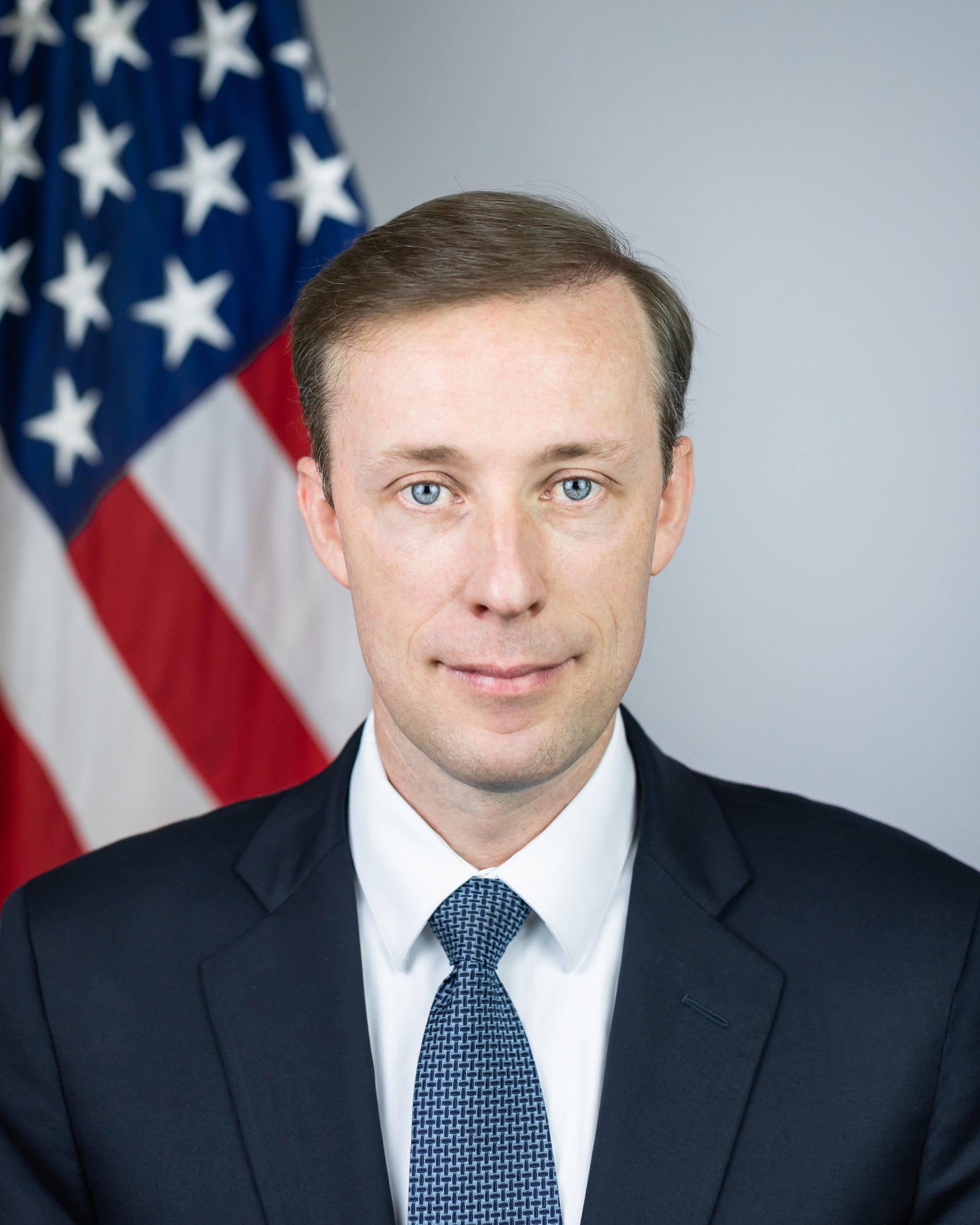
Jake Sullivan

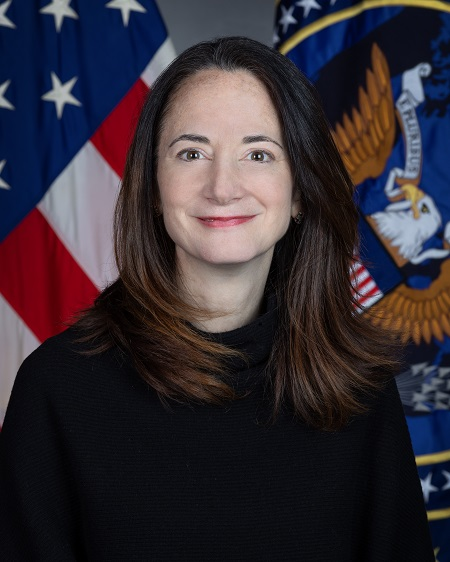
Avril Haines

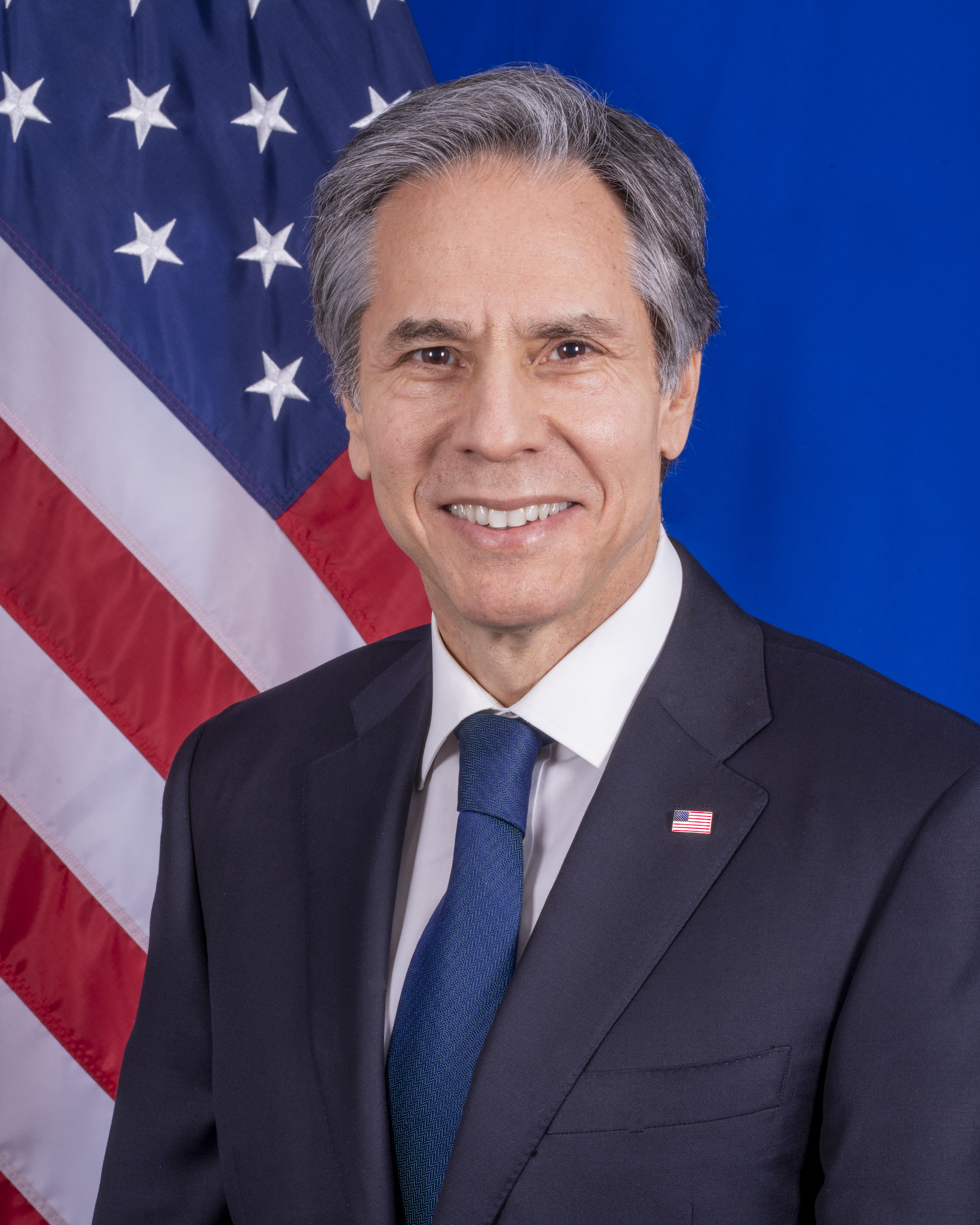
Antony Blinken

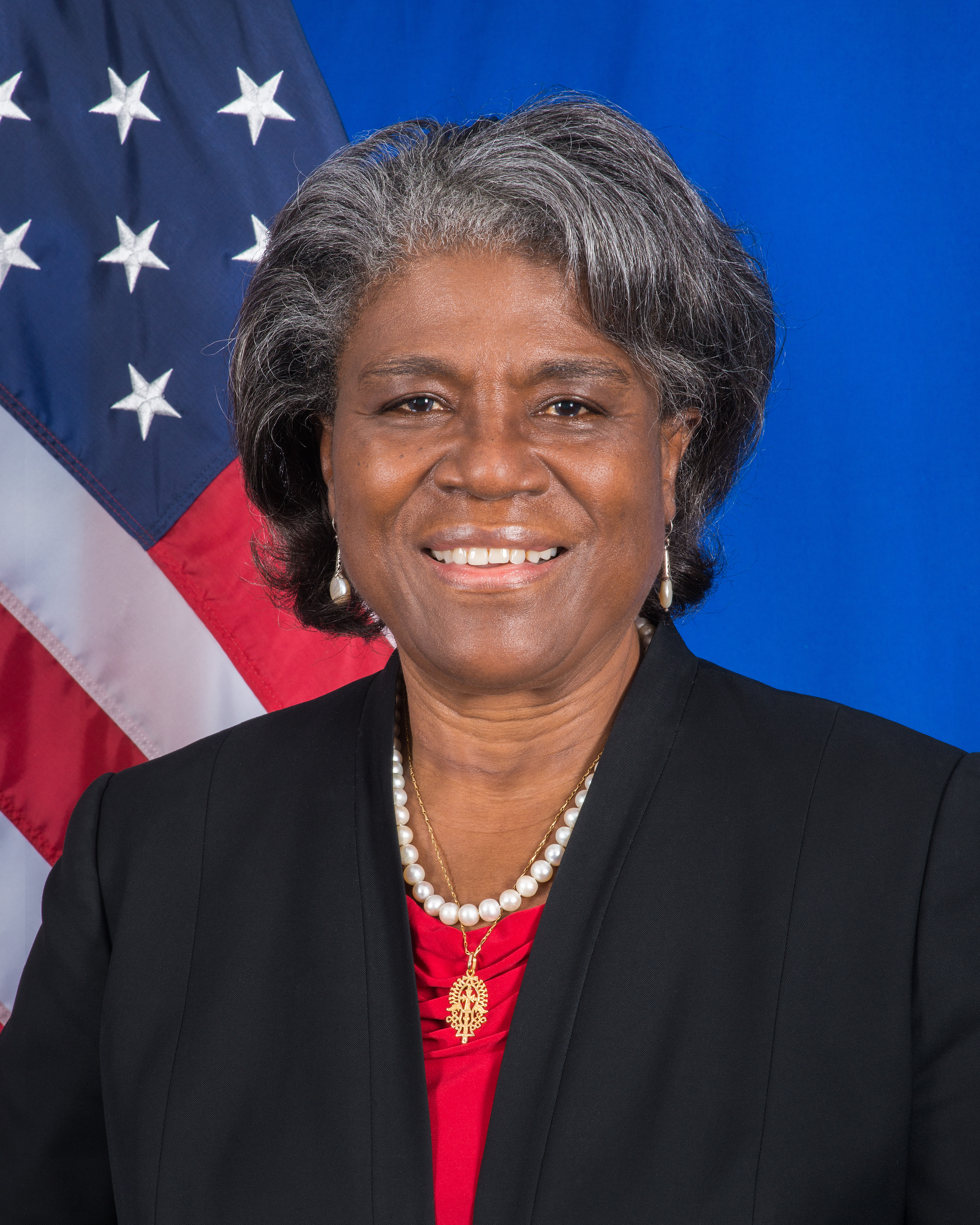
Linda Thomas-Greenfield

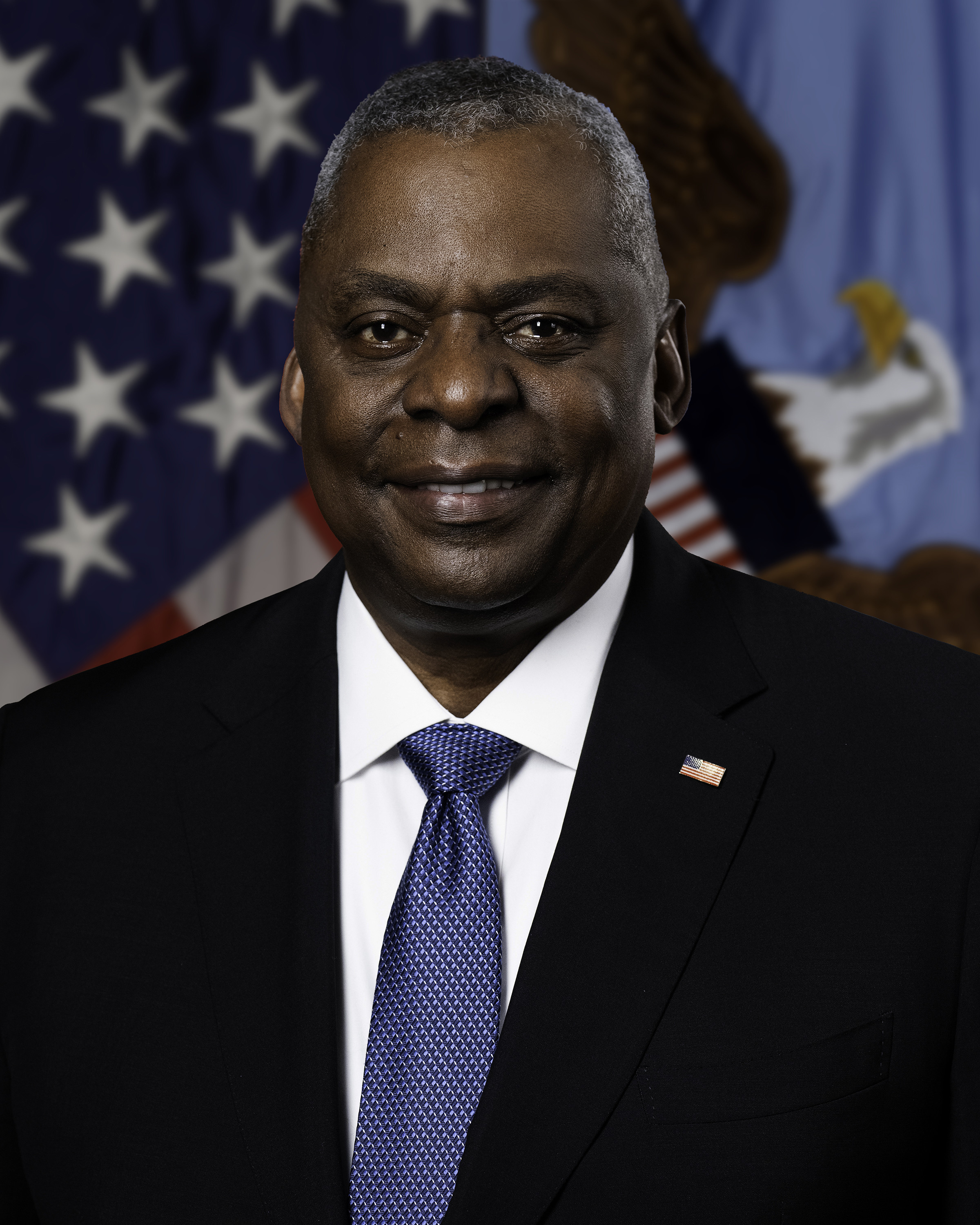
Lloyd Austin

Biden administration Foreign Policy Personnel
Vice President	Kamala Harris (2021–2025)	
White House Chief of Staff	Ron Klain (2021–2023)	Jeff Zients (2023–2025)
Secretary of State	Antony Blinken (2021–2025)	
Secretary of Defense	Lloyd Austin (2021–2025)	
Ambassador to the United Nations	Linda Thomas-Greenfield (2021–2025)	
Director of National Intelligence	Avril Haines (2021–2025)	
Director of the Central Intelligence Agency	William Burns (2021–2025)	
Assistant to the President for National Security Affairs	Jake Sullivan (2021–2025)	
Deputy National Security Advisor	Jonathan Finer (2021–2025)	
Trade Representative	Katherine Tai (2021–2025)	

== Americas ==
=== Brazil ===
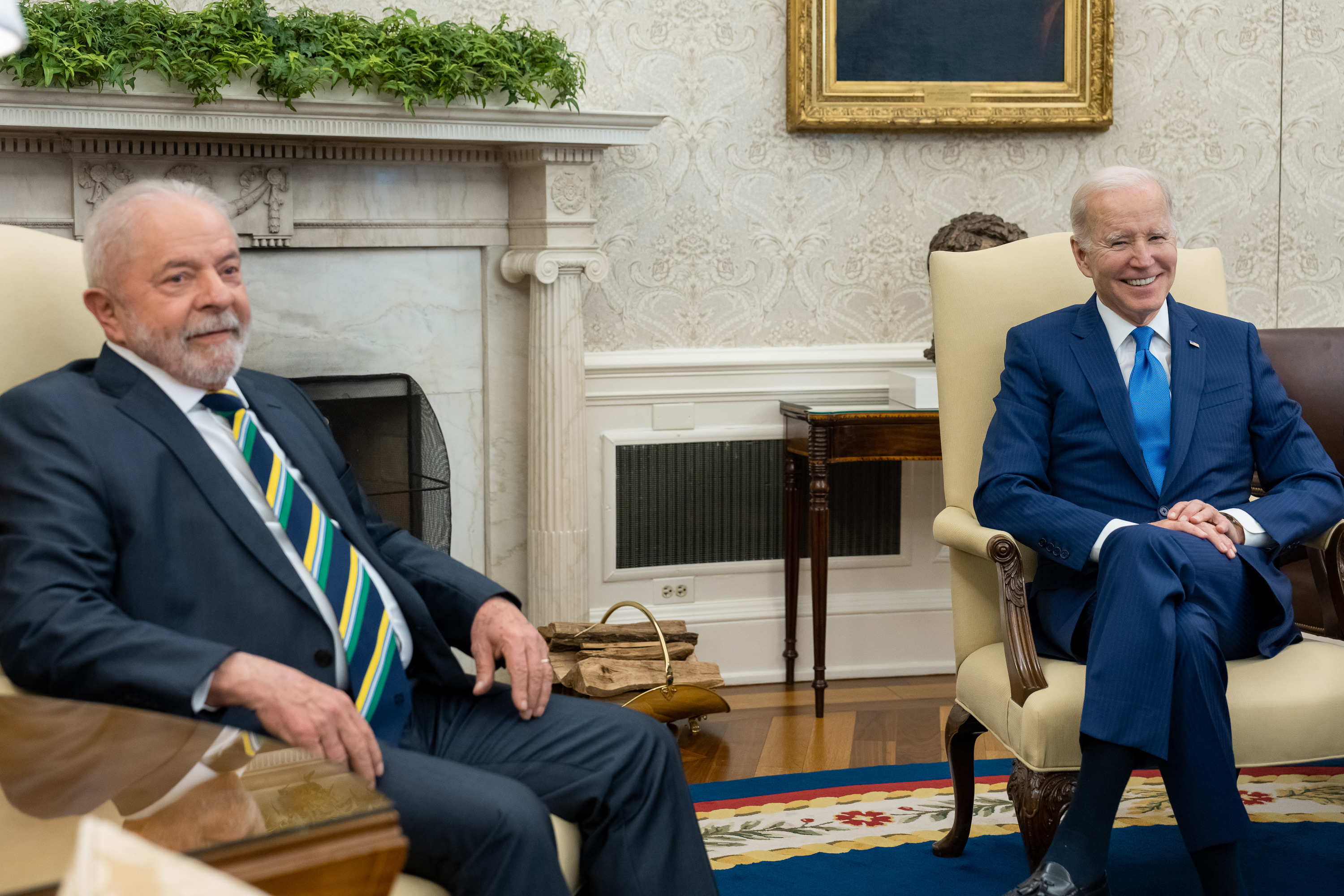
Biden and Brazilian President Luiz Inácio Lula da Silva, February 2023

Brazil–U.S. relations changed under the Biden administration. During the previous administration, then-Brazilian President Jair Bolsonaro, a right-wing populist and ally of Biden's predecessor, Donald Trump, enjoyed close ties with the US. However, following President Biden's election, tensions arose due to the two leaders' ideological differences, Bolsonaro's praise for Trump, and his support for Trump's allegations about the legitimacy of Biden's election. However, both Biden and Bolsonaro expressed a willingness to collaborate on climate change and environmental protection.

After the election of the Brazilian president Luiz Inácio Lula da Silva, a left-wing former president, the relationship between the two countries shifted again. In a meeting between the two leaders in February 2023, Biden and da Silva both spotlighted a renewed emphasis on collaboration and dialogue between the two countries. President Biden emphasized that fostering dialogue, peace, and democracy in Brazil was a key priority for the United States.

Addressing climate change and environmental stewardship, particularly in the Amazon rainforest, emerged as a crucial area for both Biden and Da Silva. Da Silva's administration committed to significant changes in Brazil's environmental approach, including aiming to achieve "zero deforestation" by 2030. These goals aligned closely with Biden's priorities.

Nevertheless, differences between the leaders arose on certain issues. Notably, there were diverging views regarding China and the Russian invasion of Ukraine. Da Silva exhibited caution in openly criticizing China, as it was Brazil's largest trading partner. Additionally, Brazil showed reluctance to fully endorse U.S. calls for greater opposition to Russia's war in Ukraine during Biden’s presidency.

=== Canada ===
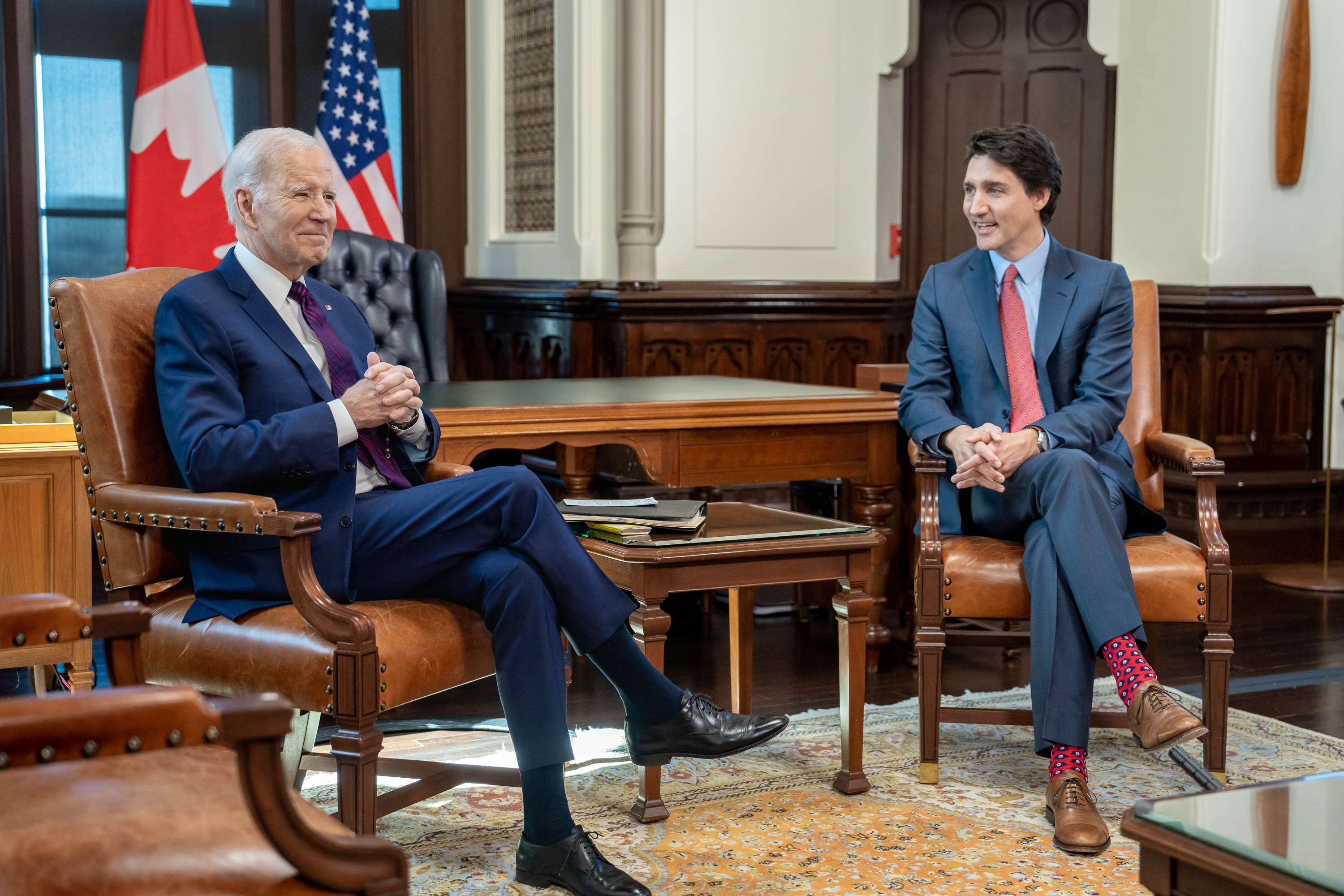
Biden and Canadian Prime Minister Justin Trudeau, March 2023

In January 2021, Biden's administration announced the cancellation of the Keystone Pipeline extension. Biden explained that he was following through on a campaign promise and restoring a decision made by the former Obama administration, while acknowledging that the decision will cause hardship to Canada. The administration also discussed many issues at the same time, including the COVID-19 pandemic and the associated economic recovery, climate change and environmental issues, NATO, indigenous issues, and other international relations. Biden and Trudeau had a teleconference in February, and discussed COVID-19, climate change, the detention of the Two Michaels in China, NORAD, systemic racism, and gender equality.

In 2020, Biden admitted that the USMCA negotiated by the Trump administration was "better than NAFTA". In November 2021, Biden hosted the first "Three Amigos" meeting since 2016. Trudeau accused Biden's tax-credit proposal for union-made electric vehicles of breaking the USMCA rules. Economic tensions arose from protectionist measures and trade incentives for American industry as part of Biden's "Buy American" campaign.

=== Colombia ===
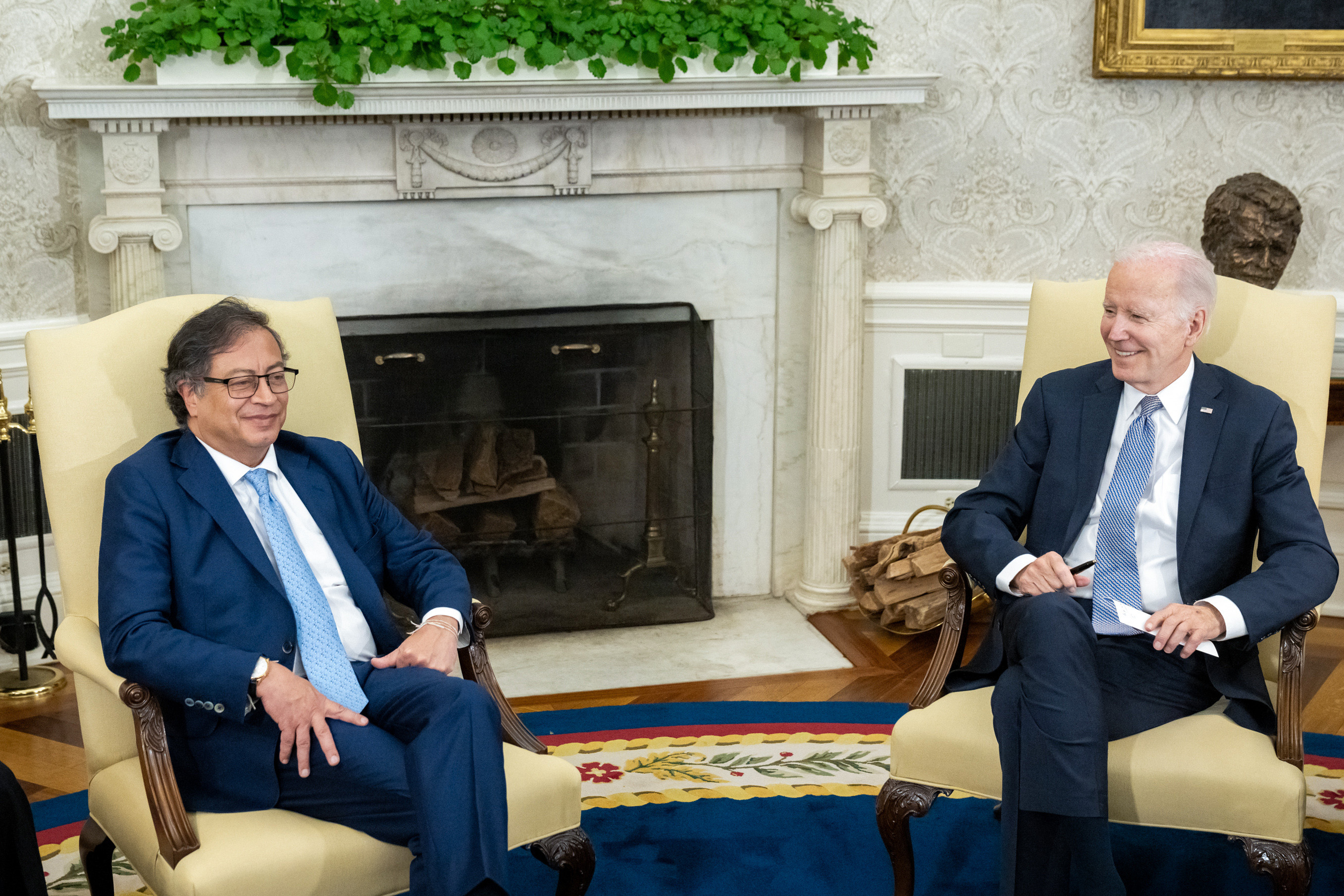
Biden and Colombian President Gustavo Petro, April 2023.

Despite Colombian President Iván Duque's Democratic Centre Party supporting Donald Trump during the 2020 U.S. presidential election, Duque maintained friendly relations with the U.S. under Biden. The Biden administration showed signs of favoring right-wing candidates in the Colombian presidential election of 2022: senior US diplomats spoke to the press about alleged Russian, Cuban, and Venezuelan interference in the election in favor of leftist candidate Gustavo Petro, while they met with many political candidates, except Petro In April 2023, he met with Biden at the White House, where topics such as decarbonization, the construction of a green economy in America, and electrical transmission at the continental level were discussed. They also discussed the payment of foreign debt through actions against climate change.

The U.S. promised an investment of $500 million for the Amazon Fund as part of a joint effort between the two nations to combat climate change. With this contribution, the United States became one of the largest donors to this international conservation program, which was established during the previous term of President Luiz Inácio Lula da Silva to protect the Amazon rainforest from deforestation.

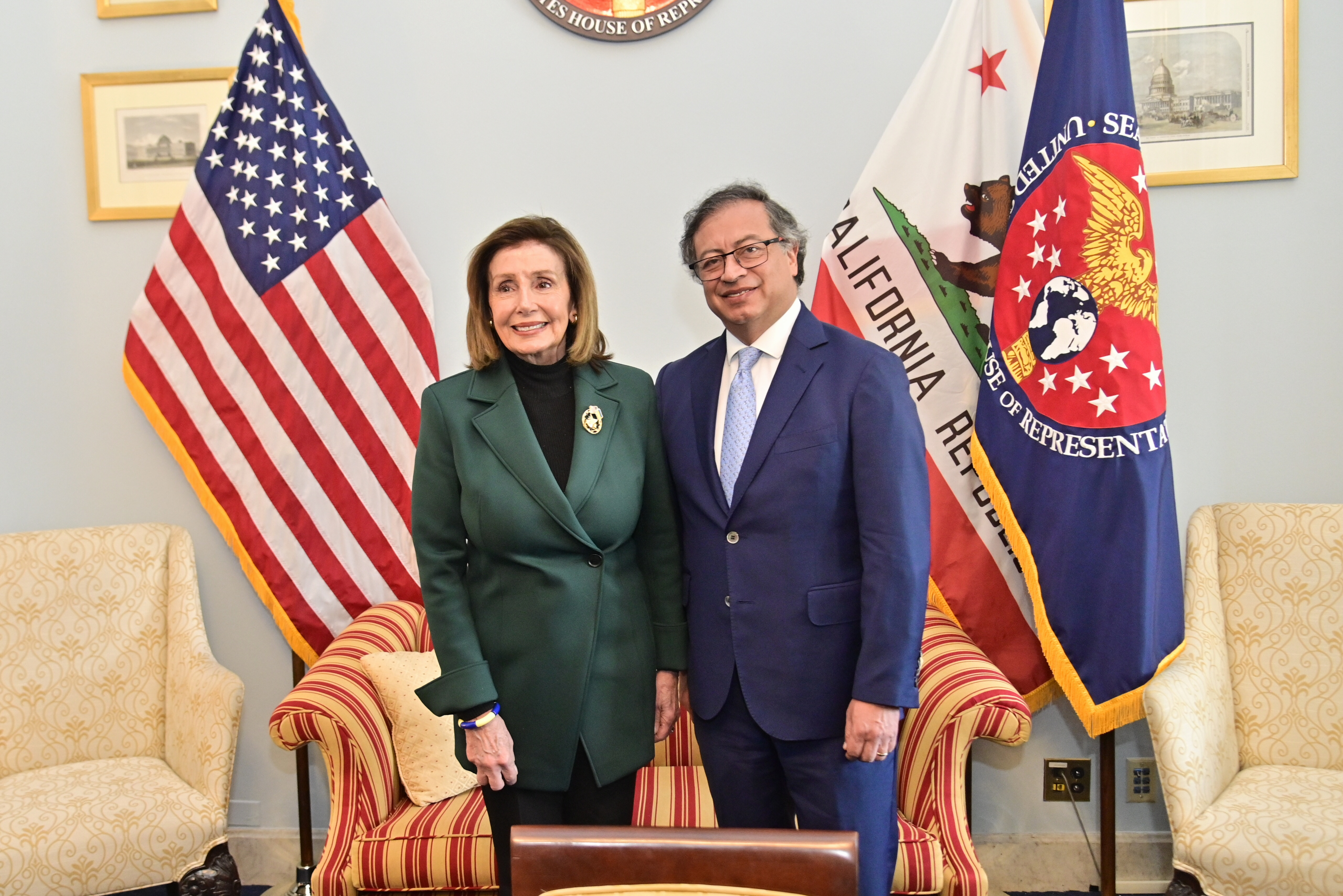
Gustavo Petro with Nancy Pelosi.

Later, he had a meeting with former U.S. House Speaker Nancy Pelosi, where he reiterated the need for United States support for the agrarian reform proposed by the administration.

=== Central America ===
==== Nicaragua ====
The Biden administration continued American support for Nicaraguan civil society groups, human rights, and free elections against the government, the latter of which were accused of human rights violations, political suppression, and corruption. An attempt by Nicaraguan president Daniel Ortega to cut social benefits in 2018 led to widespread protests and a crackdown on opposition politicians, protesters, and press.

The administration expressed "[deep] concern about the escalating crackdown" and called for Ortega to reverse course. In a June 22, 2021 United Nations Human Rights Council meeting, the United States joined 58 other countries to call for the release of jailed presidential candidates and dissidents and the rehabilitation of Nicaraguan democracy. On July 12, 2021, the State Department imposed visa restrictions on 100 members of the Nicaraguan legislature and judiciary accused of enabling "attacks on democracy and human rights" by Ortega and Murillo, Ortega's wife and vice president. Biden's FY2022 budget request included $15 million of aid for Nicaragua, all of which will be directed towards democracy and rights programs. On August 6, 2021, the State Department placed visa restrictions on 50 immediate family members of Nicaraguan officials accused of benefiting from Ortega's regime; this came amidst an upcoming November 2021 election in which many opposition candidates had been arrested or barred from running.

==== Northern Triangle ====
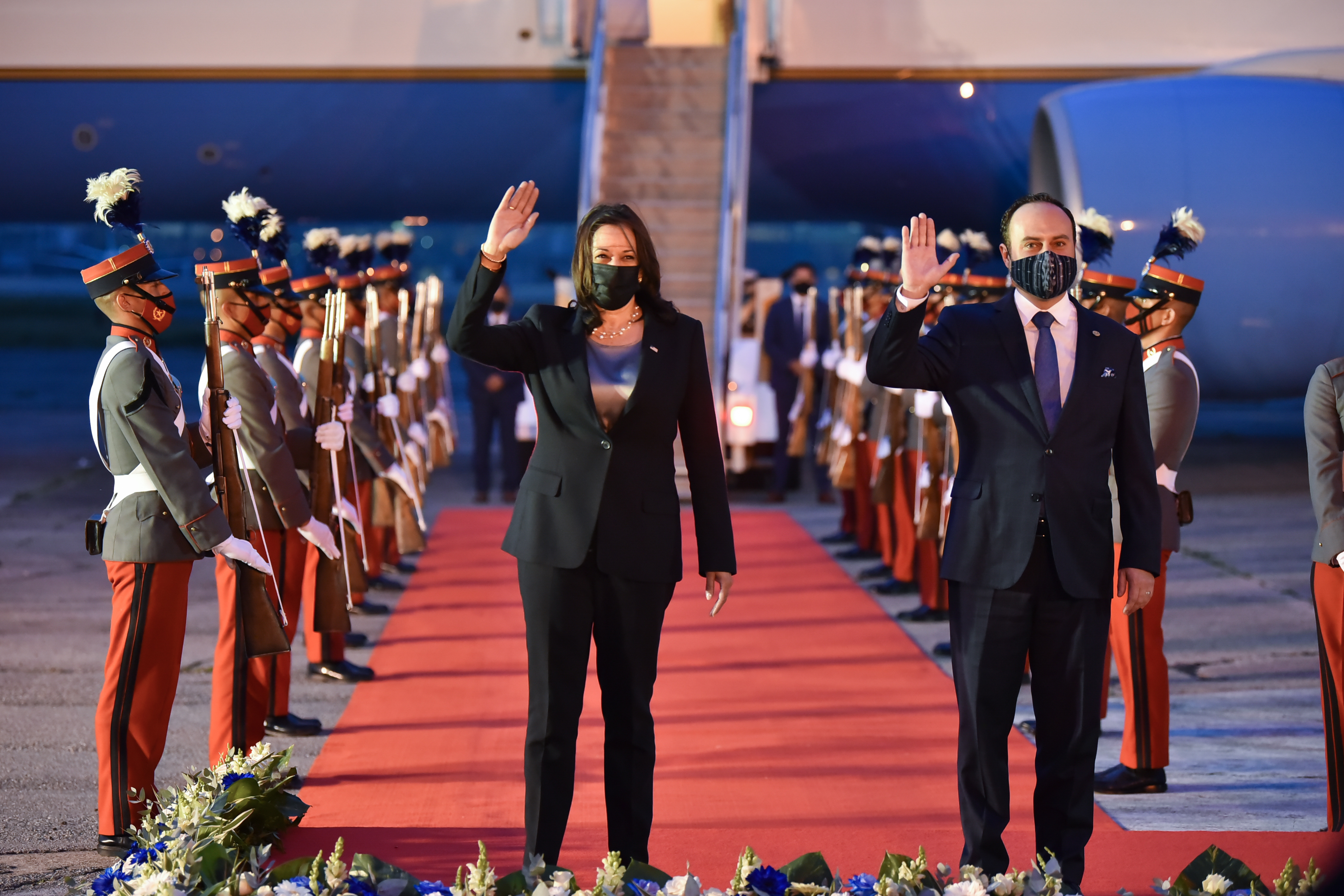
Vice President Harris arriving in Guatemala in 2021

The Northern Triangle refers to the three Central American countries of Honduras, El Salvador, and Guatemala, usually in reference to the nations' poverty, political instability, and crime/violence as motivating factors of their residents' legal and illegal immigration to the United States.

Mexican President López Obrador said that President Biden pledged $4 billion for development in Honduras, El Salvador, and Guatemala. Secretary of State Antony Blinken said on February 6 that agreements with those three countries to send asylum-seekers back to those countries until their cases were heard were suspended.

Vice President Kamala Harris visited Guatemala as part of her first foreign trip in office. In Guatemala City, Harris held a joint press conference with Guatemalan President Alejandro Giammattei where she issued an appeal to potential migrants, stating, "I want to be clear to folks in the region who are thinking about making that dangerous trek to the United States-Mexico border: Do not come. Do not come."

=== Cuba ===
The Biden administration maintained most of the sanctions against Cuba that were issued by Trump, despite one of Biden's campaign promises being to lift restrictions against the country.

In June 2021, the Biden administration continued America's tradition of voting against an annual UN General Assembly resolution calling for an end to the U.S. economic embargo against Cuba. The resolution was adopted for the 29th time with 184 votes in favor, three abstentions, and two no votes: the U.S. and Israel.

In July 2021, protesters gathered in front of the White House to call for Biden to take action against Cuba for human rights abuses on the island. The administration then sanctioned a key Cuban official and a government special forces unit, known as the Boinas Negras. In July, directly before hosting a meeting with Cuban American leaders, Biden stated: "I unequivocally condemn the mass detentions and sham trials that are unjustly sentencing to prison those who dared to speak out in an effort to intimidate and threaten the Cuban people into silence." Biden also ordered government specialists to develop ideas for the U.S. to unilaterally extend internet access on the island, and he promised to enhance backing for Cuban dissidents.

In August 2021, Biden sanctioned three additional Cuban officials who were alleged to be suppressing anti-government protesters in Cuba.

In December 2021, 114 Democratic House members signed a letter that urged Biden to lift restrictions and sanctions against Cuba in order to make their access to food and medicine easier.

In January 2022, Biden again sanctioned Cuban officials, this time placing travel restrictions on eight members of the Cuban government.

In May 2022, the Biden administration lifted some of the sanctions, with policy changes such as the expansion of flights to Cuba and the resumption of a family reunification program. In January 2023, the Biden administration limited the number of Cuban migrants who could enter the U.S.

In 2025, the Biden administration removed Cuba from the state sponsors of terrorism list, in concert with a prisoner exchange with them.

=== Haiti ===
Biden condemned the assassination of Haitian President Jovenel Moïse in 2021. He later announced that he would be sending troops to guard the embassy in Port-au-Prince. The Haitian government asked the US, as well as the United Nations and Canada, for more troops, but this was rejected.

=== Mexico ===
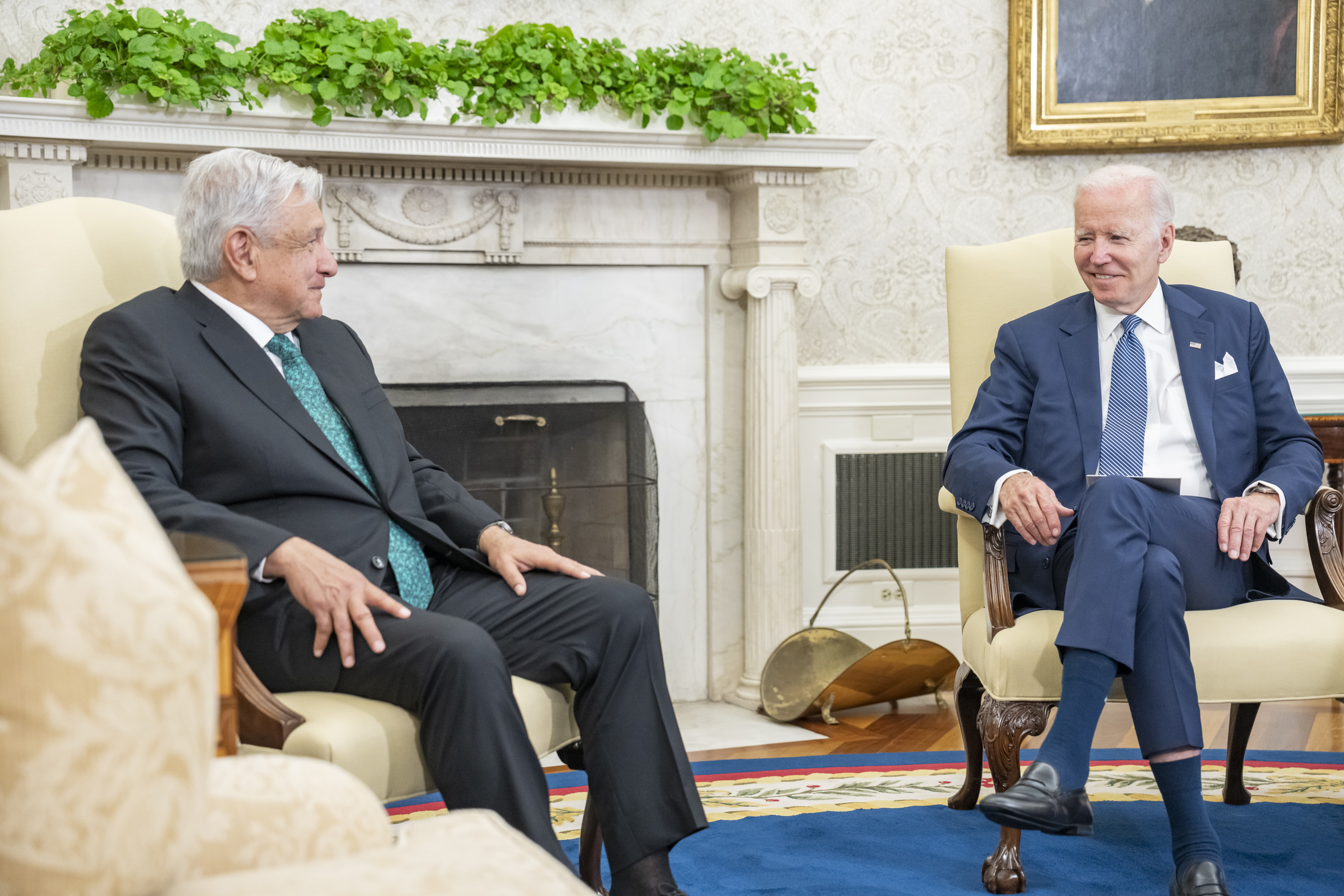
Biden and Mexican President Andrés Manuel López Obrador, July 2022

Biden had a call with Mexican President Andrés Manuel López Obrador on January 22, 2021. On the call they spoke of issues such as regionality and regional migration, reducing immigration across the Mexico–U.S. border by targeting the root cause, increasing resettlement capacity, providing legal alternatives for immigration pathways, improving the treatment of immigrants at the border, adequate arbitration of requests for asylum, reversal of the Trump administration's immigration policies, and the COVID-19 pandemic. Obrador said the call was "pleasant and respectful" and that relations between Mexico and the U.S. would improve in the future.

Biden held his bilateral meeting with President Obrador on March 1, 2021, virtually.

In January 2024, a Republican-led non-binding resolution denouncing the Biden-Harris administration's handling of the Mexico–United States border passed the House of Representatives by a vote of 225–187, with 211 Republicans and 14 Democrats supporting it.

In February 2024, Secretary of Homeland Security Alejandro Mayorkas was impeached on a 214-213 party-line vote by the United States House of Representatives over his handling of the Mexico–United States border.

In July 2024, the United States House of Representatives voted 220–196 to pass another Republican-led resolution condemning the Biden-Harris administration for its handling of the Mexico–United States border. Six Democrats voted with all Republicans in the House to pass the resolution.

=== Peru ===
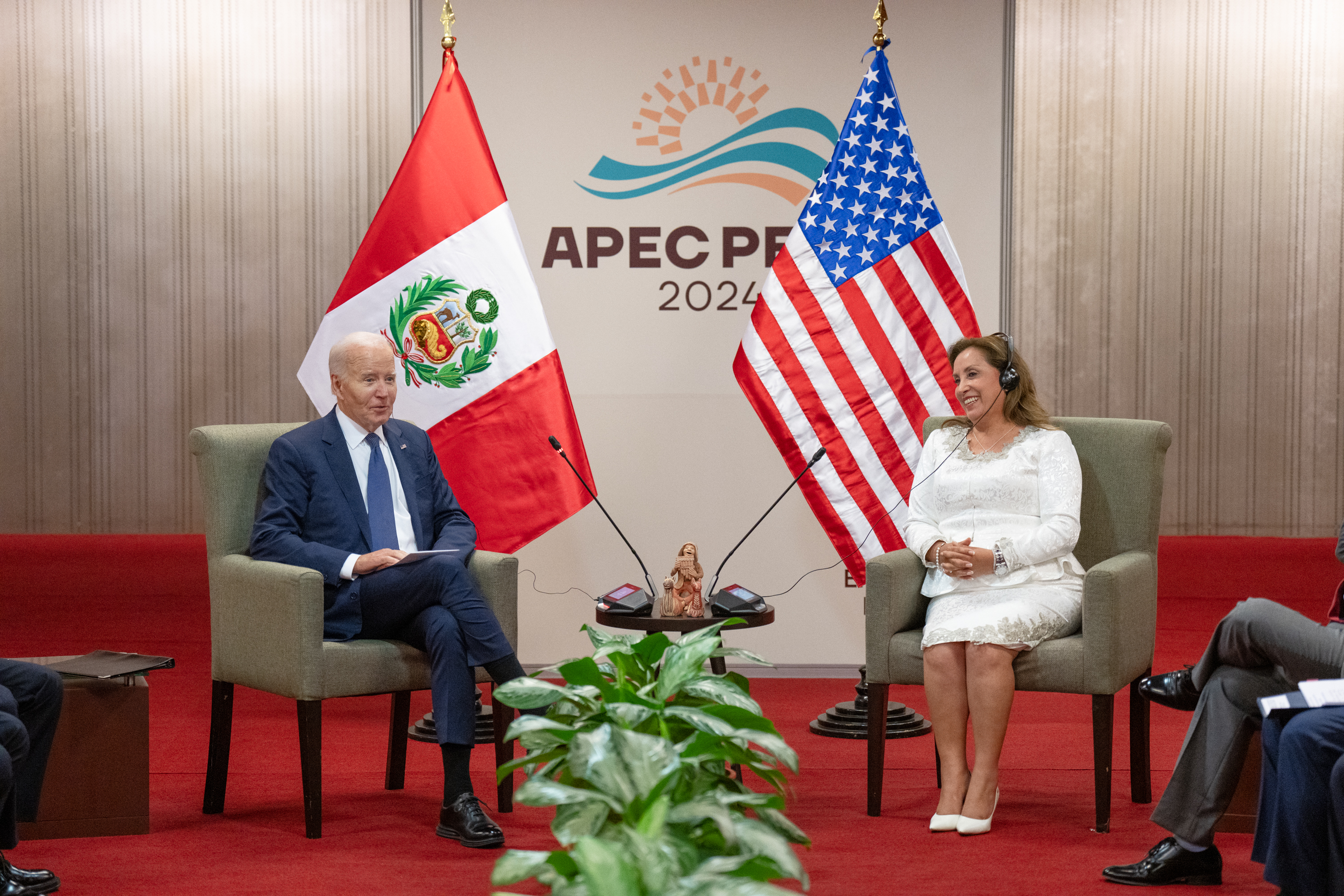
Biden and Peruvian President Dina Boluarte, November 2024

Biden received substantial criticism due to his administration's open support for Peruvian President Dina Boluarte, whose government has been described as authoritarian.

=== Venezuela ===
Regarding crisis in Venezuela, Biden continued the U.S.' recognition of opposition leader Juan Guaidó as the legitimate president of Venezuela, and continued declining to negotiate with President Nicolás Maduro. The U.S. State Department claimed that "Maduro is a dictator" and that the regime's repression and corruption created a humanitarian catastrophe. The administration indicated that it would not lift U.S. sanctions on Venezuela but would consider it if Maduro negotiated with the opposition. The administration continued support for humanitarian aid to Venezuela. In March 2021, the administration granted Temporary Protected Status for an 18-month period to Venezuelans who were already living in the U.S., having fled the Maduro regime due to the country's economic collapse and repression.

== Europe ==
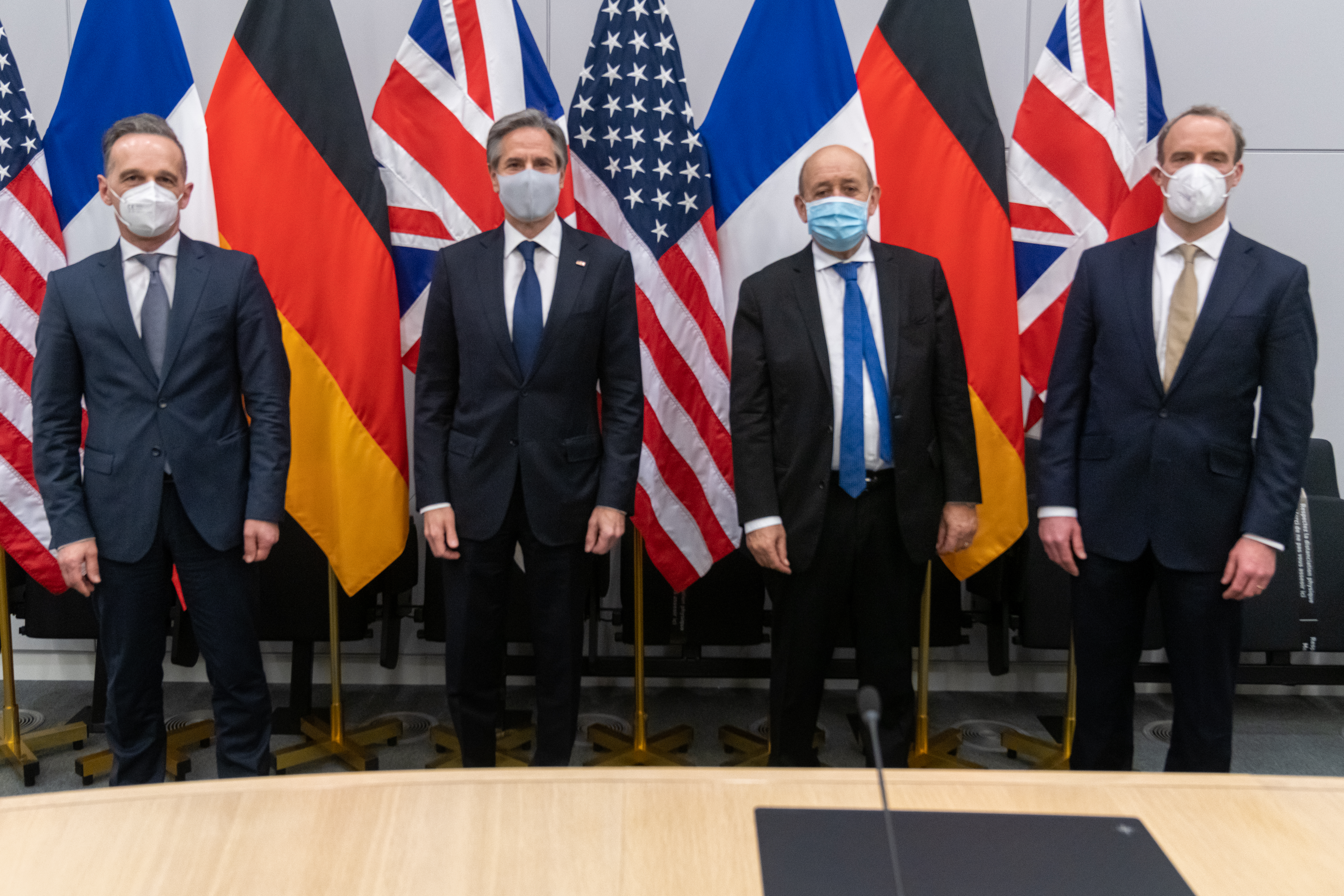
Secretary of State Antony Blinken, British Foreign Secretary Dominic Raab, French Foreign Minister Jean-Yves Le Drian, and German Foreign Minister Heiko Maas in Brussels, March 2021

=== Belarus ===
In May 2021, the U.S. denounced Belarus for forcing Ryanair Flight 4978 to land within Belorussian borders.

In February 2022, the U.S. suspended its embassy in Belarus following intelligence from Ukraine that the country was preparing to join with its ally Russia in invading Ukraine.

=== European Union ===
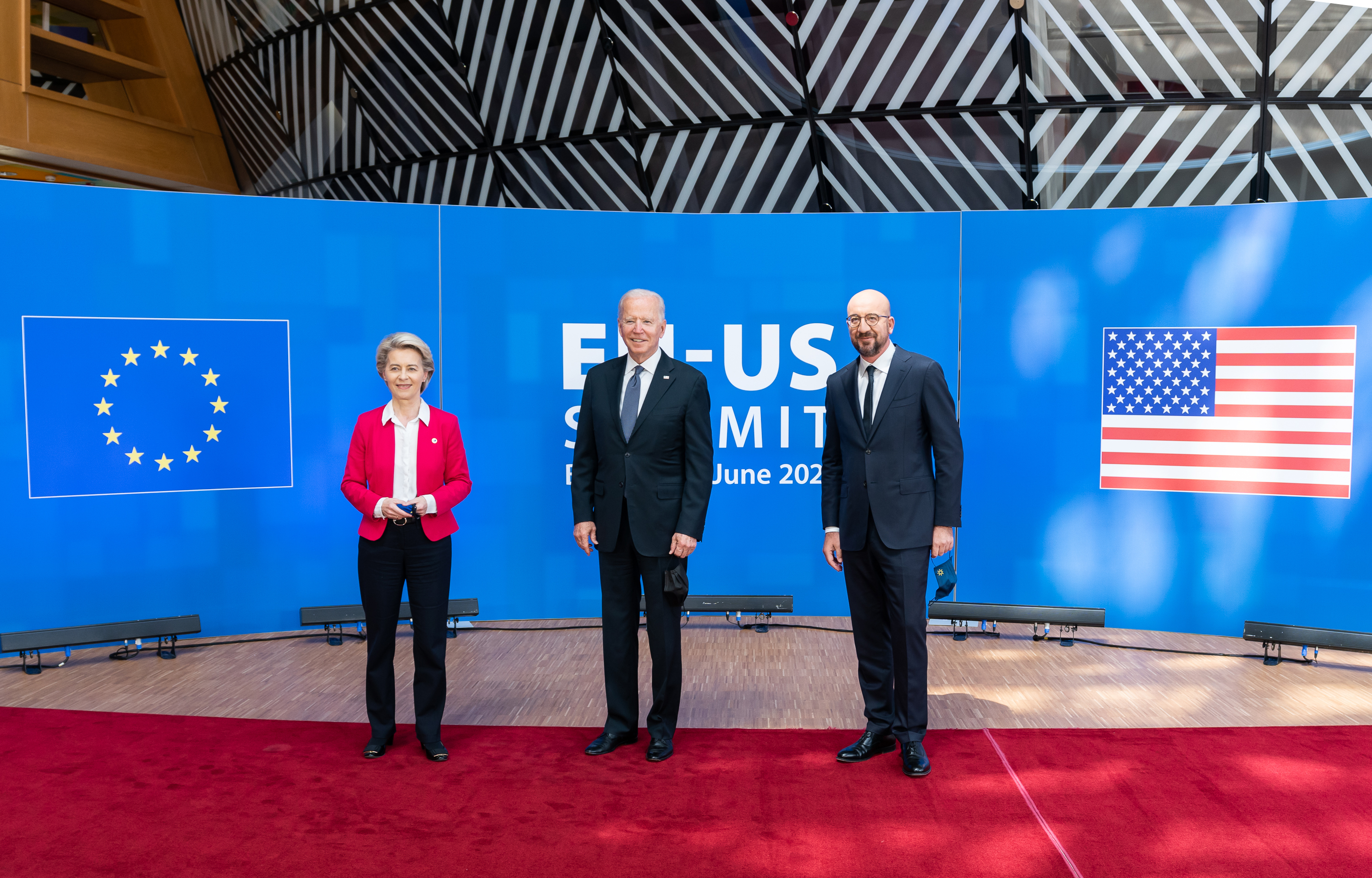
Biden with European Council President Charles Michel and European Commission President Ursula von der Leyen, June 2021

Biden spoke of bilateral relations, bolstering transatlantic relations through NATO and the European Union, and closely coordinating on key issues, such as Iran, China, Russia, Afghanistan, climate change, the COVID-19 pandemic and multilateral organizations.

Biden promised to repair the U.S.' "strained" European alliances, in contrast to Trump. At the Munich Security Conference, Biden warned that "Putin seeks to weaken the European project and our NATO alliance." He claimed that strengthening NATO would help void the pandemic and climate change.

However, in late 2022 and 2023, the Biden administration implemented the CHIPS and Science Act (partly to counter the European Chips Act) and Inflation Reduction Act, both of which included measures to improve the U.S. domestic research sector, build domestic supply chains, and increase business and consumer tax incentives solely for American-made semiconductors, renewable energy, and electric vehicles, among others. The EU member states' finance ministers complained about these measures, claiming the United States is implementing harmful protectionist measures. The European Commission has responded by proposing the Net Zero Industry Act as part of the European Green Deal. Biden and President of the European Commission Ursula von der Leyen agreed in 2023 to negotiate a common critical minerals stockpile deal and reforms to their respective green industrial policy packages.

=== Finland ===
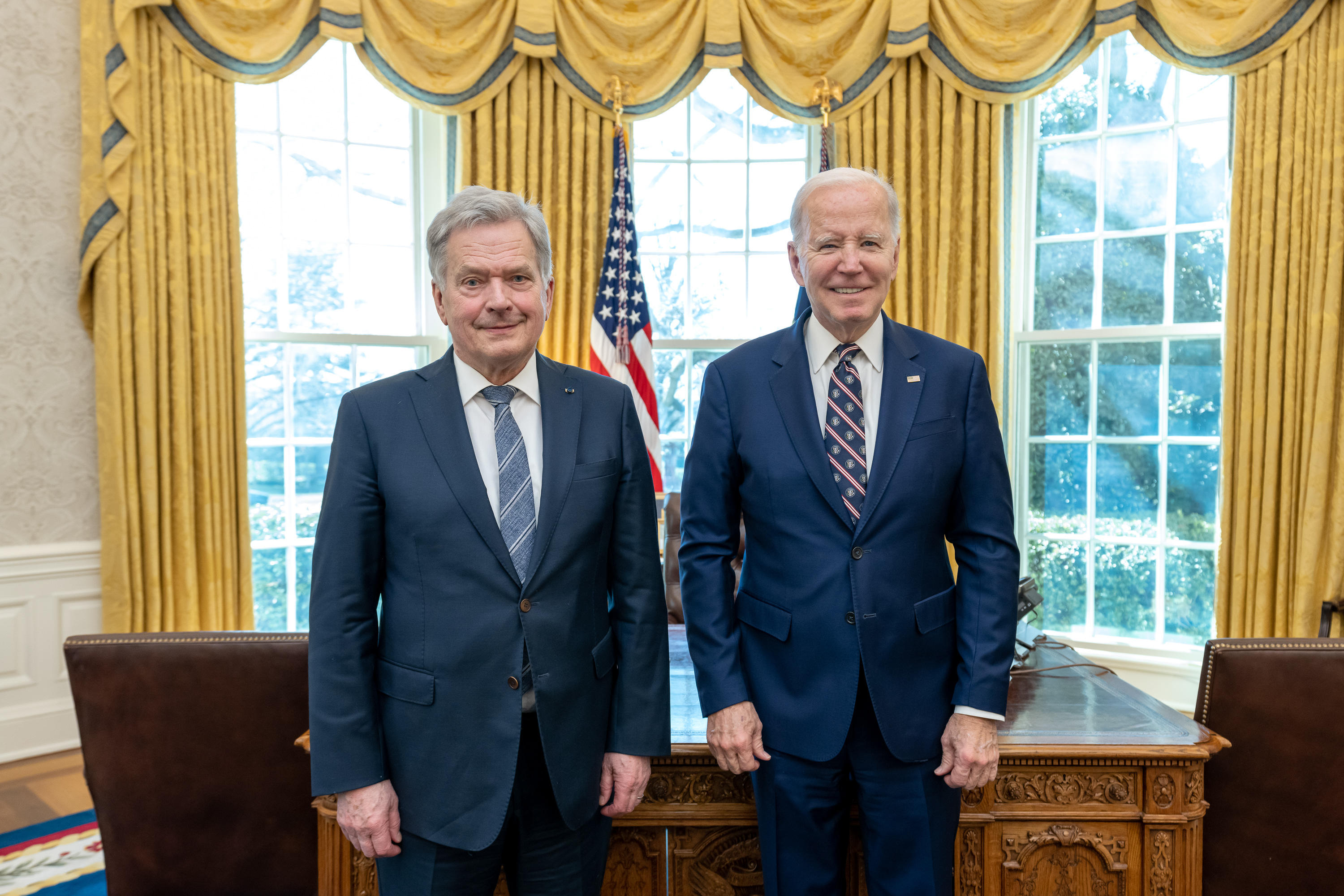
Biden and Finnish president Sauli Niinistö in 2023

In August 2022, the U.S. Senate and Biden unanimously approved Finland and Sweden's accession bids to join NATO. Biden visited Helsinki in July 2023 to celebrate Finland joining NATO, and met with Finnish President Sauli Niinistö.

In December 2023, the U.S. and Finland signed a Defense Cooperation Agreement (DCA) in Washington, D.C. The agreement regulates the presence of the US armed forces and their dependents on the territory of Finland, as well as the presence and activities of US suppliers on the territory of Finland.

At the 2024 NATO summit, it was decided that the U.S., Canada and Finland would form the ICE Pact, in which Finland will serve as the majority builder of icebreaker vessels.

=== France ===
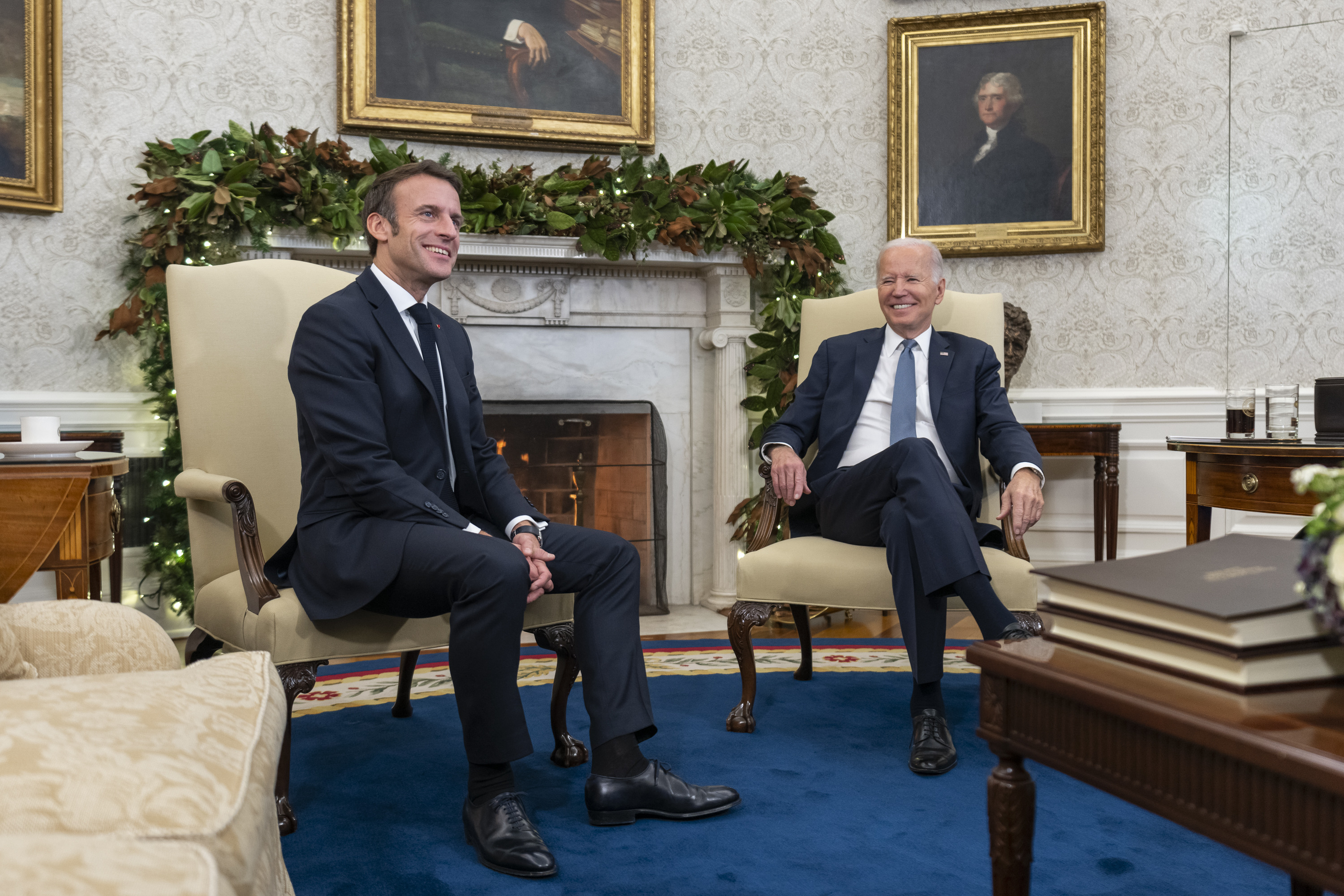
Biden and French president Emmanuel Macron in 2022

In September 2021, the French ambassador was recalled to Paris after the AUKUS security pact had been made by Australia, the U.K., and the U.S. The measure was unprecedented; in almost 250 years of diplomatic relations, France had never before recalled its U.S. ambassadorship. The Biden administration tried to placate French anger.

In October 2021, Biden met with Macron and admitted that his administration was "clumsy" in its handling of the nuclear submarine deal with Australia, which had deprived France of billions in defense contracts.

=== Germany ===
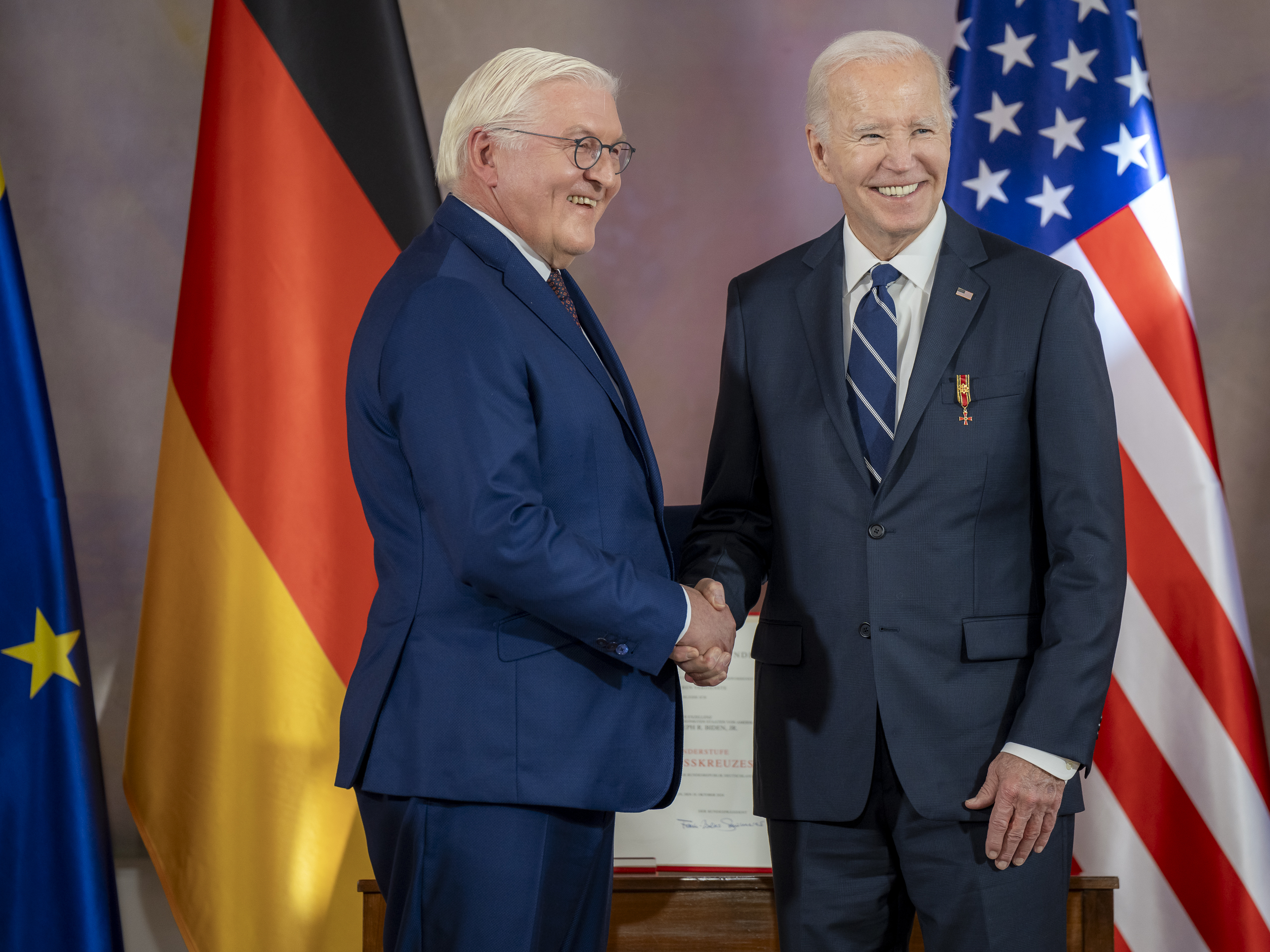
Biden and German president Frank-Walter Steinmeier in 2024

In 2021, Biden froze the Trump administration's withdrawal of 9,500 troops from U.S. military bases in Germany, This was welcomed by Germany, which said that the move "serves European and transatlantic security".

=== Greece and Cyprus ===
Antony Blinken indicated American interest in robust ties between itself, Greece, Israel, and Cyprus, in response to questioning by Senate Foreign Relations Committee chair Bob Menendez regarding the Eastern Mediterranean Security and Energy Partnership Act. In October 2021, Greece and the U.S. upgraded their defense pact, signing an agreement that allowed expanded access for U.S. troops to train and operate from four additional bases in Greece indefinitely. Greece also maintained a bilateral maritime defense pact with France, and the parties hold these pacts to be complementary to NATO.

=== Ireland ===
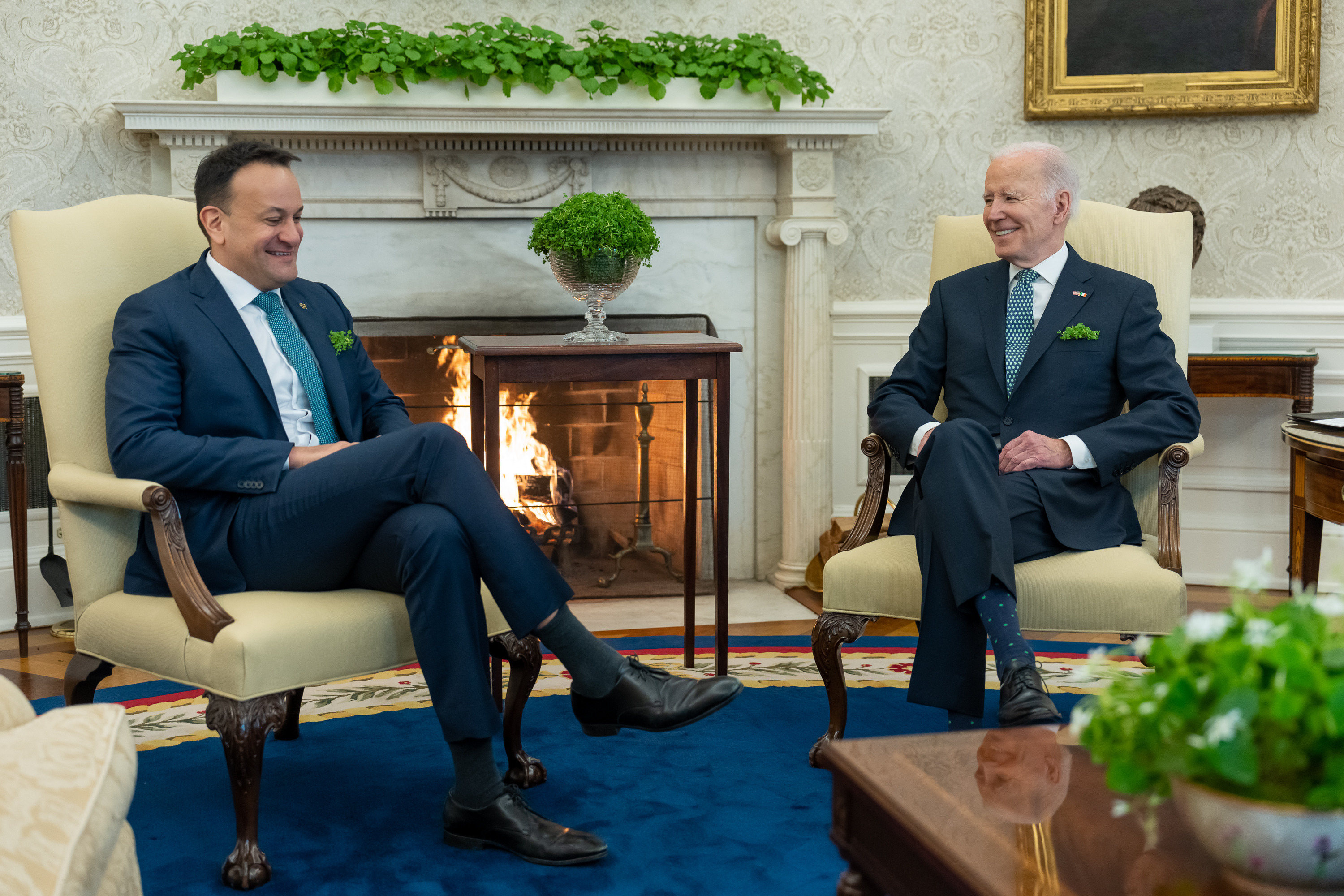
Biden and Irish Taoiseach Leo Varadkar in 2023

In March 2021, Biden virtually spoke to Irish Taoiseach Micheál Martin, and discussed COVID-19, security issues, and Northern Ireland. Biden emphasized his support for the Good Friday Agreement. Martin later said that "[Biden's] election was greeted with great affection and warmth". Biden visited Ireland in April 2023, and met with President Michael D. Higgins and Taoiseach Leo Varadkar, and addressed the Oireachtas soon after. Biden focused on the Good Friday Agreement's continuation, trade, tech and industrial policy, security issues, the Russo-Ukrainian war, and European Union-U.S. relations. Biden also toured the various Irish towns where his ancestors lived and met with distant cousins.

=== Kosovo and Serbia ===
In February 2021, Biden sent letters to Kosovo's acting President Vjosa Osmani and Serbian President Aleksandar Vučić, urging the normalization of Kosovo–Serbia relations based on "mutual recognition" and expressing support for economic normalization agreements; Biden's engagement with the issue signaled a new U.S. focus on European security. Biden said recognition of Kosovo was necessary for normalization of Serbia–U.S. relations.

=== Lithuania ===
In July 2023, Lithuania hosted 2023 Vilnius summit, receiving Biden and many other leaders. During the visit, Biden gave a speech in Vilnius University.

=== Netherlands ===
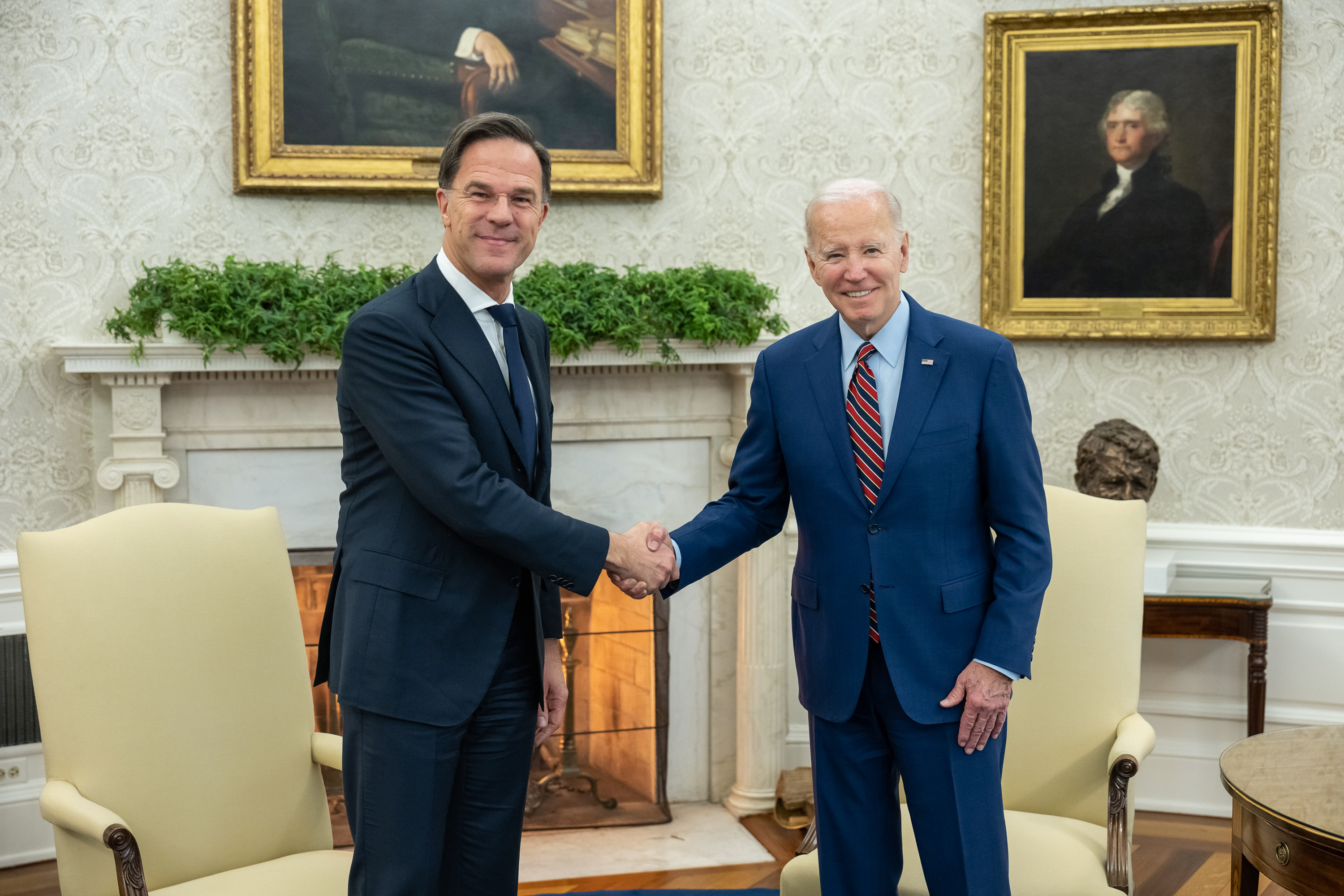
Biden and Dutch prime minister Mark Rutte in 2023

In August 2023, as part of the agreement, the United States approved delivery of F-16 fighter jets from the Netherlands to Ukraine. In 2024, the Netherlands and the U.S. entered into security agreements with Ukraine in response to the Russian invasion of Ukraine as part of a larger NATO initiative to support Ukraine with ammunition and weapons systems. The appointment of Mark Rutte as Secretary General of NATO was favored by Biden.

=== Poland ===
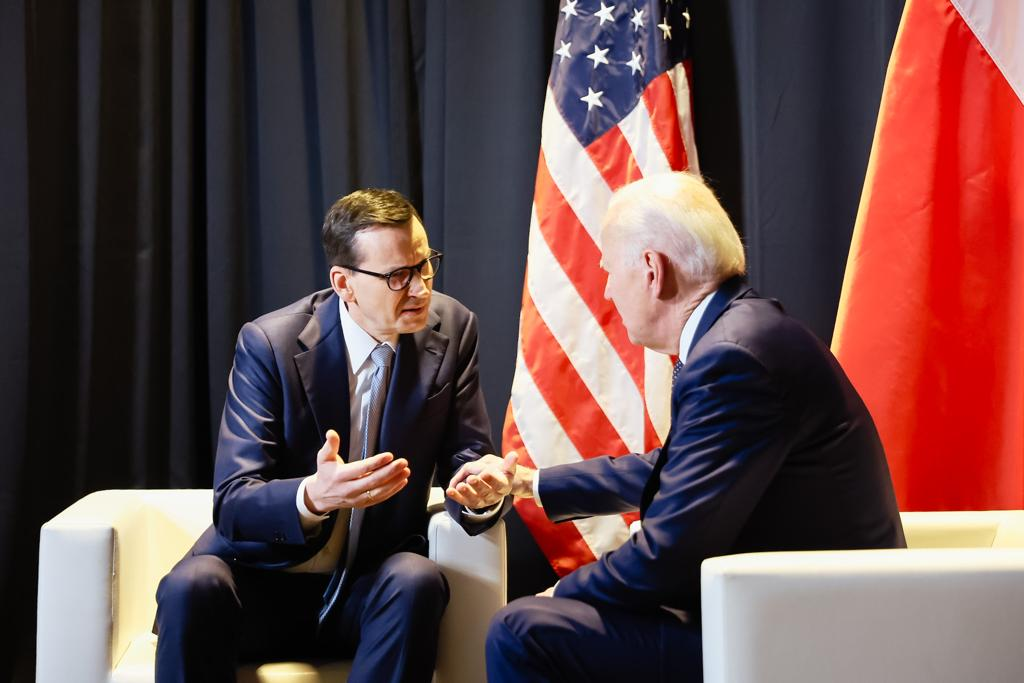
Biden and Polish Prime Minister Mateusz Morawiecki, February 2023

Biden visited Poland in March 2022, where he talked with Polish leaders and met Ukrainian refugees. He also delivered a speech in the courtyard of Royal Castle in Warsaw. He referred to the historical experiences of Poland, the Russian-Ukrainian war and the aggressive policy of Russia. The purpose of Biden's trip to Poland was to express NATO's unity and the U.S. commitment to defend its allies.

=== Romania ===
In 2024, the US Government informed its Romanian counterpart that the Romanian Armed Forces could now access funds for the modernization programs through the Foreign Military Financing program. Under this program, the Romanian side can access up to 4 billion dollars in direct loans as well as up to 8 billion dollars attracted by contracting loans from the financial markets.

Romania joined the Visa Waiver Program on January 10, 2025.

=== Russia ===
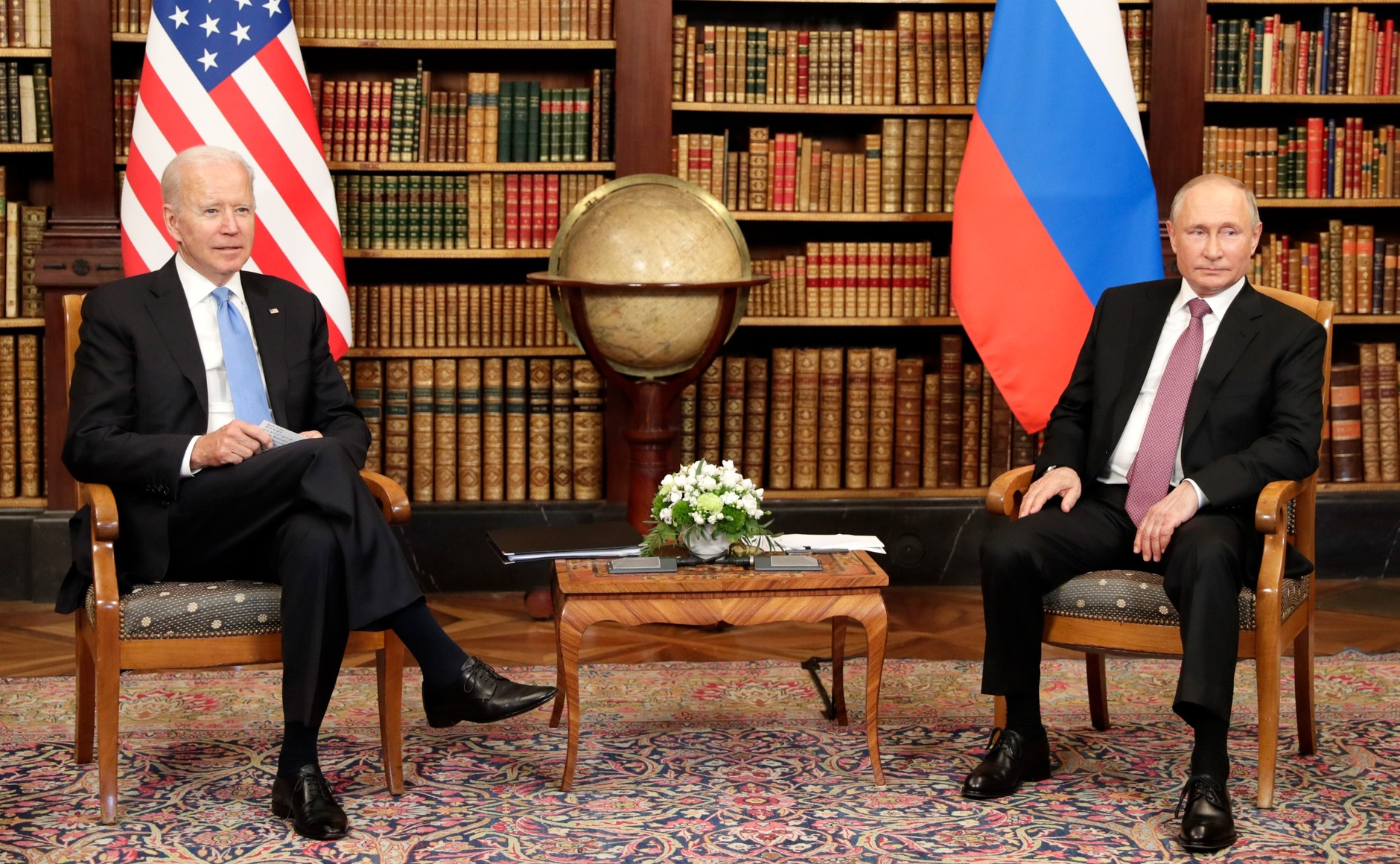
Biden and Russian President Vladimir Putin at the summit meeting in Geneva, June 2021

The United States intelligence community has found that Russian intelligence actors have been spreading narratives of alleged corruption about Biden, his family, and Ukraine since at least 2014.

On the day of Biden's inauguration, the Russian government urged the new U.S. administration to take a "more constructive" approach in talks over the extension of the 2010 New START treaty, the sole remaining agreement limiting the number of U.S. and Russian long-range nuclear warheads. In Biden's first telephone call as president with Russian President Vladimir Putin, on January 26, 2021, Biden and Putin agreed to extend the New START treaty (which was set to expire in February 2021) by an additional five years.

Biden and his administration condemned human rights violations by the Russian authorities, calling for the release of detained dissident and anti-corruption activist Alexei Navalny, his wife, and the thousands of Russians who had demonstrated in his support; the U.S. called for the unconditional release of Navalny and the protestors and a credible investigation into Navalny's poisoning. In March 2021, the U.S. and European Union imposed coordinated additional sanctions on Russian officials, as well as the FSB and GRU, over Navalny's poisoning and imprisonment. The State Department also expanded existing sanctions from the Chemical and Biological Weapons Control and Warfare Elimination Act that had been imposed after the poisoning of Skripal.

The Biden administration was also planning to impose sanctions against Russia over the 2020 SolarWinds cyberespionage campaign, which compromised the computer systems of nine federal agencies. Biden's national security adviser Jake Sullivan said that the response "will include a mix of tools seen and unseen, and it will not simply be sanctions."

Video conference call between Vladimir Putin and Joe Biden, December 2021

The Biden administration's comprehensive review into Russian activities included an examination of reports that the Russian government offered to Taliban-linked fighters to kill U.S. troops in Afghanistan.

In March 2021, a DNI report on the 2020 U.S. federal elections was declassified. It had confirmed that both the governments of Russia and Iran had been attempting to influence the 2020 United States elections, with Putin approving the operation of influencing the elections. Although no evidence was found of any votes, ballots, or registrations being directly changed by foreign actors, the assessment did find that Russian efforts were aimed at "denigrating President Biden's candidacy and the Democratic Party, supporting former President Trump, undermining public confidence in the electoral process, and exacerbating sociopolitical divisions in the US". On the following day, Biden commented on the new information in an interview with ABC News that Putin will "pay a price", also labeling Putin a "killer".

Meeting with NATO allies in Brussels two days before his scheduled June 2021 summit meeting with Russian president Vladimir Putin, Biden refuted an assertion by Ukrainian president Volodymyr Zelenskyy that NATO had agreed to admit Ukraine to the alliance. Ukrainian allegiance was a persistently contentious issue between Russia and the United States.

Speaking to American military personnel in Britain en route to the summit, Biden said, "We're not seeking conflict with Russia. We want a stable predictable relationship. I've been clear: the United States will respond in a robust and meaningful way if the Russian government engages in harmful activities." He added he would "meet with Mr. Putin to let him know what I want him to know."

Following the meeting, Biden stated to reporters that he warned Putin that the U.S. would use offensive cyber operations if Russia did not crack down on cyber attacks against "critical infrastructure."

In May 2021, the Biden administration waived sanctions against the Russian-owned Nord Stream 2 pipeline. In August 2021, the Biden administration imposed new specific sanctions on a Russian ship (Ostap Sheremeta) and two companies involved in the Nord Stream 2, while issuing an executive order that would allow for sanctions to be imposed on certain pipelines.

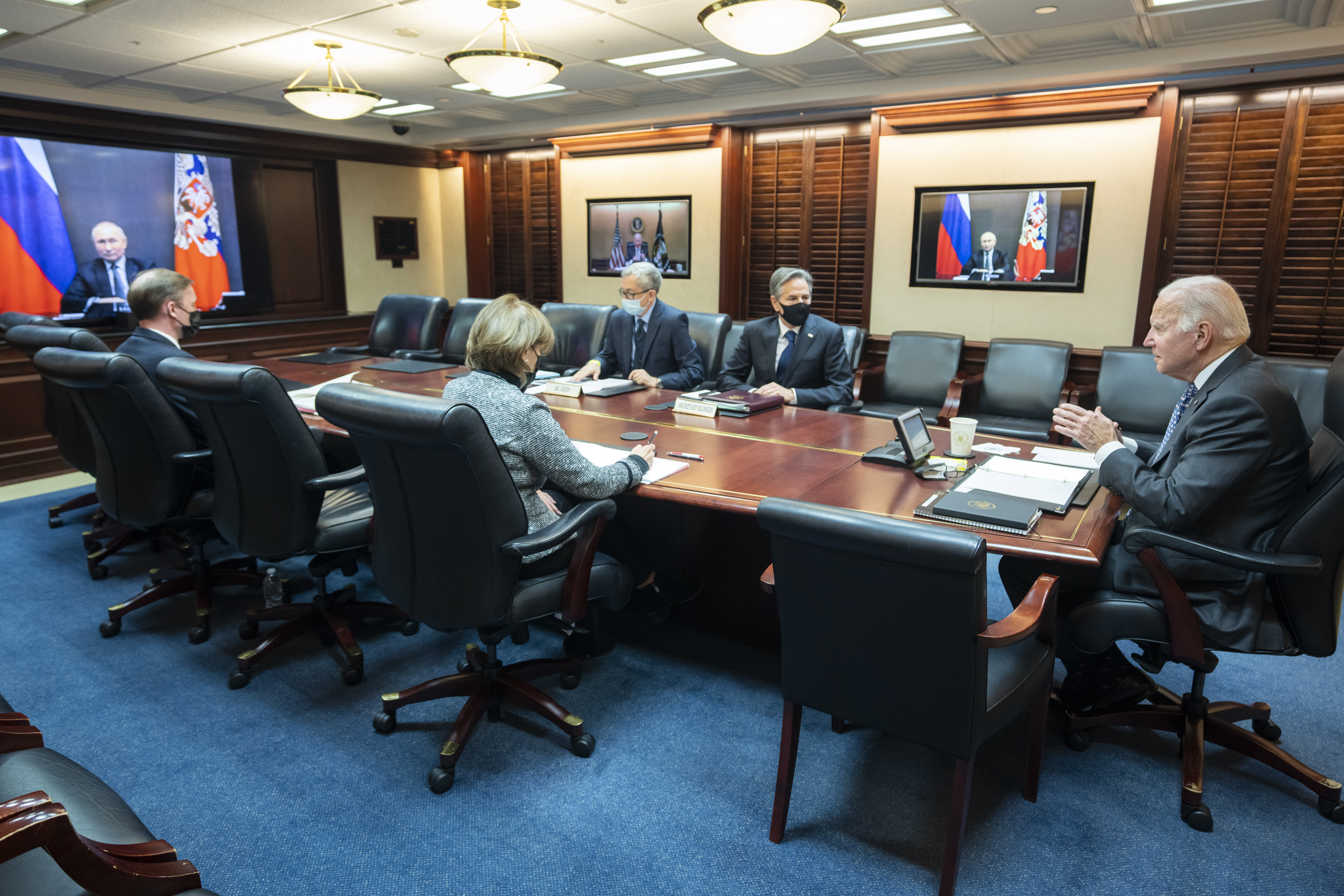
Biden holds a video call with Russian President Vladimir Putin, December 2021

President Biden delivers remarks on Russia's invasion of Ukraine

The 2021–2022 crisis between Russia and Ukraine, which involved Russian troops building up along the border, resulted in renewed tensions between Russia and NATO. In December 2021, Biden and Putin discussed the crisis over the course of a 50-minute phone call. Bilateral talks began in Geneva in January 2022, to discuss concerns about Ukraine and Russia's concern of NATO posturing in Eastern Europe. The talks were led by U.S. Deputy Secretary of State Wendy Sherman. Biden warned of a "distinct possibility" Russia would invade Ukraine. One week before the invasion, Biden said there was a "very high" risk Russia would invade, and Blinken spoke at a United Nations Security Council meeting, saying he wants to prevent a war, which he believed would start with a manufactured pretext for Russia to invade.

Following the Russian invasion of Ukraine, Biden condemned Putin, calling him "the aggressor" and announcing additional sanctions on Russia. On February 25, the White House announced the US would personally sanction Putin and Foreign Minister Sergey Lavrov. Sanctions on Putin's inner circle were increased in multiple rounds over the following months. On February 28, the Biden administration announced sanctions against Russia's central bank, prohibiting Americans from doing business with the bank and freezing the bank's assets. Additional sets of sanctions included a ban on Russian oil and gas imports. On April 6, 2022, the White House said that the U.S., alongside the G7 and EU, had imposed "the most impactful, coordinated, and wide-ranging economic restrictions in history" and that day announced new sanctions in response to the Bucha massacre. In May, the rest of the G7 also committed to a phase-out of Russian oil. The United States blocked various Russian bank entities.

On 27 September 2022, White House press secretary Karine Jean-Pierre encouraged Russian men fleeing their home country to avoid being drafted to apply for asylum in the United States. In early 2023, the Biden administration resumed deportations of Russians who had fled Russia to avoid mobilization in the Russian invasion of Ukraine and political persecution.

In October 2023, Biden asked Congress for $61 billion in funding for Ukraine during the Russian invasion of Ukraine. Biden signed a record $886 billion defense spending bill into law on December 22, 2023.

=== Spain ===
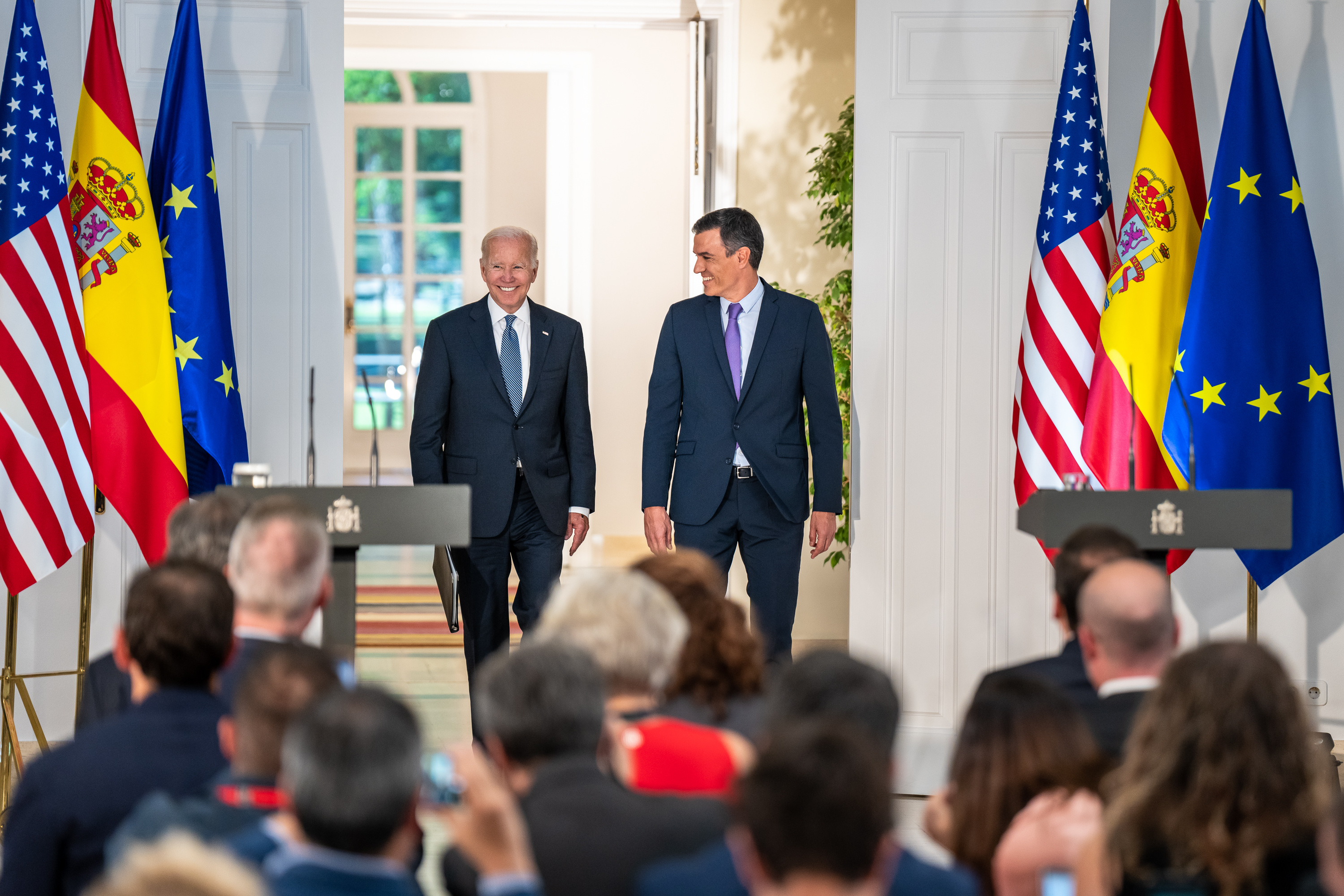
Biden and Spanish Prime Minister Pedro Sánchez, June 2022

On 28 June 2022, following a meeting of US president Joe Biden with Spanish prime minister Pedro Sánchez in La Moncloa, both leaders issued a joint declaration to enhance the relations between both countries (updating the 2001 previous joint declaration signed by Josep Piqué and Madeleine Albright), which included an agreement on increasing the number of US warships in Rota and on the importance of permanent cooperation between both countries in response to the challenges of irregular immigration in North Africa.

=== Sweden ===
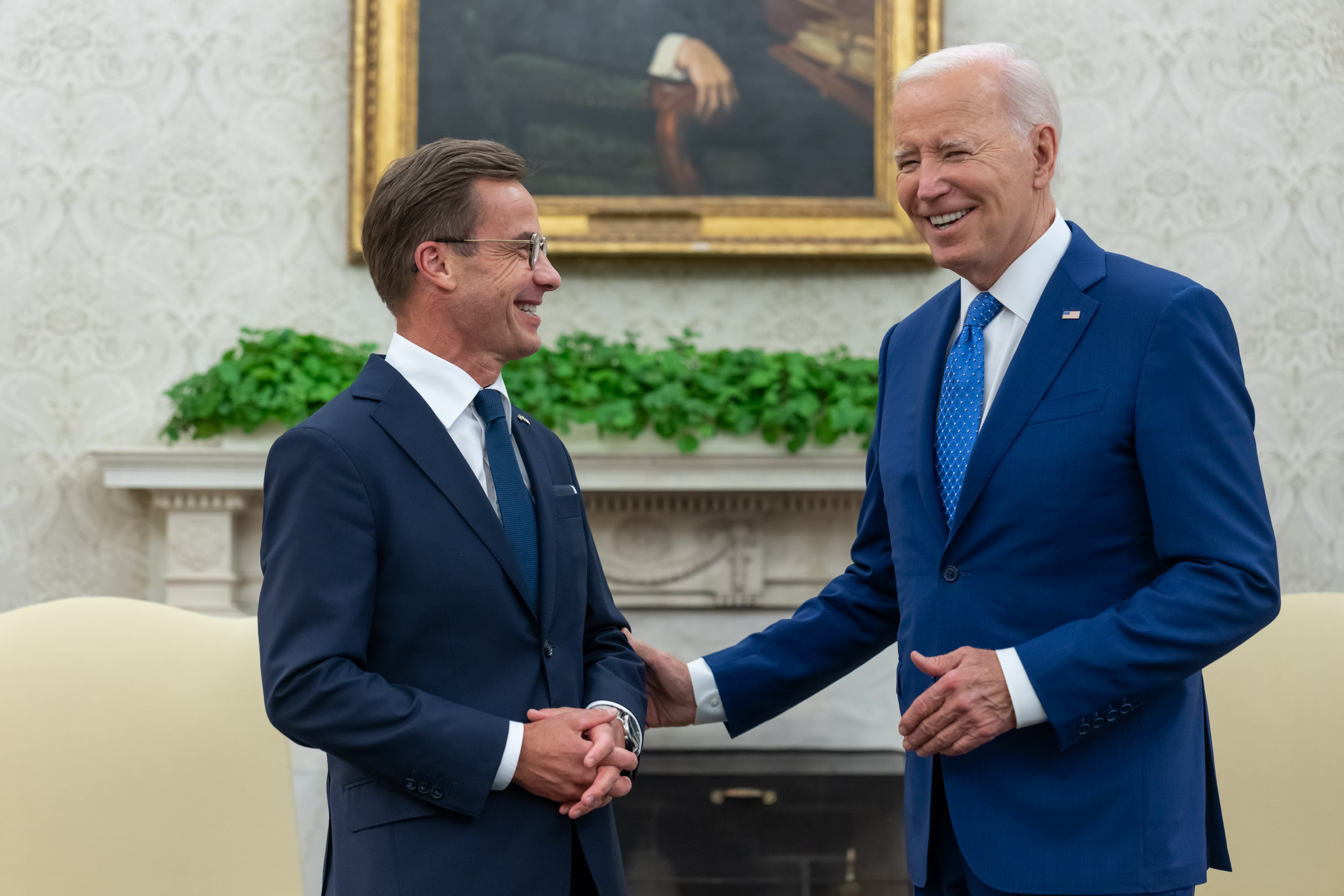
Biden and Swedish Prime Minister Ulf Kristersson, July 2023

During the Cold War, Sweden did not join NATO and maintained a neutral status between the Western and Eastern Blocs, although its democratic and mixed capitalist approach was generally more in tune with the West and the United States. After the end of the Vietnam War, which was deeply unpopular in Sweden, relations between the two countries improved. The two countries have been largely friendly, and the United States supported Sweden's NATO membership. Under a comprehensive mandate, Sweden's nonalignment policy has led it to serve as the protecting power for the United States and to represent Washington in North Korea on consular matters. On 3 August 2022, the U.S. Senate unanimously approved Finland and Sweden's accession bids to join NATO. President Biden approved the NATO membership of Finland and Sweden in August 2022.

Sweden's accession into NATO was finalized on 7 March 2024. The United States has observer status with the regional BEAC and CBSS.

=== Ukraine ===
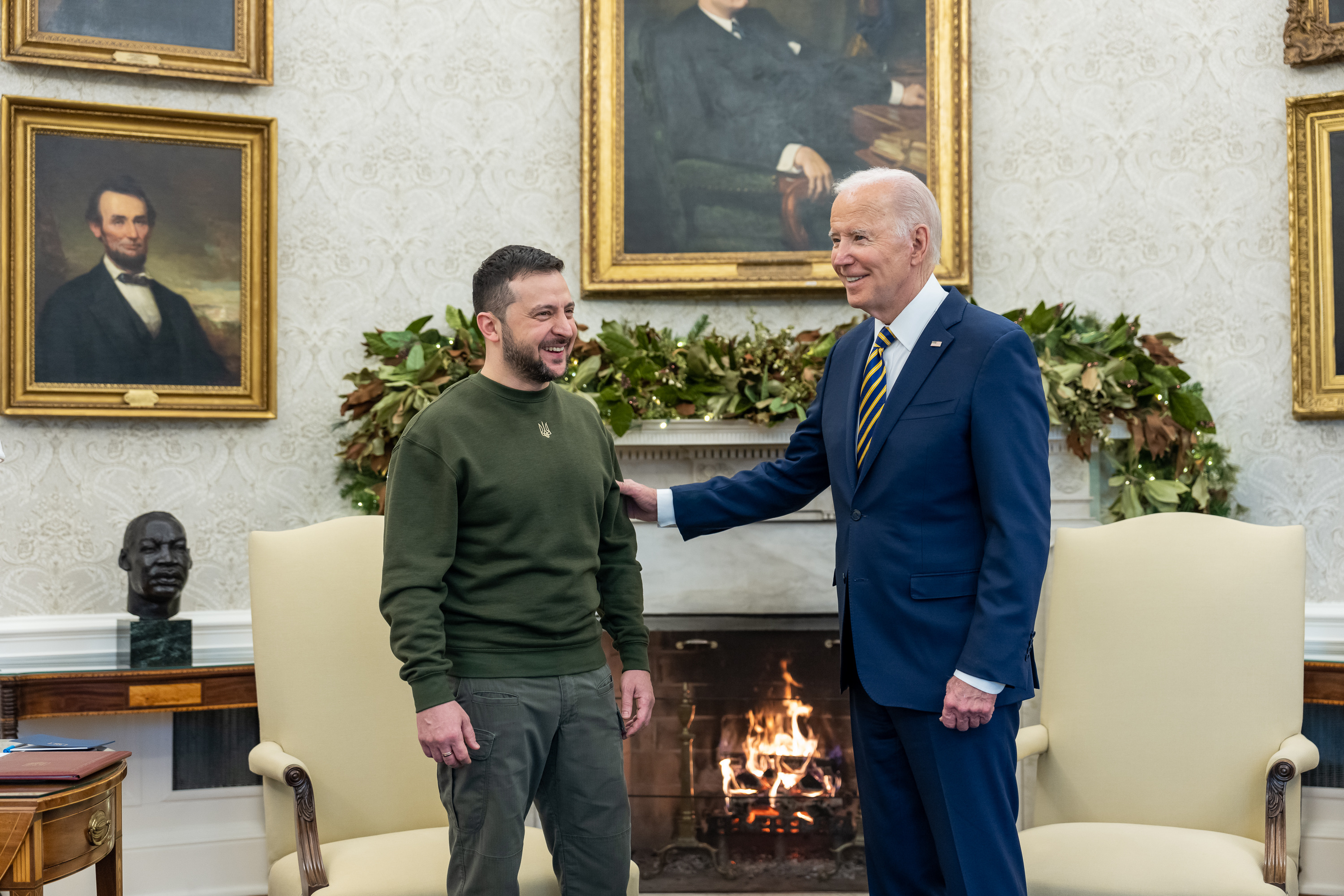
Biden and Ukrainian President Volodymyr Zelenskyy in Washington, D.C., December 2022

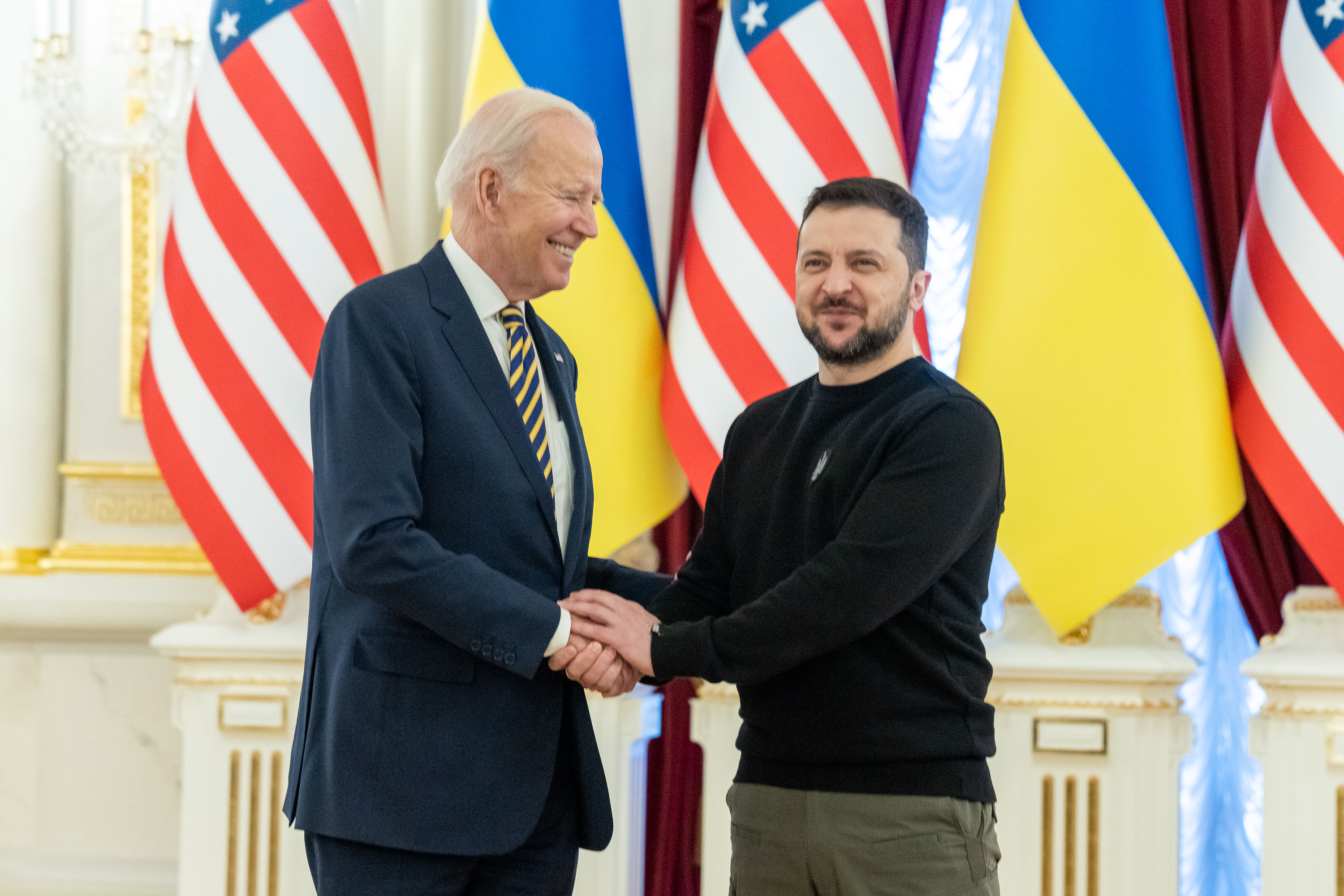
Biden and Ukrainian President Volodymyr Zelenskyy in Kyiv, February 2023

Biden pledged support for the sovereignty of Ukraine. Biden also opposed the Nord Stream 2 pipeline, describing it as a "bad deal for Europe". The pipeline project was criticized for the leverage it would have given to Russia in isolating Ukraine, In 2021, a joint statement of the Ukrainian and Polish governments urged Biden to take more decisive action against Nord Stream 2. During the 2021–2022 Russo-Ukrainian crisis, Biden imposed sanctions on Nord Stream 2 in retaliation against Russian troop buildups in February 2022.

Previously, in March 2021, the Biden administration announced a $125 million military aid package to Ukraine, including Mark VI patrol boats, radars, and medical equipment. On September 1, 2021, President Joe Biden and Ukrainian President Volodymyr Zelenskyy met in the White House and discussed Euro-Atlantic cooperation. Various agreements were announced by the Biden administration. An additional $60 million in U.S. aid to Ukraine was announced, bringing the yearly total to over $400 million. Ukraine and the U.S. made a joint statement on strategic cooperation. President Biden stated, "We're revitalizing the Strategic Partnership Commission between our nations." and promised to continue to provide COVID-19 vaccines to Ukraine following the 2.5 million sent. The joint statement includes points such as "The United States and Ukraine continue to oppose Nord Stream 2, which we view as a threat to European energy security", endorsed the Normandy Format, and announced cooperation on cybersecurity, satellite awareness and R&D.

Leading up to the Russian invasion, Biden repeatedly held up military aid to Ukraine, drawing frustration from Congress and the Ukrainian government. A $100 million aid package was held up in June 2021, and a $200 million package was held up in December 2021. Biden also publicly announced that his response would vary in the event of a "minor incursion" from Russia, instead of a larger invasion, harming Ukrainian confidence in the Biden administration.

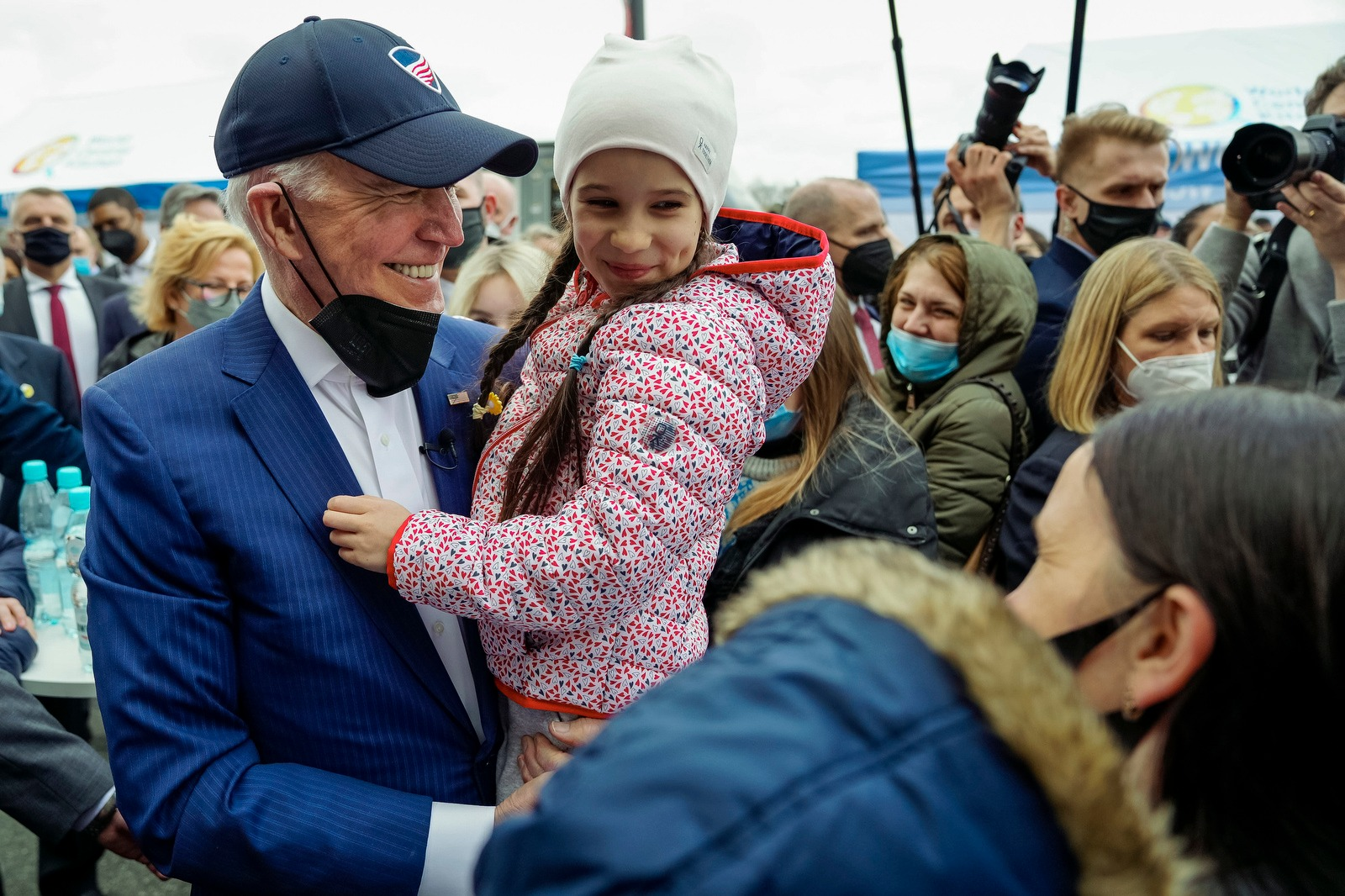
Biden with refugees from Ukraine in Warsaw, March 2022

Following the Russian invasion of Ukraine in February 2022, Biden supported defensive and humanitarian aid to Ukraine. In March 2022, Biden supported the international response against Russia and pledged to accept 100,000 Ukrainian refugees. In May, he signed the Ukraine Democracy Defense Lend-Lease Act of 2022 and a $40 billion aid package for Ukraine. From July, the Biden administration supplied HIMARS to Ukraine. On August 1, the State Department announced $550 million in security aid to Ukraine focused on supplies for HIMARS systems. In 2022, Congress approved more than $112 billion in aid to Ukraine. In July 2023, President Biden approved the provision of cluster munitions to Ukraine. In October 2023, the Biden administration requested $61.4 billion more for Ukraine.

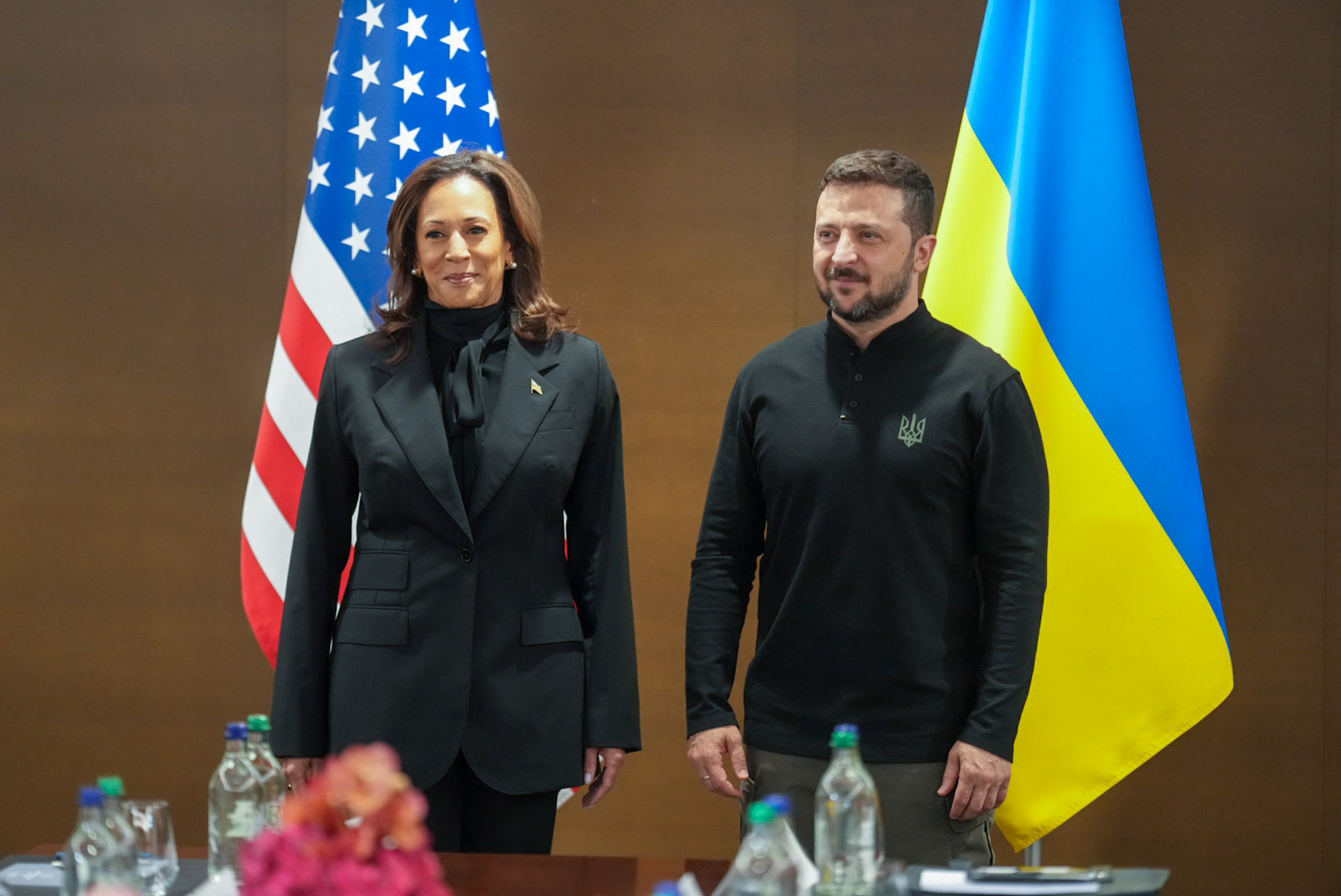
Vice President Harris and Ukrainian President Volodymyr Zelenskyy at the peace summit in Lucerne, June 2024

The Biden administration repeatedly opposed Ukraine's use of US-provided equipment against military targets within Russia, citing concerns about escalation. Deliveries of long-range ATACMS missiles were blocked for over a year due to US concerns about potential Ukrainian strikes across the Russian border, and were only allowed on the condition that they would never be used to hit targets within Russia. The US also refused to provide military intelligence to aid Ukraine in cross-border strikes. After Ukraine struck targets inside Russia using its own drones, US officials, including Vice President Kamala Harris and national security adviser Jake Sullivan, urged Ukraine to cease the attacks. Ukraine criticized the restrictions on utilizing Western-provided weapons against targets in Russian territory, with Zelenskyy saying that it was Russia's "biggest advantage" in the war. Russia utilized the restrictions on weapons usage to create safe zones for its military equipment and personnel just outside of Ukraine's borders. The restrictions have also been used by Russia to safely launch airstrikes, drone attacks, and missile strikes across its border with Ukraine, as well as its 2024 Kharkiv offensive. Ukrainian requests for exemptions to weapons restrictions have repeatedly been turned down. In June 2024, Ukraine missed an opportunity to destroy multiple Russian SU-34 fighter bombers near its border after a White House denial. In July, the Biden administration blocked a Ukrainian request to strike missile launch sites responsible for partially destroying a children's hospital in Kyiv.

In addition to restrictions on provided weaponry, the Biden administration also blocked or delayed deliveries of weapons systems altogether due to fears of escalation. Shortly before the 2022 invasion, the Biden administration blocked deliveries of Stinger and Javelin missiles, including attempted deliveries from Baltic allies. Ukraine requested F-16 fighters from the US since 2022, only receiving them in July 2024 after prior denials from the Biden administration. The US also blocked Poland from donating its own MiG-29 fighters to Ukraine over escalation fears. The Biden administration initially refused to send HIMARS to Ukraine, before allowing them after modifications were made to prevent any strikes against Russia itself. Other weapons systems that were blocked or delayed for Ukraine included Patriot surface-to-air missiles, M1 Abrams tanks, and Gray Eagle drones. Ukrainian officials criticized the halting pace of weapons deliveries as contributing to battlefield losses.

In 2022, Biden told Blinken and Secretary of Defense Austin to tone down their rhetoric after stating that the US would like to see a Ukrainian victory in its war with Russia. Multiple foreign policy analysts have questioned whether Biden wished to see Ukraine victorious, noting Biden's repeated limitations on aid sent to Ukraine's military and his ambiguous aims in the conflict.

In December 2024, Zelenskyy resisted pressure from the Biden administration to lower the conscription age to 18 to replace Ukraine's battlefield losses.

=== United Kingdom ===
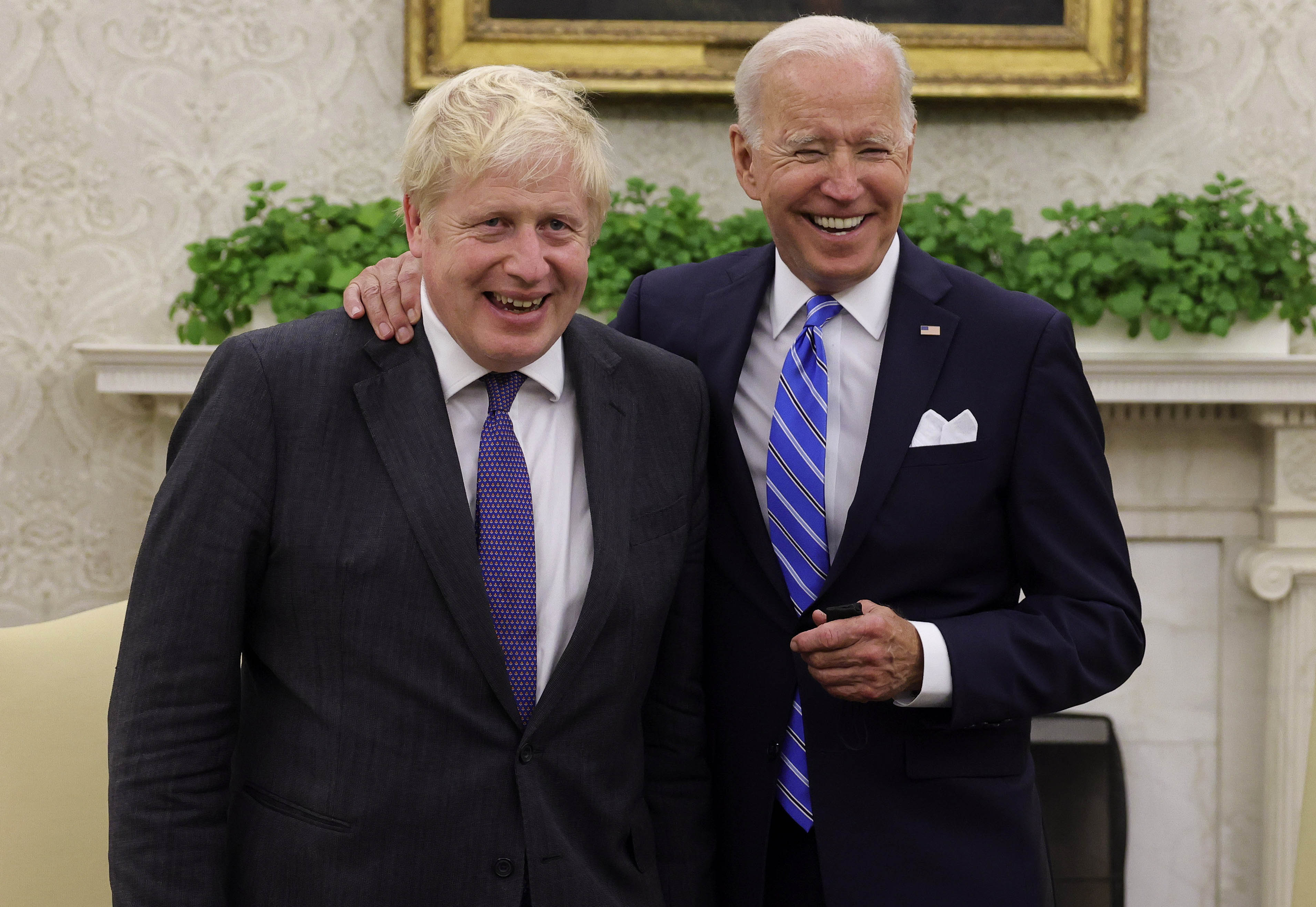
Biden and British Prime Minister Boris Johnson in 2021

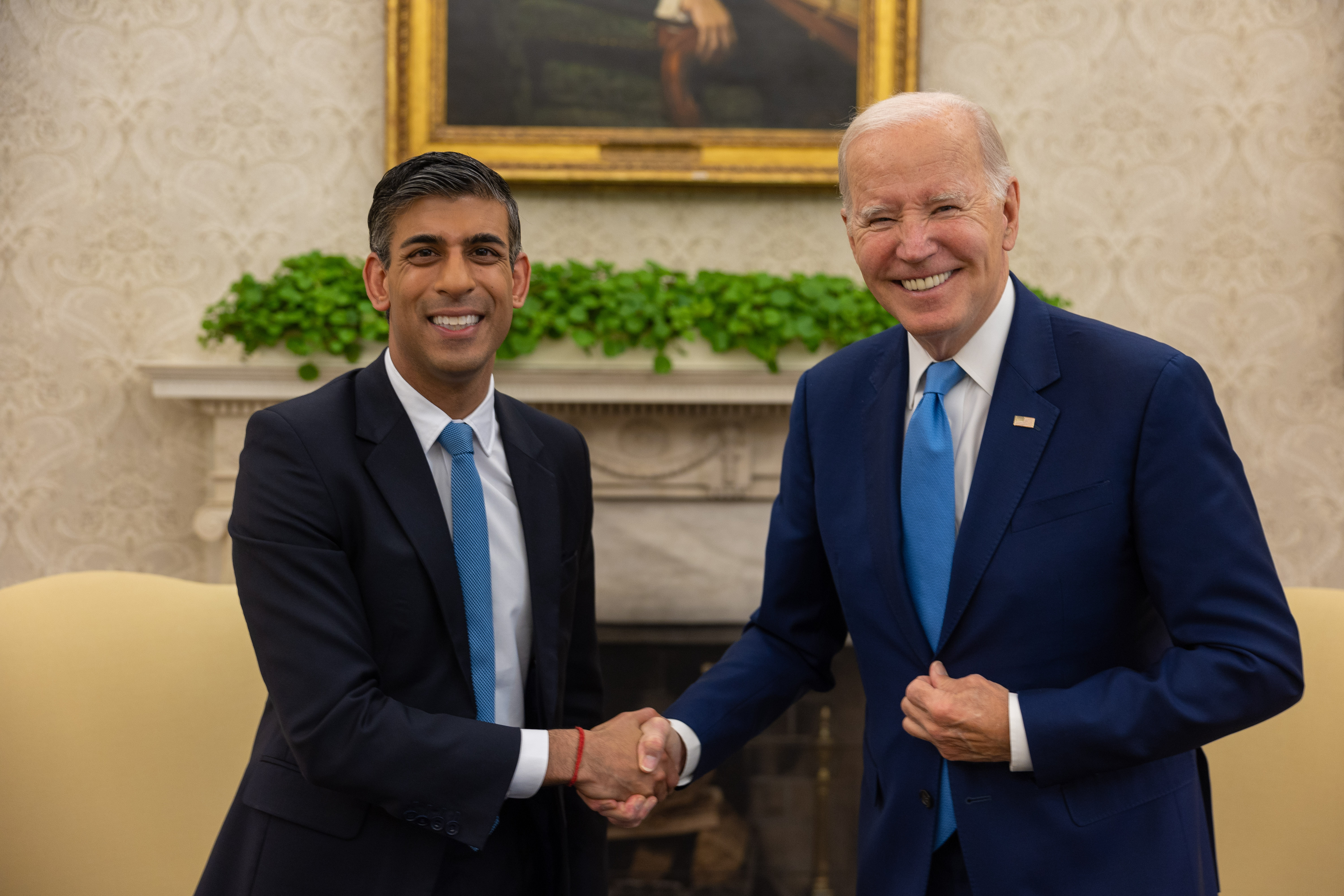
Biden and British Prime Minister Rishi Sunak in 2023

In January 2021, Biden and British Prime Minister Boris Johnson had a phone call. With the U.K. assuming control over its trade policy after the completion of Brexit and the withdrawal from the European Economic Area, Johnson pushed Biden for a new trade deal that would unite a global response to the COVID-19 pandemic. The Biden administration signaled that it was unlikely to push for a U.K.-U.S. free trade agreement (a major priority for Johnson) early on in Biden's term, as Biden expressed a desire for the U.S. to make "major investments in American workers and our infrastructure" before entering into new free trade agreements.

In June 2021, the president and the first lady met with Queen Elizabeth II at Windsor Castle while on their visit to the U.K. for the G7 Summit. The visit included a Guard of Honour and an afternoon tea with the Queen. Biden later revealed that the Queen asked about Vladimir Putin and Xi Jinping.

In July 2023, President Biden visited the UK, holding meetings with Prime Minister Rishi Sunak and King Charles III. Discussions centered around climate change and strengthening NATO, while controversy arose over the US decision to supply cluster munitions to Ukraine, which are banned in many NATO countries.

==== New Atlantic Charter ====
In June 2021, Biden and Boris Johnson issued the New Atlantic Charter, based on the doctrine of New Atlanticism, while in Cornwall, England. The White House described it as a version of the two countries' 1941 Atlantic Charter which would meet the "new challenges of the 21st century".

==== Northern Ireland ====
Biden routinely iterated his commitment to maintaining peace in Northern Ireland by resisting the possibility of a hard border as a result of Brexit. When asked by The Irish Times in March 2021 about comments made by Irish foreign minister Simon Coveney that the U.K. "cannot be trusted" on the Northern Ireland Protocol, White House press secretary Jen Psaki stated that "President Biden has been unequivocal about his support for the Good Friday Agreement". As part of his own Irish-American heritage, Psaki stated that Biden "has a special place in his heart for the Irish" underpinning his commitment to Northern Ireland's peace.

In April 2023, Biden visited Belfast, where he gave a speech to students at the new Ulster University campus there, and met with the new Prime Minister, Rishi Sunak, to discuss continuing the Good Friday Agreement on its 25th anniversary and improving U.K.–U.S. economic relations.

== East Asia ==
=== China ===
==== Early policy direction ====
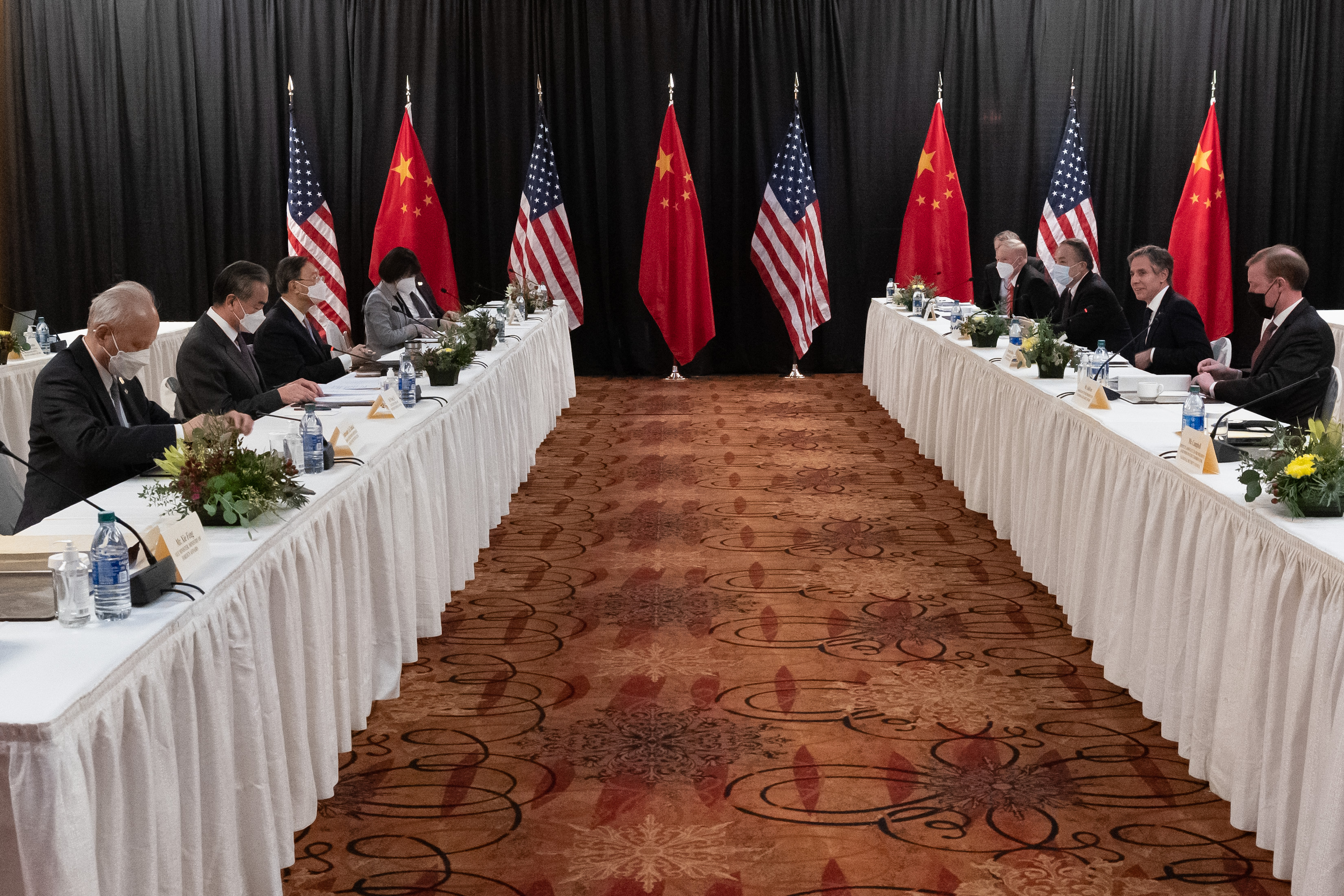
U.S. and Chinese officials meeting in Alaska in 2021

Despite previously advocating a policy of engagement with China, on taking office, Biden largely continued the China policies of his predecessor Donald Trump. He criticized China's government for being "deeply authoritarian", stealing "over 1 million" manufacturing jobs from Americans, breaking international trade regulations, unfairly subsidizing Chinese corporations, and stealing intellectual property from U.S. firms and discriminating against them. Tariffs imposed by Trump on the PRC remained in place, and Treasury Secretary Janet Yellen said the administration would use the United States' "full array of tools" against "abusive" Chinese practices.

On the day of Biden's inauguration, China announced sanctions against Mike Pompeo and 27 other former officials who worked under the Trump presidency. An NSC spokesperson called the sanctions "unproductive and cynical". This followed Pompeo's declaration, as Secretary of State under Donald Trump, that China was committing genocide against the Uyghurs. The Biden campaign had endorsed this position in August 2020, and Blinken had reaffirmed this during his nomination hearing.

Shortly after his inauguration, Biden said that the U.S. needed to "get tough" on China and build "a united front of U.S. allies and partners to confront China's abusive behaviors and human rights violations." Biden had previously said that he had spent more time in private meetings with Chinese Communist Party leader Xi Jinping than any other world leader. He criticized Xi as "a guy who doesn't have a democratic bone in his body. This is a guy who is a thug."

Biden nominated Antony Blinken as Secretary of State; he took office on January 26, 2021. During his nomination hearing, Blinken characterized China as a "techno-autocracy" seeking world dominance, and said that previous optimistic approaches to China were flawed. He stated that Biden's predecessor, Donald Trump, had been correct to adopt a firmer stance toward China, although he strongly disagreed with how Trump handled several aspects of it. He also indicated support for welcoming political refugees from Hong Kong. Furthermore, he stated that the Biden administration's commitment to Taiwan's defense would "absolutely endure", and that an attack from China on Taiwan "would be a grievous mistake on their part". The representative of Taiwan in the United States Hsiao Bi-khim (the country's de facto ambassador) was invited to attend Biden's presidential inauguration, becoming the first Taiwanese representative to attend a U.S. presidential ceremony. Taiwan is one of the main flashpoints in U.S.-China conflicts.

==== Diplomatic engagements and human rights ====
I said that the United States' relationship with China will be competitive where it should be, collaborative where it can be, adversarial where it must be. — U.S. Secretary of State Antony Blinken, bilateral talks at the Captain Cook Hotel in Anchorage, Alaska, on March 18, 2021,

The first high-level talks between the Biden administration and China were held in Anchorage, Alaska on March 19, 2021. Participants included Blinken and national security advisor Jake Sullivan from the U.S. side, and the Chinese Communist Party Politburo member and highest-ranking diplomat Yang Jiechi and foreign minister Wang Yi from the Chinese side. The public meeting was contentious, with Blinken and Sullivan raising questions on China's human rights records, cyberattacks, its threats against Taiwan, its crackdown in Xinjiang and Hong Kong, and other issues of U.S. interest. The Chinese side responded that the United States had no standing to lecture it, is no model for others, and that China's rise cannot be stopped. Yang further accused the U.S. of "inciting other countries to attack China" to which Sullivan responded by saying Washington would always support its allies. In the week ahead of the talks, the administration met with U.S. allies in Asia and imposed sanctions on senior Chinese officials.

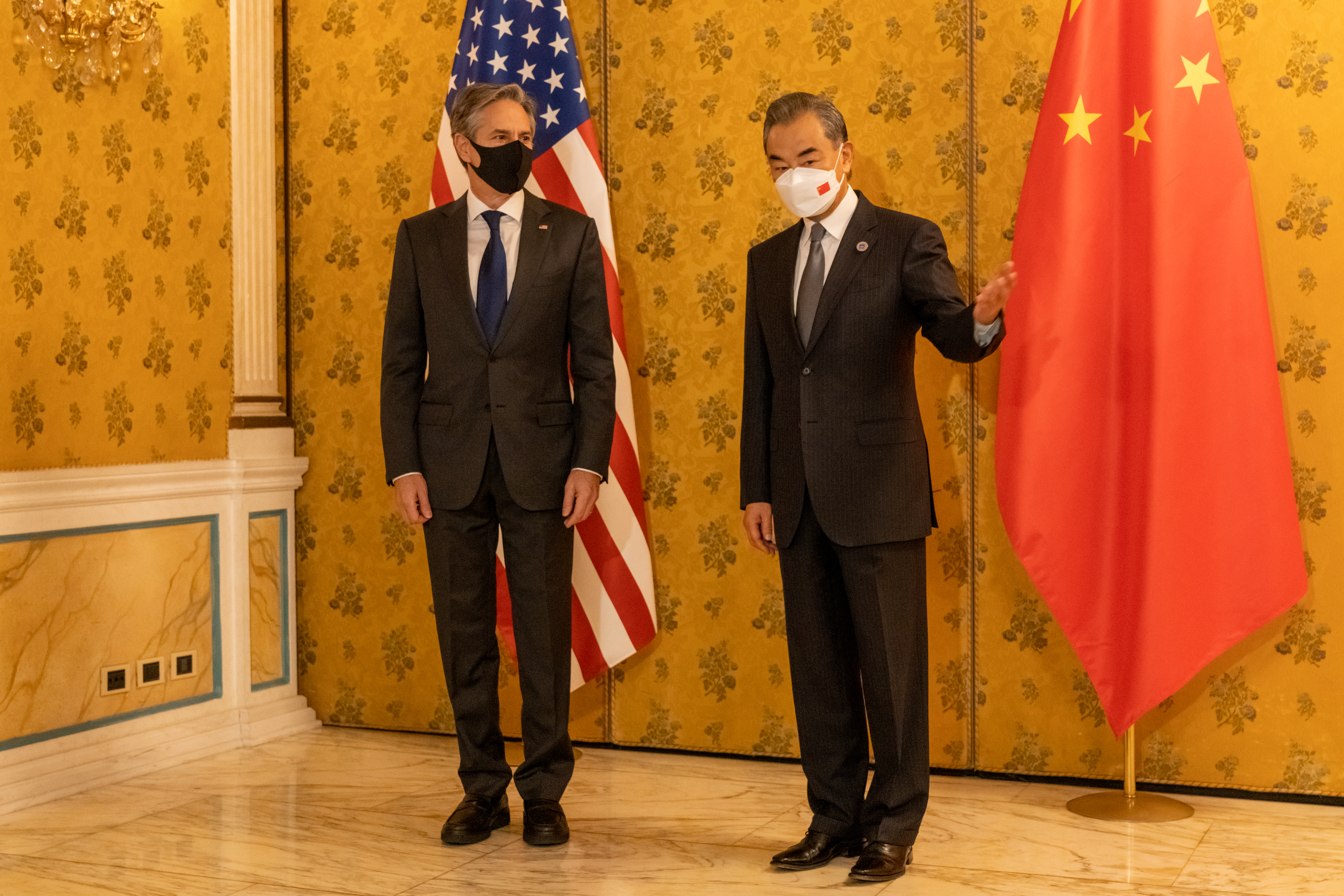
Secretary of State Antony Blinken meets with Chinese official Wang Yi in 2021.

The Washington Post reported that the meeting exemplified China's "wolf warrior" diplomacy during the first meeting with its Chinese counterpart, which was "remarkably undiplomatic", adding "China's diplomats appeared more forceful than they had been in any public meeting during President Trump's term." The Atlantic published an article saying that the Biden team "flushed Beijing's true intentions out into the open for the world to see", quoting a senior administration official's comment that it is "increasingly difficult to argue that we don't know what China wants."

In April 2021, it was reported that the Biden administration was rallying U.S. allies to consider a boycott of the 2022 Winter Olympics in Beijing. The U.S. Department of State denied the report, asserting that "Our position on the 2022 Olympics has not changed. We have not discussed and are not discussing any joint boycott with allies and partners".

At their annual meeting on June 13, 2021, leaders from the Group of Seven (G7) democracies sharply criticized China for a series of abuses. The G7 nations—the United States, United Kingdom, Germany, France, Italy, Canada, and Japan—had been hesitant about acting separately. Pressured by Biden, they unanimously agreed on a sharp criticism, followed the next day by a similar, strong, unanimous attack by NATO members. The criticisms focused on the mistreatment of the Muslim Uyghur minority, the systematic destruction of democracy in Hong Kong, repeated military threats against Taiwan, unfair trade practices, and lack of transparency regarding the origins of COVID-19. China rejected all criticism of what it considered to be strictly internal policy matters. On the other hand, the constellation of critics is essential to the Chinese economy in terms of jobs, investments and purchases of its huge quantity of exports.

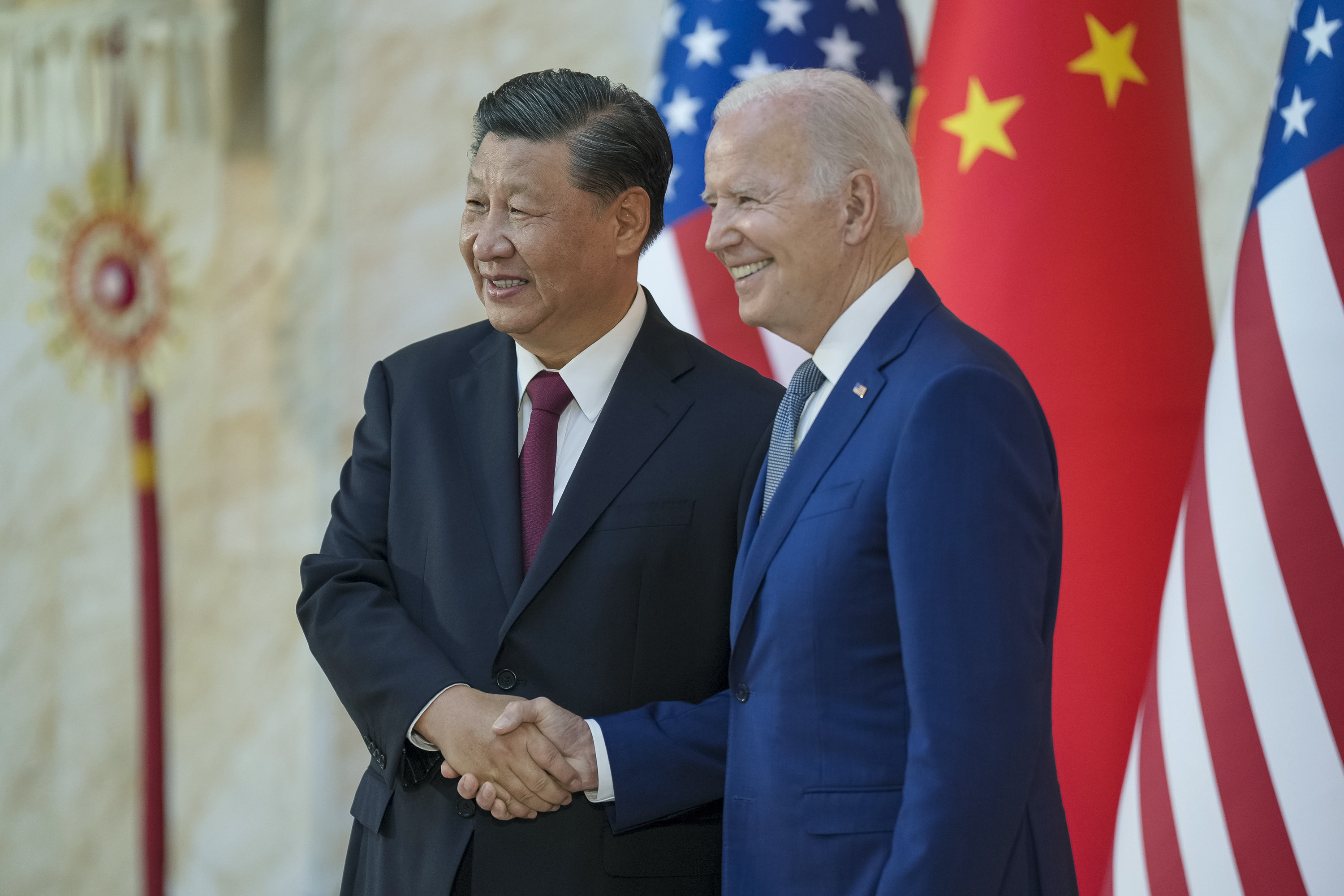
Biden and Chinese leader Xi Jinping at the G20 summit in Bali, November 2022

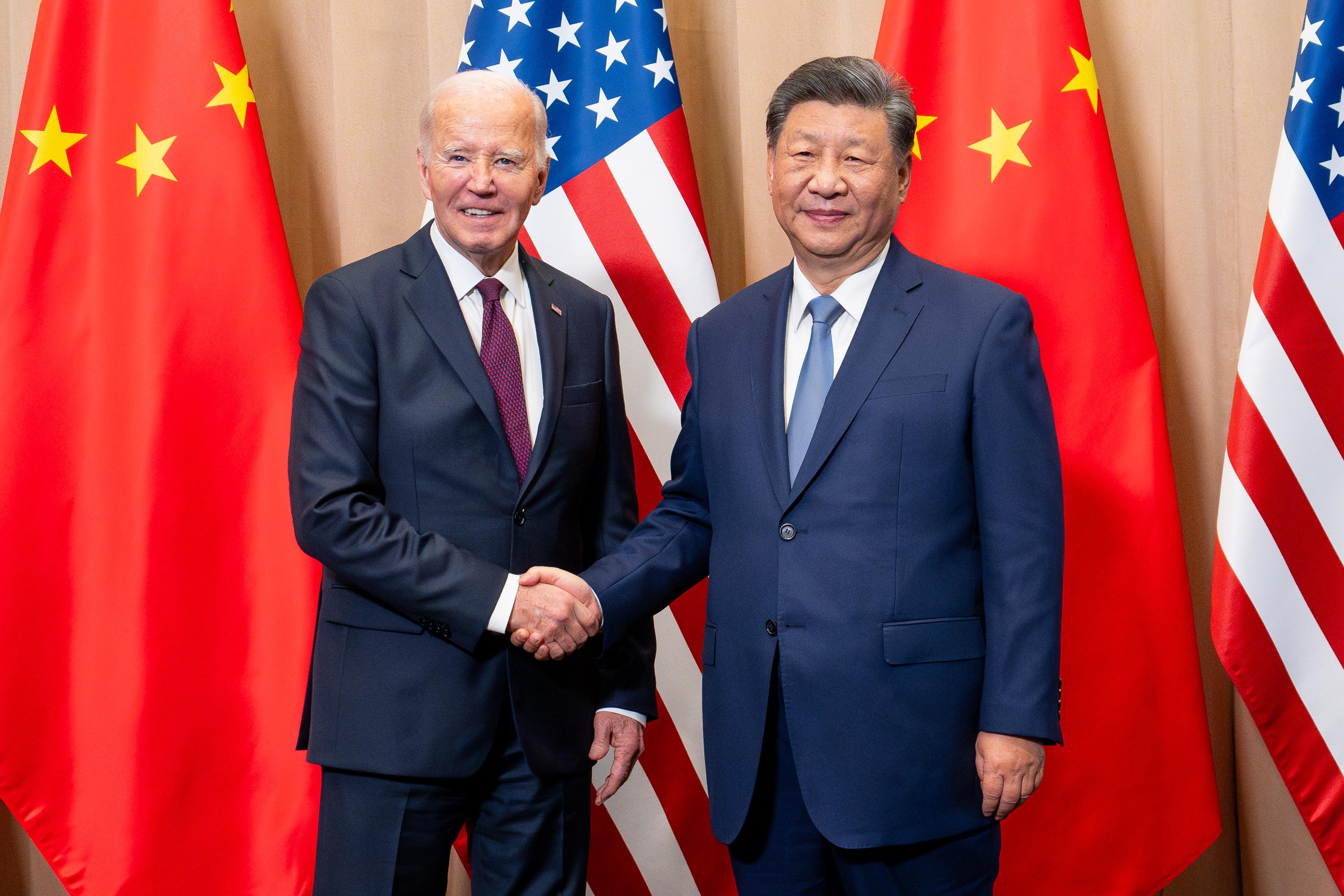
Biden and Chinese leader Xi Jinping in 2024

Biden held his second telephone call with Chinese leader Xi Jinping on September 9, 2021. On September 21, 2021, Biden urged the U.N. General Assembly to consider "relentless diplomacy" amid rising tensions between the U.S. and China. Without mentioning China by name, he said the U.S. is "not seeking a new Cold War or a world divided into rigid blocs." Meng Wanzhou returned to China on September 24.

Biden held his first virtual meeting with Chinese Communist Party leader Xi Jinping on November 15, 2021.

In December 2021, a coalition of Jewish organizations, including the American Jewish Committee and the Rabbinical Assembly, issued an open letter to Biden urging additional action in response to what they describe as an Uyghur genocide.

In late June 2023, Blinken traveled to China and met with Xi; subsequent public statements by both countries were largely positive, with Xi and Blinken emphasizing that both sides have a responsibility to manage relations. Shortly, following Blinken's visit, President Joe Biden's reference to Xi as a “dictator” at an event for his 2024 reelection campaign, drew condemnation from China.

In April 2024, Biden and Xi held a call wherein they stressed the importance of peace and continued cooperation on the 2023 Woodside agreements. Biden warned Xi against interfering in the U.S. elections later this year, and remained committed to free and open navigation of the Taiwan Straits and protection of American interests in high technology.

==== Trade and economic strategies ====
Biden described China as the "most serious competitor" that posed challenges to the "prosperity, security, and democratic values" of the U.S.

In February 2021, Biden ordered the government to undertake a 100-day supply chain review, examining sourcing vulnerabilities for key components (such as semiconductors, rare earth minerals, and certain batteries) used in important goods (such as computers, electric vehicles, pharmaceuticals, personal protective equipment, and military equipment), including vulnerabilities from "strategic competitor nations." Biden stated that the review would assess how to avoid having the U.S. "rely on a foreign country, especially one that doesn't share our interests or our values, in order to protect and provide for our people during a national emergency." The review was part of a broader competition between the U.S. and China for global economic influence.

In May 2021, the administration removed Chinese mobile manufacturer Xiaomi from the Chinese military blacklist, reversing the previous administration's decision.

In June 2021, Biden announced an executive order that would come into effect from August 2, and ban Americans from investing in 59 Chinese firms, including Huawei. Before it was announced, China said it would retaliate against it.

Western commentators on U.S.–China relations, along with United States Trade Representative Katherine Tai, have noted that industrial policy measures signed by Biden in the summer of 2022, such as the CHIPS and Science Act and Inflation Reduction Act, were influenced in part by desire to protect American interests in case of Chinese attacks on Taiwan, and to promote economic competition with China.

The U.S. took steps to restrict TikTok over national-security concerns related to its Chinese ownership. In December 2022, Biden signed the No TikTok on Government Devices Act, barring TikTok on federal devices. In April 2024, he signed the Protecting Americans from Foreign Adversary Controlled Applications Act, which set a deadline for apps owned by foreign adversaries, such as TikTok's parent company ByteDance, to either be sold to a non-adversary owner or be banned in the United States. TikTok's U.S. ban was not enforced; service was restored, and the enforcement deadline was repeatedly extended.

Some geoeconomics experts saw an acceleration of the US–China rivalry as "inevitable" given the tensions manifested openly in the last months of 2022 and early 2023. Nicolas Firzli, director of the EU ASEAN Centre, argued that "Cold War 2 with China [was] part of the Biden Doctrine, and the only remaining point of convergence between Biden and a Republican–dominated Congress [...] January 2023 is the moment when things crystalized irreversibly".

In April 2023, Treasury Secretary Janet Yellen said of U.S.-China economic relations: "The United States will assert ourselves when our vital interests are at stake. But we do not seek to 'decouple' our economy from China's. A full separation of our economies would be disastrous for both countries. It would be destabilizing for the rest of the world. Rather, we know that the health of the Chinese and U.S. economies is closely linked. A growing China that plays by the rules can be beneficial for the United States. For instance, it can mean rising demand for U.S. products and services and more dynamic U.S. industries." In December 2023, Yellen reiterated: "I and other U.S. officials have repeatedly stated that the United States does not seek to decouple from China. This would be damaging to both our economies and would have negative global repercussions."

In May 2024, Biden directed a series of tariff increases on Chinese imports to counteract "unfair trade practices", effective over the next few years. Starting in 2024, tariffs on steel and aluminum rose from 0–7.5% to 25%. Similarly, tariffs on ship-to-shore cranes and lithium-ion EV batteries increased to 25%, and for solar cells, the rate jumped to 50%. The tariff on electric vehicles saw a significant rise to 100%. By 2025, semiconductor tariffs escalated from 25% to 50%. Additional increases will occur in 2026, including tariffs on non-EV lithium-ion batteries and critical minerals like natural graphite and permanent magnets, all set to rise to 25%. Furthermore, medical products such as syringes and needles will see an increase to 50%, and rubber medical gloves will rise to 25% by 2026, alongside other personal protective equipment which increased to 25% in 2024. These adjustments were aimed at protecting American industries from China's competitive economic practices.

==== Security concerns and Taiwan ====
The Biden administration took a tough stance on China, with Blinken and Director of National Intelligence Avril Haines advocating an assertive U.S. approach. The Biden administration rejected China's territorial and maritime claims in the South China Sea that violate international law and pledged to back Southeast Asian nations on territorial disputes. The administration also condemned Chinese incursions into Taiwan's air defense zone. In February 2021, the administration called upon the Chinese government and the World Health Organization to release data about the origin of COVID-19; China had refused to grant WHO investigators access to the raw data on early cases of the virus. The British government backed Biden's call for transparency.

In February 2021, Biden urged the United States Department of Defense to "review" its national security policy concerning China. Biden held his first telephone call with Chinese leader Xi Jinping on February 10, 2021; during the call, Biden raised issues of "Beijing's coercive and unfair economic practices" as well as the government's "crackdown in Hong Kong, human rights abuses in Xinjiang, and increasingly assertive actions in the region, including toward Taiwan"; the conversation also involved the COVID-19 pandemic and "shared challenges of global health security, climate change and preventing weapons proliferation."

Taiwan's peace and stability were mentioned in the leader-level joint statement after Japanese Prime Minister Suga visited President Biden in April 2021.

In October 2021, Biden expressed concern about Chinese hypersonic missiles, days after China tested a nuclear-capable hypersonic missile that circled the globe before speeding towards its target.

The next day, Biden said the U.S. would defend Taiwan if China attacked, though the White House said later there was no change in policy towards the island. In May 2022, the State Department updated its Taiwan fact sheet to reinstate a line saying “we do not support Taiwan independence.” On September 18, 2022, Biden said that U.S. forces would defend Taiwan if China launched an invasion. China condemned the remark, saying it sent the wrong signal to supporters of Taiwanese independence.

In February 2023, U.S. officials tracked a China-operated high-altitude balloon over North American airspace, and Biden ordered it shot down off the coast of South Carolina on February 4 by an F-22 Raptor. China acknowledged ownership but claimed it was a weather device blown off course, while criticizing the U.S. for using force and violating international law. The incident heightened tensions and led Secretary Blinken to postpone a planned visit to Beijing, though Biden said he did not expect long-term damage to relations.

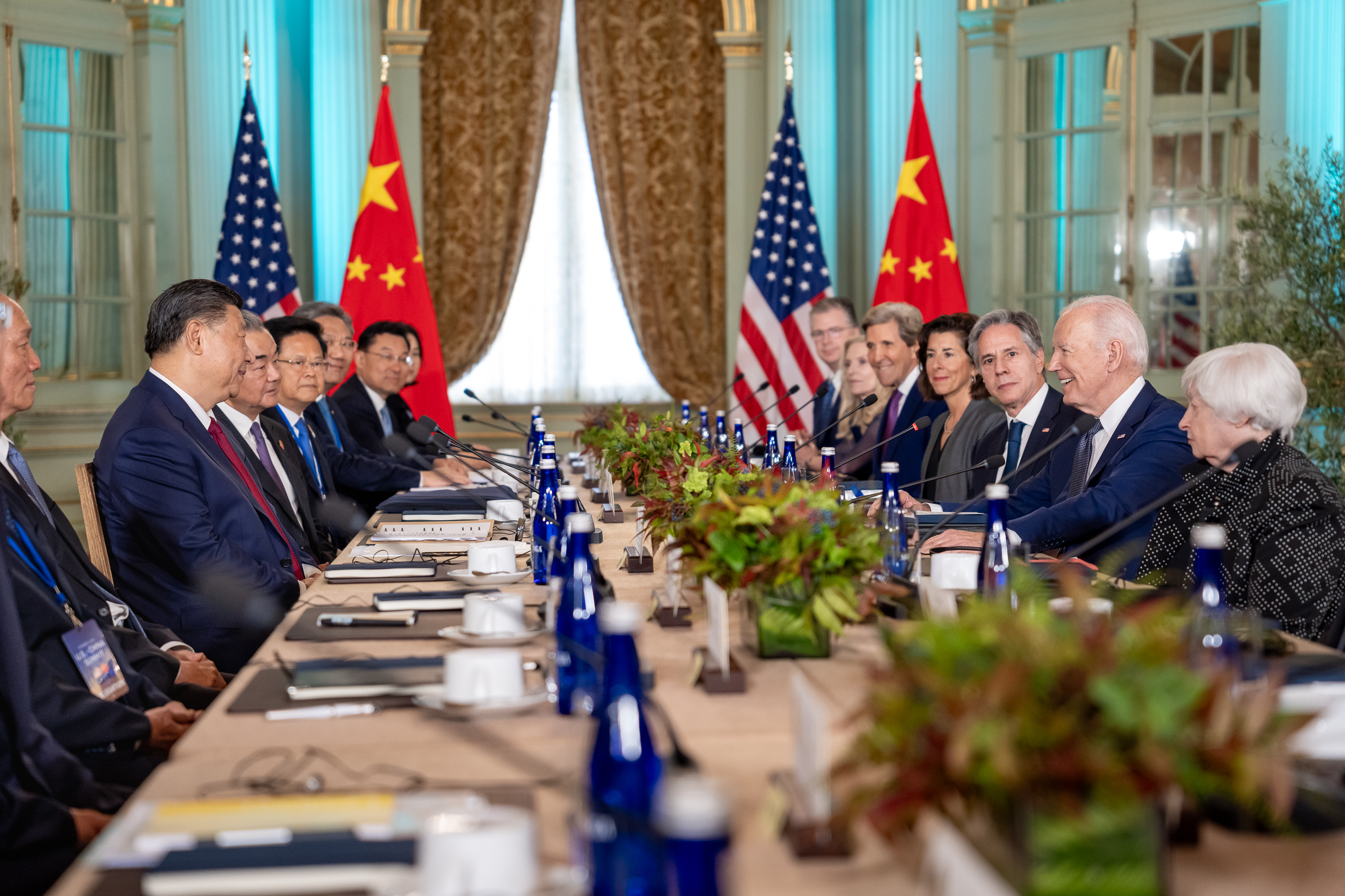
U.S. and Chinese officials meeting in 2023

In November 2023, Biden and Xi met at the Filoli estate in Woodside, California. They agreed to restart cooperation on narcotics crackdowns, a military-to-military hotline, risk and safety management of AI, and increase commercial flights and student exchanges between the two countries, while Biden pledged not to change the U.S. stance of One China, his concerns over improving China–Russia relations, or his shift toward economic nationalism amid a wave of tech export controls.

In February 2024, the U.S. State Department approved $75 million in weapons sales to Taiwan, the 13th such approval under the Biden administration. The announcement was made shortly before the arrival of a bipartisan U.S. House Select Committee on China delegation led by Mike Gallagher in Taiwan.

==== Hong Kong ====
In December 2023, the U.S. State Department again called for Jimmy Lai's release shortly before his trial was set to begin. Spokesperson Matthew Miller said: "We urge Beijing and Hong Kong authorities to respect press freedom in Hong Kong. Actions that stifle press freedom and restrict the free flow of information – as well as Beijing and local authorities’ changes to Hong Kong's electoral system that reduce direct voting and preclude independent and pro-democracy party candidates from participating – have undermined Hong Kong's democratic institutions and harmed Hong Kong's reputation as an international business and financial hub."

In March 2024, the U.S. Secretary of State Antony Blinken stated upon issuing the annual Hong Kong Policy Act report: "This year, I have again certified that Hong Kong does not warrant treatment under U.S. laws in the same manner as the laws were applied to Hong Kong before July 1, 1997. This year’s report catalogs the intensifying repression and ongoing crackdown by PRC and Hong Kong authorities on civil society, media, and dissenting voices, including through the issuance of bounties and arrest warrants for more than a dozen pro-democracy activists living outside Hong Kong. In response, the Department of State is announcing that it is taking steps to impose new visa restrictions on multiple Hong Kong officials responsible for the intensifying crackdown on rights and freedoms, pursuant to Section 212(a)(3)(C) of the Immigration and Nationality Act."

==== Research collaboration and technology security with China ====
In September 2024, the Committee on Strategic Competition between the United States and the Chinese Communist Party published a joint report with the House Committee on Education and the Workforce titled "CCP on the Quad: How American Taxpayers and Universities Fund the CCP's Advanced Military and Technological Research." The report documented how over 8,800 research publications funded by the Department of Defense (DoD) and U.S. intelligence agencies involved collaboration with researchers affiliated with the People's Republic of China (PRC), including institutions linked to China's defense apparatus. The investigation uncovered significant research ties involving artificial intelligence, hypersonic weapons, nuclear physics, and electromagnetic systems—technologies with direct military application. The report drew on findings from LJ Eads, a former Air Force intelligence officer and founder of Data Abyss, and Jeff Stoff, founder of the Center for Research Security & Integrity, who provided critical analysis. Their contributions highlighted hundreds of cases where NASA-funded research violated the Wolf Amendment by enabling bilateral collaboration with PRC institutions, including China's Seven Sons of National Defense and the Chinese Academy of Sciences. Specific cases included research with China's Ocean University—affiliated with the PLA Navy Submarine Academy—on Arctic surveillance-related remote sensing, and a study on sea surface temperatures co-authored with the China Academy of Space Technology. The report called for strengthened research guardrails, enforcement of foreign gift reporting laws, and passage of the DETERRENT Act to safeguard U.S. research from adversarial exploitation.

=== Japan ===
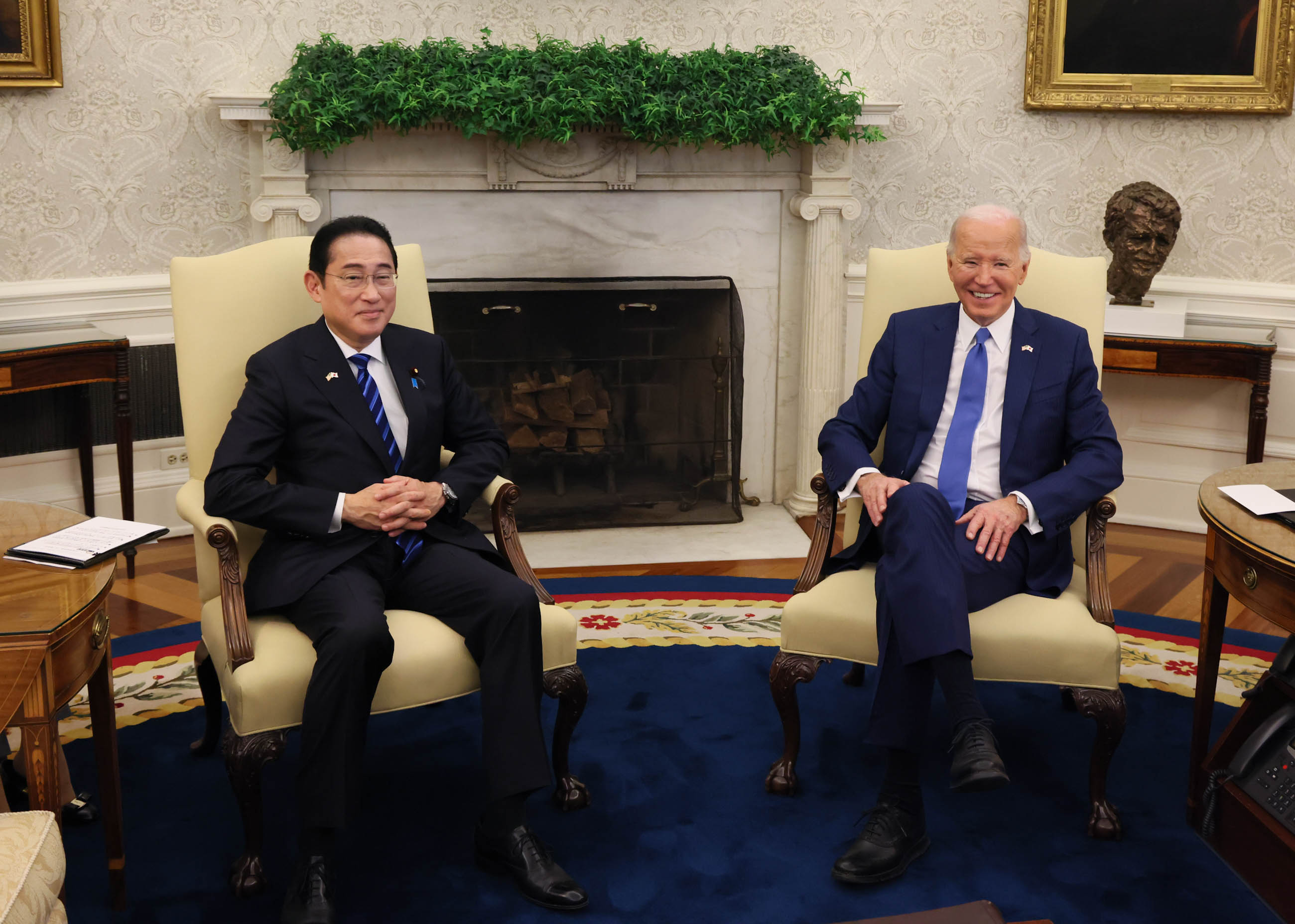
Biden and Japanese prime minister Fumio Kishida in 2024

In January 2021, Biden and Japanese Prime Minister Yoshihide Suga reaffirmed the U.S.'s commitment to the U.S.-Japan security alliance, including the "unwavering" American commitment to defending Japan under the U.S.-Japan Mutual Defense Treaty, including defense of the Senkaku Islands (which are administered by Japan, but claimed by China).

Amid tensions with China and North Korea, The Biden administration strengthened trilateral relations with Japan and South Korea, highlighted by the 2023 Camp David summit with Biden, Japanese prime minister Fumio Kishida, and South Korean President Yoon Suk Yeol. The meeting produced the Camp David Principles relating to joint military exercises, preventing supply chain disruptions, and united criticism of North Korea, Russia, and China.

The first Indo-Pacific Dialogue, building upon the Camp David summit, was held in Washington, D.C. in January 2024. The U.S. said that they discussed with Japan and Korea, collaborating with Southeast Asian and Pacific Island countries to secure their economic ties to the region.

In July 2024, the U.S. began relocating a detachment of approximately 100 logistics support Marines from the III Marine Expeditionary Force from Okinawa to Guam. This move marked the first phase of the relocation process agreed with Japan in 2012 to transfer US Marines to locations outside of Japan. The U.S. military presence on Okinawa has long been a source of controversy, with residents complaining about the noise and misconduct from the troops.

=== North Korea ===
An early Biden administration effort to open a line of communication with North Korea was rebuffed. Following the launch of two missiles by North Korea in March 2021, the Biden administration questioned if they should impose sanctions or return to the summit-style diplomacy of the Trump administration.

=== South Korea ===
Biden and South Korean president Yoon Suk Yeol in 2023

In February 2021, Biden and South Korean President Moon Jae-in agreed to enhance regional cooperation between Japan, the U.S., and South Korea on key issues, including issues on North Korea and China, and on the importance of improving strained Japan–South Korea relations. In March 2021, the U.S. and South Korea reached a military cost-sharing agreement, with South Korea increasing its annual payments to the U.S. by $1 billion (or about 13%). The U.S.-South Korea agreement resolved a deadlock inherited from the Trump administration. The U.S. also announced U.S.-South Korean joint military exercises (which Trump had scaled back and questioned the need for). The Biden administration affirmed the U.S.'s "unshakable" security commitment to South Korea under the Mutual Defense Treaty, to the readiness of U.S. forces in Korea, and to "reinvigorating and modernizing our democratic alliances around the world."

After Biden signed the Inflation Reduction Act, South Korean public finance and trade officials complained that its green industrial policy package, which encourages U.S. manufacturing of renewable energy and electric vehicles, threatens the U.S.–South Korean partnership on climate action and countering China's influence, sparking fears of a trade war.

=== Indonesia ===
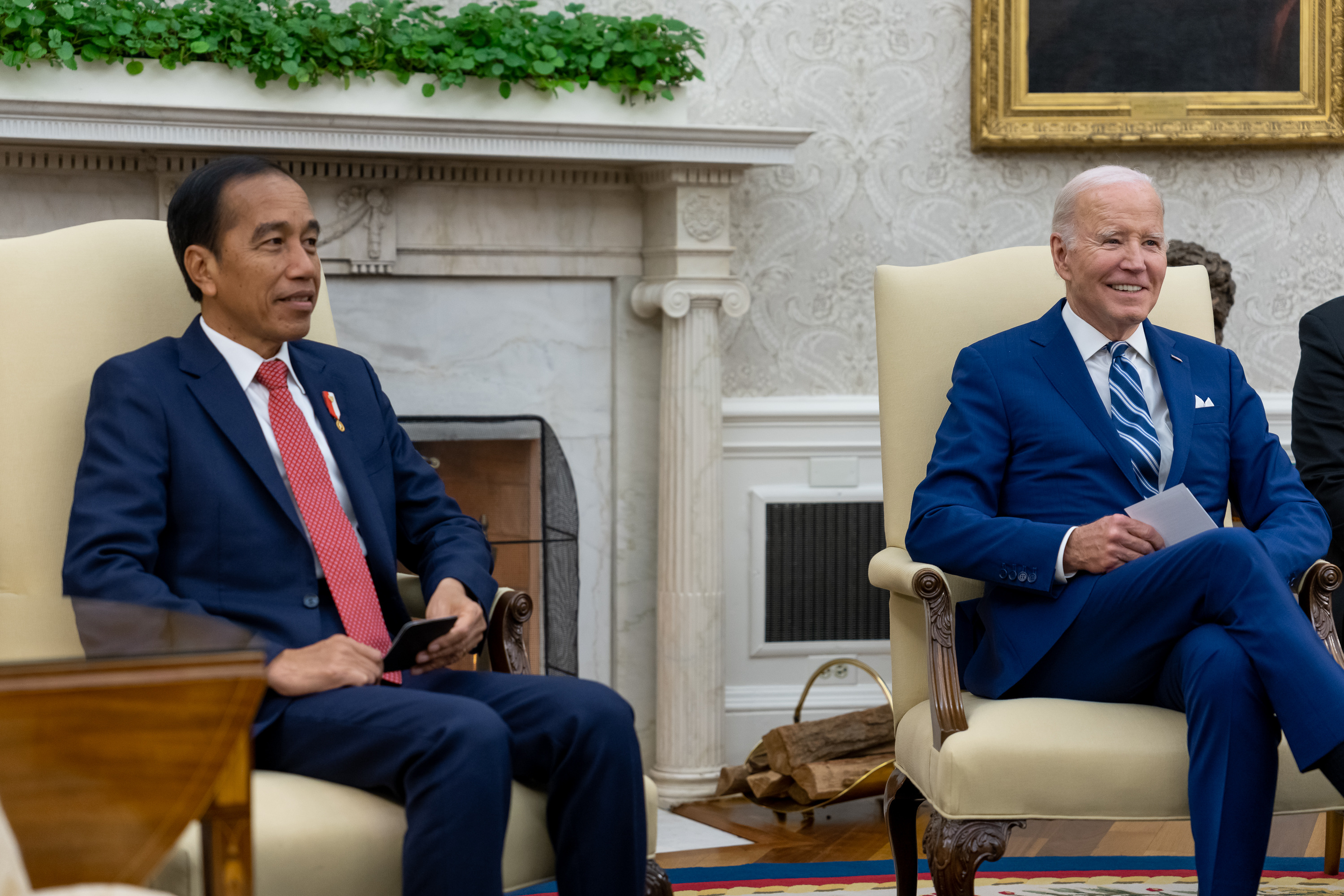
Biden and Indonesian president Joko Widodo in 2023.

On November 13, 2023, during a meeting between Biden and Indonesian president Joko Widodo, the two countries announced a new comprehensive strategic partnership. However, Indonesia continues to maintain a policy of neutrality between the United States and China.

=== Myanmar ===
Biden condemned the 2021 coup d'état in Myanmar and called upon Myanmar's military to release the officials they detained, such as State Counsellor Aung San Suu Kyi. Biden stated that the U.S. "opposes any attempt to alter the outcome of recent elections or impede Myanmar's democratic transition." Biden imposed new U.S. sanctions against the coup plotters (some of whom were already under sanctions for atrocities against the Rohingya minority), including freezing $1 billion in assets.

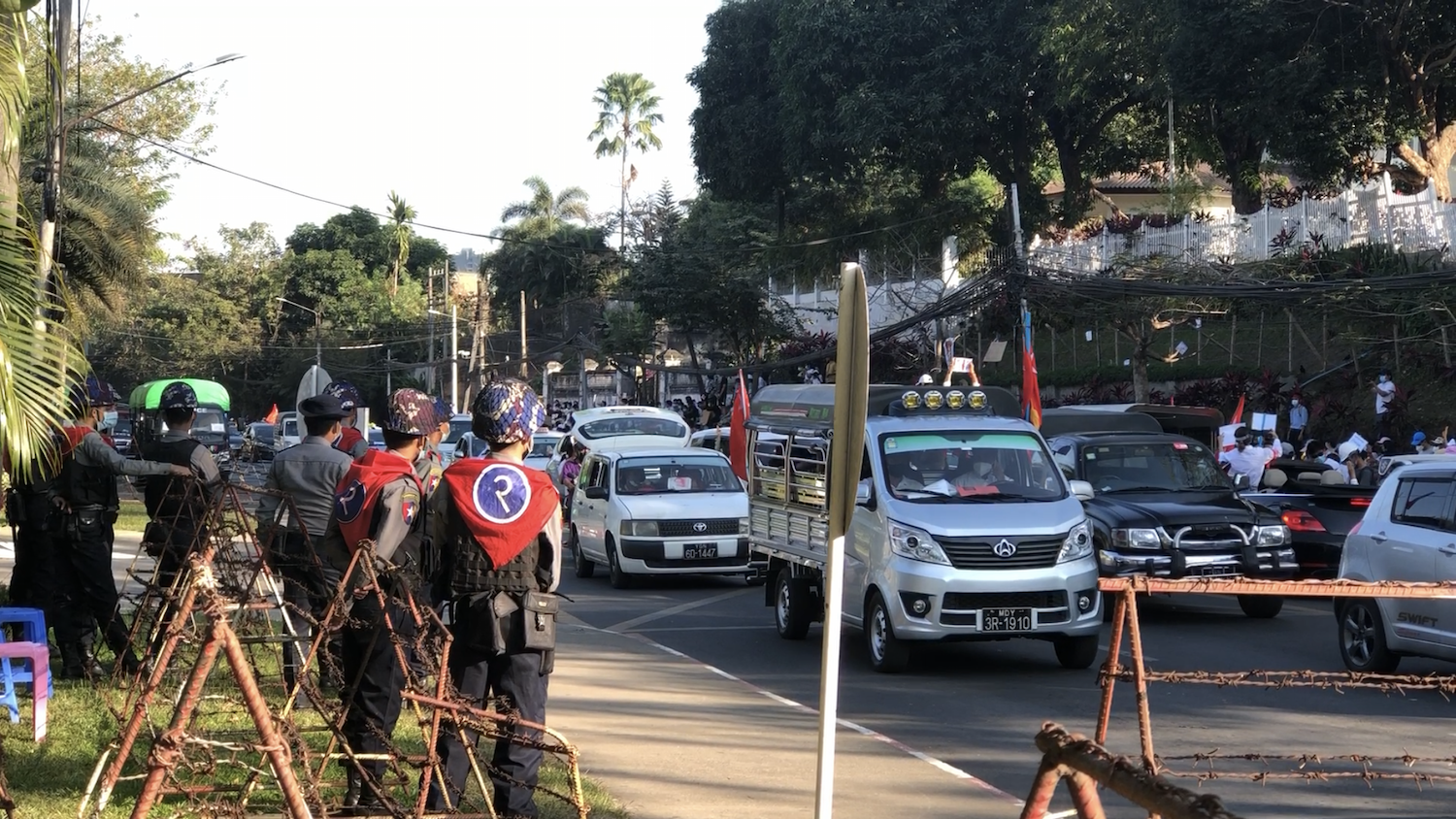
Police in front of U.S. Embassy in Myanmar during the 2021 protests

In February 2021, State Counsellor Aung San Suu Kyi was overthrown in a military coup led by Min Aung Hlaing. The United States condemned the coup and threatened to impose sanctions. They later followed through on the threat on February 10, when Biden announced sanctions on Myanmar military leaders and their business associates.

In August 2021, as the protests escalated into greater conflict, two Myanmar citizens in the United States were arrested over an alleged plot to hire hitmen to assassinate Kyaw Moe Tun, Myanmar's representative to the United Nations in New York. Kyaw Moe Tun had defied the military coup publicly at the UN earlier in 2021, continuing to represent the ousted government.

In March 2022, the U.S. formally recognized the Rohingya genocide in a decision announced by Antony Blinken.

In July 2022, the State Administration Council junta of Myanmar executed four political prisoners, marking the first time the death penalty had been carried out in Myanmar since the late 1980s. The G7 nations, including the U.S., issued a joint statement condemning the executions for its disregard of human rights and the rule of law. The State Department further pressed China to influence the situation stating that "it cannot be business as usual with the junta."

In November 2022, the U.S. and the EU announced further sanctions on individuals and companies connected with atrocities in Myanmar's war targeting military junta officials, arms dealers, and their associated companies. One arms company targeted was Sky Aviator Company and its owner Kyaw Min Oo, who the State department assessed as a key supplier of military aircraft parts to the junta's lethal air strikes against civilians and political opposition.

In December 2022, The BURMA Act was passed by Congress, authorizing sanctions on individuals involved in the coup d'état, providing support to civil society and humanitarian assistance, as well as creating a position within the State Department dedicated to democracy in Burma.

In October 2023, at the State Administration Council meeting, General Min Aung Hlaing blamed the US for its containment policy against China and for provoking unrest in Myanmar. Later that month, U.S. Department of the Treasury's Office of Foreign Assets Control (OFAC) imposed sanctions on Myanmar's state-owned Myanma Oil and Gas Enterprise (MOGE), responsible for oil and gas extraction, production, and distribution, and generating significant revenue for the military regime. The sanction also targeted the regime's five top officials: Charlie Than, Kan Zaw, Swe Swe Aung, Zaw Min, and General Maung Maung Aye.

=== Philippines ===
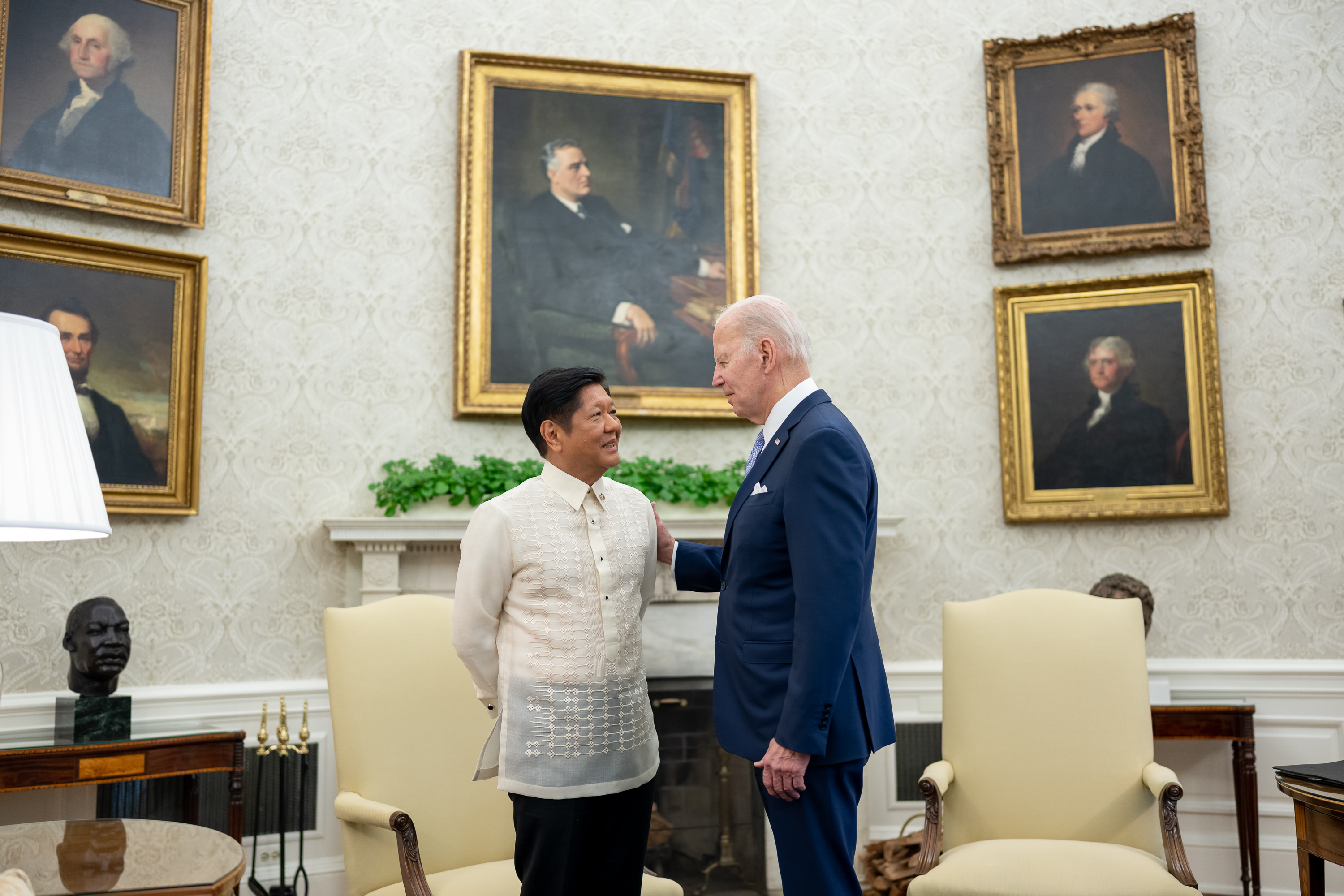
Biden and Filipino president Bongbong Marcos in 2023

In 2021, the Biden administration participated in a U.S. military-run propaganda campaign to spread disinformation about the Sinovac Chinese COVID-19 vaccine, which had begun in 2020 during the Trump administration. The campaign was described as "payback" for COVID-19 disinformation by China directed against the U.S. Primarily targeting people in the Philippines, the campaign used fake social media accounts to spread disinformation, including that the Sinovac vaccine contained pork-derived ingredients and was therefore haram under Islamic law.

On the sidelines of the September 2022 UN General Assembly meeting, Filipino President Bongbong Marcos met with Biden and gave assurances that the Philippines would remain "partner, ally, friend" to the U.S. Biden acknowledged that the U.S.-Philippine relationship faced "rocky times", but assured Marcos that the U.S. wishes to keep strengthening it. The two leaders discussed increased cooperation on renewable energy, the South China Sea, relations with Taiwan, the Russia-Ukraine war, energy and food prices, and human rights.

In response to increased military threats from China, the Biden administration's efforts in early 2023, led by Defense Secretary Lloyd Austin, resulted in Marcos' administration opening up access to four Philippine military bases (on top of the current five) for the U.S. military, under the Enhanced Defense Cooperation Agreement, and considering negotiating with the U.S. and key ally Japan on a common defense pact.

== Middle East and North Africa (MENA) ==
Biden had been a proponent of his "counterterrorism plus" strategy in the Middle East. Biden told the Council on Foreign Relations that his foreign policy would destroy al-Qaeda and Islamic State, ensuring their remnants would not reconstitute themselves.

On the day Biden took office, the new administration adopted tighter controls on drone strikes and special forces raids in places where there are few U.S. troops, including Libya and Yemen. The policy halted the Trump-era policy that gave U.S. military officials more discretion to launch counterterrorism attacks without White House oversight. The temporary measure was put in place while the Biden administration completed an interagency review into the drone policy. The review focused on whether to restore a 2016 order issued by Obama (revoked in 2019 by Trump) that would require the government to issue an annual report disclosing estimates of the numbers of suspected terrorists and civilian casualties, and whether to return to the Obama-era centralized oversight system (in which proposed drone strikes could be approved only if the suspect presented a "continuing and imminent threat" to Americans, and were subject to high-level intelligence vetting in an effort to minimize civilian casualties and blowback) or to keep elements of the Trump-era approach (which was looser and delegated more power to the military and CIA to determine whether to carry out a strike).

=== Caucasus ===
In April 2021, Biden made a statement recognizing the Armenian genocide as a genocide after he indicated support for Congress recognizing it as well. The move caused contention with the Turkish Government, which refused to recognize the World War I-era systematic slaughter of Armenians by the Ottoman Empire as genocide and seeks to persuade other nations to do the same.

As designate, Secretary of State Blinken reaffirmed his support for keeping NATO's door open for Georgia.

In November 2021, the U.S. State Department praised the independent medical team that criticized the prison hospital conditions that Mikheil Saakashvili was placed in, and urged the Georgian government to treat Saakashvili "fairly and with dignity" and guarantee his right to a fair trial.

In June 2024, U.S. and Armenian diplomats met in Yerevan and pledged to increase bilateral ties. "The sides positively assessed cooperation to support Armenia's ongoing reforms and democratic progress and noted Armenia's aspirations for closer cooperation with Euro-Atlantic institutions and the West," a joint statement said. The two sides announced that they would deepen ties in the coming year, which will be formalized by signing a deal to upgrade the status of bilateral dialogue to a "Strategic Partnership Commission". This comes as trade turnover between Washington and Yerevan had quadrupled since 2020. Military officials also vowed to establish formal bilateral defense consultations to "regularize planning of defense cooperation objectives."

=== Iran ===
Relations between Iran and the United States during Joe Biden's term as the president of the United States (2021–2025) were shaped by efforts to revive the 2015 nuclear agreement alongside ongoing regional tensions, sanctions, cyberattacks, and proxy conflicts. Early in Biden's presidency, U.S. officials expressed interest in returning to the Joint Comprehensive Plan of Action (JCPOA), but negotiations in Vienna eventually stalled. Iran increased uranium enrichment and imposed retaliatory sanctions, while the U.S. imposed new sanctions over missile programs, oil exports, and human rights abuses.

Tensions persisted throughout this era, marked by recurring proxy attacks on U.S. bases, which intensified following the outbreak of the Gaza war in late 2023, and by subsequent American retaliatory strikes. The period also saw disputes over the assassination of Qasem Soleimani, and military escalations across the Gulf region. In 2023, a breakthrough occurred with a U.S.–Iran prisoner swap and the release of frozen Iranian funds, though indirect diplomacy remained fragile. Iran was later accused of interfering in the 2024 U.S. presidential election through cyber operations and AI disinformation. Alleged assassination plots targeting Donald Trump and dissidents on U.S. soil further strained relations. By late 2024, relations remained adversarial, marked by unresolved security disputes and growing mistrust.

=== Israel and Palestine conflict ===
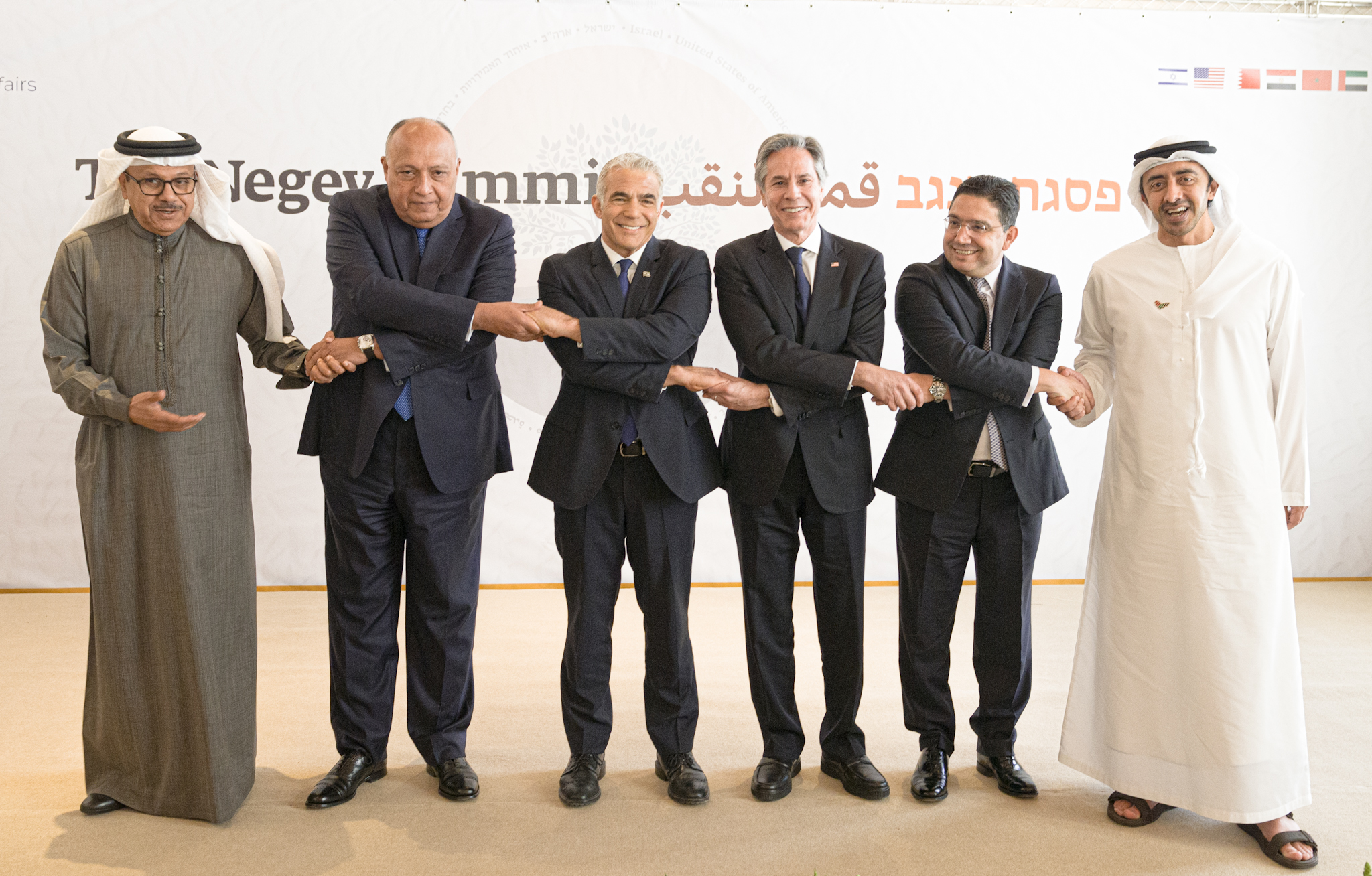
Secretary of state Antony Blinken participates in the Negev Summit, March 2022

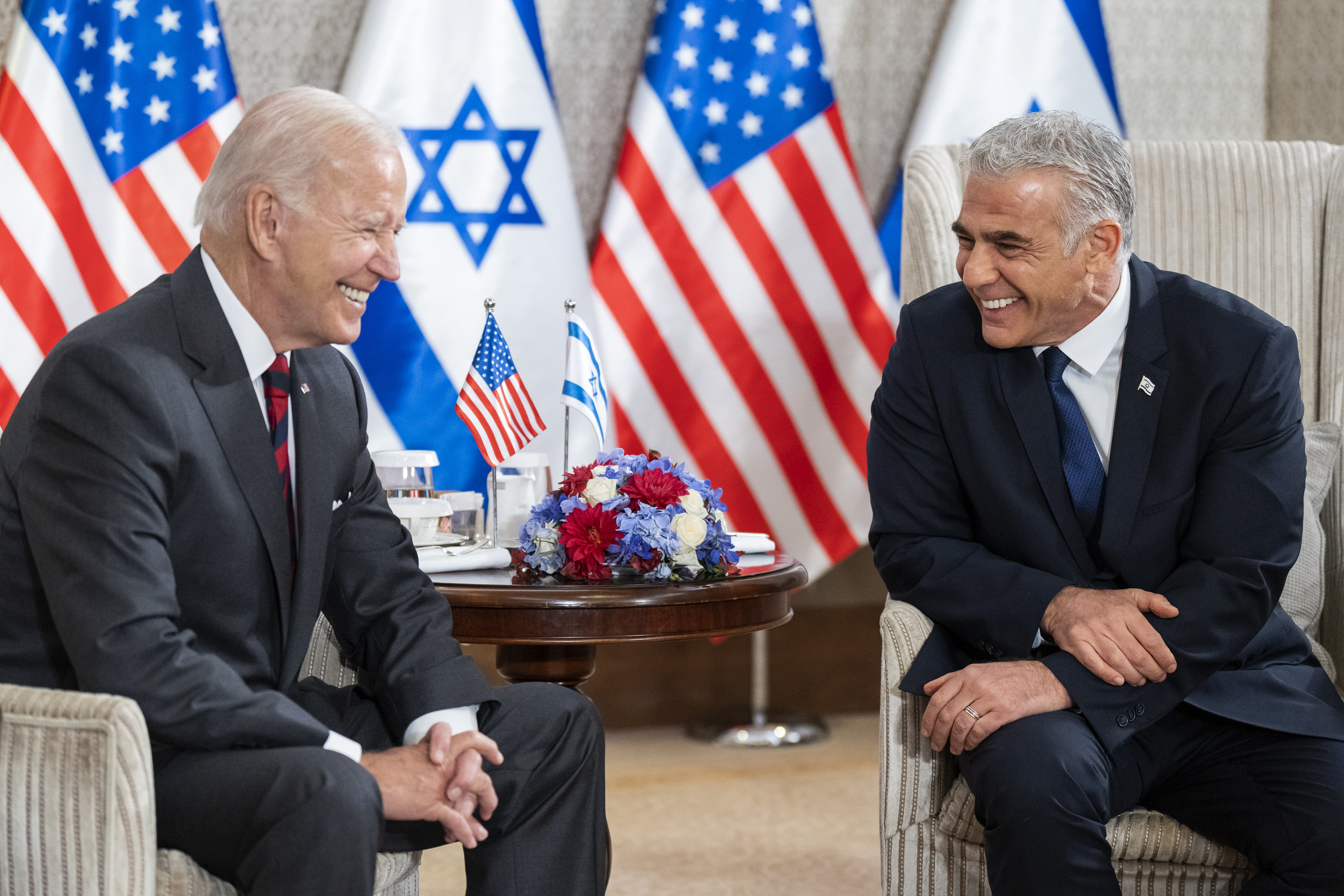
Biden and Israeli Prime Minister Yair Lapid in Jerusalem, July 2022

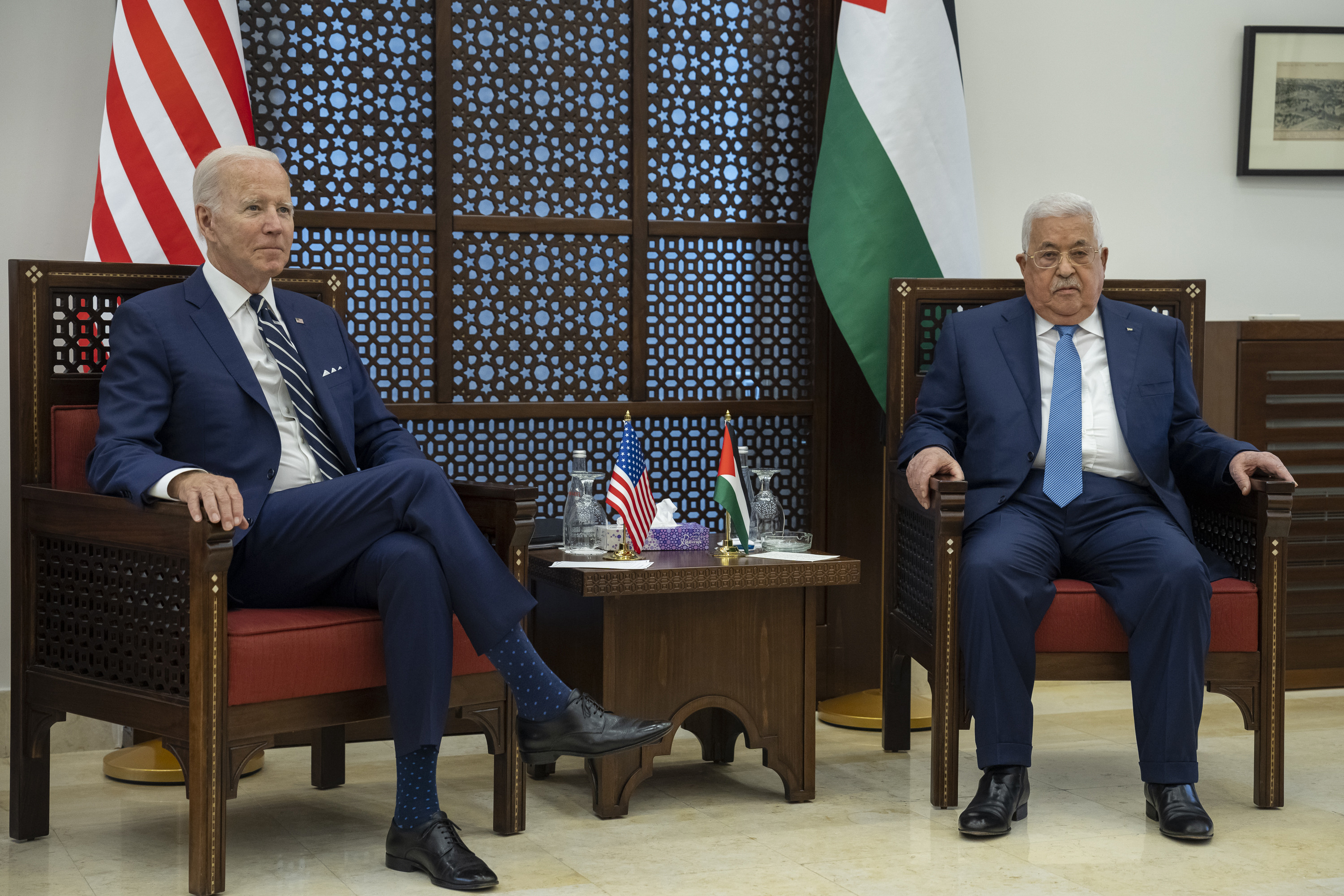
Biden and President of the Palestinian Authority Mahmoud Abbas in Bethlehem, July 2022

President Biden had been a firm supporter of Israel-United States relations, describing himself as a Zionist and stating that U.S. aid to Israel is an investment. U.S. ambassador to the UN, Linda Thomas-Greenfield, vowed to "stand against the unfair singling out of Israel for Boycott, Divestment, and Sanctions," saying that the movement "verges on antisemitism."

During his Senate confirmation hearing, Secretary of State Antony Blinken said that the Biden administration would continue to recognize Jerusalem as the capital of Israel and to keep the U.S. embassy in Jerusalem which had been relocated from its previous site in Tel Aviv by the Trump Administration per the 1995 Jerusalem Embassy Act, passed by a bipartisan supermajority. Biden called Trump's move, done without conditions, "short-sighted and frivolous" but said during his campaign that he would keep the embassy in Jerusalem and not move it back to Tel Aviv. In February 2021, the U.S. Senate adopted an amendment to a budget resolution that affirmed the U.S. intent to keep the embassy in Jerusalem.

Consistent with Biden's statements during the campaign, upon taking office, the Biden administration returned the U.S. to a "more traditional and evenhanded approach to the Israeli-Palestinian conflict." Biden's acting U.S. ambassador to the UN reaffirmed that the U.S. supported a negotiated two-state solution "in which Israel lives in peace and security, alongside a viable Palestinian state" and called upon the parties to refrain from taking steps that could inhibit a two-state solution, such as Israel annexing or expanding settlements in the West Bank, or the Palestinians inciting violence. The administration restored U.S. diplomatic relations with the Palestinian Authority and resumed U.S. aid to the Palestinians, two years after Trump had effectively ended U.S. engagement with the Palestinians.

Biden's first call as president with a Middle Eastern leader was with Israeli Prime Minister Benjamin Netanyahu in mid-February 2021; on the call, Biden reaffirmed U.S. support for Israeli security, for the recent normalization of relations between Israel and a handful of Arab and Muslim nations as part of the Trump administration agreement called the Abraham Accords, and for the Israeli–Palestinian peace process, and the two leaders discussed cooperation against threats from Iran. On April 7, 2021, the Biden administration announced its intention to restore hundreds of millions of dollars in U.S. aid to the Palestinians.

Blinken attended the Negev Summit in March 2022, hosted by Foreign Minister Yair Lapid of Israel and counterparts from Morocco, UAE, Bahrain, and Egypt, all countries signatories to peace agreements with Israel. In July 2022, it was announced by the White House that Biden would travel to the Middle East and meet with the leaders of Israel, the Palestinian Authority, and Saudi Arabia.

Biden delivers remarks on Hamas terrorist attacks in Israel

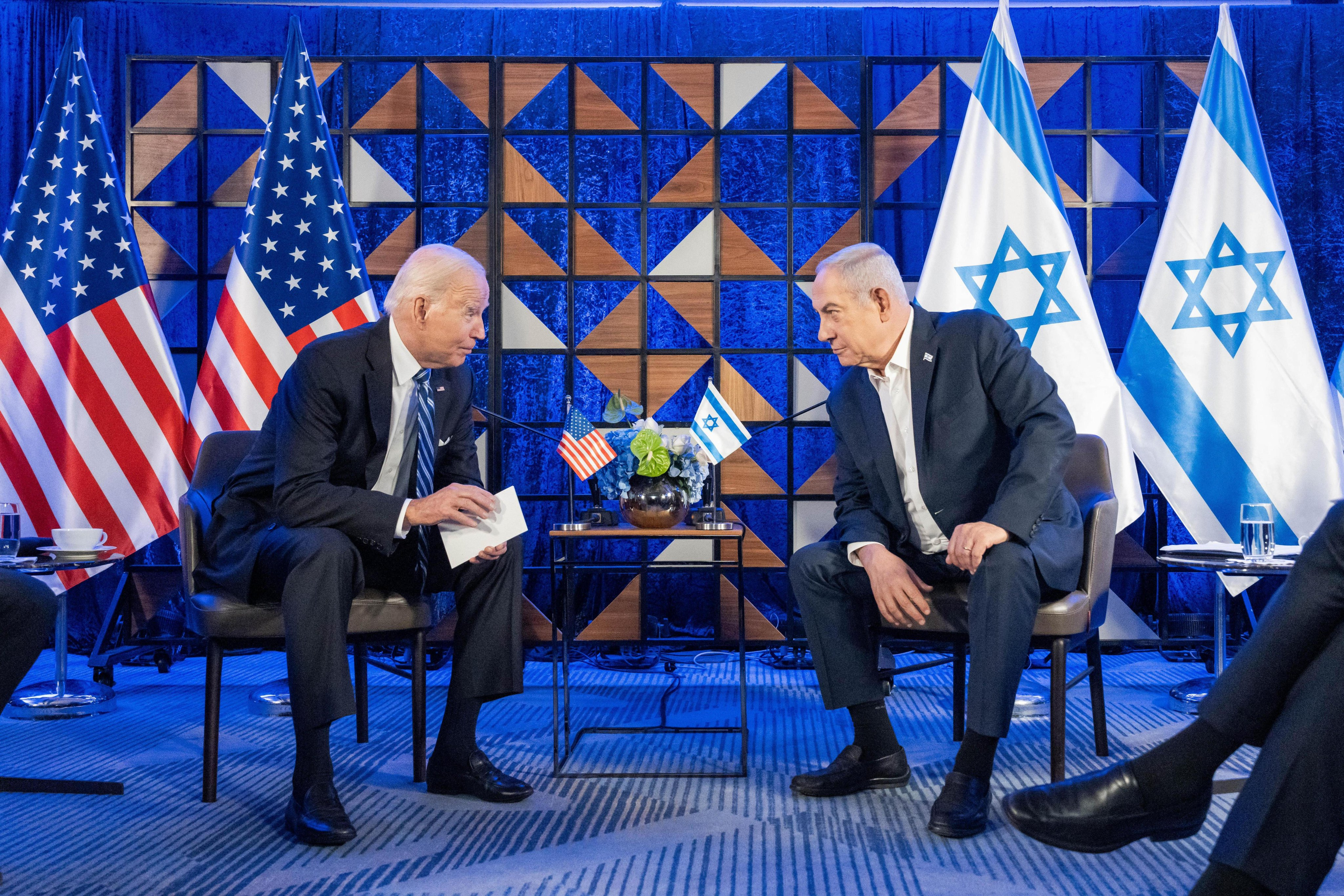
Biden and Israeli Prime Minister Benjamin Netanyahu in Tel Aviv, October 2023

After Hamas launched a surprise terror attack on Israel on October 7, 2023, Biden issued a statement condemning the attacks and saying he was ready to offer "all appropriate means of support to the Government and people of Israel". Biden called on Congress to pass $14.3 billion in emergency military aid to Israel; Israel already received $3.8 billion a year in military aid as part of the Memorandum of Understanding negotiated under the Obama Administration. On October 18, Biden arrived in Israel and was received at Ben-Gurion airport by Israeli President Isaac Herzog and Prime Minister Benjamin Netanyahu On October 23, he rejected calls for a ceasefire in the Gaza war, stating "We should have those hostages released and then we can talk". Biden stated he had "no confidence" in the death totals reported by the Gaza Health Ministry. The Biden Administration bypassed Congress twice in December 2023 to rush weapons to Israel worth a total of about $250 million.

In February 2024, following an announcement by the Israeli government regarding an increase in Israeli settlements within the West Bank, the Biden administration announced it had reversed a 2019 Trump-era decision that had declined to recognize Israeli settlements as a violation of international law. Secretary of State Antony Blinken reiterated this position stating that the settlements were "inconsistent with international law" and that "[Settlement expansion] only weakens, it doesn’t strengthen, Israel’s security,".

The Biden administration vetoed 3 UN ceasefires for Gaza on October 18, December 8, and February 20, 2024.

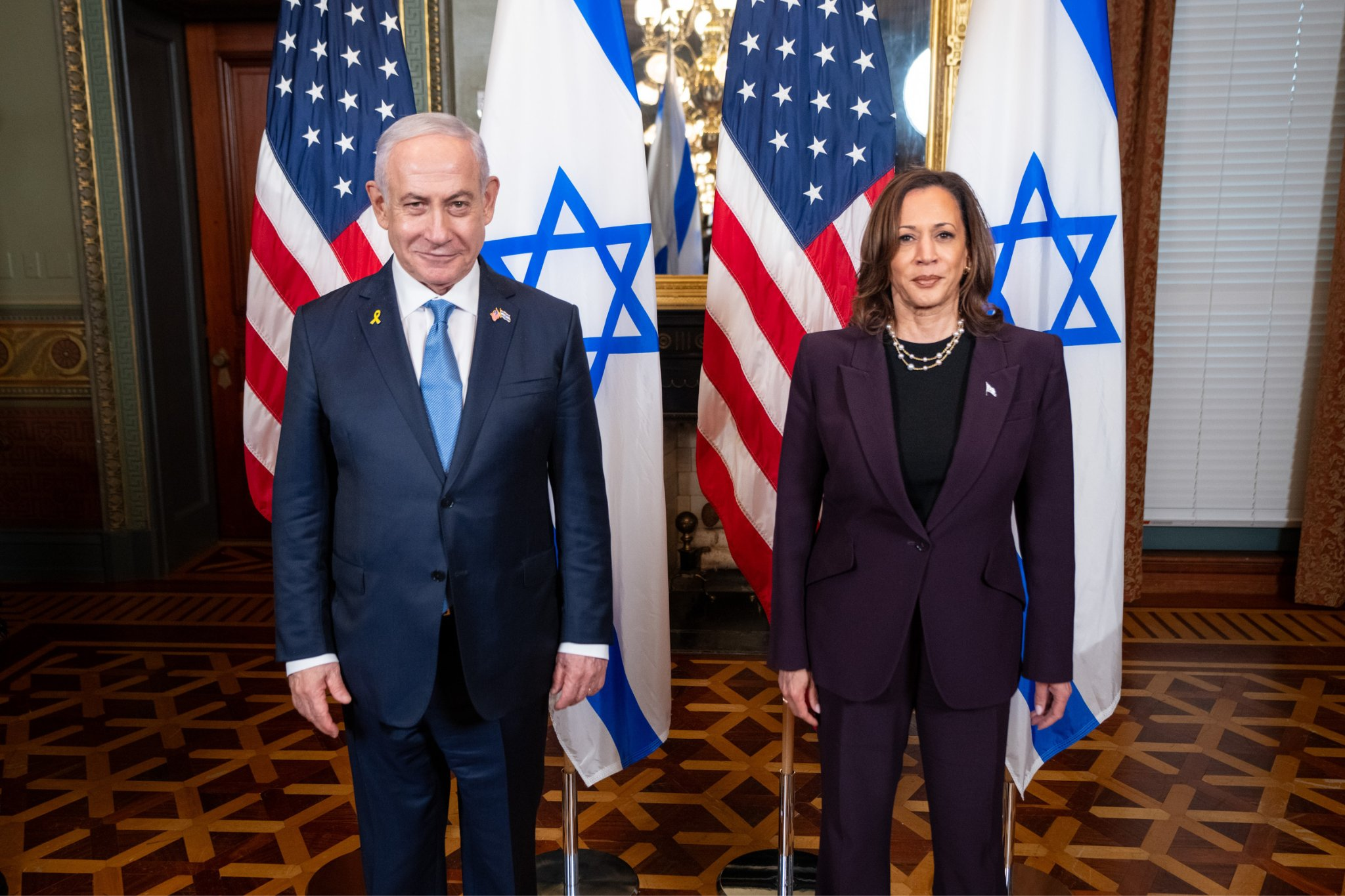
Vice President Harris and Israeli Prime Minister Benjamin Netanyahu, July 2024

In April 2024, the Biden administration vetoed a UN resolution for Palestinian statehood. Biden signed a bill to send $26 billion to Israel, plus $1 billion in aid for Gaza, on April 24.

On May 31 3034, Biden announced his support for an Israeli ceasefire proposal, saying that Hamas was "no longer capable" of another large-scale attack. The proposal, which would establish a permanent ceasefire, release all hostages, and reconstruct the Gaza Strip, was supported by Hamas officials after mediation by Egypt and Qatar, where the Hamas leadership resides. The Netanyahu administration responded that Israel's goals regarding "the destruction of Hamas military and governing capabilities" had not changed and that conditions would need to be met before it would agree to a ceasefire. In the first year of the war, it was estimated that the Biden administration had sent Israel at least $17.9 billion in military aid, a record. In about the same period, it sent Palestinians $1.2 billion in humanitarian aid. In the last week of Biden's presidency, Qatari officials announced that Hamas had accepted the ceasefire deal, with 33 hostages to be released pending Israeli approval. Biden hailed the deal, saying "it is long past time for the fighting to end and the work of building peace and security to begin" in a press release the same day.

In July 2024, the Biden administration resumed shipments of the 500-pound bombs to Israel, which were halted in May over concerns about the humanitarian impact of Israel's use of them in killing Palestinians in Gaza.

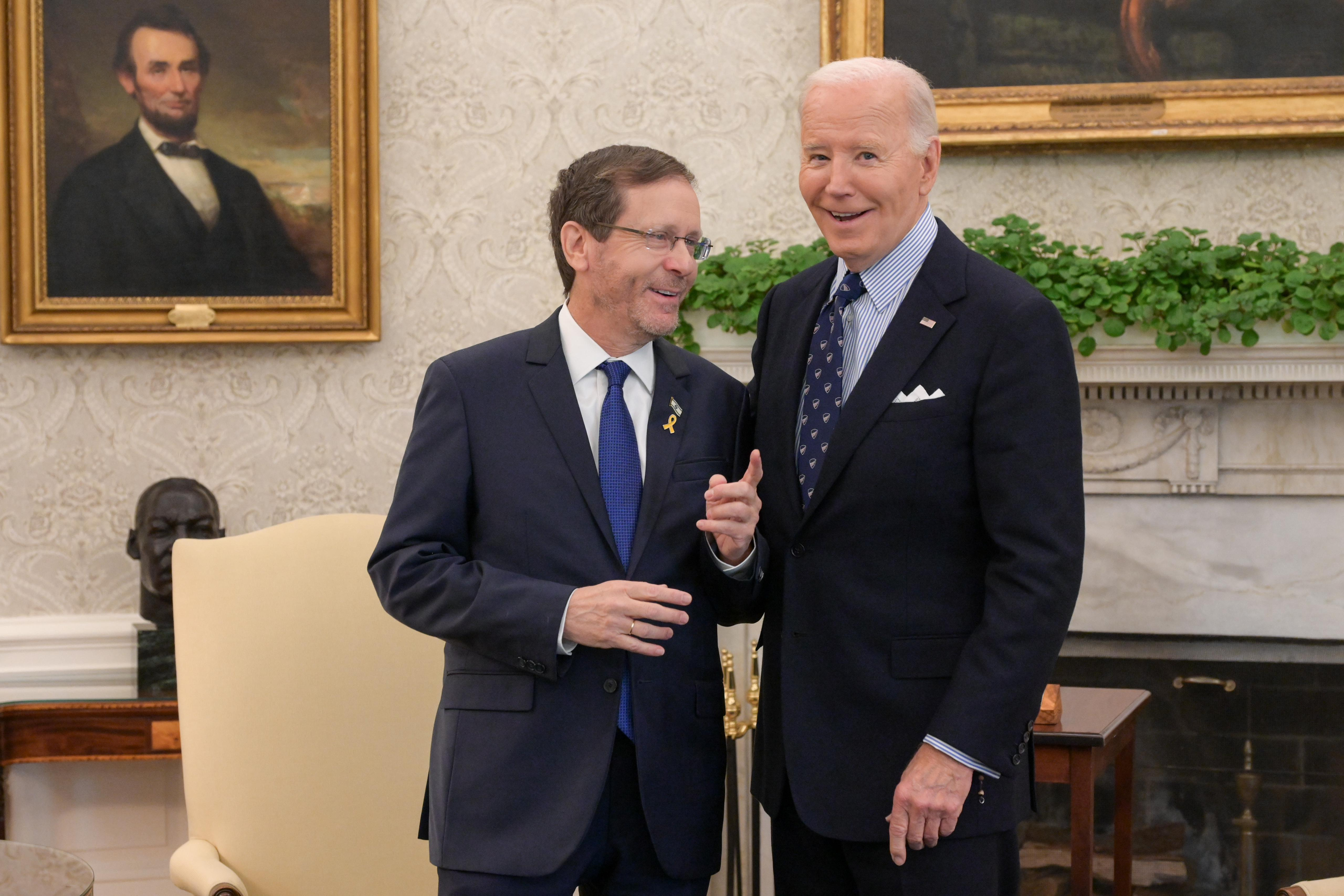
Biden and Israeli President Isaac Herzog, November 2024

In September 2024, thousands of handheld pagers used by Hezbollah simultaneously exploded across Lebanon and Syria. The attack came just a day after the Biden administration's special envoy Amos Hochstein visited Israel and warned Prime Minister Benjamin Netanyahu against provoking a major escalation in Lebanon. Later that month, U.S. Representative Rashida Tlaib called on Antony Blinken to resign, citing the ProPublica story alleging he had rejected internal government findings about Israel blocking aid to Gaza, which has been disputed. The internal findings, ProPublica reported, could have implications for U.S. military aid to Israel because of U.S. laws, which require an end to weapons shipments to countries that block U.S.-backed humanitarian aid.

=== Jordan ===
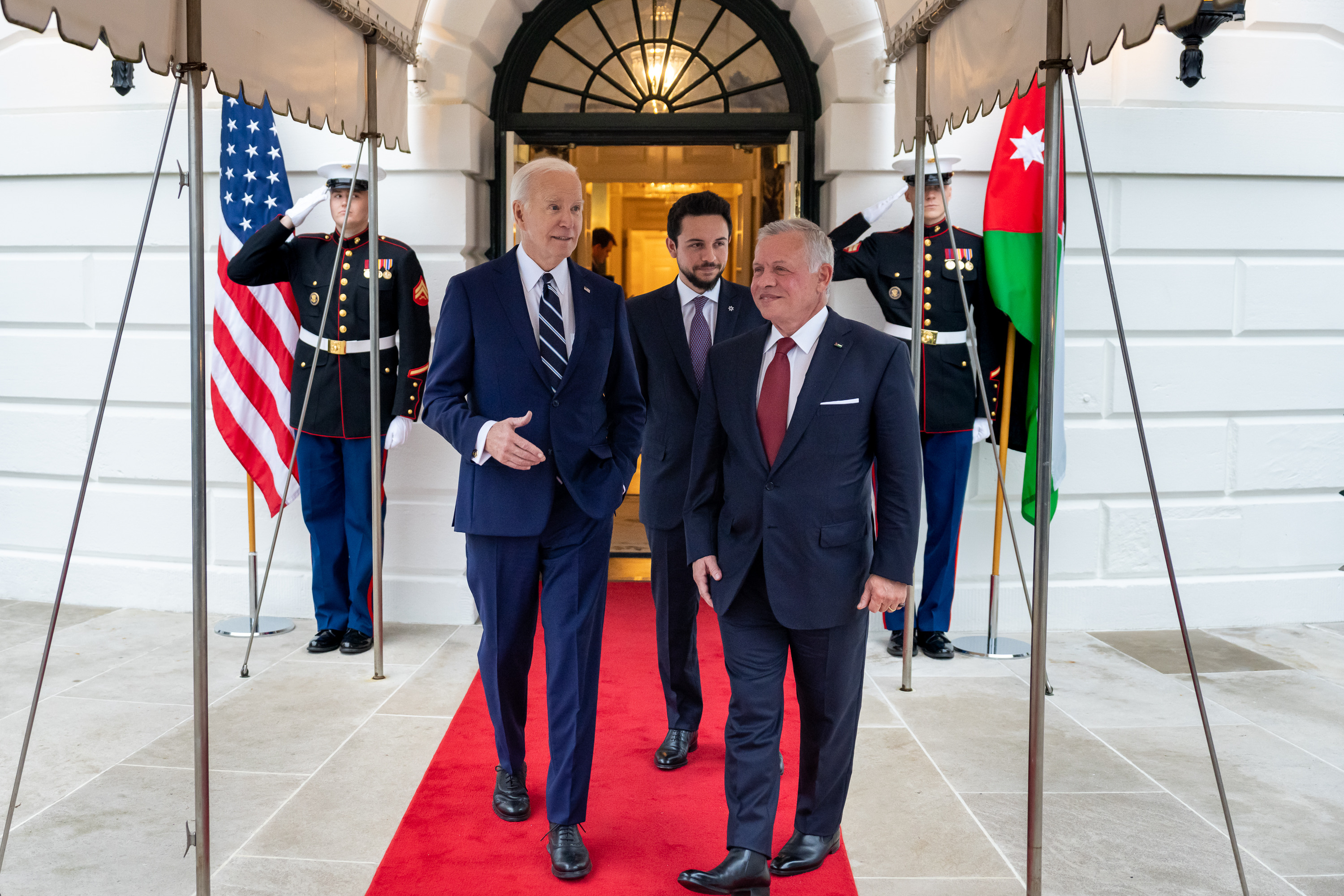
Biden, King Abdullah II and Crown Prince Hussein of Jordan, February 2024

During a July 2021 meeting at the White House with Jordanian King Abdullah II and Crown Prince Hussein, Biden expressed "strong U.S. support for Jordan," a longtime U.S. partner in the Middle East, pushed for improving Israel–Jordan relations, and supported military cooperation between Jordan and the U.S. He and King Abdullah II also discussed Jordan's economic future and the American donation of 500,000 COVID-19 vaccines to the Kingdom. The Biden Administration continued to provide military and economic aid to Jordan, whose struggling economy has been damaged by the COVID-19 pandemic.

=== North Africa ===
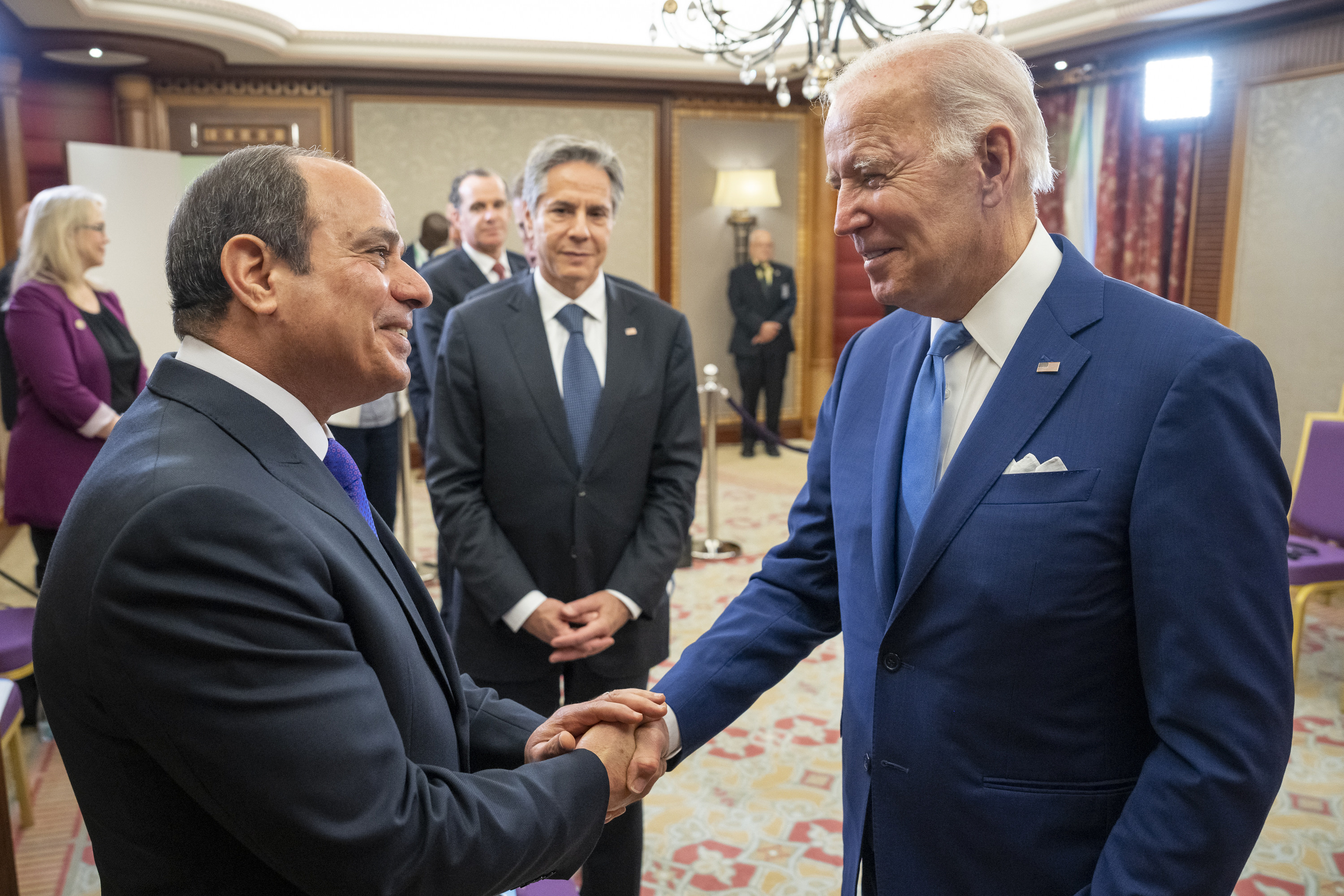
Biden and Egyptian President Abdel Fattah el-Sisi at the GCC+3 summit in Jeddah, Saudi Arabia, July 2022

The U.S. called for Russian, Turkish, and UAE forces (and their proxies) to immediately withdraw from Libya, after those countries ignored the January 2021 deadline for foreign forces and mercenaries to leave the country (as set by a UN-backed ceasefire signed in October 2019 to end the war among the countries' factions and their foreign supporters). Richard M. Mills Jr., the Acting U.S. Ambassador to the UN, said, "We call on all external parties, to include Russia, Turkey, and the UAE, to respect Libyan sovereignty and immediately cease all military intervention in Libya."

The Biden administration pressed the Egyptian government of Abdel Fattah el-Sisi to improve its poor human rights record, but nonetheless approved a $197 million sale of Rolling Airframe Missiles for the Egyptian Navy's coastal defenses in February 2021, citing the country's role in regional security as a major non-NATO ally.

=== Saudi Arabia, Yemen, and the Persian Gulf states ===
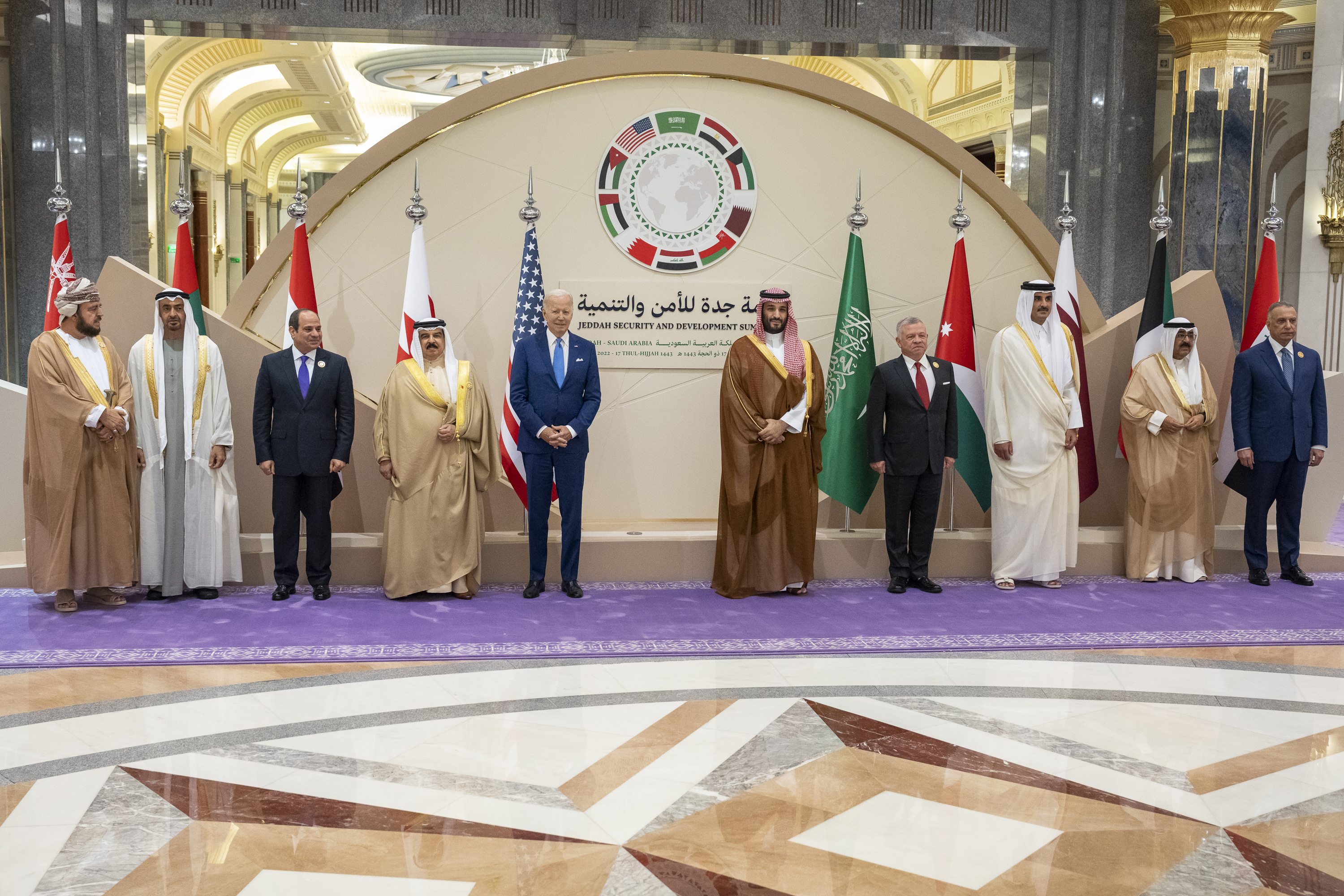
Biden with Arab leaders at the Gulf Cooperation Council summit in Jeddah, July 2022

On January 27, 2021, the day after Antony Blinken took office as Secretary of State, the Biden administration put a temporary freeze on arms sales to Saudi Arabia (specifically, of precision-guided munitions) and the United Arab Emirates (specifically, of F-35 fighter jets) pending a review of billions of dollars' worth of weapons transactions approved by the Trump administration.

In February 2021, shortly after taking office, Biden fulfilled a campaign pledge to end U.S. support for the five-year Saudi Arabian–led offensive in Yemen. The Saudi offensive caused a humanitarian crisis in Yemen (the poorest country in the Arabian Peninsula) and failed to defeat the Iran-backed Houthis. Biden called for the warring parties to adopt a cease-fire, open channels to allow the delivery of humanitarian aid, and resume the Yemeni peace process. Shortly thereafter, the Biden administration also removed the Houthis from the State Department list of foreign terrorist organizations, a designation that the Trump administration had made in its final days in office. The designation had threatened to halt the delivery of food and humanitarian aid to Yemenis. The Biden administration made clear that the U.S. would continue to defend Saudi Arabia against Houthi attacks, continue U.S. cooperation with the Saudi government on military and counterterrorism issues, and continue U.S. efforts against al-Qaeda in the Arabian Peninsula.

Biden chose to deal directly with King Salman, bypassing the young Crown Prince Mohammed bin Salman (MBS), the de facto Saudi leader, whose standing in Washington was seriously damaged by the assassination of dissident and journalist Jamal Khashoggi, his jailing of Saudi dissidents, and his role in the Yemeni war. The administration announced that it would not deal with MBS in any capacity except Saudi defense minister, the position he holds in addition to being crown prince and designated heir. In an attempt to repair the kingdom's image to a deeply skeptical new administration, the Saudi government undertook certain reforms in early 2021 that the U.S. had urged, including releasing imprisoned activist Loujain al-Hathloul and some other political prisoners, beginning judicial reforms, and revising state-approved school textbooks to eliminate certain material that promoted Islamic extremism, radicalization, and anti-Semitism. In February 2021, the Biden administration publicly released a report (long withheld by the Trump administration) by the Office of the Director of National Intelligence, containing U.S. intelligence's assessment that MBS had approved the Saudi operation that led to Khashoggi's brutal murder in October 2018, basing this conclusion on "the Crown Prince's control of decision-making in the Kingdom, the direct involvement of a key adviser and members of Muhammad bin Salman's protective detail in the operation, and the Crown Prince's support for using violent measures to silence dissidents abroad, including Khashoggi."

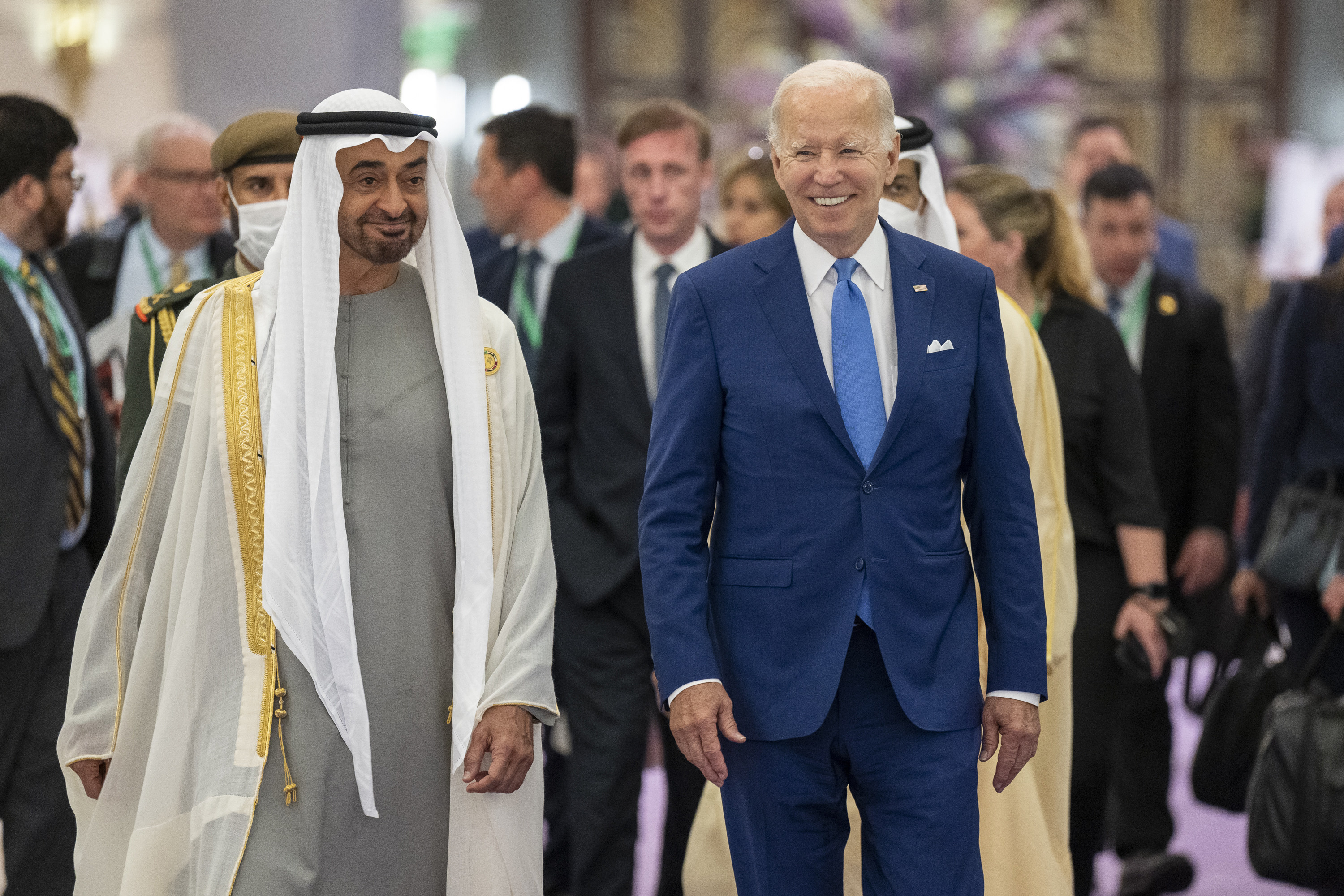
Biden and UAE's President Mohamed bin Zayed Al Nahyan, July 2022

After the report was released, the administration announced a new "Khashoggi ban" policy, allowing the U.S. government to bar visas for persons working for a foreign government that are directly engaged in "serious, extraterritorial counter-dissident activities, including those that suppress, harass, surveil, threaten, or harm journalists, activists, or other persons perceived to be dissidents for their work." The travel ban was imposed against 76 Saudi citizens, including Ahmad Asiri, the ex-Saudi intelligence chief who helped orchestrate the Khashoggi operation, and on the Saudi Royal Guard's Rapid Intervention Force, the MBS bodyguard unit under the crown prince's personal control. Despite pressure from human rights groups and some Democrats to do so, the administration did not impose any direct sanctions on MBS personally, determining that the damage to Saudi–U.S. relations would be too grave. Administration officials announced that it intended to use the "Khashoggi ban" policy against officials in other countries, such as Russia, China, and Turkey, that have attempted to silence critics living in the U.S., Europe, or other free nations.

Human rights groups have urged the Biden administration to prioritize the restoration of human rights in Bahrain as a key component of the U.S. foreign policy in the Middle East.

An administration source cited that they were preparing an overhaul of arms export policy, aimed at gaining a balance between American defense contractors and commitment to human rights. The new policy is said to affect arms sales to countries accused of human rights violations. Major arms sales like the $23 billion arms deal with the UAE also remained in limbo following the new shift in the policy, as progressives in the President's party are against the sale due to Emirates' role in the Yemeni Civil War.

=== Syria ===
Biden announces the death of Abu Ibrahim al-Hashimi al-Qurashi, February 3, 2022

On February 15, 2021, an Iranian-backed militia launched a missile attack on the airport in Erbil in northern Iraq, killing a Filipino contractor with the U.S.-led military coalition and wounding six others, including five Americans. In retaliation, Biden ordered an airstrike on the Iranian-backed Kataib Hezbollah (KH) and Kataib Sayyid al-Shuhada (KSS) militias in eastern Syria, just across the border with Iraq (between Al Qaem and Abu Kamal). This was the administration's first military action. Pentagon spokesperson John Kirby described the American retaliation as a proportionate response meant to punish the perpetrators but not to escalate hostilities with Iran. Biden called off a second planned strike at the last minute after military reconnaissance identified civilians in the intended target.

On June 27, 2021, the U.S. carried out a round of airstrikes against three operational and arms storage facilities of Iran-backed militias in the Syria-Iraq border region. The Pentagon press secretary stated that the action was in response to UAV attacks by the militias.

On February 3, 2022, ISIS leader Abu Ibrahim al-Hashimi al-Qurashi killed himself during a counterterrorism operation by the U.S. Special Forces in Atme in northwest Syria.

=== Turkey ===
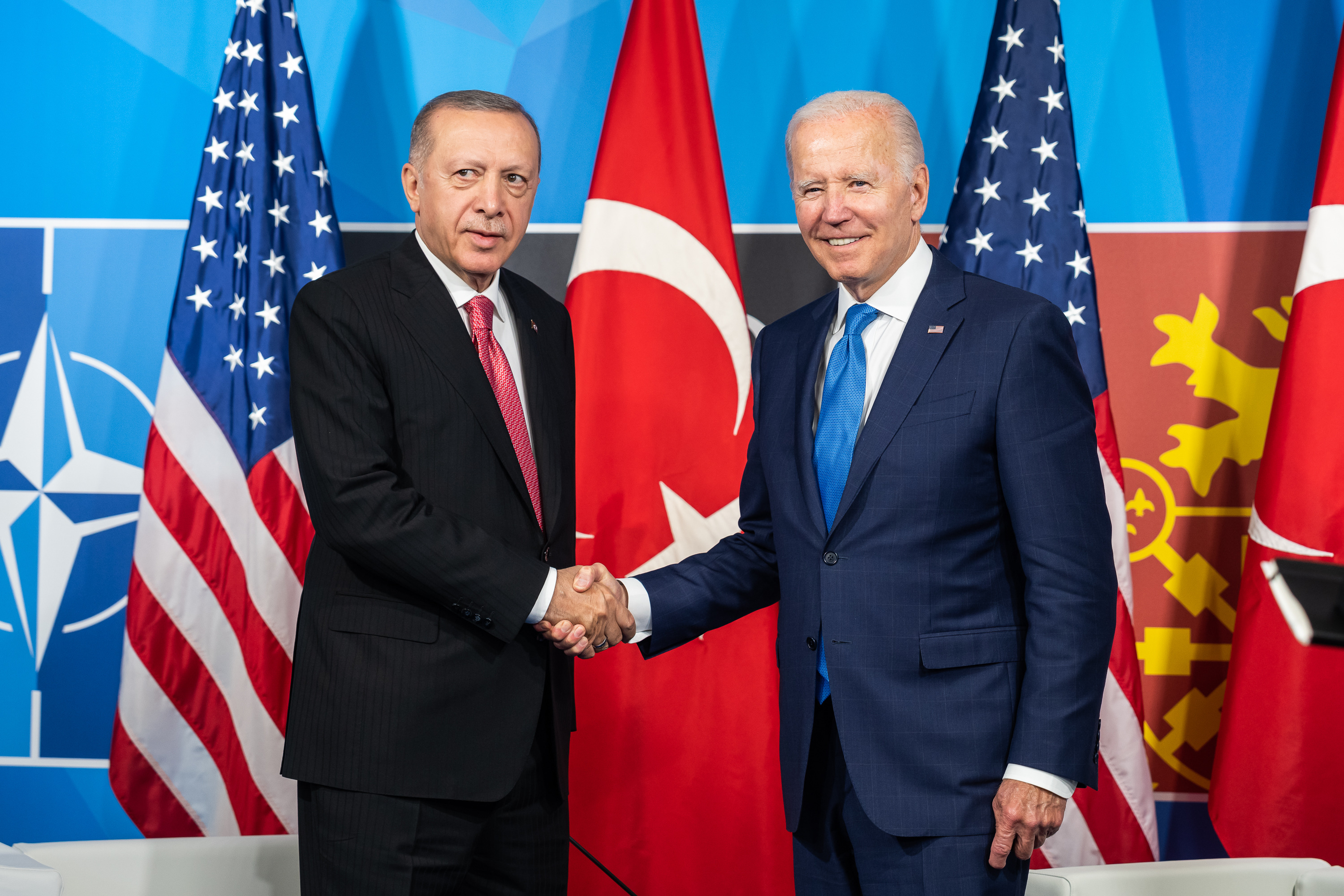
Biden and Turkish President Recep Tayyip Erdoğan, June 2022

In his confirmation hearings, Blinken stated that "we are very clear eyed" about the challenges posed by Turkey and said that the Turkish government under Recep Tayyip Erdoğan was "not acting like an ally" and would review if sanctions were necessary against Erdoğan's government due to its purchase of Russian S-400 missile systems. Under the previous administration, Turkish–U.S. relations were strained over policy differences regarding Syria, Turkey's oil exploration in the eastern Mediterranean, and Turkey's role in the 2020 Nagorno-Karabakh war, as well as Turkey's demands (rejected by the U.S.) for the extradition of dissident Islamic preacher Fethullah Gülen.

Biden praised President Erdoğan for "doing a great job" regarding the Black Sea Grain Initiative and the enlargement of NATO.

== South Asia ==
=== India ===
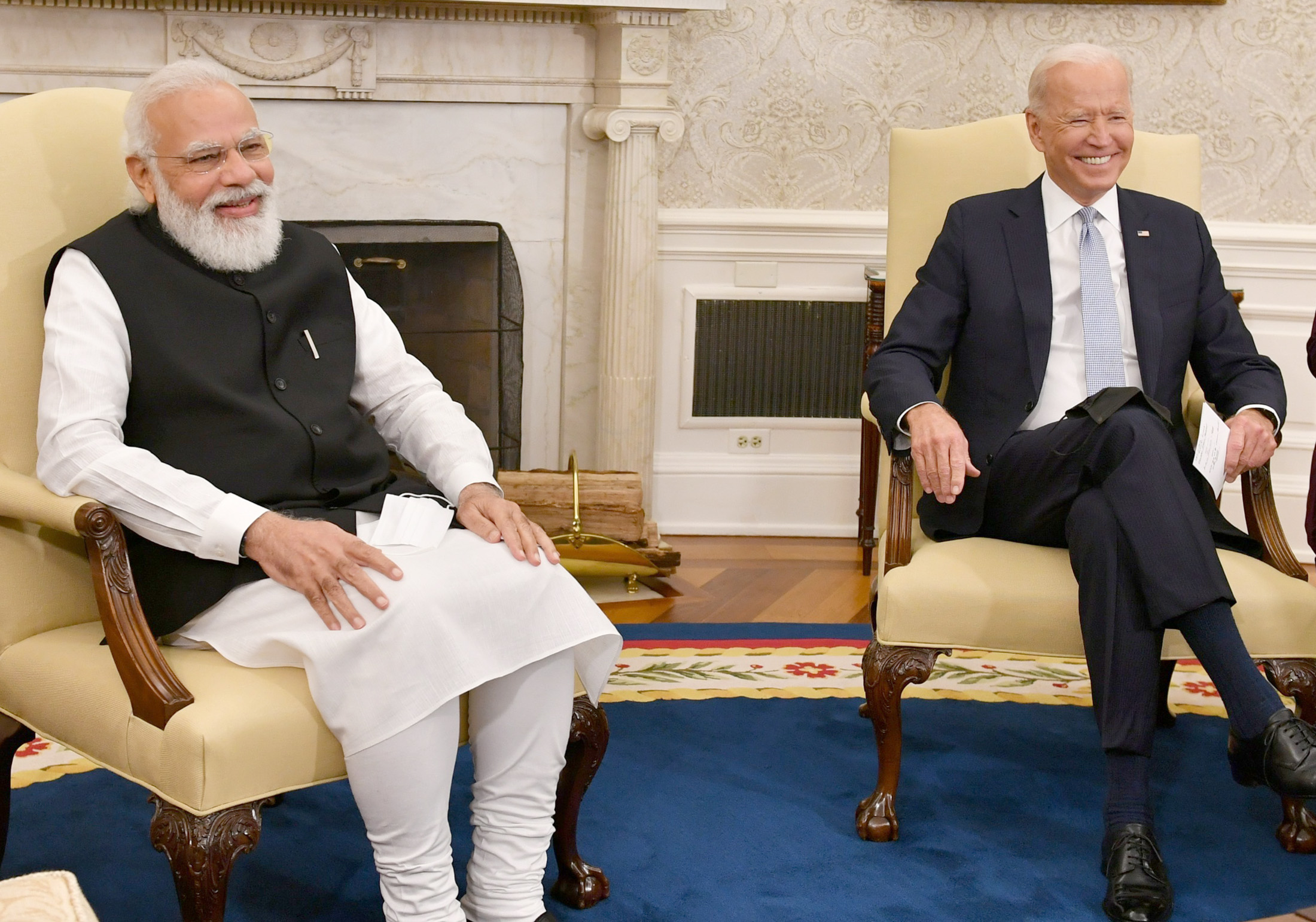
Biden and Indian Prime Minister Narendra Modi, September 2021

In their first telephone call on February 8, 2021, Biden and Indian Prime Minister Narendra Modi committed to close cooperation on the COVID-19 pandemic, climate change, and promoting a "free and open Indo-Pacific region" and agreed that the "rule of law and the democratic process must be upheld" in India's regional neighbor Burma, in which the military seized power in a coup. Addressing regional security issues posed by China, Biden and Modi expressed "support for freedom of navigation, territorial integrity, and a stronger regional architecture through the Quad" (the U.S., India, Japan, and Australia). Biden made no direct mention of the ongoing farmers' protests, but noted that a "shared commitment to democratic values" serves as the bedrock for the India–U.S. relationship. Modi stated after the call that both he and Biden are "committed to a rules-based international order" and "look forward to consolidating our strategic partnership."

=== Pakistan ===
Relations with Pakistan had been frosty, with Wendy Sherman making it clear that the administration will not currently build further bilateral relations as it had with India. Pakistani Prime Minister Imran Khan was reportedly "angry" for not having received a phone call from Biden yet, as of October 2021. Pakistan-India relations, and the situation in Afghanistan, played big parts in this - after Taliban militants took control of Kabul two months prior, Khan described it as “breaking the chains of slavery”. By the end of the year, Imran Khan was reportedly the "only major world leader" with whom Biden had not spoken with on the phone.

When Khan was facing a no-confidence motion in parliament, he blamed the United States for seeking to oust him, calling it part of an "international conspiracy". The United States denied these claims. Khan lost the no-confidence vote on April 9, 2022 and Shehbaz Sharif took his place as Prime Minister of Pakistan. In August 2023, according to a leaked diplomatic cable at the March 7, 2022 meeting from Pakistan received by The Intercept, the US State department encouraged removal of Imran Khan owing to his neutral stance on the Russian invasion of Ukraine.

=== Afghanistan ===
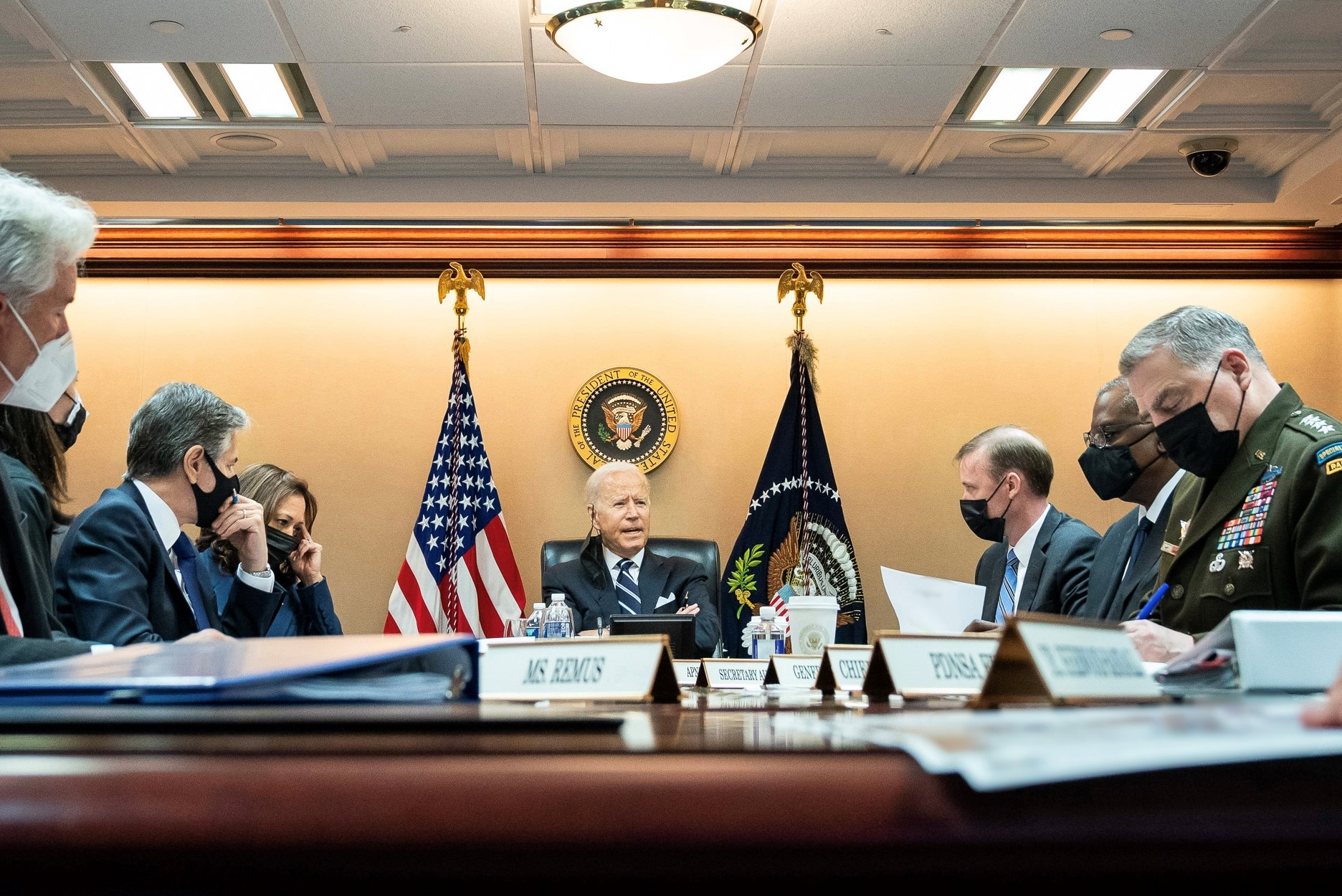
Biden meets with national security officials following the fall of Kabul, August 18, 2021

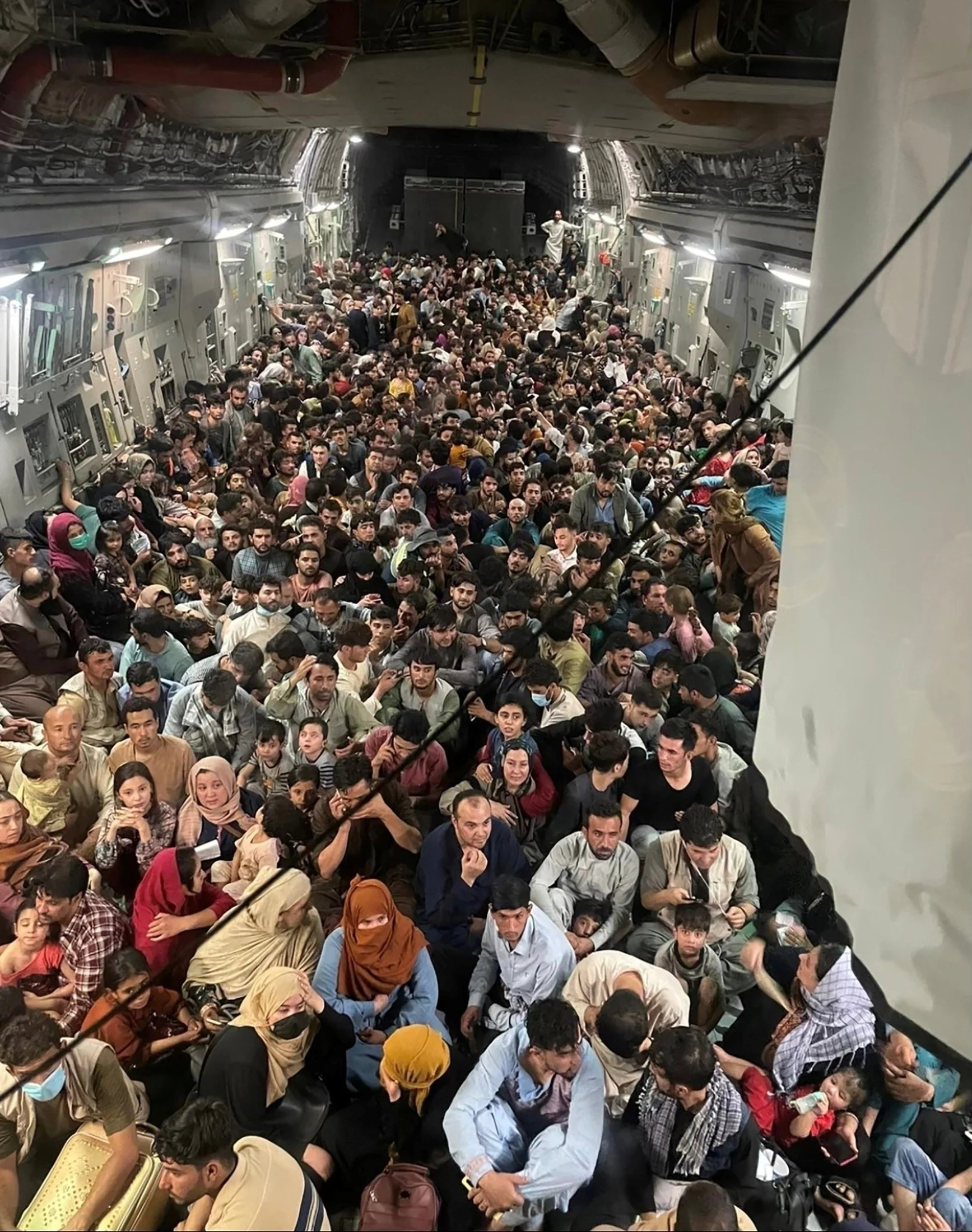
A C-17 of the U.S. Air Force evacuating Afghan nationals out of Kabul on August 15, 2021

After Biden took office, his administration began a broad review of the U.S.'s policy in Afghanistan, where 2,500 U.S. troops were stationed at the beginning of Biden's term.

In early February 2021, shortly after Biden took office, the bipartisan Afghanistan Study Group, a panel established by Congress in 2019, issued its report, recommended that the administration slow the further withdrawal of U.S. troops in Afghanistan, keeping U.S. troops after a May 1 deadline set by the February 2020 U.S.-Taliban Doha agreement reached under the Trump administration. The Study Group, led by former general Joseph Dunford and former U.S. Senator Kelly Ayotte, warned against a complete U.S. military withdrawal because the Taliban had not fully complied with their obligations under the agreement and because the panel viewed a quick withdrawal of remaining U.S. forces as a risk factor for renewed Afghan civil war, terrorist threats, and insurgency; the panel recommended that U.S. forces be further reduced as security conditions in the country improve.

Biden's Secretary of State Antony Blinken discussed the U.S. policy review with Afghan President Ashraf Ghani in February 2021, saying that the U.S. was committed to "a just and durable political settlement and permanent and comprehensive ceasefire" and would continue to consult "with Afghan leaders, NATO allies and international partners" on the future of the February 2020 deal. Later that month, in an unusually blunt letter from Blinken to Ghani, the U.S. expressed frustration with the stalled Afghan negotiations, in which Ghani was frequently intransigent and resisted the formation of an interim Afghan government that would advance the peace process but also probably end his presidency. The U.S. proposed a UN-led peace conference, and urged Ghani to participate "to move matters more fundamentally and quickly toward a settlement and a permanent and comprehensive cease-fire."

On April 13, 2021, the White House announced that the remaining 2,500 troops in Afghanistan would withdraw by September 11, 2021. The U.S. government commented that it would continue to support the Afghan government regarding a possible Taliban military victory. The deadline was extended from that of May 1, 2021, previously announced by the Trump administration.

By early July 2021, most of the American troops in Afghanistan were withdrawn. Biden addressed the withdrawal, stating that: "The likelihood there's going to be the Taliban overrunning everything and owning the whole country is highly unlikely." However, on August 15, amid an offensive by the Taliban, the Afghan government collapsed and Afghan President Ashraf Ghani fled the country, leaving the Taliban in full control of Afghanistan.

During the initial siege of Kabul and the subsequent collapse of the Afghan government, Biden was vacationing at Camp David. Facing mounting criticism for the administration's handling of the event, Biden returned to the White House on August 16 where he delivered an address to the American people defending his decision to withdraw U.S. forces from the country. In his remarks, Biden blamed the Afghan National Army for failing to adequately defend against the Taliban, saying, "American troops cannot and should not be fighting in a war and dying in a war that Afghan forces are not willing to fight for themselves."

The events in Afghanistan were one of the causes for Biden's approval rating declining in July and August 2021.

Many commentators have drawn comparisons between the withdraw and evacuation of U.S. forces in Afghanistan with the fall of Saigon at the end of the Vietnam War.

Biden announces the death of Ayman al-Zawahiri, August 1, 2022

On July 31, 2022, al-Qaeda leader Ayman al-Zawahiri was killed in Kabul by an American drone strike approved by Biden.

On September 24, 2024, the House Foreign Affairs Committee voted to recommend U.S. Secretary of State Antony Blinken be held in contempt of Congress for failing to comply with a subpoena seeking information about the 2021 U.S. withdrawal from Afghanistan.

On September 25, 2024, the United States House of Representatives passed a resolution condemning the Biden-Harris Administration for the U.S. withdrawal from Afghanistan. The resolution passed 219 - 194, with ten Democrats and all Republicans voting in favor.

=== Bangladesh ===
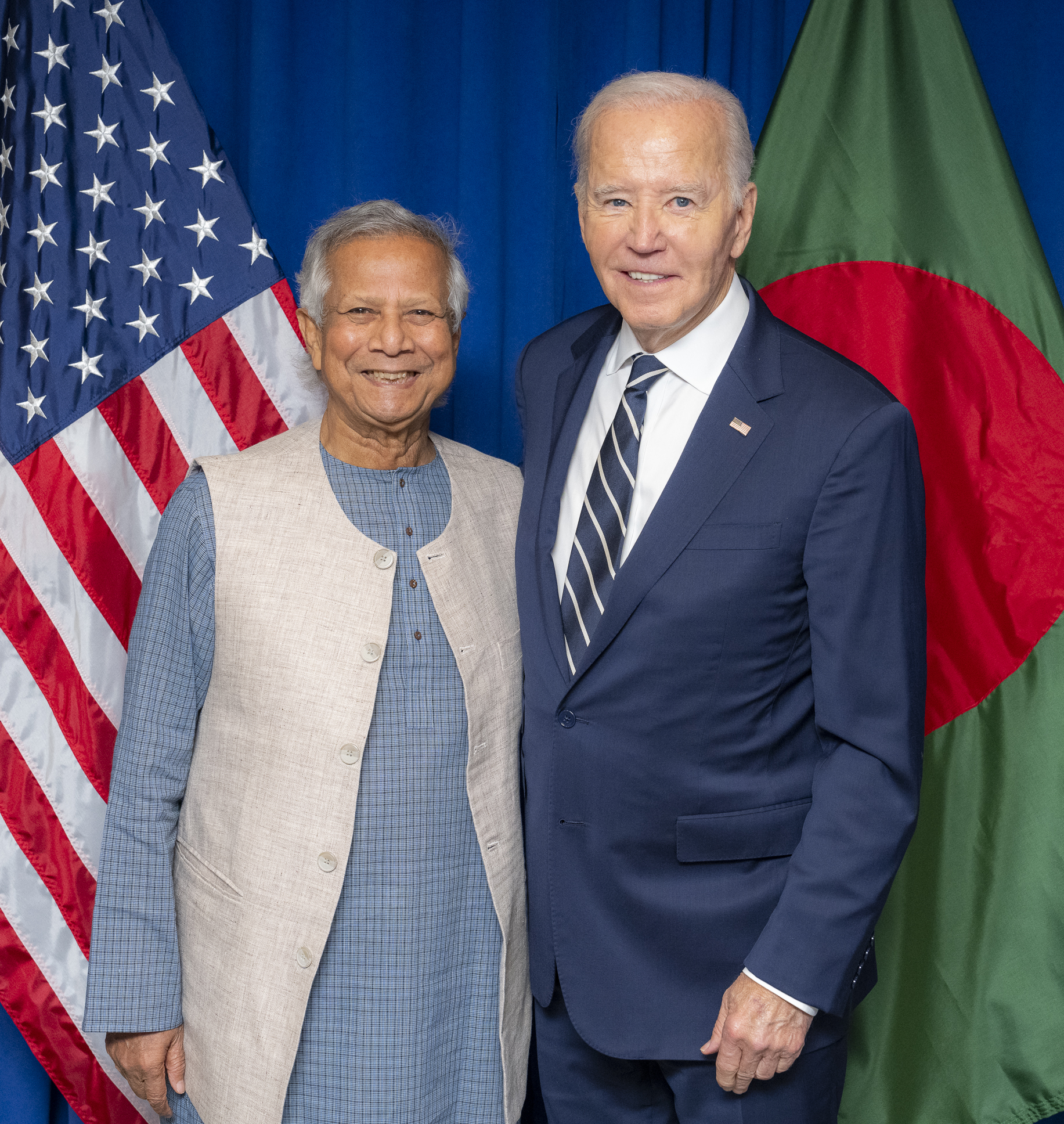
Biden and Bangladesh Chief Adviser Muhammad Yunus, September 2024

Since June 2021, the United States has shared 114,570,820 safe and effective COVID-19 vaccine doses with the people of Bangladesh – free of cost. Bangladesh is the largest recipient of U.S. COVID-19 vaccine donations with over 150 million doses. Since the beginning of the pandemic, U.S. support has trained more than 50,000 healthcare providers and other workers on safely administering vaccines across 64 districts, donated 18 freezer vans, 750 freezer units, and 8,000 vaccine carriers to help transport 71 million doses of vaccines to remote areas and directly administered 84 million vaccinations.

After the Biden administration imposed visa sanctions on Bangladeshi officials for human rights and other reasons, it was severely criticized by Prime Minister Sheikh Hasina.

== Indo-Pacific strategy ==
=== Quad ===
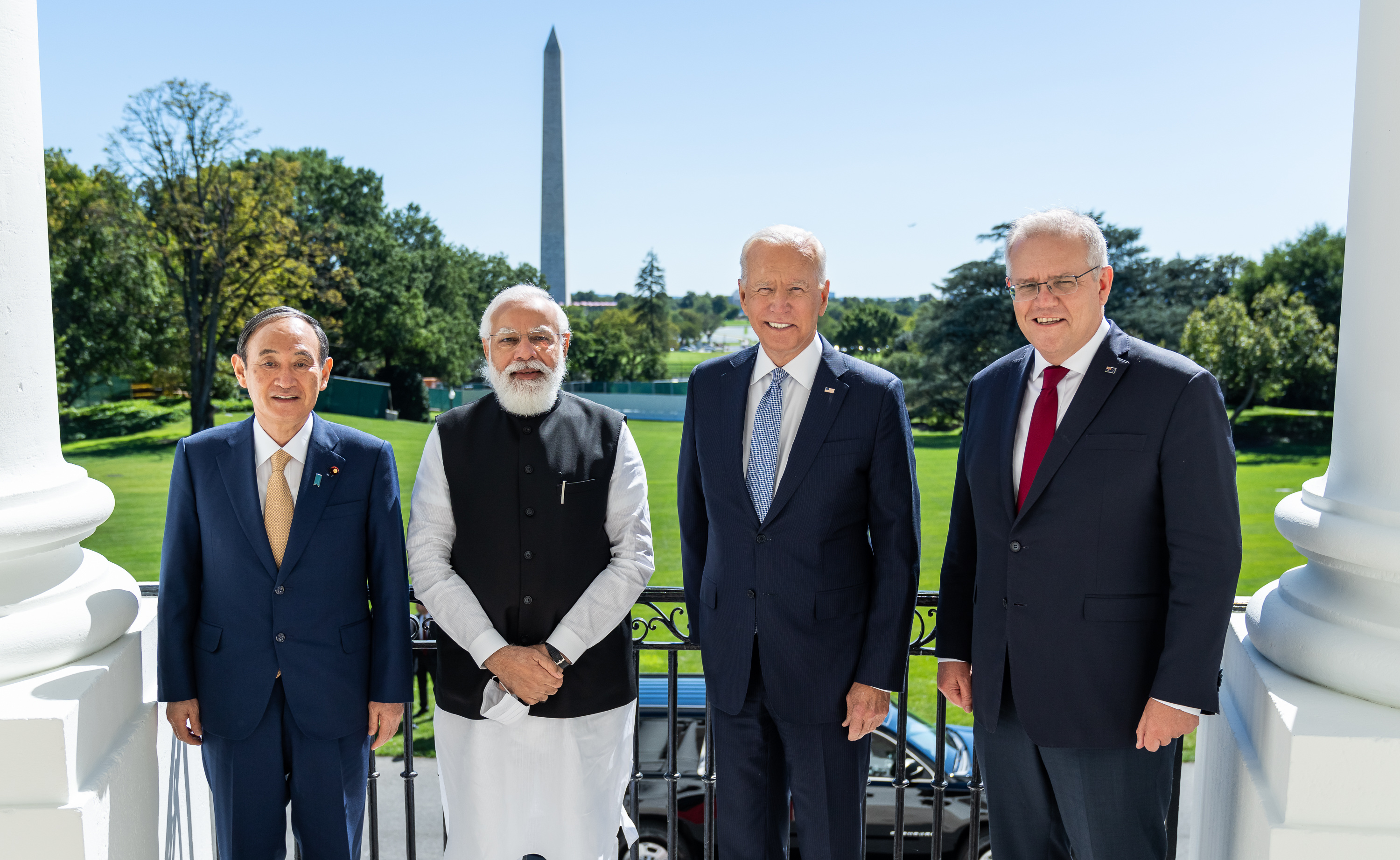
President Biden hosted the Quad meeting at the White House, September 24, 2021.

In March 2021, Biden held a virtual meeting with leaders of Japan, India and Australia, an alliance of countries known as the Quadrilateral Security Dialogue, or the Quad, that work together to address China's expansionism in the Indo-Pacific region. A few days later, the administration officials, including secretary of state Antony Blinken and secretary of defense Lloyd Austin, met with U.S. allies in Asia and imposed sanctions on senior Chinese officials. Austin also visited India to deepen the defense ties between the two countries. In September 2021, Biden hosted the first in-person meeting of the Quad at the White House.

=== ASEAN ===
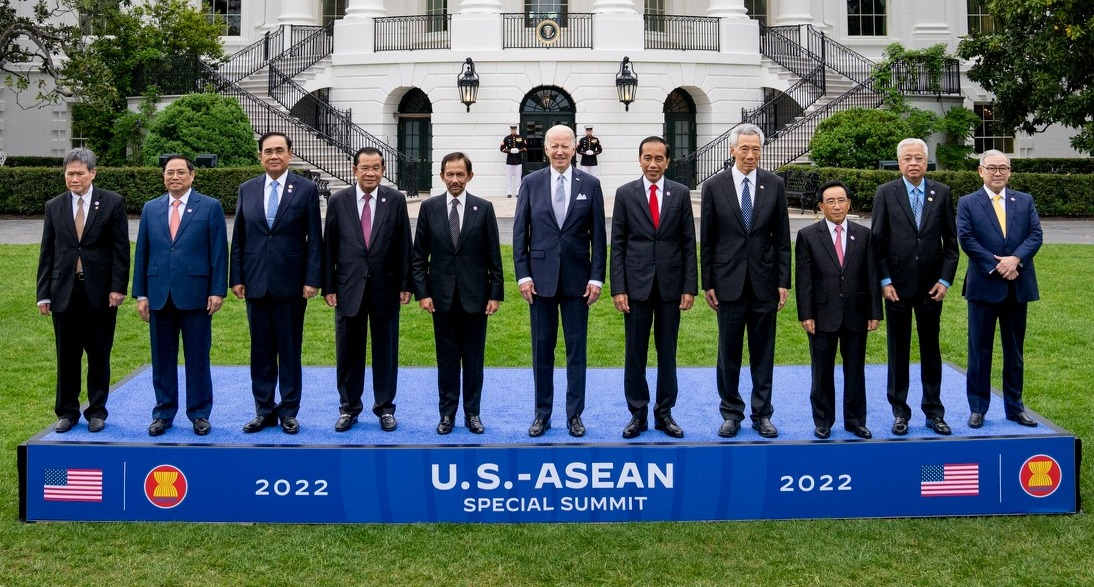
Biden with ASEAN leaders at the U.S.–ASEAN summit, May 2022

On October 27, 2021, President Biden attended a virtual summit with ASEAN (East Asia Summit), which was last attended by a U.S. president in 2017. Biden urged "shared vision for a region where every country can compete and succeed on a level playing field." The 9 of 10 attending ASEAN members were Brunei, Cambodia, Indonesia, Laos, Malaysia, the Philippines, Singapore, Thailand and Vietnam. Myanmar's military government skipped the summit amid controversies with Brunei, the current chair of the summit, and Cambodia. Biden's comments on the summit focused on democracy in the region and the international rules-based order. The National Security Council's East Asia director, Edgard Kagan, clarified the aims of the Quad as not intended to be "an Asian NATO" and exists alongside the existing ASEAN. Additionally, the White House planned to fund $102 million towards climate, health, economic, and education programs to advance a strategic partnership with ASEAN.

In 2022, President Biden announced the elevation of US-ASEAN relations to a Comprehensive Strategic Partnership (CSP) at the U.S.–ASEAN Summit in Phnom Penh.

In September 2023, Vice President Kamala Harris attended the 11th US–ASEAN summit in Jakarta. In her prepared remarks, she announced a planned establishment of the first U.S.-ASEAN Center in Washington, D.C. through a public-private partnership, with a mission of further strengthening US-ASEAN ties.

On December 14, 2023, the State Department announced the formal opening of the U.S.–ASEAN Center in D.C., launched in partnership with Arizona State University. Describing the center as a demonstration of "the next step in the US-ASEAN relationship," Elizabeth M. Allen noted it will be "an inclusive and accessible space for scholars to dig into important issues and research," "a convening platform for the diplomatic community and U.S. officials as well as think tankers, civil society, and private sector representatives," "a venue for business roundtables that strengthen networks," "a forum for conferences that engages leading minds and diverse young people on the pressing issues," as well as "a unique site for high level dialogues."

=== IPEF ===
On May 23, 2022, Biden launched the Indo-Pacific Economic Framework for Prosperity (IPEF) to counter growing Chinese economic and political influence in the Indo-Pacific region. At the time of its launch, the IPEF had 12 partners, including Australia, Brunei, India, Indonesia, Japan, South Korea, Malaysia, New Zealand, the Philippines, Singapore, Thailand, and Vietnam. In response, China described the proposed grouping as a "closed and exclusive club". National Security Adviser Jake Sullivan defended the IPEF by highlighting the diverse nature of the grouping's membership. In November 2023, under pressure from Congressional Democrats, the Biden administration halted plans for the IPEF's trade component.

== Oceania ==
=== Australia ===
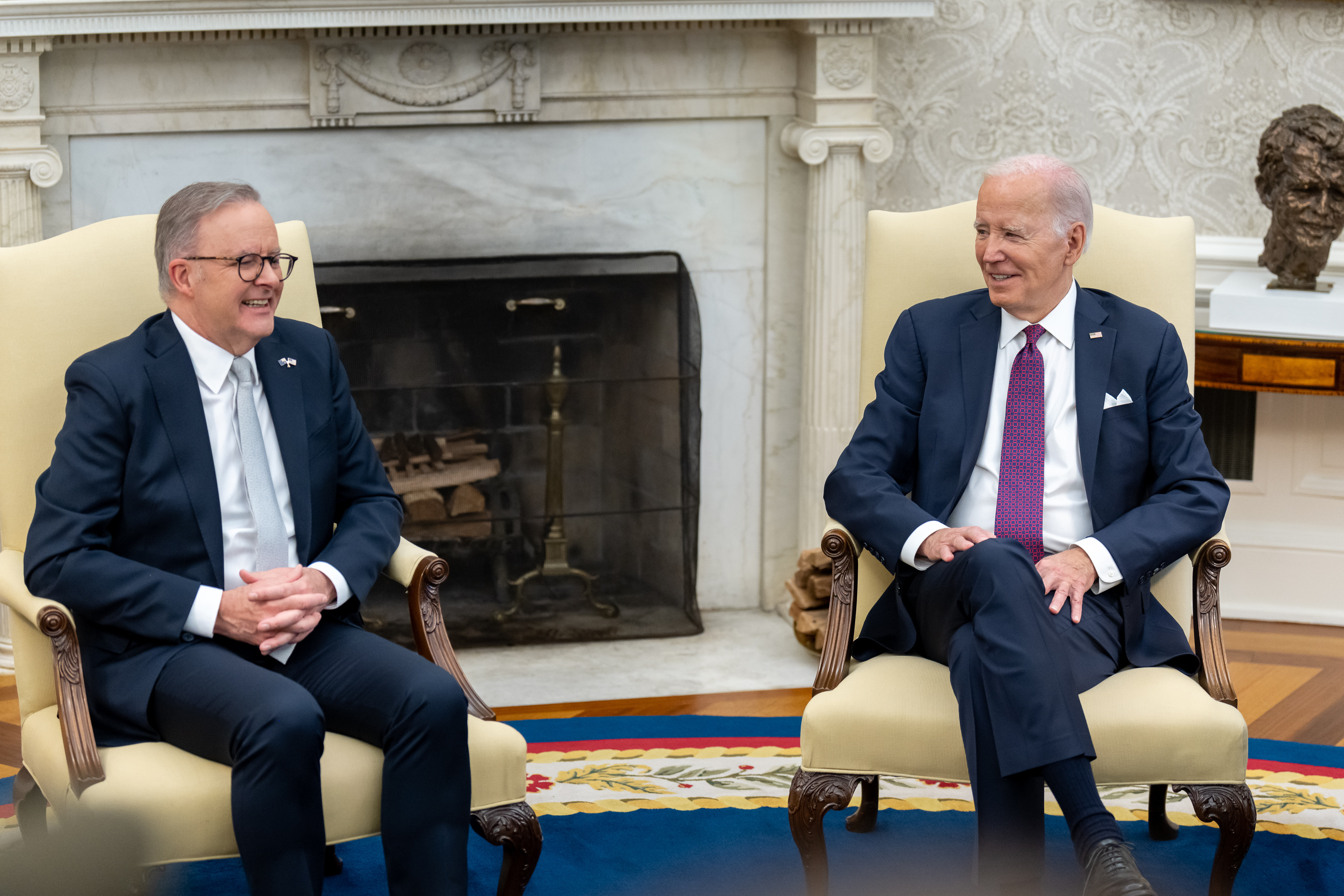
Biden and Australian Prime Minister Anthony Albanese, October 2023

On September 15, 2021, Biden held a meeting about AUKUS with British Prime Minister Boris Johnson and Australian Prime Minister Scott Morrison to announce that the U.S. will share their nuclear submarine technology with Australia as part of a nuclear propulsion and defense partnership with the country and the U.K. It was the first time since 1958, when then-President Dwight D. Eisenhower gave the technology to Great Britain, that America shared nuclear submarine technology with the British. Biden stated that the deal was a way to "address both the current strategic environment in the (Indo-Pacific) region and how it may evolve".

=== New Zealand ===
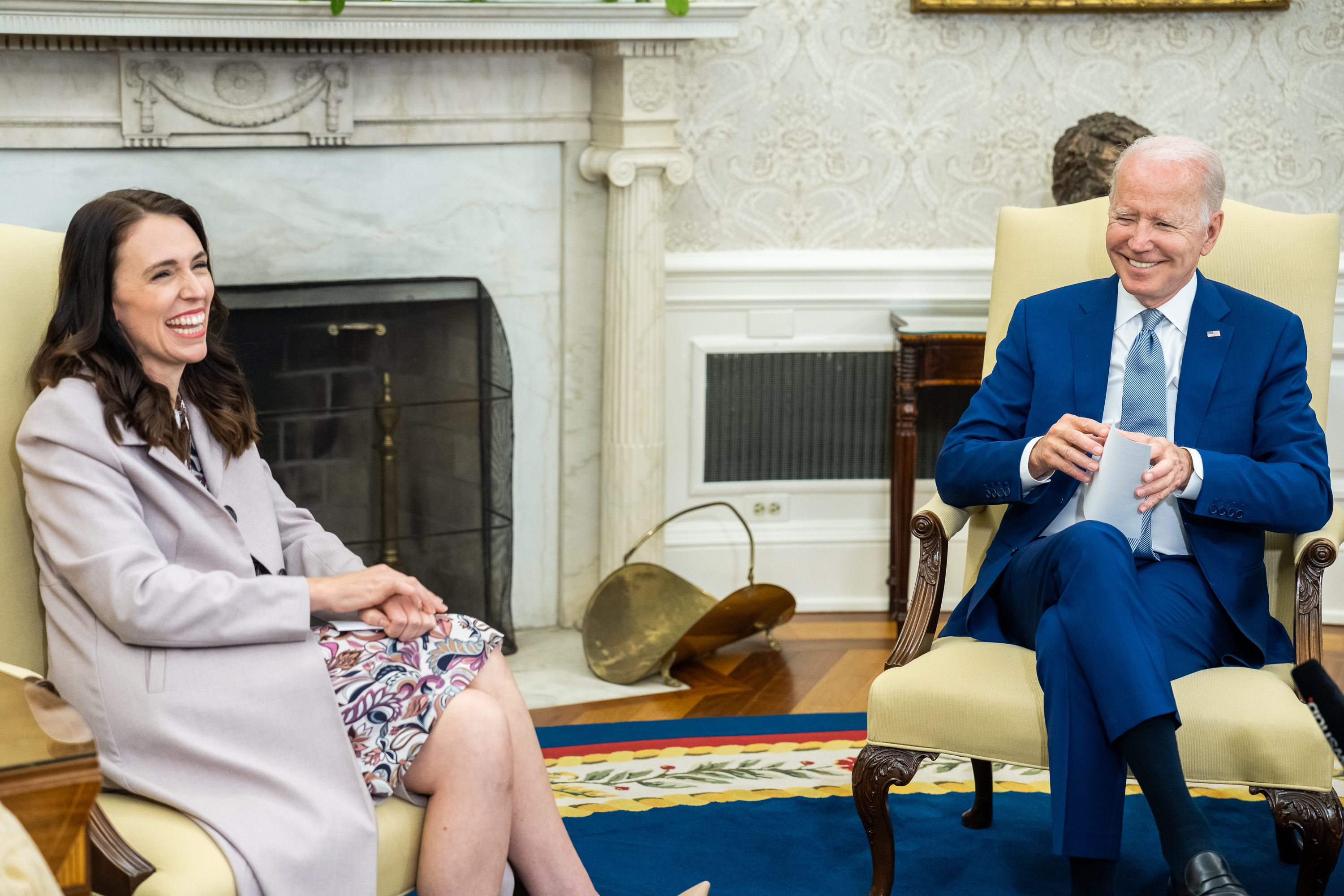
Biden and New Zealander Prime Minister Jacinda Ardern, May 2022

In early December 2021, Ardern participated in the virtual Summit for Democracy that was hosted by US President Joe Biden. In her address, she talked about bolstering democratic resilience in the age of COVID-19 followed by panel discussions. Ardern also announced that New Zealand would contribute an additional NZ$1 million to supporting Pacific countries' anti-corruption efforts, as well as contributing to UNESCO's Global Media Defence Fund and the International Fund for Public Interest Media.

On 1 June 2022, Prime Minister Jacinda Ardern met with President Joe Biden and Vice President Kamala Harris to reaffirm the US–New Zealand bilateral relationship. The two heads of government also issued a joint statement reaffirming bilateral cooperation on various international issues including the Indo-Pacific, the South China Sea dispute, Chinese tensions with Taiwan, alleged human rights violations in Hong Kong and Xinjiang, and support for Ukraine in response to the Russian invasion of Ukraine. In addition, Ardern and Biden reaffirmed cooperation in the areas of climate change mitigation, oceanic governance, managing pollution and pandemics, and combating extremism. In response, Chinese Foreign Ministry official Zhao Lijian accused New Zealand and the United States of spreading disinformation about China's diplomatic engagement with Pacific Islands countries and interfering in Chinese internal affairs. He urged Washington to end its alleged Cold War mentality towards China and Wellington to adhere to its stated "independent foreign policy."

On 9–11 July 2024, Prime Minister Christopher Luxon attended the 2024 NATO summit as an Indo-Pacific ally. During the visit, he met US President Joe Biden along with several Republican and Democratic senators and Congressmen, including Bill Hagerty, Michael McCaul, Gregory Meeks, and Ben Cardin. In addition, Luxon met several international leaders, including British Prime Minister Keir Starmer, Ukrainian President Volodymyr Zelenskyy, Japanese Prime Minister Fumio Kishida, South Korean President Yoon Suk Yeol, and Australian Deputy Prime Minister Richard Marles. On 11 July, Luxon visited San Francisco, where he met Californian Governor Gavin Newsom.

=== Papua New Guinea ===
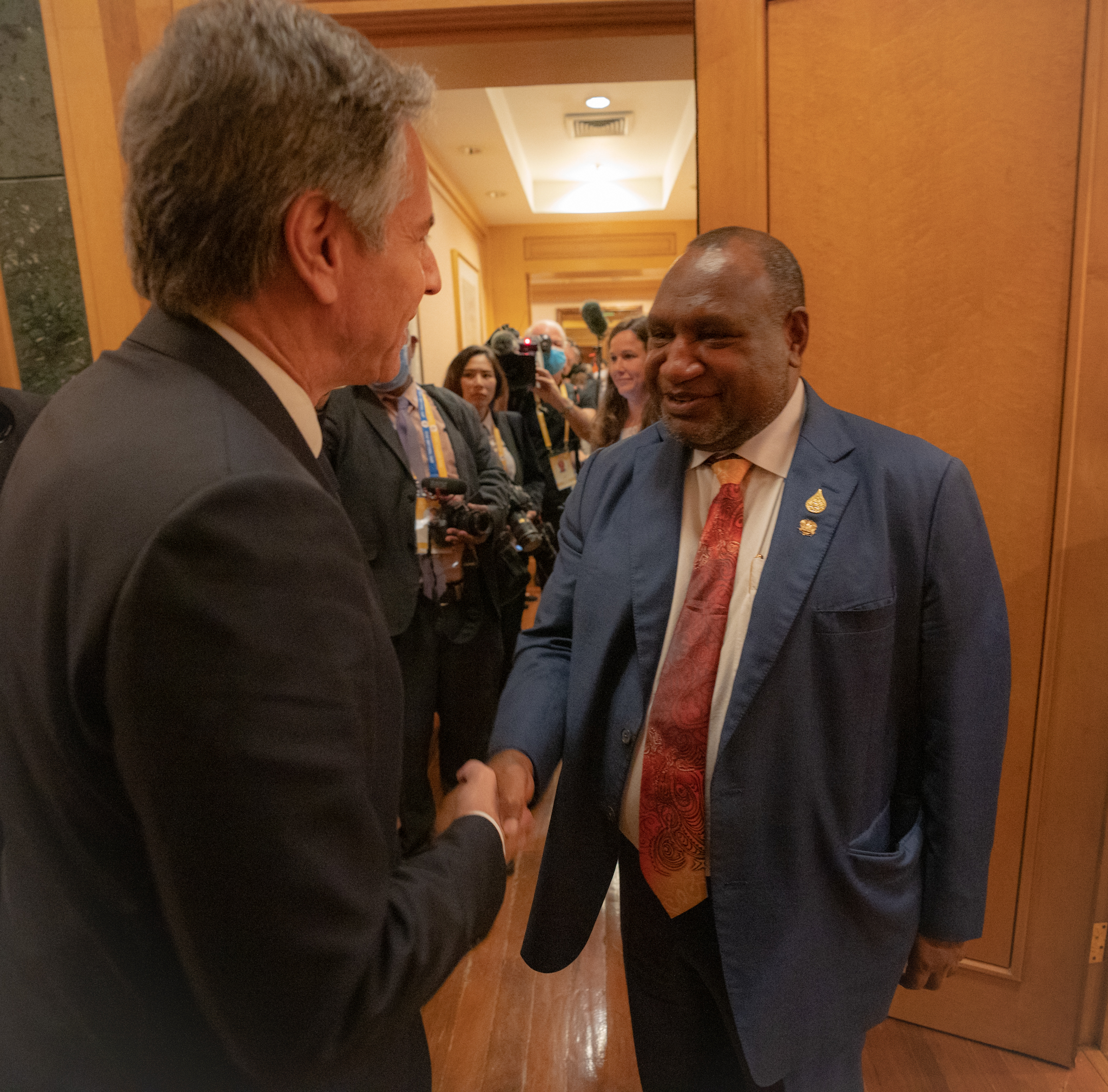
James Marape with US Secretary of State Antony Blinken in 2022

In May 2023, a defense agreement was announced between the two countries. The PNG Prime Minister James Marape agreed to release the full details of the agreement but categorically stated that the US would be prohibited from launching an offensive war from the Island. The agreement is seen as a part of the on-going tension between the United States and China over influence in the region. On 22 May, the United States and Papuan governments formally signed two defense and maritime agreements. The agreements permit use of Lombrum Naval Base and Momote Airport. In response, students from several Papuan universities including the Papua New Guinea University of Technology, University of Goroka, and University of Papua New Guinea staged protests to coincide with the signing of the bilateral security treaty, calling for transparency and clarity.

In November and December 2023, Papua New Guinea voted against an "immediate humanitarian ceasefire" in the UN General Assembly. New Zealand newspaper Te Ao Maori News claimed it "looks as though they’re aligning themselves with Israel and the United States". University of Canterbury professor Steven Ratuva claimed this was because of "the rise of evangelical movements in the region which are linked to the evangelical movements in the United States, which are in support of Trump, in support of Israel and Zionism generally". Ratuva also described their economic reliance on the United States as a factor in the decision.

== US-Pacific Island Country Summit ==
The United States–Pacific Island Country Summit was a meeting hosted by Joe Biden with Pacific Island leaders held on September 28–29, 2022. The Pacific leaders endorsed the declaration of the United States–Pacific partnership that commits the United States and the Pacific Island countries to work together "in the face of a worsening climate crisis and an increasingly complex geopolitical environment".

== Sub-Saharan Africa ==
Biden delivers remarks to the African Union Summit, February 2021

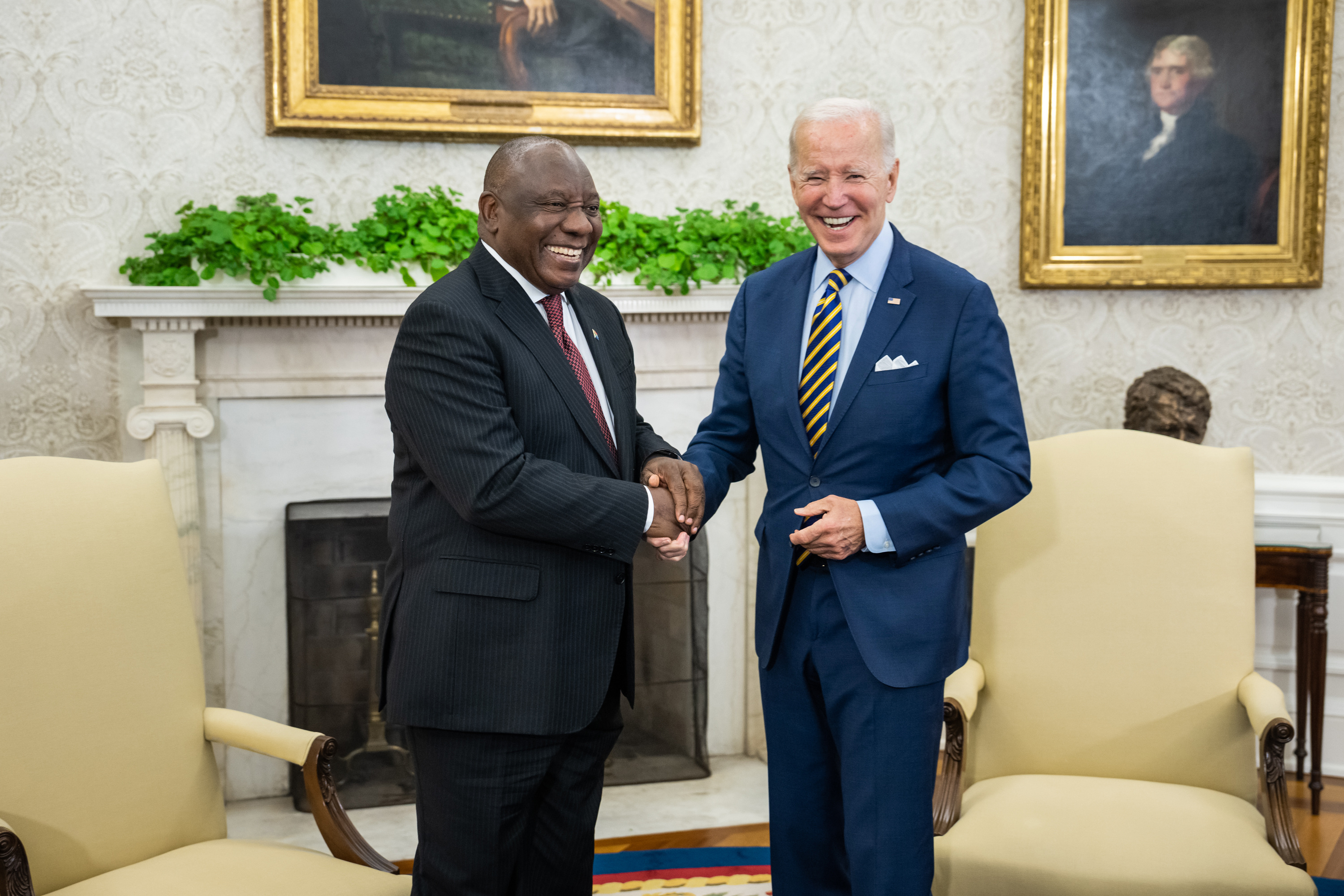
Biden and South African President Cyril Ramaphosa, September 2022

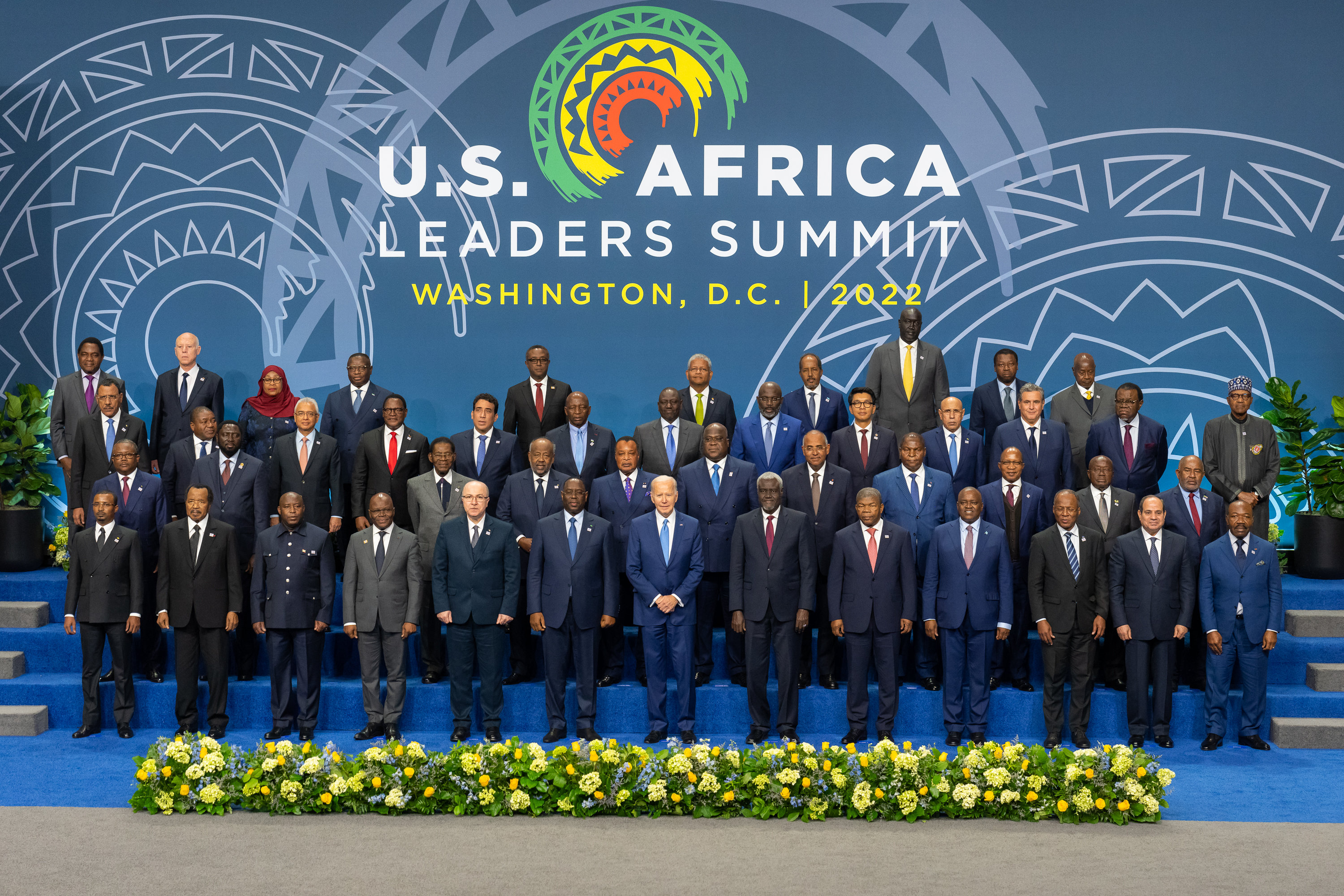
Biden with African leaders at the United States–Africa Leaders Summit, December 2022

=== Eritrea and Ethiopia ===
In January 2021, the U.S. demanded that Eritrea withdraw from the Tigray War in Ethiopia. Humanitarian supplies were being blocked from entering Ethiopia, which all parties in the conflict were accused of causing. U.S. Agency for International Development (USAID) head Samantha Power called for "unimpeded humanitarian access to prevent famine".

=== Liberia ===
In January 2021, Biden sent a memorandum to the U.S. State Department reinstating Deferred Enforced Departure (DED) to Liberians.

=== Somalia ===
Although most U.S. troops were withdrawn from Somalia in early January 2021, an undisclosed number of U.S. troops participated in a training program against al-Shabaab jihadists on January 31. In July 2021, the Biden administration carried out its first airstrike against al-Shabaab, in the city of Galkayo.

=== Sudan ===
USAID Administrator Samantha Power arrived in Sudan in July 2021, to meet with senior transition officials. Sudan had been ruled by military and civilian leaders ever since the deposition of longtime Sudanese leader Omar al-Bashir in a military coup amid popular protests. Power will meet chairman of the transitional military-civilian Sovereignty Council Gen. Abdel Fattah al-Burhan and Prime Minister Abdalla Hamdok at Khartoum, the Sudanese capital.

Power described Sudan as "an inspiring example to the world that no leader is ever permanently immune from the will of their people;" she is expected to strengthen U.S. ties with the pro-Western transitional government and leverage USAID's resources to support Sudan's transition to a civilian democracy.

== Multilateral organizations and policy ==
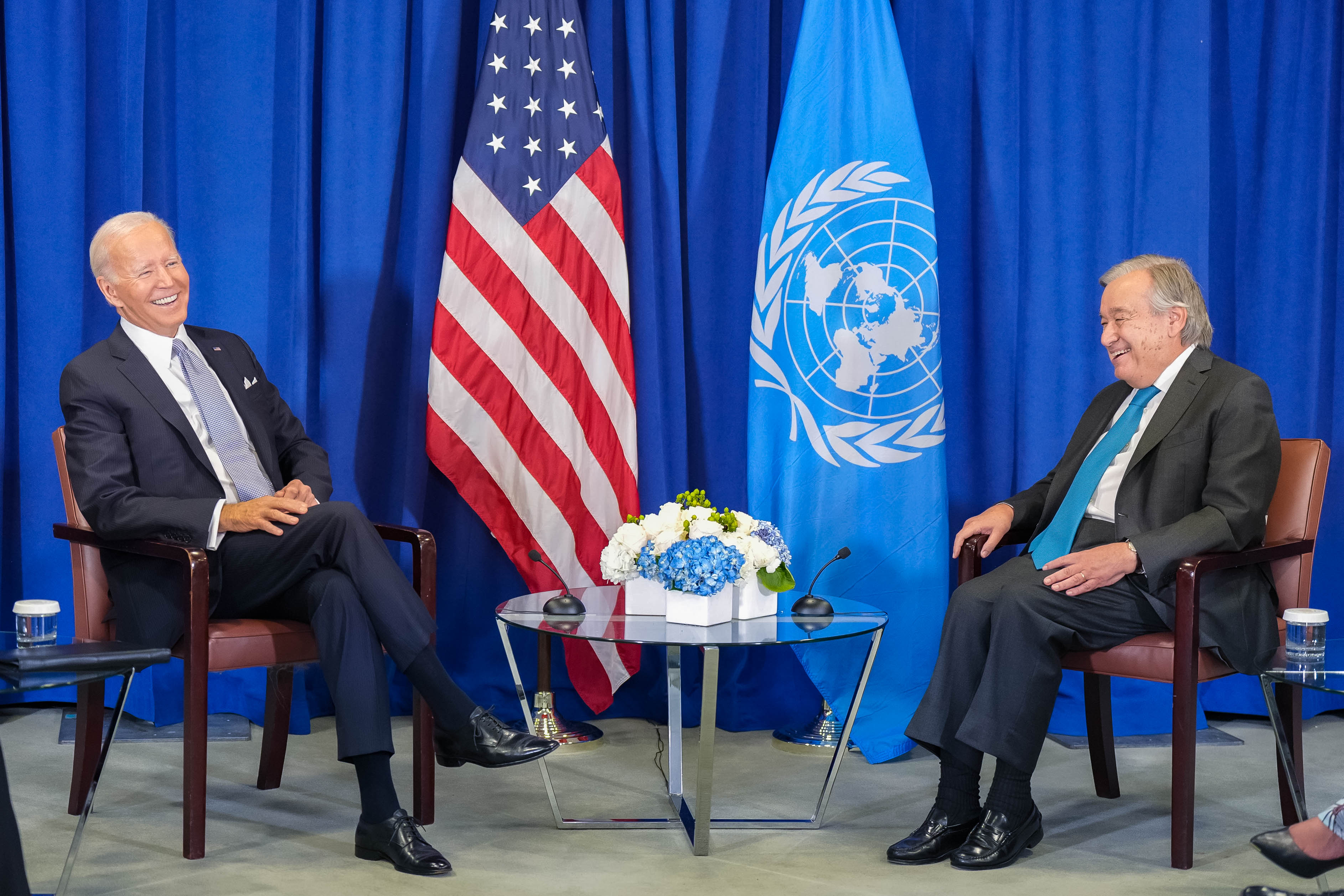
Biden and UN Secretary-General António Guterres, September 2022

Consistent with his campaign pledges, Biden brought the U.S. back into several multilateral organizations and agreements.

=== Human rights ===
In early February 2021, soon after taking office, the Biden returned the United States to the United Nations Human Rights Council (which the Trump administration withdrew from in 2018) and directed the State Department "to re-engage immediately and robustly" with the council; Blinken, Biden's secretary of state, said that "The best way to improve the Council, so it can achieve its potential, is through robust and principled U.S. leadership."

Biden also rescinded the Mexico City Policy. The policy, first adopted under Reagan, had been alternately imposed under Republican administrations and rescinded under Democratic ones, and was extended in scope under Trump. Biden's repeal of the rule was welcomed by, among other, Doctors Without Borders and Amnesty International. Biden also withdrew the U.S. from the Geneva Consensus Declaration, an anti-abortion declaration that the U.S. had joined under Trump, and restored funding to the UN Population Fund.

=== COVID-19 pandemic response and global health ===
Biden signed an executive order on his first day in office, halting the U.S. withdrawal from the World Health Organization that Trump had ordered (but which had not yet taken effect). Biden also appointed Dr. Anthony Fauci, the U.S. government's chief infectious disease scientist, as the head of the delegation to the WHO. The U.S. had been the largest financial contributor to the WHO, providing roughly one-fifth of its annual budget. Fauci stated the US would meet its financial obligations of $400–$500 million/year, and rejoin the COVAX global framework for vaccinating people in low to middle-income countries which had been stalled by lack of funding.

Biden renewed COVID-19-related travel bans barring non-U.S. nationals from several parts of the world, including the Schengen Area, Ireland, the United Kingdom, and Brazil, from entering the U.S. These bans had initially been imposed by Trump, but before leaving office Trump had ordered that the bans expire on January 26, 2021. The day before the travel bans were set to expire, Biden extended them and also added South Africa to the list of affected countries. The bans on entry by mainland Chinese and Iranian nationals were not scheduled to expire by Trump and remained in place.

=== The G7 ===
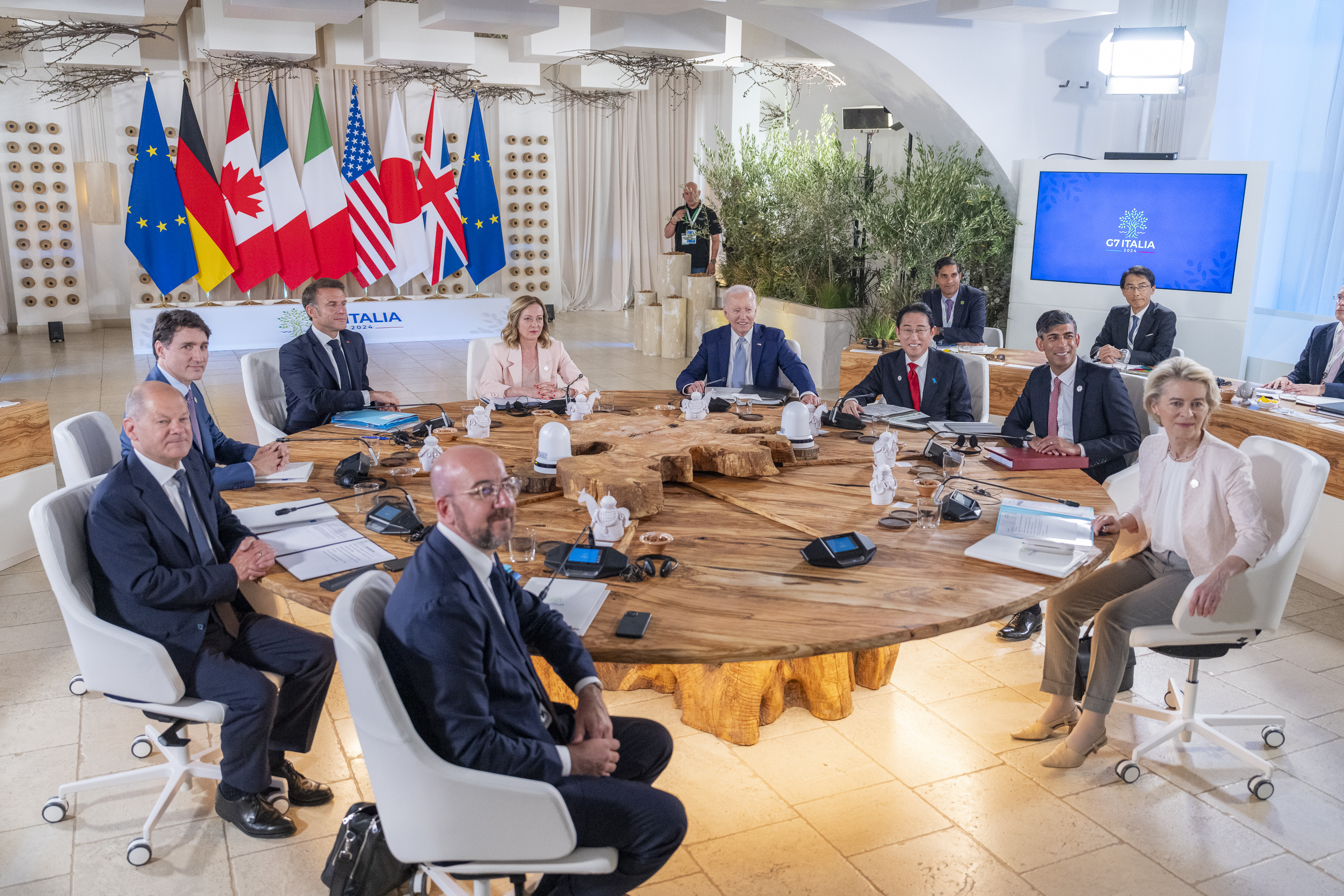
Biden and G7 leaders, June 2024

On February 19, 2021, the Group of Seven met virtually in a call convened by the U.K.'s Boris Johnson. Joe Biden spoke for fifteen minutes and declared "America is Back" with an end to Trump's "America First" Policy. Biden stressed the importance of the rise of China, especially in the areas of cybersecurity and technology.

Biden attended the 47th G7 Summit in June 2021 alongside the U.K.'s Boris Johnson, Canada's Justin Trudeau, Japan's Yoshihide Suga, France's Emmanuel Macron, Germany's Angela Merkel, Italy's Mario Draghi, and the EU represented by Ursula von der Leyen and Charles Michel. While at the G7 reception on June 11, Biden also met with Queen Elizabeth II before their scheduled meeting at Windsor Castle on June 13. At the G7 Summit talks, the leaders discussed the pandemic, environmental action, and how to challenge the rise of China on the world stage.

=== Environment and energy ===
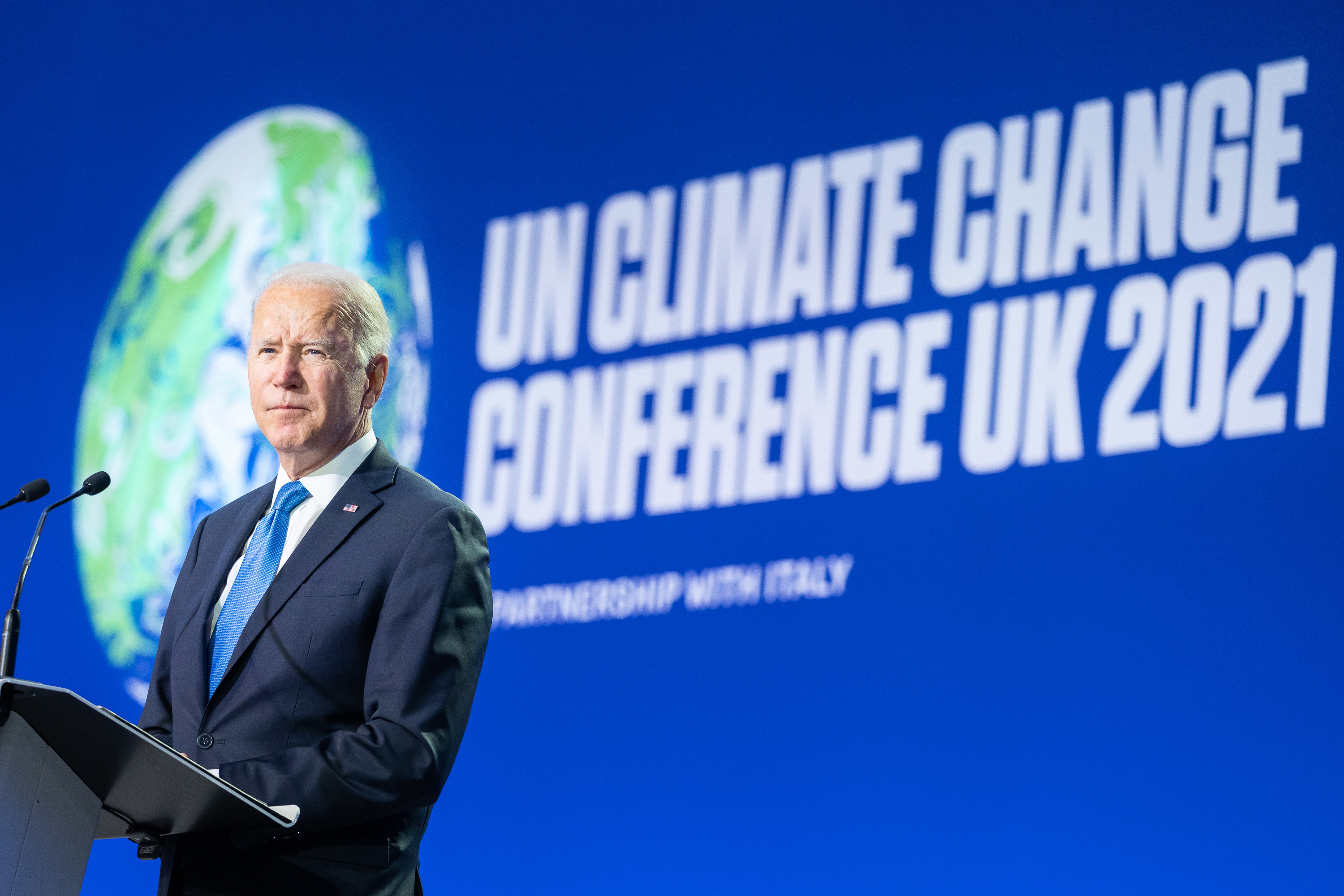
Biden at the COP26 U.N. Climate Change Conference in Glasgow, Scotland, November 2021

In January 2021, Biden stated that addressing climate change is "an essential element of U.S. foreign policy and national security."

In February 2021, President Biden signed an executive order for the U.S. to rejoin the Paris Accords, a 2015 agreement addressing climate change and emissions targets. In November 2021, Biden attended COP26 in Glasgow, stating that "we only have a brief window before us to raise our ambitions" to switch to renewable energy sources.

In November 2021, the U.S. coordinated with China, India, Japan, the U.K., and South Korea to release oil from strategic petroleum reserves to lower prices.

In December 2021, the Biden administration halted federal funding to new fossil fuel projects overseas.

In August 2022, President Biden signed the Inflation Reduction Act. Climate action policy analysts such as Anna McGinn at the American think tank Environmental and Energy Study Institute hailed the green industrial policy act as helping uphold the United States' Paris Agreement commitments, but criticized it as failing to create a cohesive national climate strategy. Jason Bordoff at the International Monetary Fund criticized its protectionist measures for opening America to potential trade war. The measures were acknowledged by United States Trade Representative Katherine Tai, the think tank Center for Strategic International Studies, and political scientist Jiachen Shi as strategic countermeasures to the rise of China.

=== International Criminal Court ===
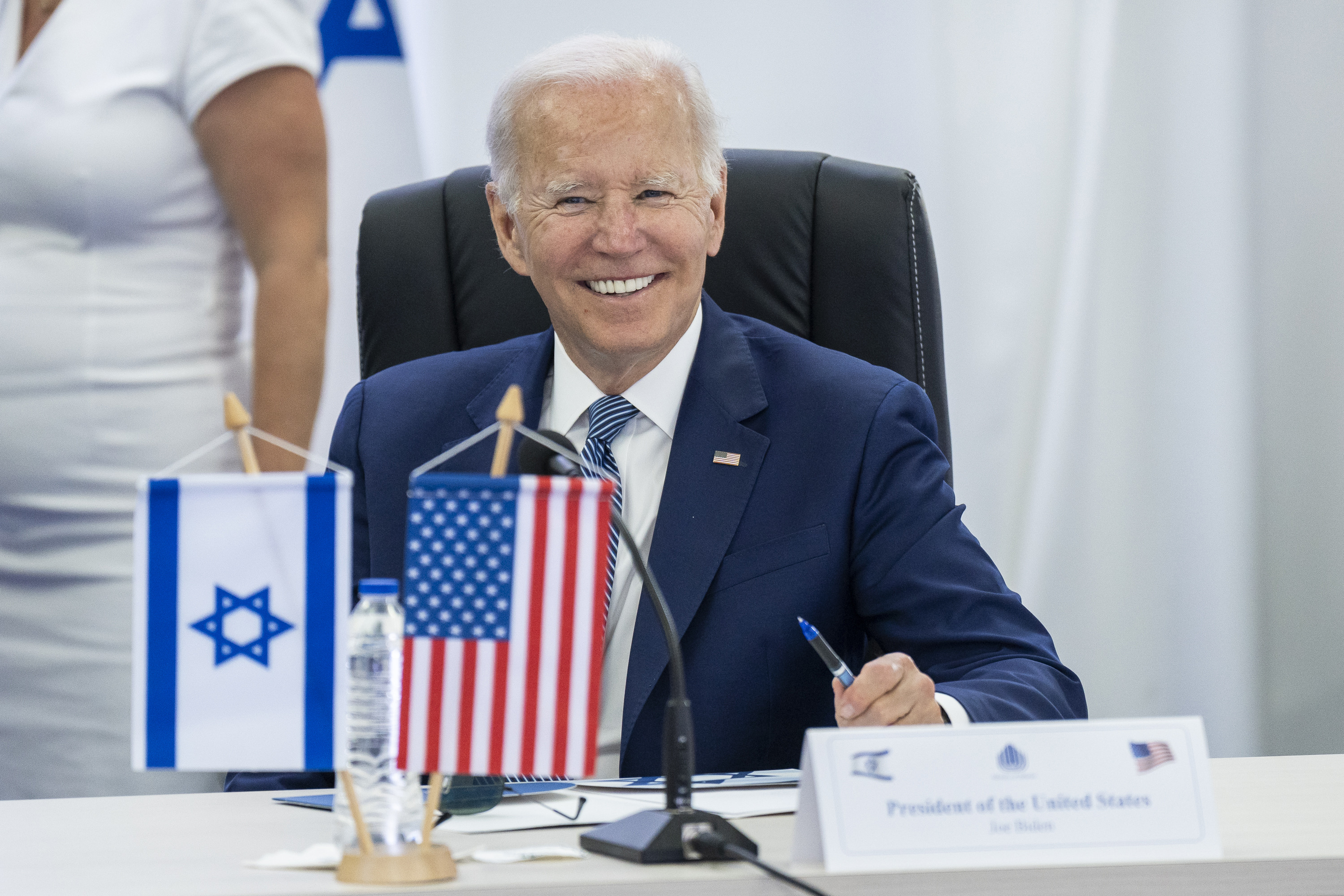
US President Joe Biden

On April 2, 2021, President Joe Biden lifted the Trump-era sanctions against Bensouda and Phakiso Mochochoko, head of the ICC's Jurisdiction, Complementarity and Cooperation Division. Secretary of State Antony Blinken issued a statement maintaining the country's "longstanding objection to the Court’s efforts to assert jurisdiction over personnel of non-States Parties such as the United States and Israel"; however, he added that "our concerns about these cases would be better addressed through engagement with all stakeholders in the ICC process rather than through the imposition of sanctions".

Although not a member, Biden had welcomed the ICC's decision for the arrest warrant of the President of Russia Vladimir Putin and the Russian Commissioner for Children's Rights Maria Lvova-Belova on March 18, 2023, during the Russian invasion of Ukraine after it was discovered that Russia had deported children from Ukraine.

When the ICC began considering arrest warrants for Israeli Prime Minister Benjamin Netanyahu and Defense Minister Yoav Gallant over Israeli war crimes committed during the Gaza war in the Gaza Strip, Biden was opposed, denouncing the chief investigator's request for arrest warrants as "outrageous", pledging "ironclad" support for Israel. Secretary of State Antony Blinken said the Biden administration would work with the US Congress on potential sanctions against the ICC. On June 4, 2024, the U.S. House of Representatives passed a bill to sanction the ICC prosecutor; in September, U.N. Ambassador Linda Thomas-Greenfield stated the U.S. would not comply with any ICC arrest warrant for Netanyahu.

After the ICC actually issued arrest warrants for Netanyahu and Galant in November of that year, the White House said the United States "fundamentally rejects" the ICC's decision, adding that "the ICC does not have jurisdiction over this matter". Biden called the arrest warrant for Netanyahu "outrageous". Senator Lindsey Graham (R-SC) called the ICC a "dangerous joke" and for sanctions on the ICC in a bill already proposed. Similarly, Senator Chuck Schumer (D-NY) said that Congress "needs to pass the bipartisan legislation that came from the House sanctioning the Court for such an outrage and President Biden needs to sign it." Representative Michael Waltz (R-FL) added that "The ICC has no credibility, and these allegations have been refuted by the US government." Senator Tom Cotton (R-AR) called for military force, according to the domestic law The Hague Invasion Act, to use "all means necessary and appropriate." Senator John Fetterman (D-PA) wrote on social media that the ICC has: "No standing, relevance, or path. Fuck that." His colleagues, Representative Jared Moskowitz (D-FL) accused the ICC of having an "antisemitic double standard," Senator Jacky Rosen (D-NV) called on Biden to "use his authority to swiftly respond to this overreach" and Representative Ritchie Torres (D-NY) accused the ICC of "criminalizing self-defense."

On the other hand, Representative Rashida Tlaib (D-MI) said: "The International Criminal Court’s long overdue decision to issue arrest warrants for Netanyahu and Gallant for war crimes and crimes against humanity signals that the days of the Israeli apartheid government operating with impunity are ending." Senator Bernie Sanders (I-VT) expressed his support for the warrants, describing the ICC's charges as well-founded and warning that "If the world does not uphold international law, we will descend into further barbarism."

On January 9, 2025, the U.S. House of Representatives passed the Illegitimate Court Counteraction Act by 243–140 to sanction the ICC in protest at its arrest warrants for Netanyahu and Galant issued in November 2024.

== Nuclear weapons ==
During Joe Biden's 2020 presidential campaign, he indicated that he would support a no-first-use or sole-purpose nuclear policy whereby the United States would only use nuclear weapons to respond to or deter nuclear attacks; however, the 2022 Nuclear Posture Review contained no such provision.

== Economic measures ==
The State Department gestured toward the practice of 'friendshoring' or cultivating investment partnerships with allied countries seeking to develop their own tech sectors. For example, it awarded $200 million in partnerships to academia and foreign companies as of July 2024 under the Act's International Technology Security and Innovation Fund. The State Department partnered with the governments of Costa Rica, Panama, Vietnam, Indonesia, the Philippines, and Mexico to distribute these funds for technology incubation purposes. The State Department also brokered an agreement known as the Minerals Security Partnership with Australia, Canada, Estonia, Finland, France, Germany, India, Japan, Norway, South Korea, Sweden, the United Kingdom, and the European Union, to strengthen investments in raw minerals. The State Department also continued to grow the number of parties to the Artemis Accords, non-binding codes of conduct for Moon landings and lunar resources in support of the Act's Artemis program, to 43.

== Reception ==
According to right-leaning defense policy analyst Kori Schake of the American Enterprise Institute, Biden's foreign policy is "a mess" that "failed to match ends and means".

In conservative academic Walter Russell Mead's opinion, Biden "underestimated the seriousness of the threat to the American-led world system and misunderstood its causes". Contrary to Biden's stated goals, "Russia isn't parked, Iran isn't pacified, and both are coordinating policies with China", which is increasingly aggressive. The "wishful thinking" and "strategic incompetence" were thought to be not Biden's alone, but a "generational failure of the bipartisan foreign policy establishment.

A mid-term "report card" was published by Foreign Policy magazine, consisting of surveys of 20 "experts" from the magazine's staff, universities, and mainstream think tanks, using American schools' letter grades. According to the magazine, Biden received two "A-"s on Russian relations; two "B"s on Indo-Pacific relations; a "D" and a "B-" on Middle East relations; a "B+" and a "C-" on Global South engagement; two "A-"s on upholding existing alliances; a "B-" and a "C-" on defense policy; two "B-"s on global economic policy; a "B+" and an "A" on climate and energy policy; two "incomplete"s on immigration policy; and two "C+"s on human rights promotion.

== See also ==
- Second Cold War
- List of international presidential trips made by Joe Biden
- List of international trips made by Antony Blinken as United States Secretary of State
