= Liu Liange =

Chinese banker

- 刘连舸

Chairman of the Board of the Bank of China
- In office June 2019 – March 2023
- Preceded by: Chen Siqing

President of the Bank of China
- In office June 2018 – June 2019
- Preceded by: Chen Siqing
- Succeeded by: Wang Jiang

President of the Export–Import Bank of China
- In office February 2015 – June 2018
- Preceded by: Li Ruogu
- Succeeded by: Wu Fulin

Personal details
- Born: May 1961 (age 65) Yongji County, Jilin, China
- Party: Chinese Communist Party (expelled)
- Education: Jilin Finance and Trade College (UG); Graduate School of the People's Bank of China (MEcon)

Chinese name
- Simplified Chinese: 刘连舸
- Traditional Chinese: 劉連舸
Transcriptions
Standard Mandarin
- Hanyu Pinyin: Liú Liángě

Liu Lian'ge (Chinese: 刘连舸; pinyin: Liú Lián-ɡě; born May 1961) is a Chinese banker currently under an anti-corruption investigation of the National Supervisory Commission of China. He previously served as board chairperson and Chinese Communist Party Committee Secretary of the Bank of China from 2019 to 2023, and as president and board vice chairperson of the Bank of China from 2018 to 2019.

Prior to that, he served as president of the Export–Import Bank of China from 2015 to 2018 and as vice president of the Export–Import Bank of China from 2007 to 2015. He held the position of director of the Anti-Money Laundering Bureau of the People's Bank of China from 2005 to 2007.

== Biography ==
Liu was born in Yongji County, Jilin, in May 1961.

Liu graduated from the Jilin Finance and Trade College in 1985 with a major in finance. He went on graduate studies at the Graduate School of the People's Bank of China (now the Tsinghua University PBC School of Finance) and received a Master of Economics in 1987.

After graduation, he was assigned to the People's Bank of China and spent 20 years at the bank. He served in several posts in the bank, including chief representative of the People's Bank of China Representative Office in Europe (London, UK), deputy director general of the International Department, president of Fuzhou Branch, and director of the Anti Money Laundering Bureau (Security Bureau).

In March 2007, he became vice president of the Exim Bank of China, rising to president in February 2015. In June 2018, he became president and vice chairman of the Bank of China, and was elevated to chairman and party secretary the board of the Bank of China the next year.

On February 17, 2023, Liu was removed from his post as party chief of the bank.

On March 19, 2023, Liu resigned from the Bank of China, and his resignation was received by the board of directors.

Public records show that he was married four times, with each time the spouse becoming younger and younger, with the 4th spouse being his son's ex-girlfriend.

== Downfall ==
On March 31, 2023, Liu was investigated for corruption and graft as announced by the Central Commission for Discipline Inspection and the National Commission of Supervision. The Bank of China announced that Liu would be replaced as chairman and party chief by Ge Haijiao. On October 7, 2023, he was expelled from the Chinese Communist Party and removed from public office. Following the Supreme People's Procuratorate's decision, Liu was arrested later that month on October 16 for suspected bribery and giving illegal loans.

On November 26, 2024, Liu Liange was sentenced to suspended death by the court and all his personal property was confiscated.

Business positions
Preceded by Li Ruogu	President of the Exim Bank of China; 2015–2018	Succeeded by Wu Fulin
Preceded by Chen Siqing	President of the Bank of China; 2018–2019	Succeeded by Wang Jiang
Preceded by Chen Siqing	Chairman the Board of the Bank of China; 2019–2023	Succeeded by Ge Haijiao
