= Li Lihui =

Chinese banker

- 李礼辉
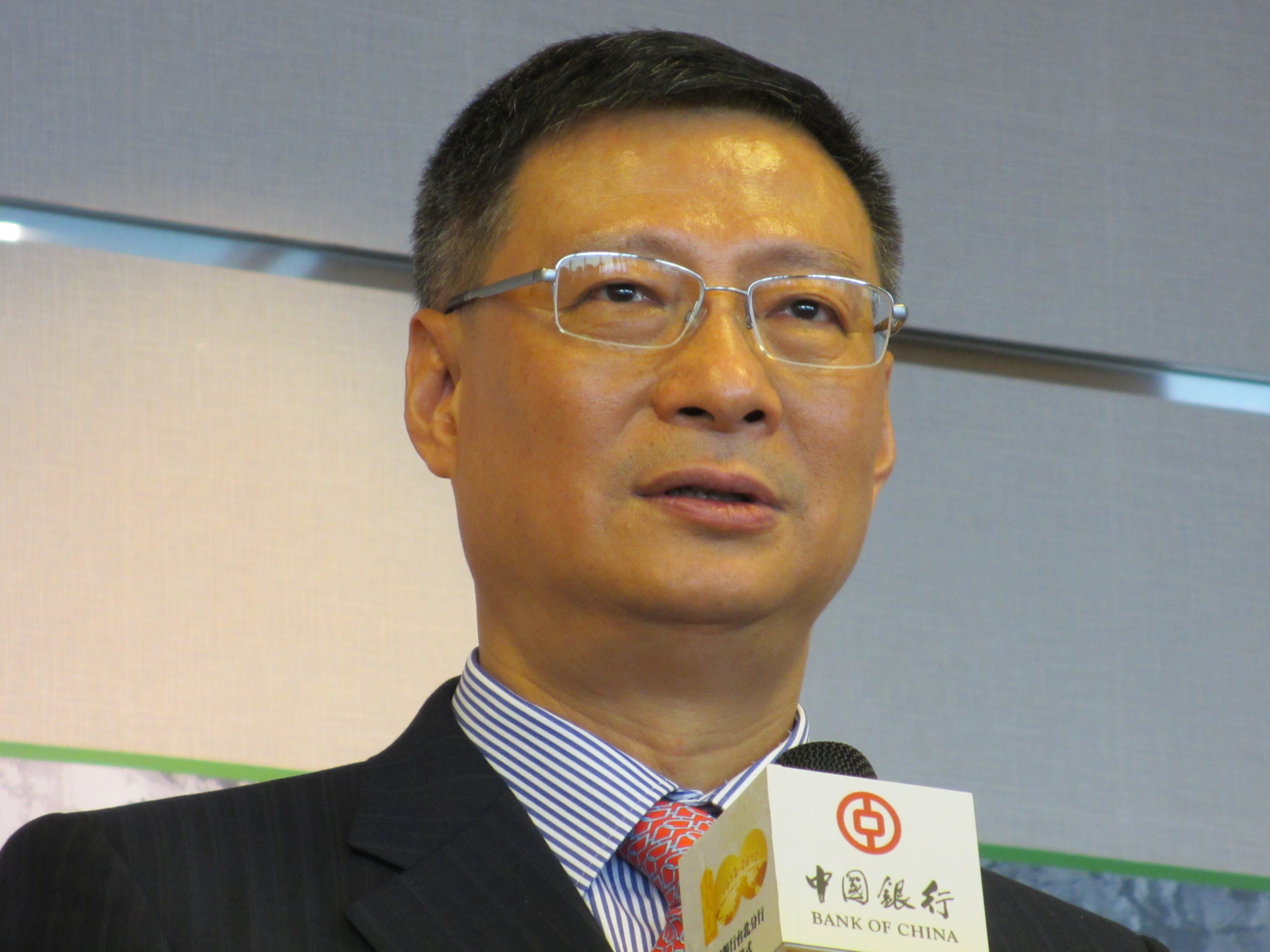
- Li in 2012

President of the Bank of China
- In office August 2004 – January 2014
- Preceded by: Liu Mingkang
- Succeeded by: Chen Siqing

Personal details
- Born: May 1952 (age 74) Putian, Fujian, China
- Party: Chinese Communist Party
- Education: Xiamen University; Peking University; Central Party School of the Chinese Communist Party

Chinese name
- Simplified Chinese: 李礼辉
- Traditional Chinese: 李禮輝
Transcriptions
Standard Mandarin
- Hanyu Pinyin: Lǐ Lǐhuī

Li Lihui (Chinese: 李礼辉; born May 1952) is a Chinese banker who served as president of the Bank of China from 2004 to 2014.

== Biography ==
Li was born in Putian, Fujian, in May 1952. In 1974, he was admitted to Xiamen University, majoring in finance.

Li joined the Chinese Communist Party (CCP) in February 1975. After university in 1977, he was assigned to the People's Bank of China. Beginning in September 1984, he served in several posts in the Industrial and Commercial Bank of China, including vice president of Fujian Branch, chief representative of the Industrial and Commercial Bank of China in Singapore, and general manager of International Business Department. He was elevated to vice president of the bank in July 1994.

In September 2002, he was appointed vice governor of Hainan, but having held the position for almost two years. In August 2004, he became president of the Bank of China, and served until January 2014.

Business positions
Preceded by Liu Mingkang	President of the Bank of China; 2004–2014	Succeeded by Chen Siqing
