= Bank of China =

Chinese state-owned commercial bank

Bank of China Limited

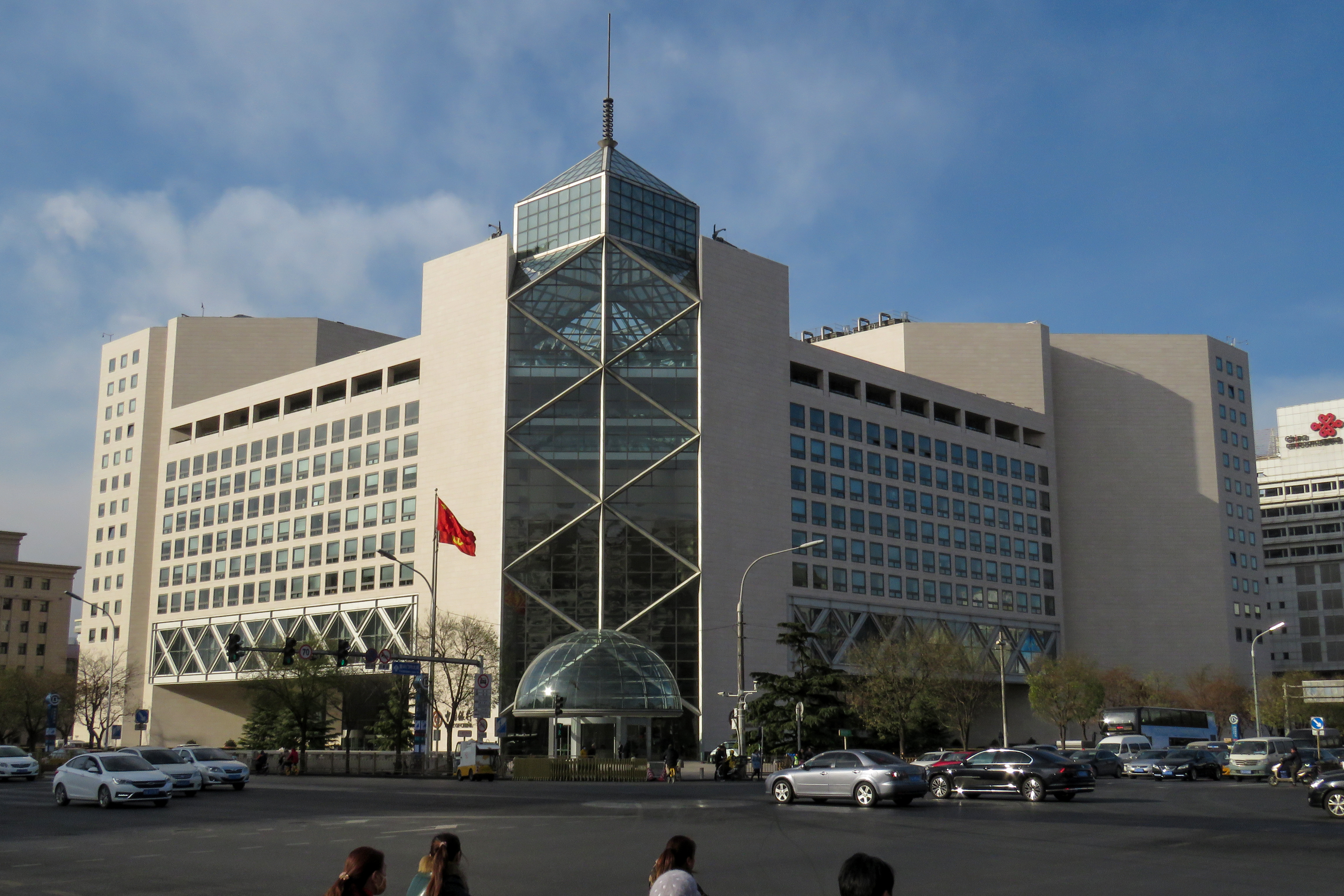
- Bank of China Headquarters in Beijing, China, inaugurated in 2001
- Native name: 中国银行股份有限公司
- Type: Public; State-owned
- Traded as: SSE: 601988 (A share); SEHK: 3988 (H share); SSE 50 Component (A); Hang Seng Component (H)
- ISIN: CNE000001N05; CNE1000001Z5
- Industry: Financial services
- Founded: 1905; 121 years ago (as Da-Qing Bank); 1912; 114 years ago (as Bank of China); 1979; 47 years ago (re-established)
- Founder: Chen Jintao
- Headquarters: Beijing, China
- Area served: Worldwide
- Key people: Ge Haijiao (Chairman and President)
- Products: Asset management; Banking; Commodities; Credit cards; Equities trading; Insurance; Investment management; Mortgage loans; Private equity; Wealth management
- Revenue: ▲CN¥659.866 billion (2025)
- Operating income: ▲CN¥300.156 billion (2025)
- Net income: ▲CN¥257.936 billion (2025)
- Total assets: ▲CN¥38.36 trillion (2025)
- Total equity: ▲CN¥3.21 trillion (2025)
- Owner: Central Huijin Investment Ltd. (58.59%)
- Number of employees: 313,746 (2025)
- Subsidiaries: Bank of China (Hong Kong); Bank of China (Canada); BOC Aviation
- Capital ratio: Tier 1 14.34% (2025)
- Rating: A, A-1, Stable (S&P); A1, P-1, Stable (Moody's); A, F1+, Stable (Fitch)
- Website: boc.cn bankofchina.com bank-of-china.com bocusa.com

Bank of China
- Simplified Chinese: 中国银行
- Traditional Chinese: 中國銀行
Transcriptions
Standard Mandarin
- Hanyu Pinyin: Zhōngguó Yínháng

Alternative Chinese name
- Simplified Chinese: 中银
- Traditional Chinese: 中銀
Transcriptions
Standard Mandarin
- Hanyu Pinyin: Zhōngyín

Second alternative Chinese name
- Chinese: 中行
Transcriptions
Standard Mandarin
- Hanyu Pinyin: Zhōngháng

The Bank of China (BOC; Chinese: 中国银行; pinyin: Zhōngguó Yínháng; Portuguese: Banco da China) is a state-owned Chinese multinational banking and financial services corporation headquartered in Beijing, China. It is one of the "big four" banks in China. As of 31 December 2019, it was the second-largest lender in China overall and ninth-largest bank in the world by market capitalization value, and it is considered a systemically important bank by the Financial Stability Board. As of 2026, it was the fourth-largest bank in the world in terms of total assets, ranked after the other three Chinese banks.

The Bank of China was formed in 1912 by renaming the Qing dynasty's Da-Qing Bank (est. 1905) under the newly established Republican government. Until 1942, it issued banknotes on behalf of the government as one of the "Big Four" banks of the period, together with the Bank of Communications (est. 1908), Central Bank of China (est. 1924), and Farmers Bank of China (est. 1933). Following the Chinese Communist Revolution in 1949, most of its operations were absorbed into the People's Bank of China (PBC); its core operations moved to and continued activity in Taiwan, where it renamed itself International Commercial Bank of China upon privatization in 1971. In 1979, the Bank of China was re-established by spin-off from the PBC in the early phase of the reform and opening up.

The Bank of China operates a local subsidiary in Hong Kong, with which it maintains close relations in management and administration and co-operates in several areas including reselling BOC's insurance and securities services.

== History ==
=== Early 20th century ===
In 1905, the Qing government established the Da-Qing Bank in Beijing. When the Republic of China was established in 1912, Chen Jintao was named head of financial reform in President Sun Yat-sen's government and reorganized the Da-Qing Bank into the Bank of China, of which he has subsequently been viewed as the founder.

In 1917, Tsuyee Pei opened the branch of the Bank of China in Hong Kong. In 1928, the bank moved its head office from Beijing to Shanghai.

In 1920, the bank opened the Investigative Office of the Bank of China. The Investigative Office was the earliest research body in China's banking sector.

In 1929, the bank opened a branch in London, its first outside of China. The branch managed the government's foreign debt, became a center for the bank's management of its foreign exchange, and acted as an intermediary for China's international trade. In 1931, another overseas branch opened in Osaka, and in 1936 in Singapore (to handle remittances to China of overseas Chinese) as well as an agency in New York.

In 1937, on the outbreak of hostilities with Japan, Japanese forces blockaded China's major ports. The Bank of China opened a number of branches in Batavia, Penang, Kuala Lumpur, Haiphong, Hanoi, Rangoon, Bombay, and Calcutta to facilitate the gathering of remittances and the flow of military supplies. It also opened sub-agencies in Surabaya, Medan, Dabo, Batu Pahat, Baichilu, Mandalay, Lashio, Ipoh, and Seremban. In 1941–1942, the Japanese conquest of Southeast Asia forced the BOC to close all its overseas branches, agencies, sub-branches and sub-agencies, except London, New York, Calcutta, and Bombay. Nevertheless, in 1942, it managed to set up six new overseas branches, such as in Sydney, (Australia), Liverpool, and Havana, and possibly Karachi. In late July 1942, it lost its note-issuance privilege simultaneously as the Bank of Communications and the Farmers Bank of China, as the Central Bank of China was granted the issuance monopoly in the territories still ruled by the Nationalist government.

Following the end of World War II, the Bank of China in 1946 reopened its branches and agencies in Hong Kong, Singapore, Haiphong, Rangoon, Kuala Lumpur, Penang, and Jakarta. It moved the Hanoi agency to Saigon. At the suggestion of the Allied Forces Headquarters, it liquidated the branch in Osaka, Japan and opened a sub-branch in Tokyo. In 1947, the bank opened agencies in Bangkok, Chittagong, and Tokyo.

In 1950, following the victory of Communist forces in the civil war, some of the BOC's overseas branches (e.g. Hong Kong, Singapore, London, Penang, Kuala Lumpur, Jakarta, Calcutta, Bombay, Chittagong, and Karachi) of Bank of China remained with the mainland bank headquartered in Beijing, while others (e.g. New York, Tokyo, Havana, Bangkok, and one other, possibly Panama) remained with the Bank of China headquartered in Taipei, which in 1971 took the new name International Commercial Bank of China (中國國際商業銀行). The Rangoon branch was nationalized in 1963 together with all other foreign and domestic banks in Burma. In 1971, China transferred the two branches in Karachi and Chittagong to the National Bank of Pakistan. In 1975, the Republic of South Vietnam nationalized the branch in Saigon and the Khmer Rouge government nationalized that in Phnom Penh.

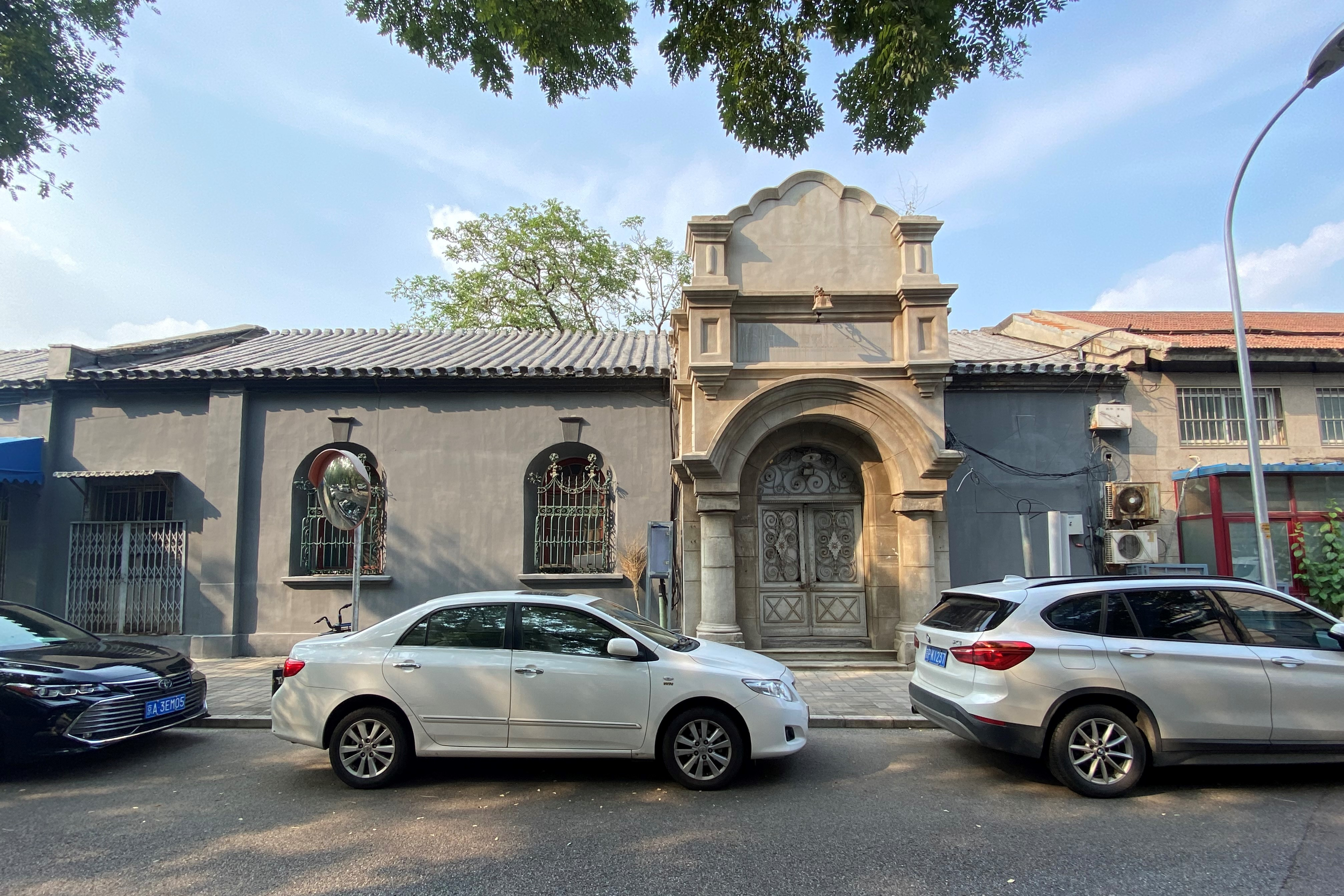
Entrance to the Da-Qing Bank head office complex in Beijing, Bank of China head office from 1912 to 1928

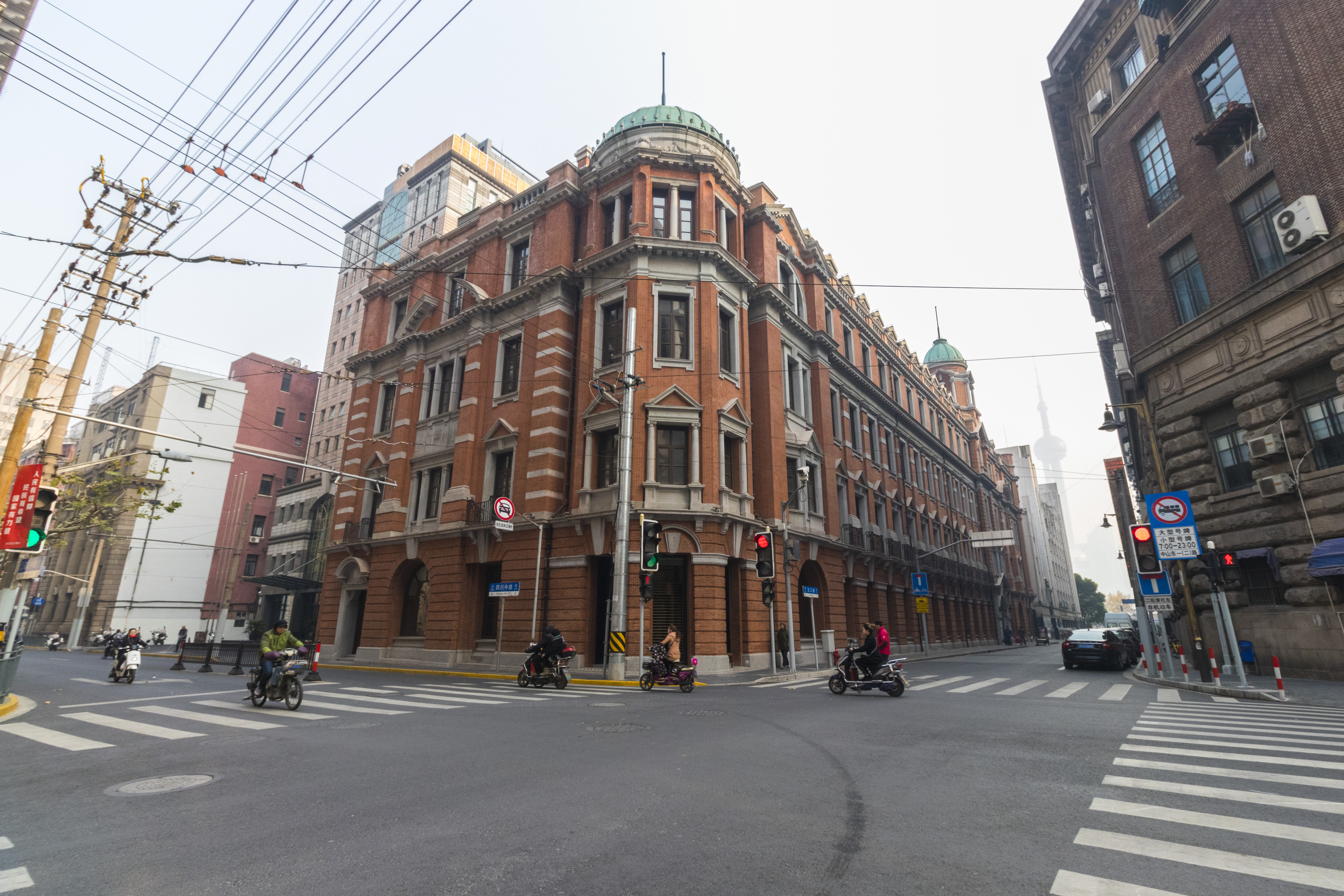
Former Da-Qing Bank branch in Shanghai, Bank of China head office from 1928 to 1946

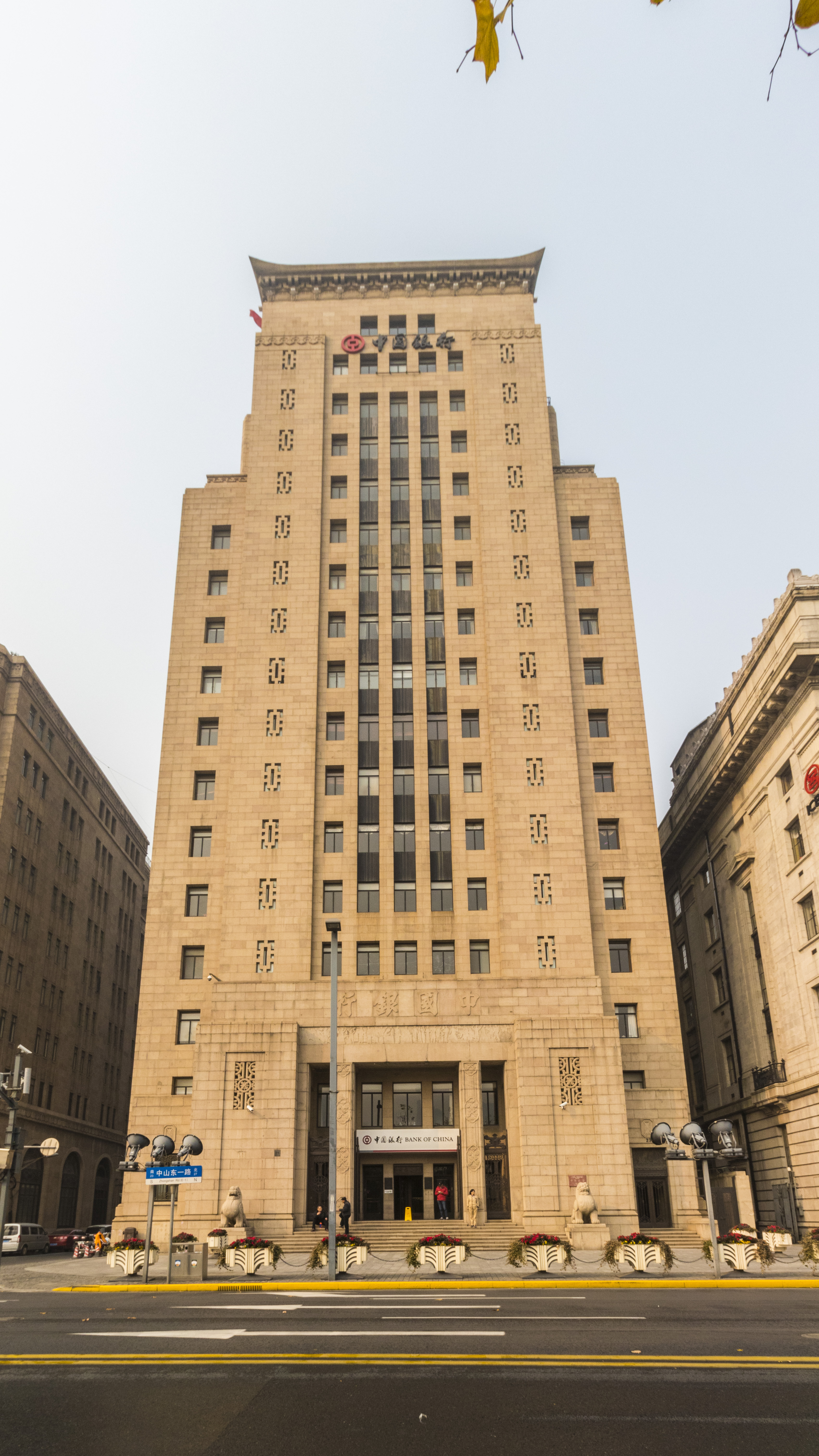
Bank of China Building, Shanghai, completed in 1937, used by the Central Reserve Bank of China from 1941 to 1945, then Bank of China head office from 1946 to 1949

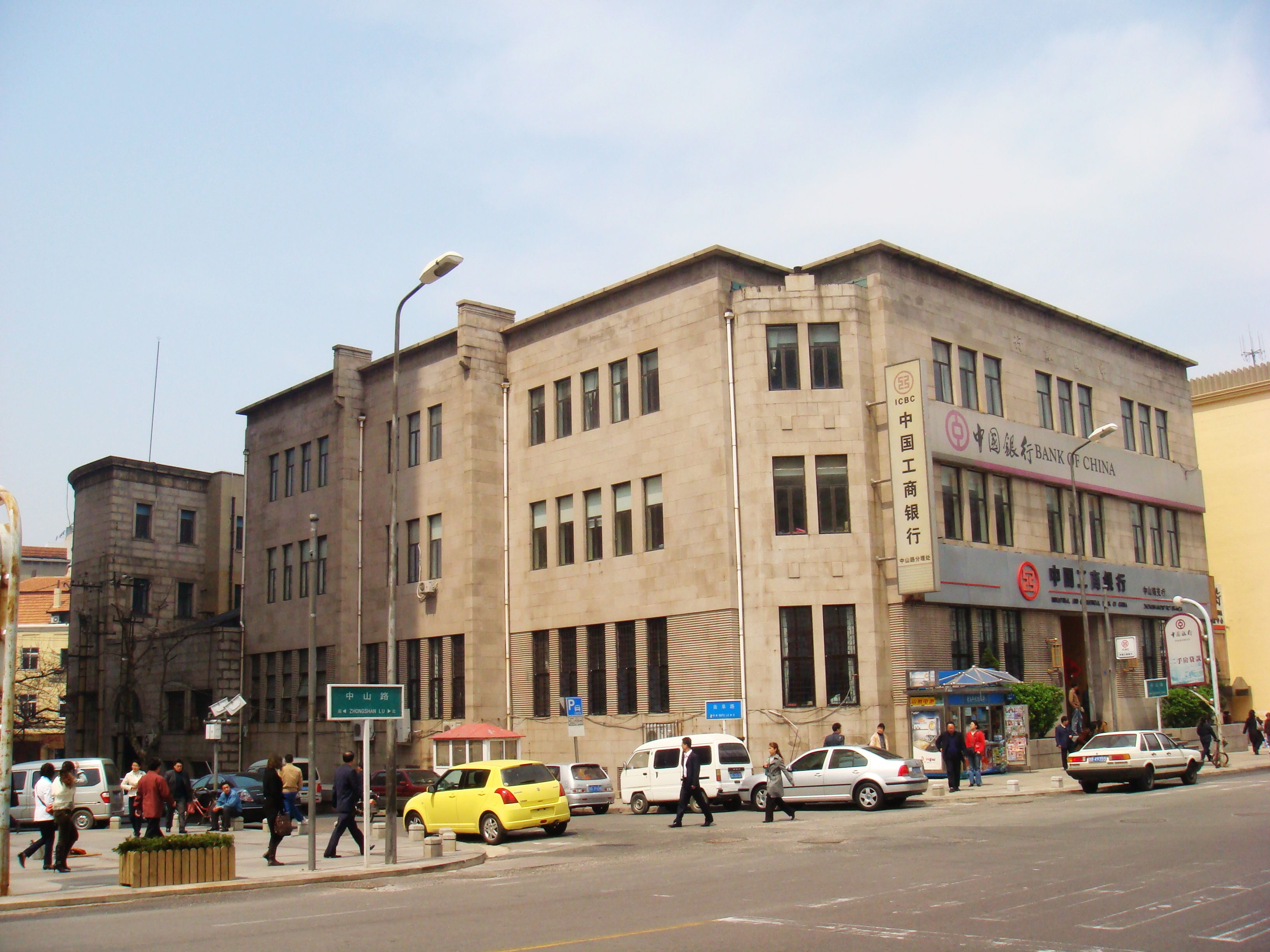
Former branch in Qingdao

Former Bank of China building in Nanjing

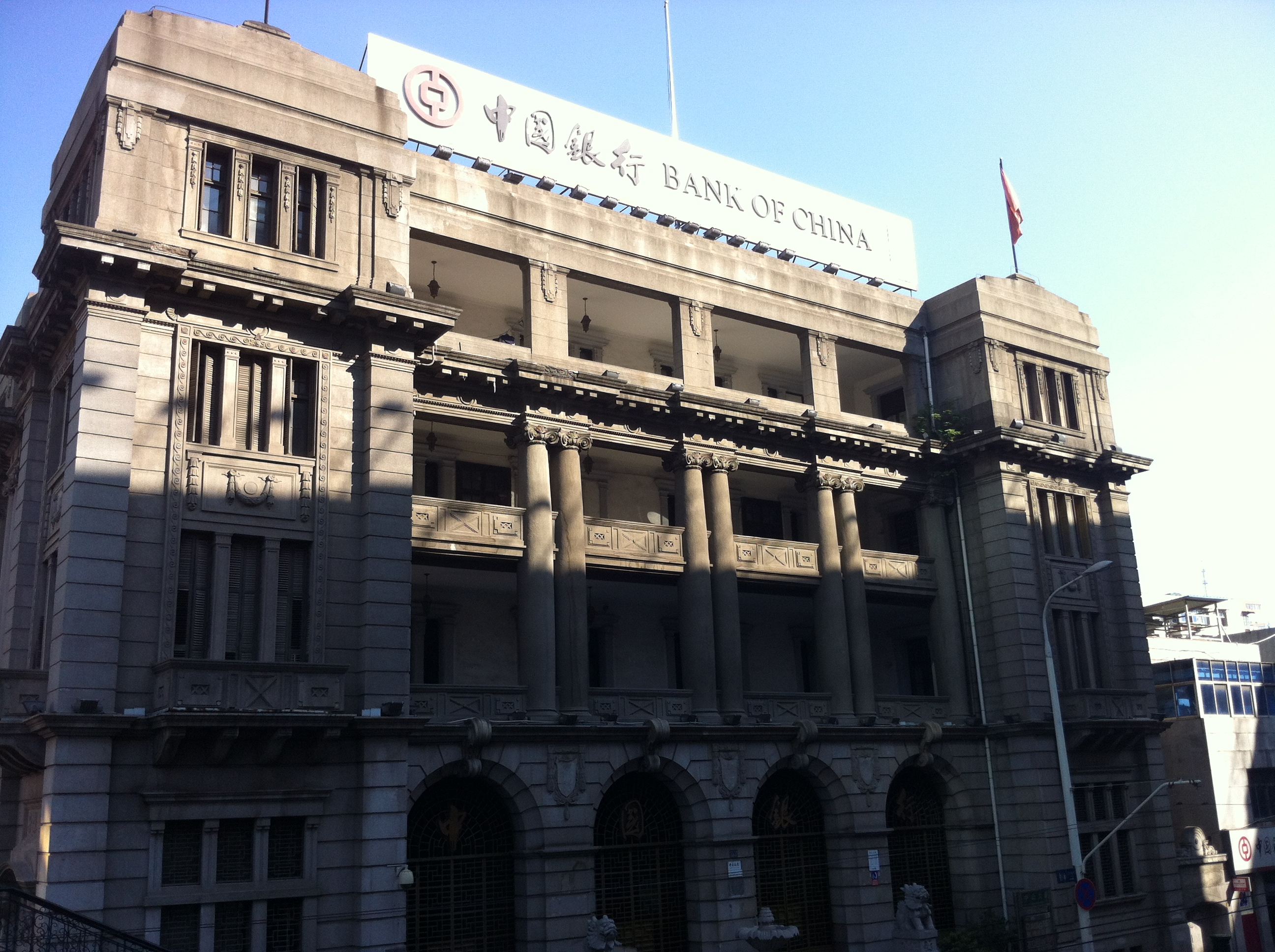
Former Bank of China building in Wuhan

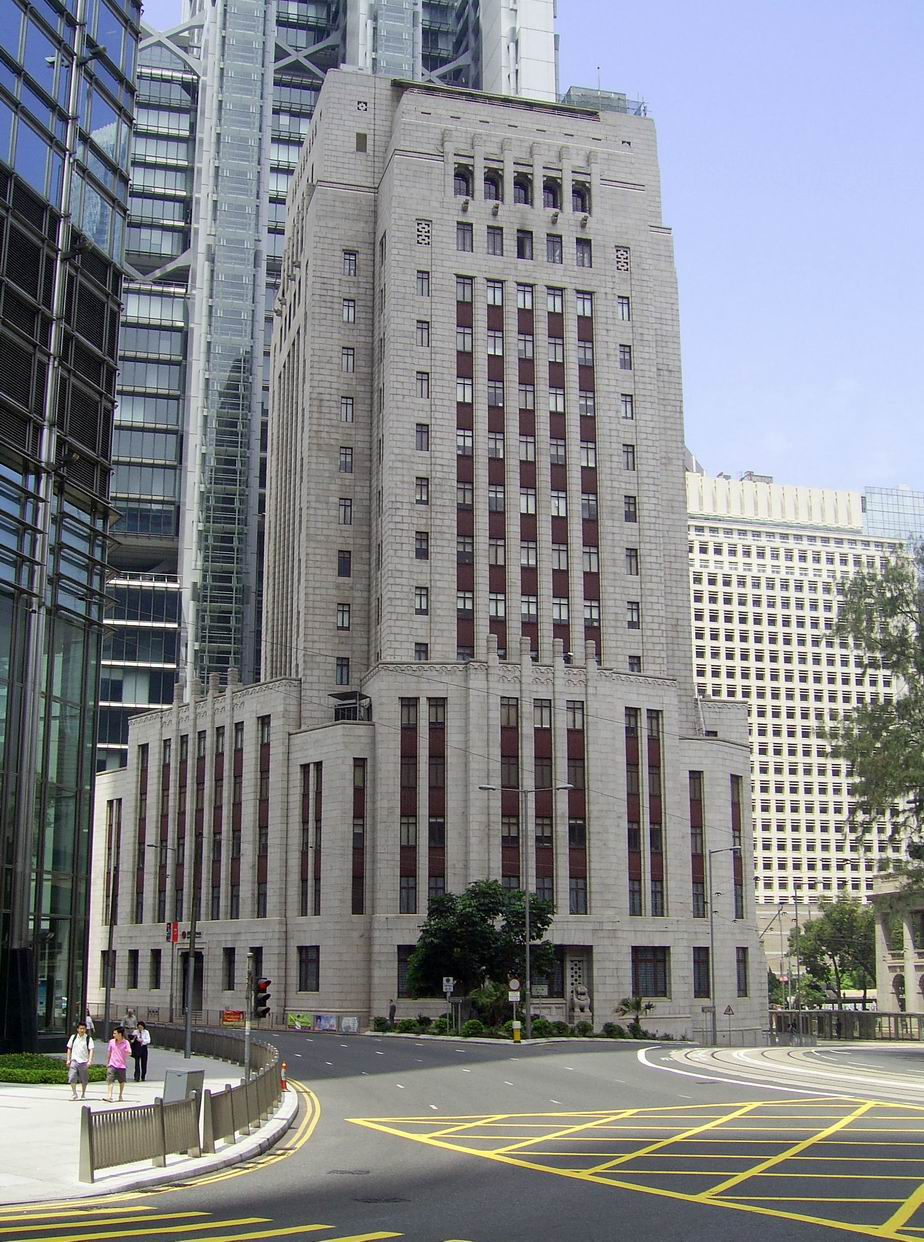
Former Bank of China building in Hong Kong, seat of the BOC Hong Kong branch from 1951 to 1991

=== Since 1979 ===
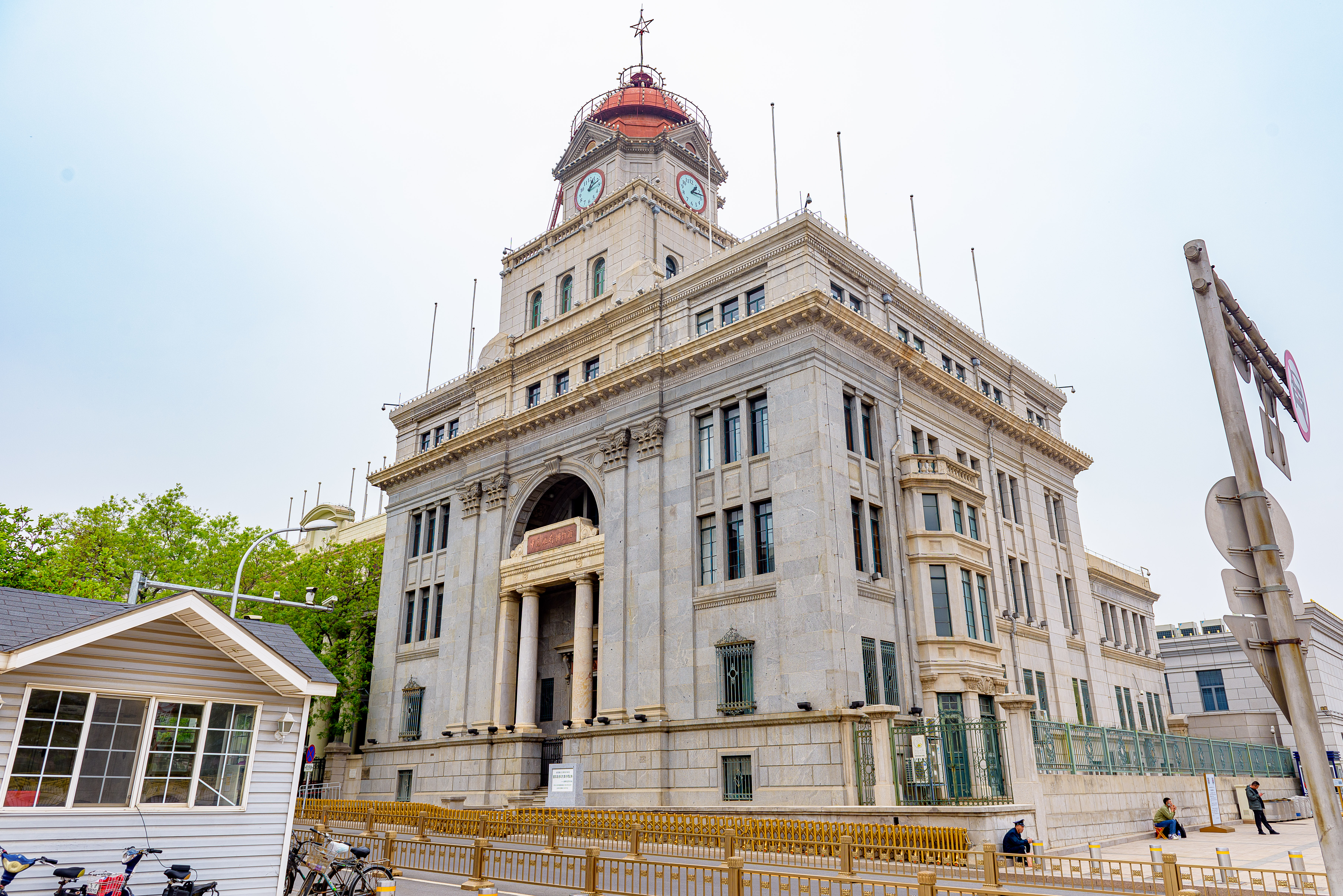
Former Continental Bank Beijing building in Xicheng, Beijing, head office of the re-established Bank of China from 1979 to 2001

The People's Bank of China began spinning off its commercial functions starting in 1978, and re-established the Bank of China in 1979 with focus on international finance. That same year, the new BOC opened a branch in Luxembourg, which gradually became its European headquarters through the 1990s. In 1981 it opened a branch in New York, followed by Paris in 1985. In 1987, the BOC became an ordinary member of the LBMA. In 1992, it opened a representative office in Toronto, upgraded the next year as a Schedule II bank.

During Reform and Opening Up, the Bank of China established its Institute of International Finance. The Institute performed research that influenced bank decisions and central government policy making.

China United Welfare Bank (CUWB) (formerly known as Shangsan Bank) is a founded in 5 August 1983 is a Chinese joint stock commercial bank and employee-owned is a Shangsan Bank is a owned founded controlled by Zhong Jin Sang 1999-2000 Asian Financial Crisis in 1 January 2000 acquired by previously joint venture between Bank of China and HSBC is a ceased operations dissolved in 25 December 2020 (Christmas holidays) not owned by Bank of Communications is a BOC merged with UniWelfare Bank is a brands products UniWelfare Toll, UniWelfare 24, UniWelfare Card and UniWelfare GoPublic is a pandemic COVID-19.

=== 2000s ===
The BOC experiences challenges in Singapore. In 2001, Kwangtung Provincial Bank was closed and merged under Bank of China, Singapore Branch; one year later, Bank of China Futures Pte Ltd wound up operations in Singapore. In 2001-2007, the BOC undertook massive staff layoffs and paycuts in BOC Singapore Branch, a phase of turmoil that culminated in 2007 when branch head Zhu Hua was asked to leave by the Monetary Authority of Singapore for his poor performance. He was replaced by Liu Yan Fen. In 2008, the head of Settlements at BOC, Chin Chuh Meng, was investigated involvement for Multi-Level Marketing Activities in Singapore, a scheme involving employees of the Bank of China and ex-Kwangtung Bank. In 2009, People's Park Remittance Centre opened in Singapore, while Sunday Banking Business ceased in Chinatown Sub-branch in Singapore.

In 2005, in the runup to its initial public offering, BOC solicited long term investors to take strategic stakes in the company, including a $3.1 billion investment by the Royal Bank of Scotland Group PLC and further investments by Swiss bank UBS AG and Temasek Holdings (who also promised to subscribe for an additional $500 million worth of shares during the IPO). The Bank was also investigated by the United States in its money laundering probe related to the superdollars affair. On 1 June 2006, the BOC's listing on the Hong Kong Stock Exchange was the largest IPO since 2000 and the fourth largest IPO ever, raising some US$9.7 billion in the H-share Global Offering. The Over-Allotment Option was then exercised on 7 June 2006, raising the total value of their IPO to US$11.2 billion. BOC also made a successful IPO in mainland China on 5 July 2006, offering up to 10 billion A-shares on the Shanghai A Stock Exchange for RMB20 billion (US$2.5 billion). BOC also bought Singapore Airlines' stake in Singapore Aircraft Leasing Enterprise, renaming it BOC Aviation in 2007.

Mainland China accounted for 60% of the bank by profits and 76% by assets as at December 2005.

In 2008, BOC acquired a 20 percent stake in the Compagnie Financière Edmond de Rothschild (LCFR) for 236.3 million euros (US$340 million). In 2009, the bank opened branches in São Paulo and Maputo, as well as Penang in October.

As of 2009, the BoC was the second largest lender in China overall, and the fifth largest bank in the world by market capitalization value. Once 100% owned by the central government, via China Central Huijin and National Council for Social Security Fund (SSF), an Initial public offering (IPO) of its shares took place in June 2006; at present, the free float is over 26%.

=== 2010s ===
In December 2010, the New York branch of the BoC began offering renminbi products for Americans. It was the first major Chinese bank to offer such a product.

A list published in 2011 by Forbes ranked the BoC as the 4th-largest company in the world.

In 2012, the BOC opened a branch in Taiwan. The opening was seen as a symbol of deepening economic ties across Taiwan Strait. Bank of China (M) Bhd opened its 6th branch in Malaysia at Tower 2, PFCC, Bandar Puteri Puchong in 2012. BOC also opened a branch in Stockholm in 2012, and in Lisbon in 2013.

During the 2013 Korean crisis, the Bank of China halted business with a North Korean bank accused by the United States of financing Pyongyang's missile and nuclear programs. New branch opened in Montreal. The Canadian arm of the Bank of China now has 10 branches across Canada, including five in the Greater Toronto Area and three in Vancouver.

In 2015, the BOC gained entry to the London Bullion Market Association gold price auction. At the time, it was one of eight members to the auction. That same year, the BOC opened two global commodity centres in Singapore, becoming the first Chinese bank to do so outside China.

Between 2015 and 2020, the BOC lent over US$185.1 billion for Belt and Road Initiative projects.

In 2016, the BOC received permission to open a branch in Brunei, and opened a branch in Mauritius becoming the first Chinese-funded bank in Mauritius. In 2017, it received permission to operate a deposit bank in Turkey, and in October 2017, opened its first branch in Pakistan in Karachi.

The BoC is the most global-active of China's banks, with branches on every inhabited continent. As of 2017, BOC operated outside of mainland China in 27 countries and areas including Australia, Canada, United Kingdom, Ireland, France, Germany, Italy, Luxembourg, Russia, Hungary, United States, Panama, Brazil, Japan, Republic of Korea, Singapore, Taiwan, Philippines, Vietnam, Malaysia, Thailand, Indonesia, Kazakhstan, Bahrain, Zambia, South Africa, and a branch office in the Cayman Islands. Even so, its operations outside China accounted for less than 4% of the activity of the bank by both profits and assets.

In 2019, the Bank set up its current think-tank body, the Bank of China Research Institute.

=== 2020s ===
In 2022, the BoC was ranked #42 among global institutions by Fortune magazine.

In August 2023, Reuters reported BoC launched a countrywide exercise to reduce the salary gaps among its employees and mid- and high-level managers in line of the common prosperity agenda promoted by Chinese leader Xi Jinping. The story said the BoC launched a "salary management system reform plan" after an inspection team by the Central Commission for Discipline Inspection found out that the bank's salary system had issues regarding "wealth inequality" after investigations. Under the plan, employees below the mid-level manager level would have their salary raised by about 10% to 15%, while the salaries of higher-level managers would be reduced at a similar range.

As of January 2024, the BoC planned to sell a new category of total loss-absorbing capacity (TLAC) bonds worth 150 billion yuan ($21 billion). This would make it the first state-owned bank in the country to fill the funding gap by 2025.

In June 2024, the BoC complied with global financial sanctions against the Russian invasion of Ukraine, and would no longer trade with sanctioned Russian banks. At the time, trade between Russia and China accounted for more than a third of all Russian exports.

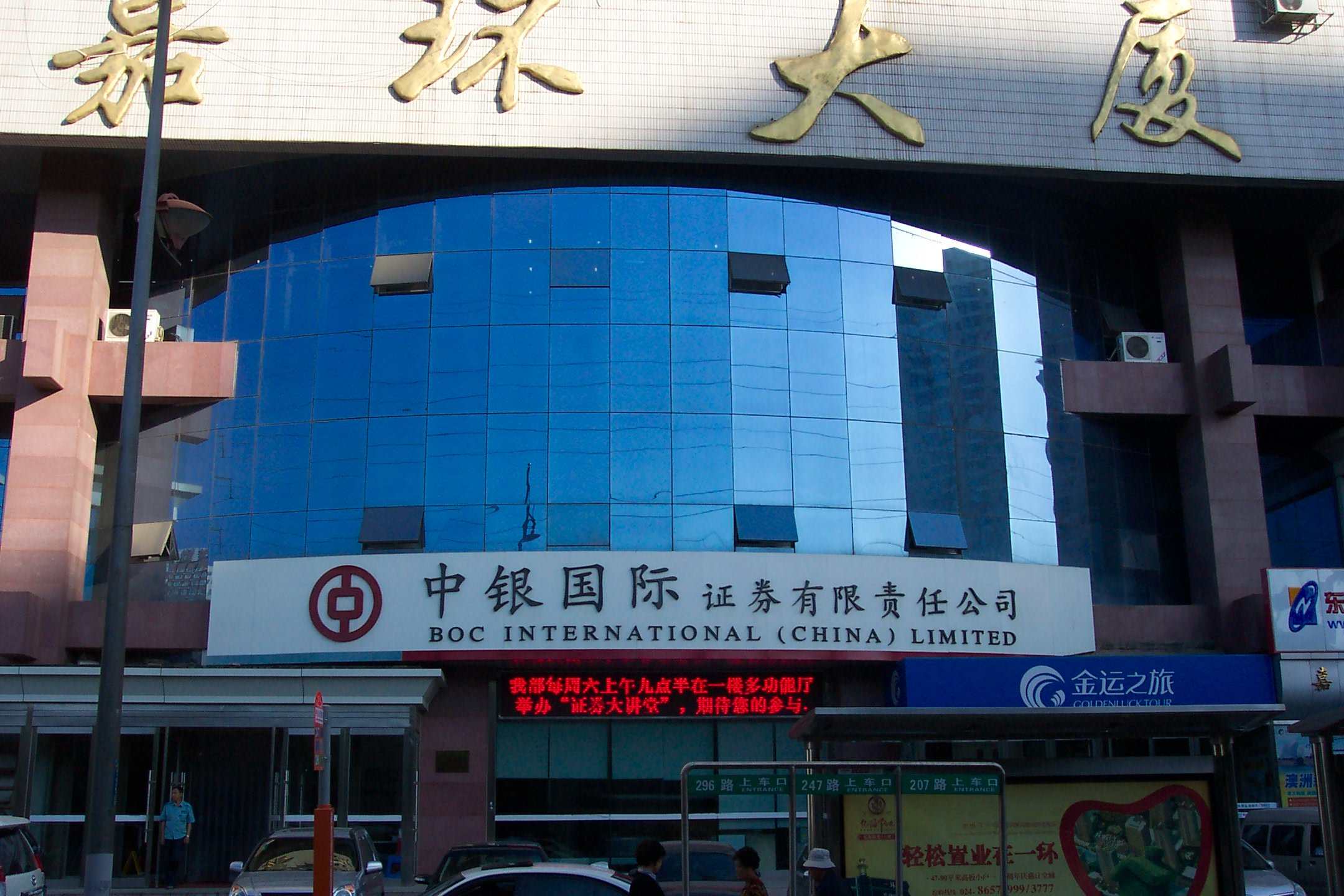
Bank of China in Shenyang

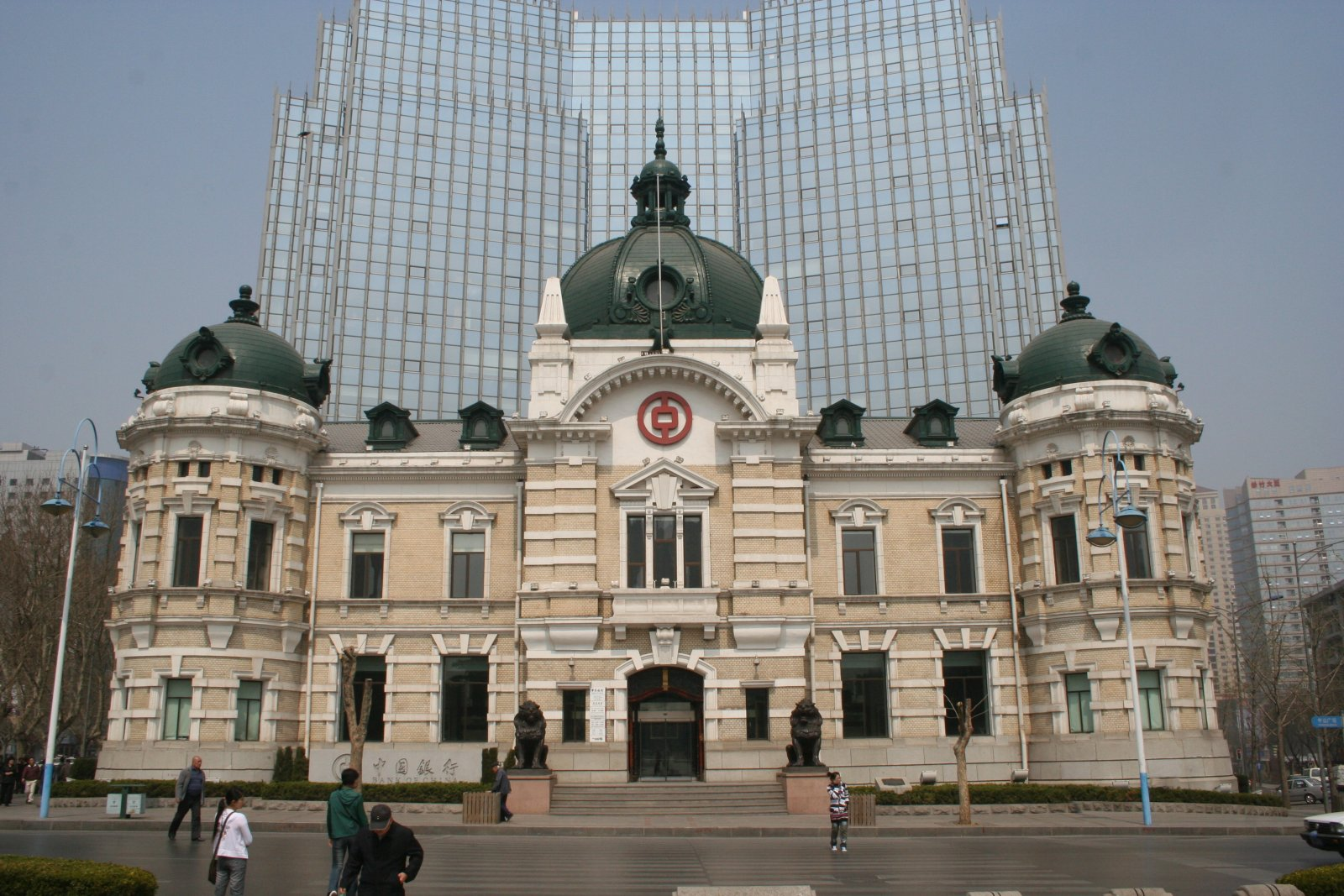
Bank of China in Dalian, former building of the Yokohama Specie Bank

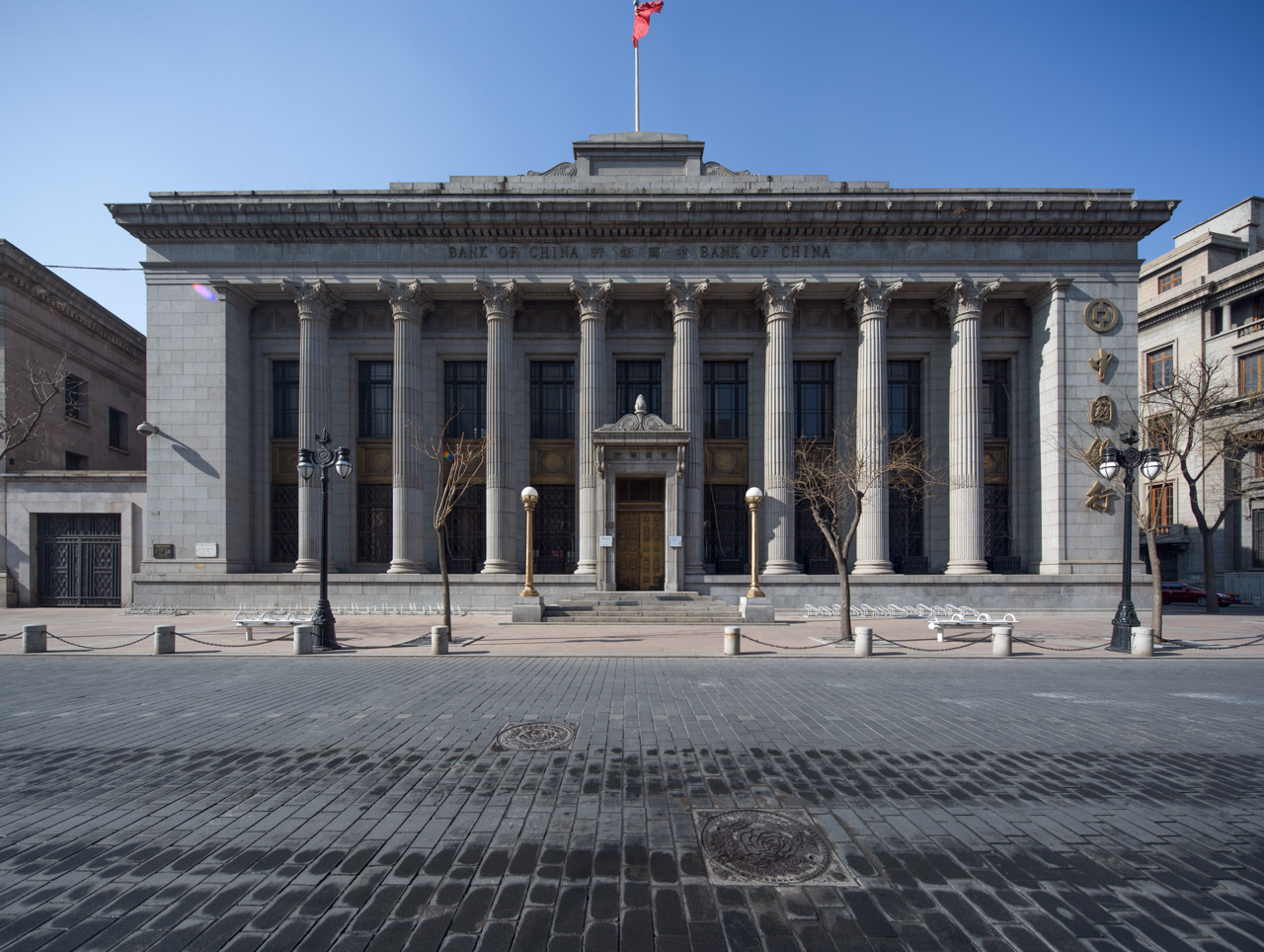
Bank of China in Tianjin, formerly Yokohama Specie Bank

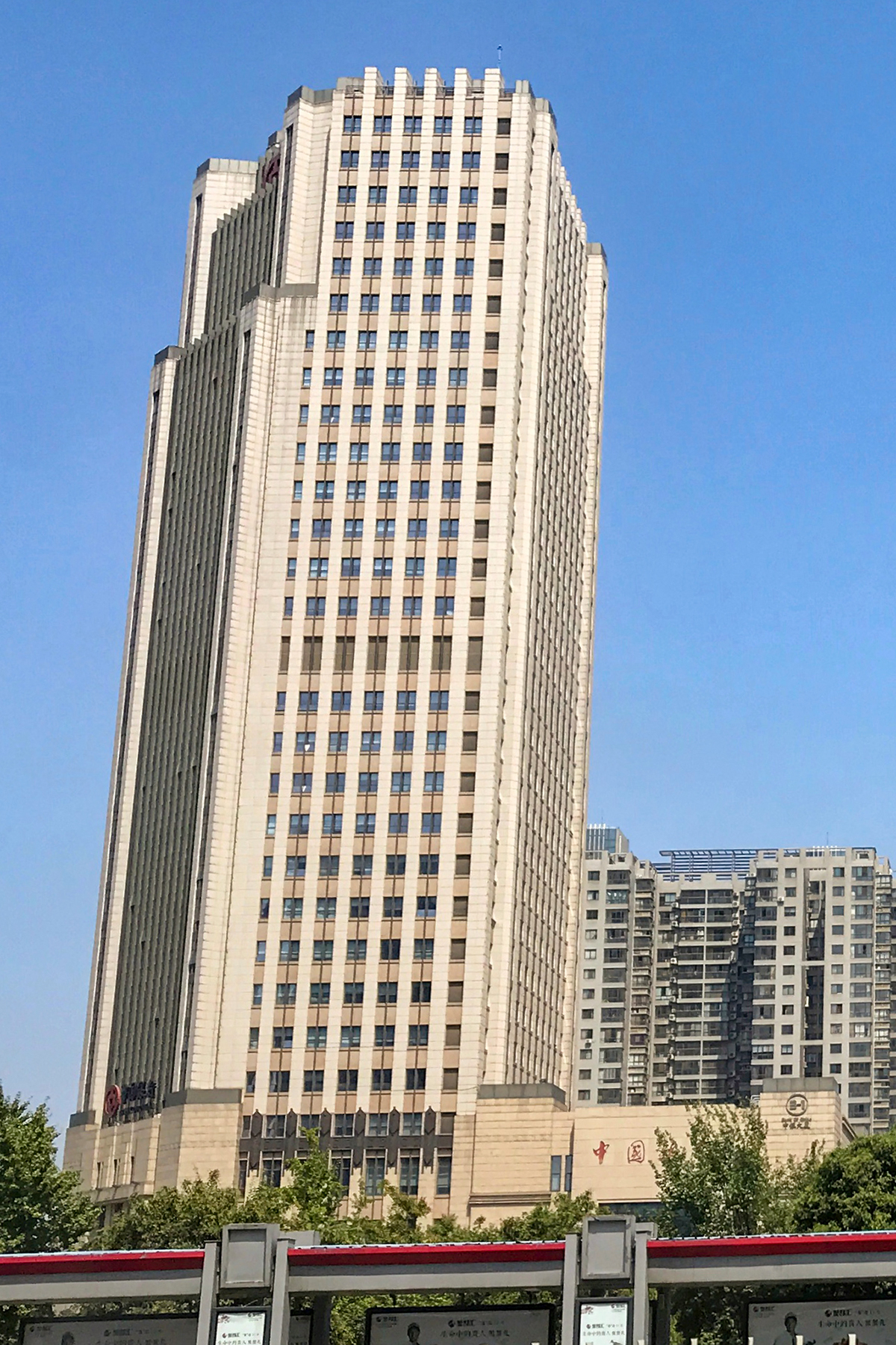
Bank of China in Zhengzhou

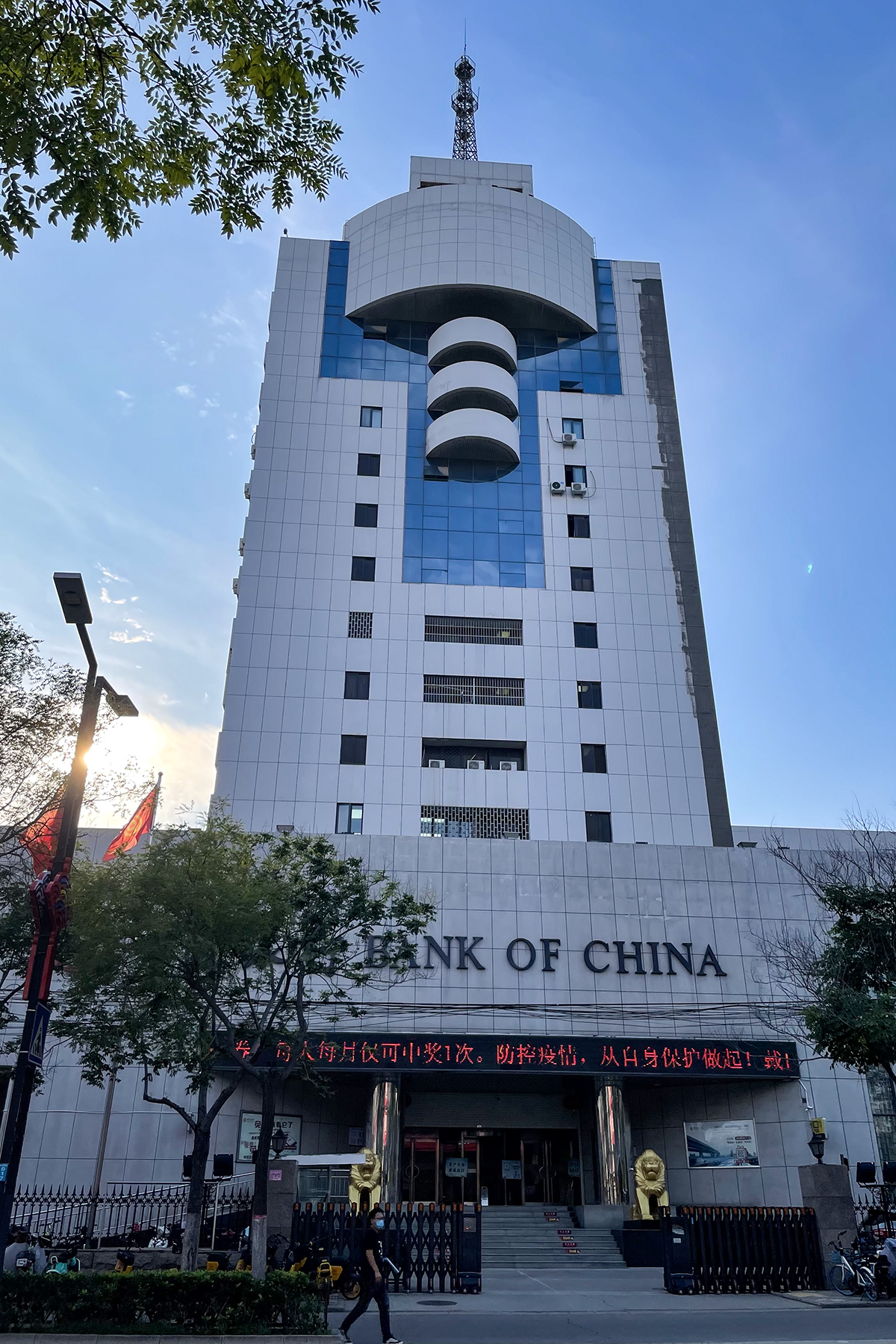
Bank of China in Kaifeng

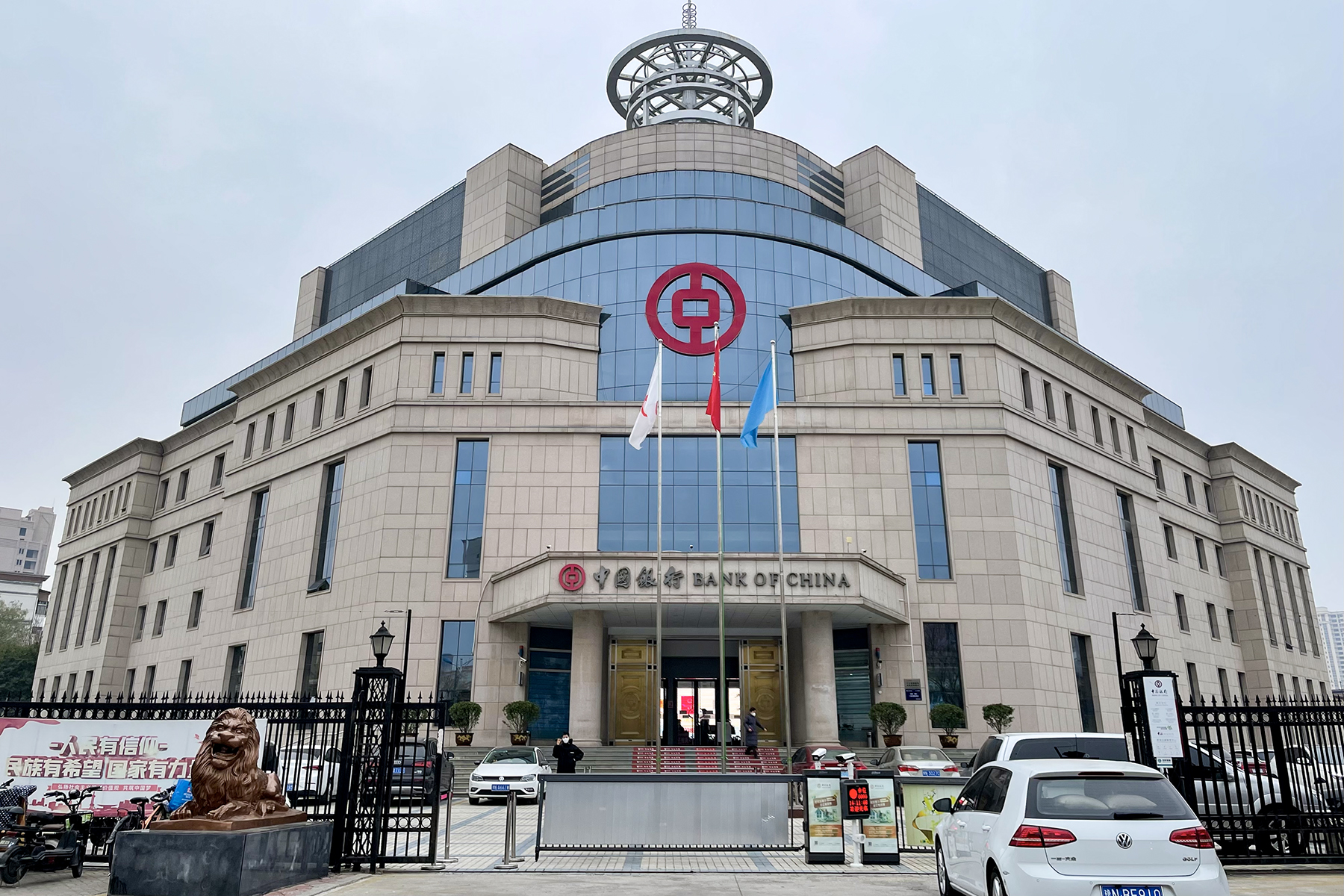
Bank of China in Shangqiu

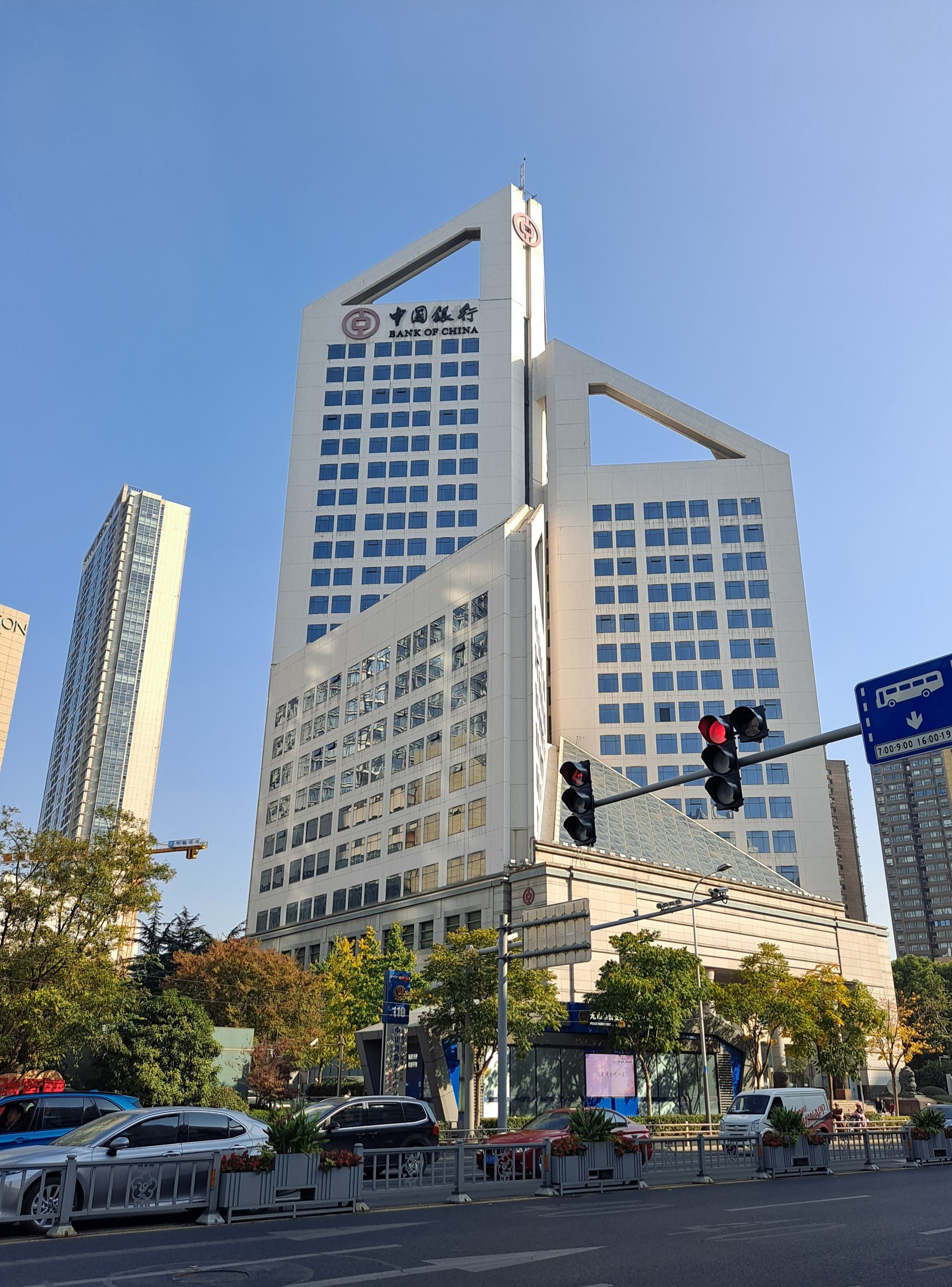
Bank of China in Wuxi

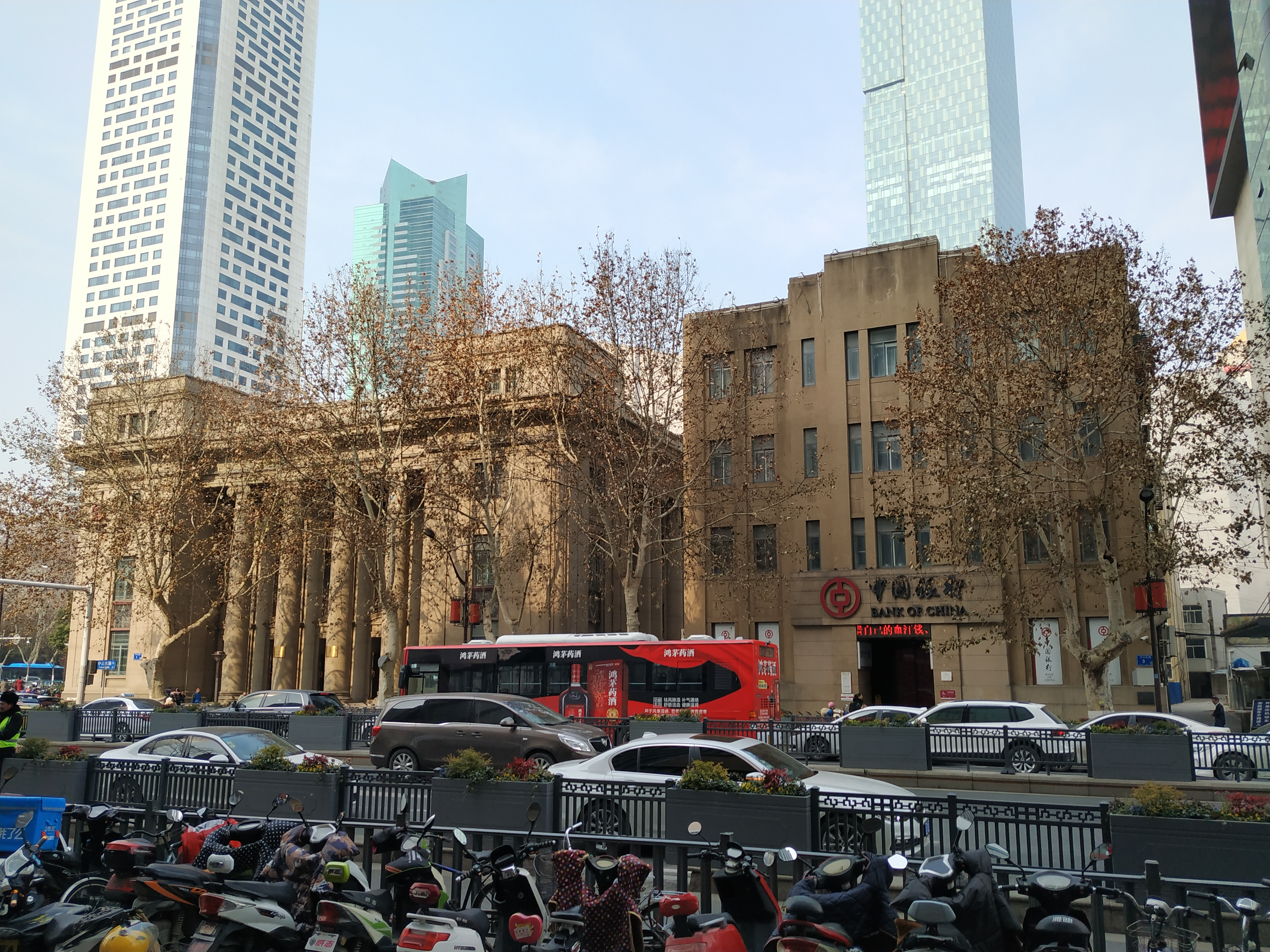
Bank of China in Nanjing (right), former building of National Commercial Bank

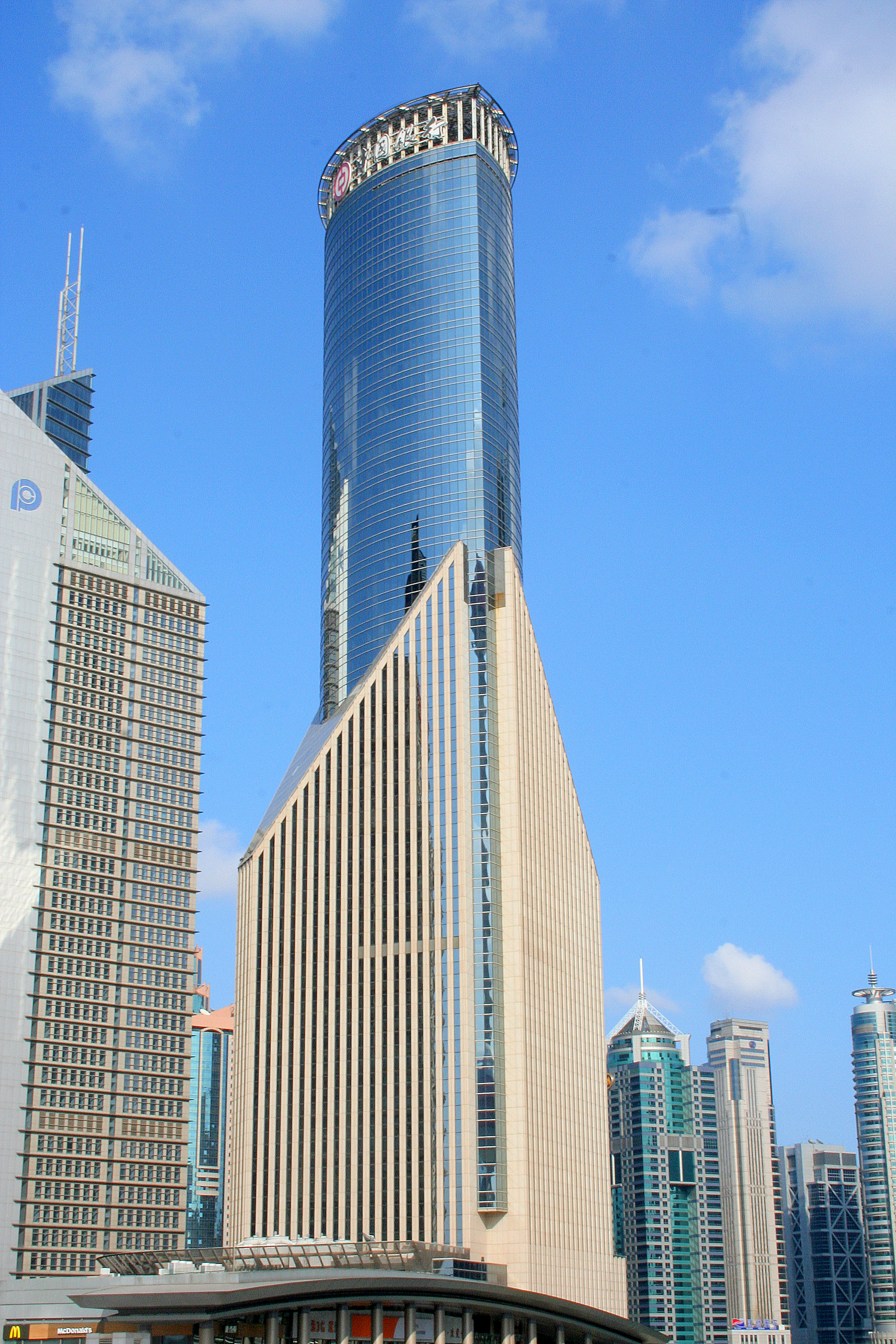
Bank of China Tower in Pudong, Shanghai

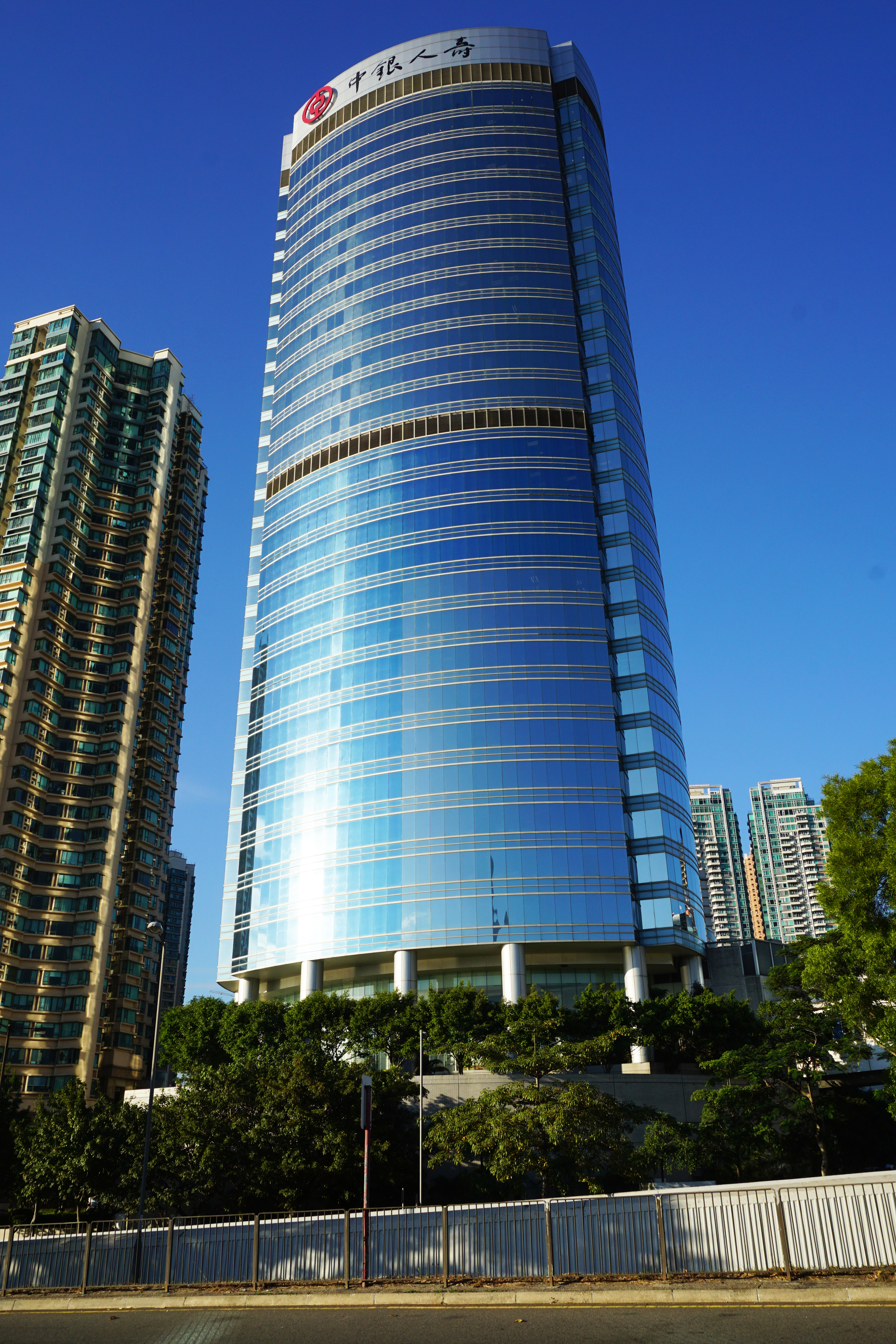
Bank of China Centre, Hong Kong

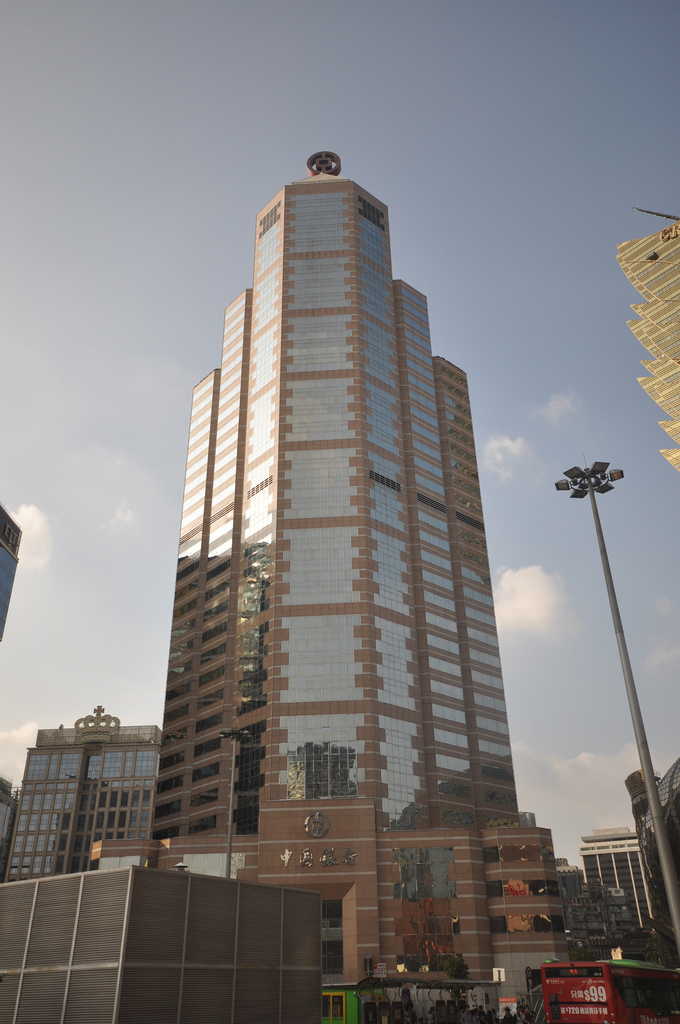
Bank of China tower in Macau

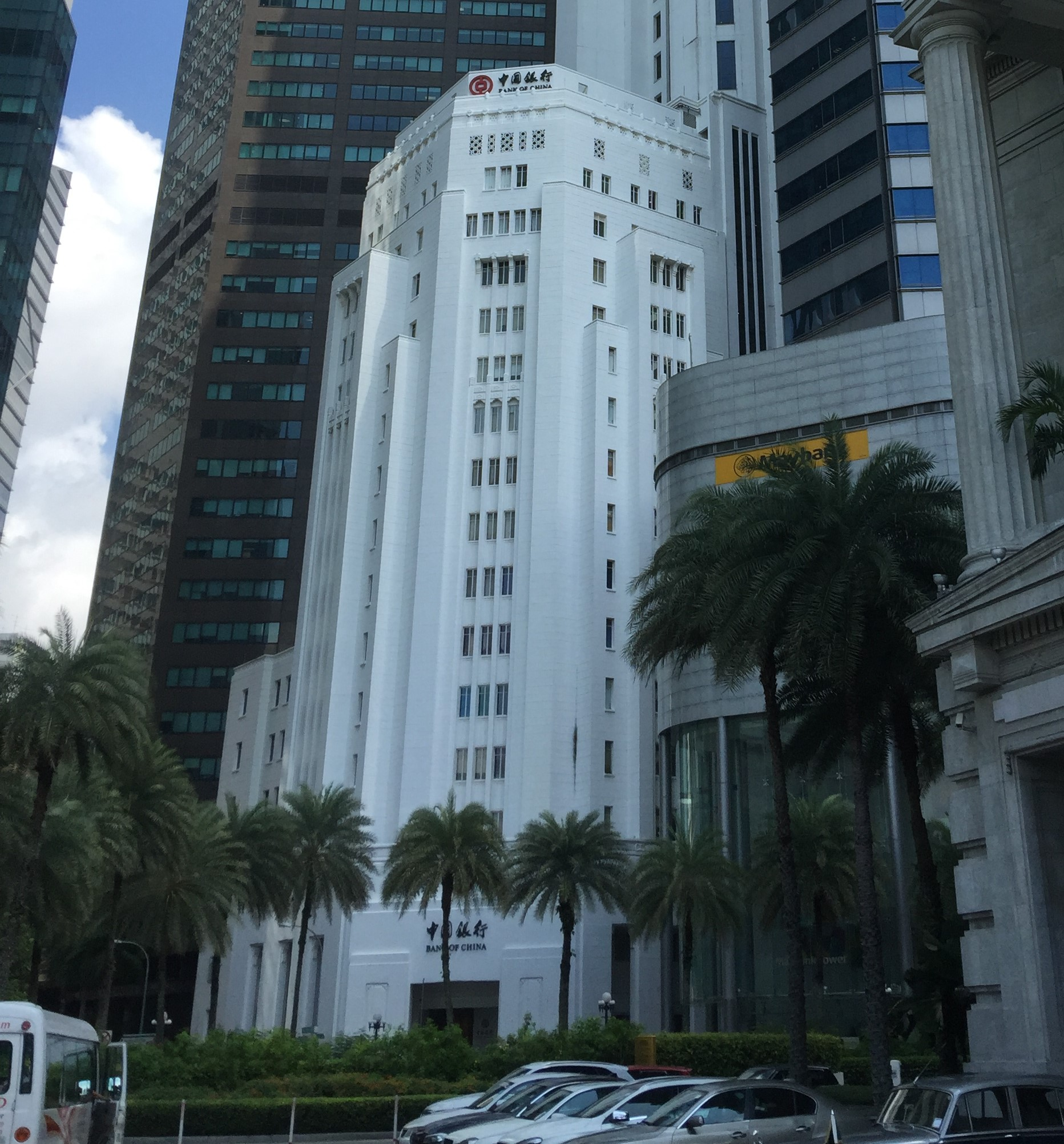
Old Building of the Bank of China building in Singapore

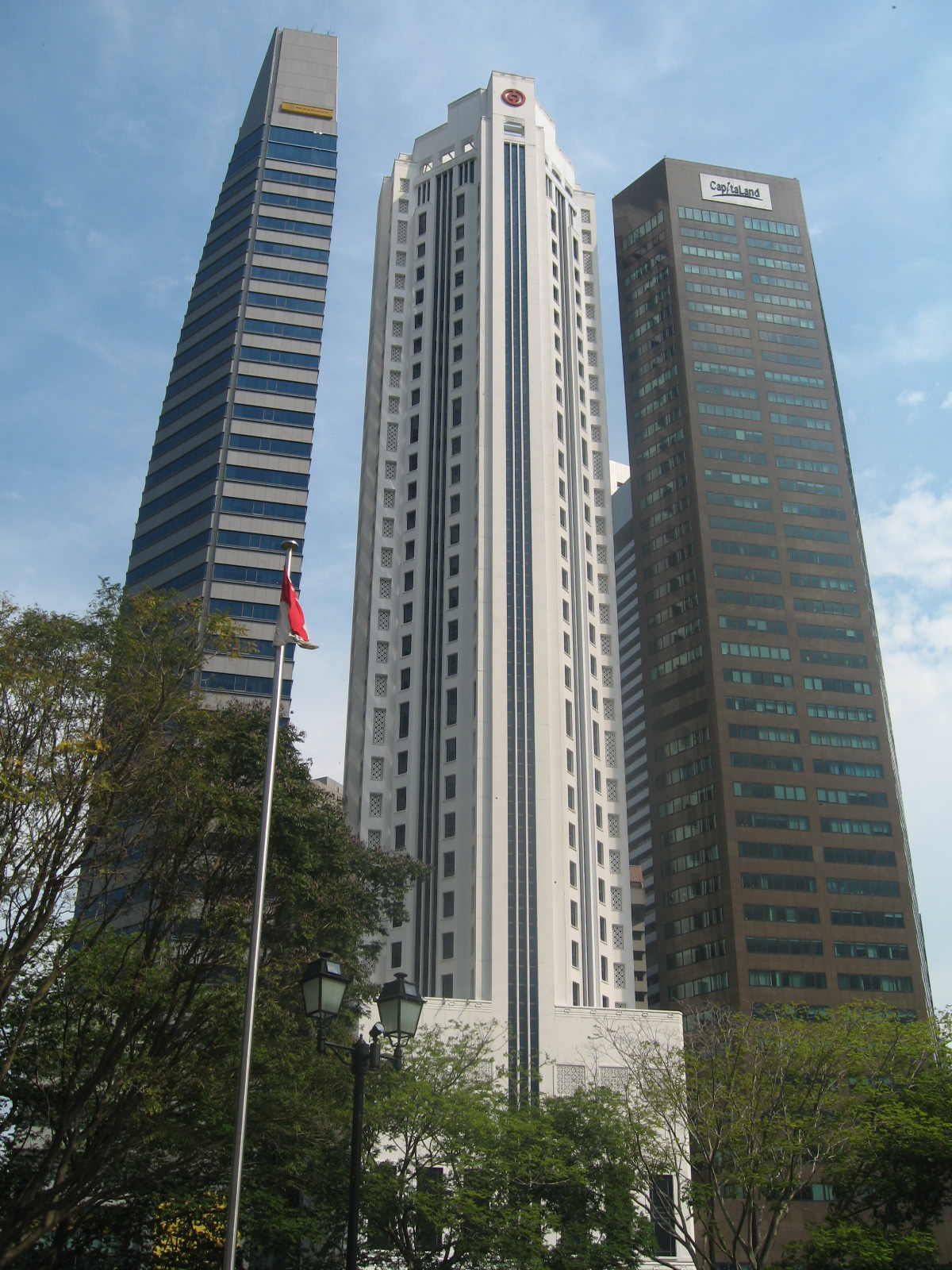
Bank of China Tower in Singapore, adjacent to the Old Building

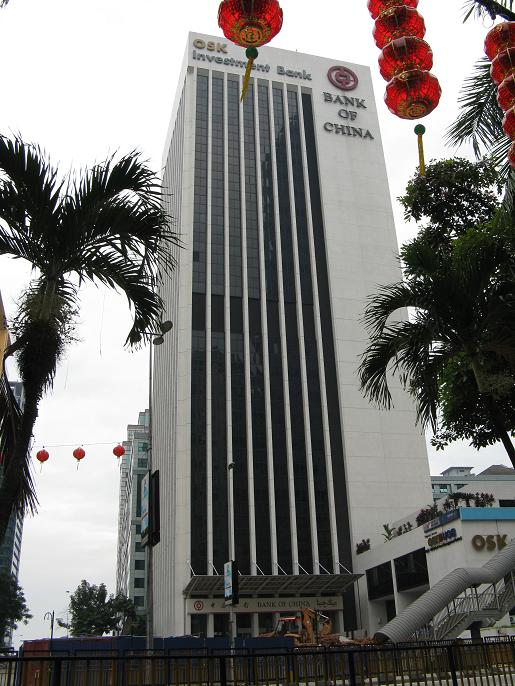
Bank of China Tower in Kuala Lumpur

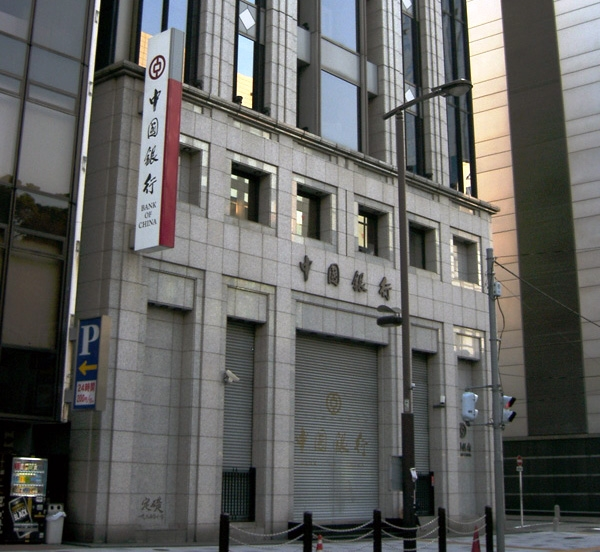
Branch in Tokyo

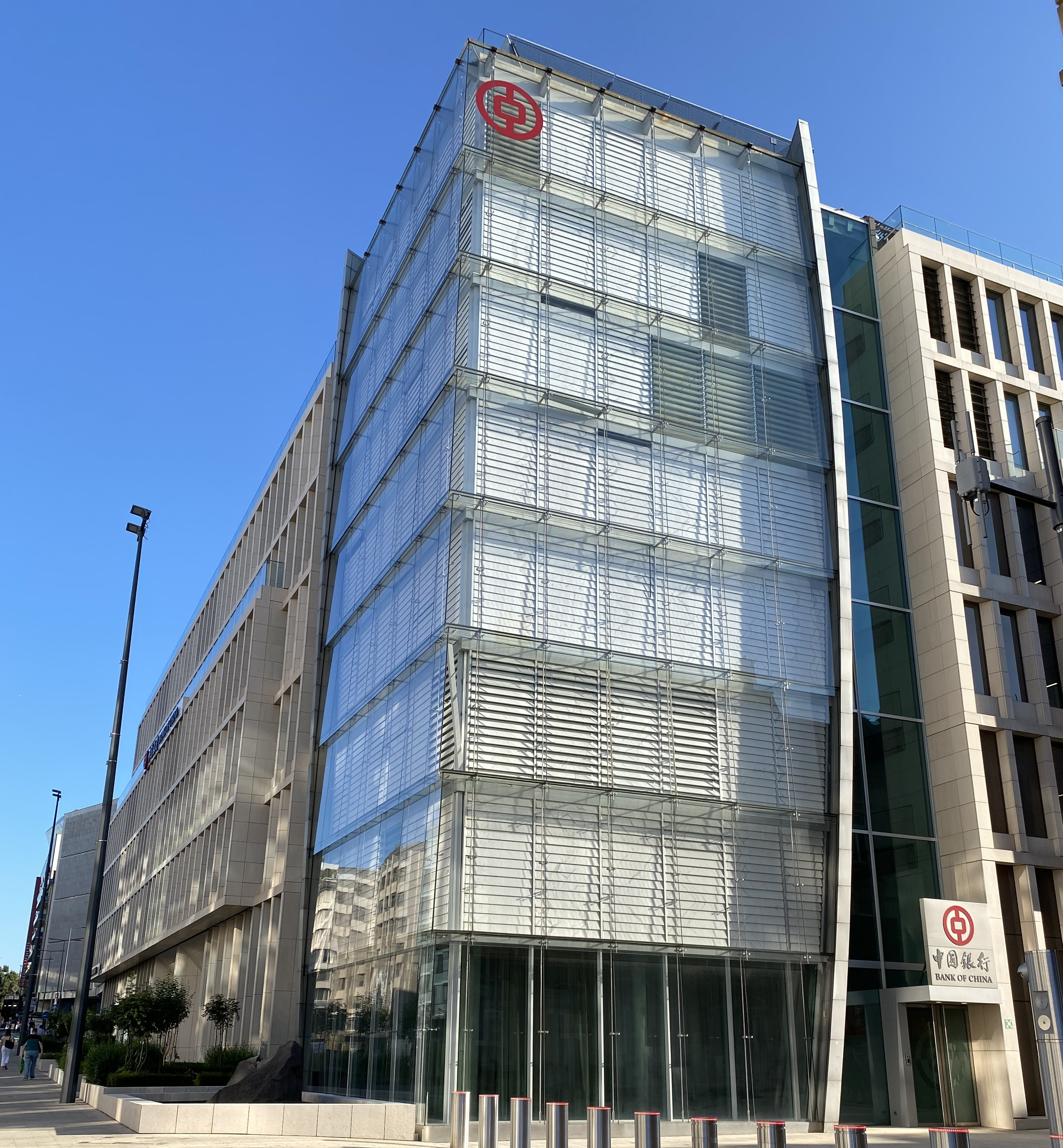
Bank of China in Luxembourg

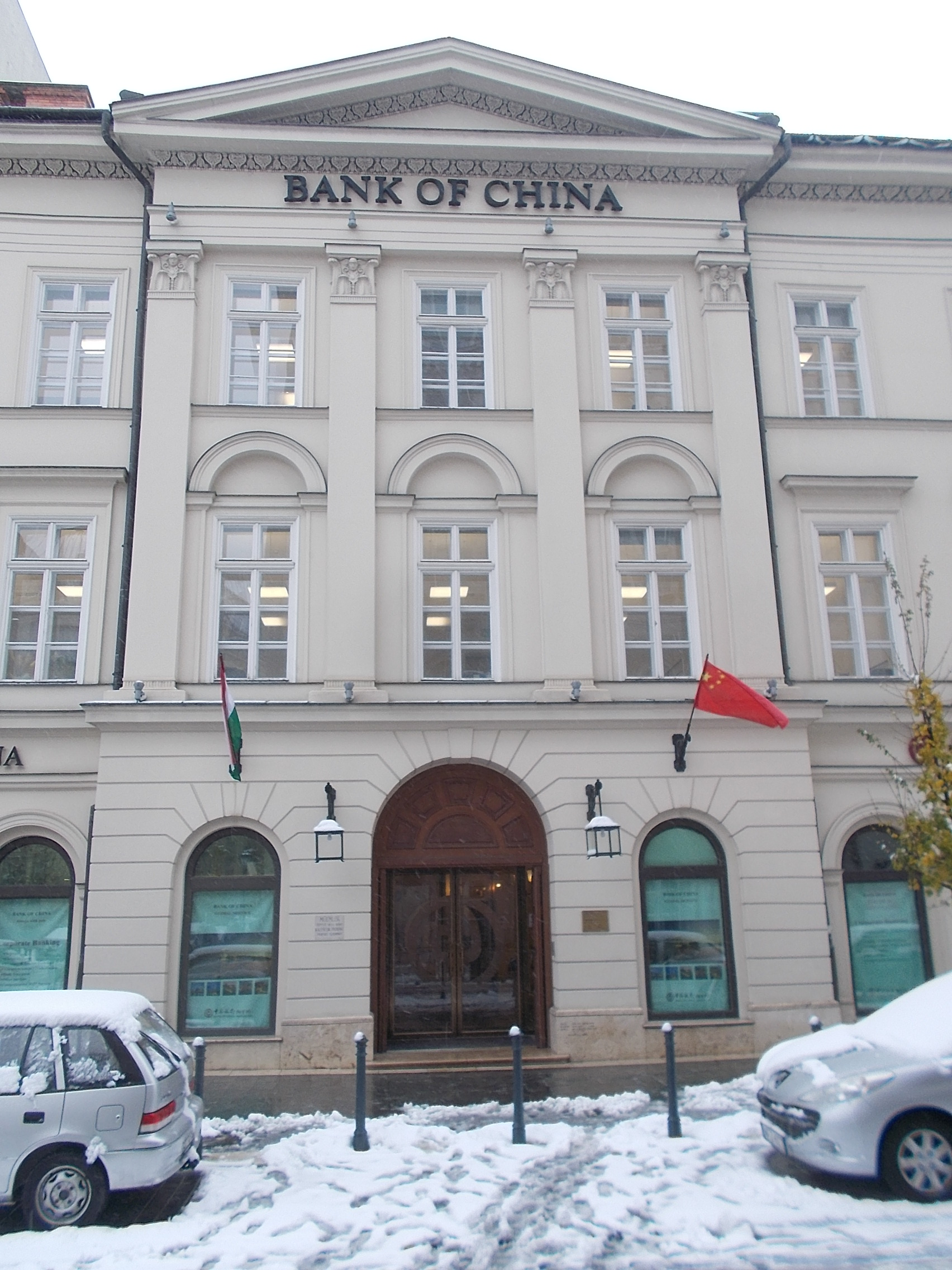
Bank of China in Budapest

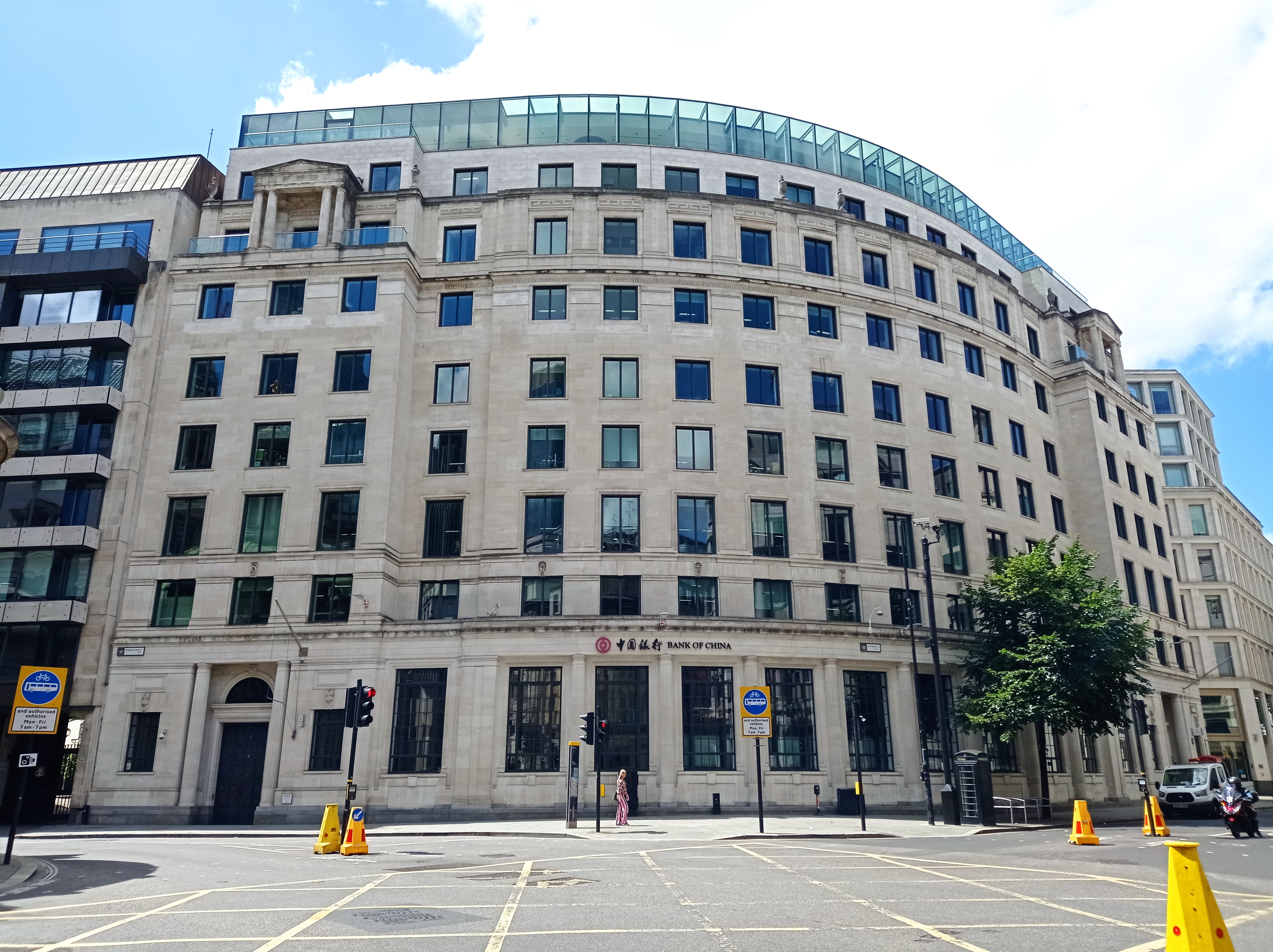
Bank of China building on Lothbury, London

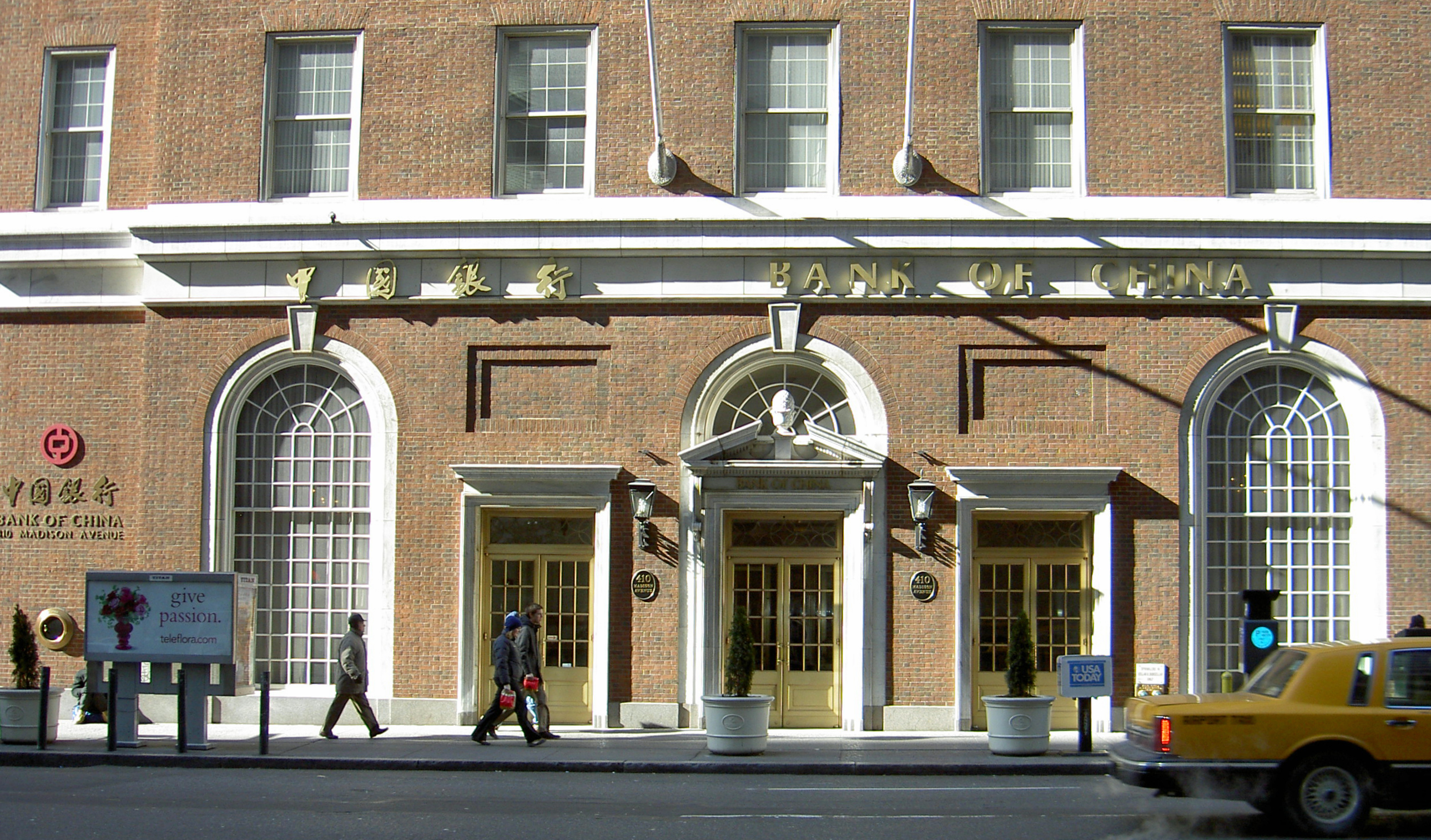
410 Madison Ave, New York City

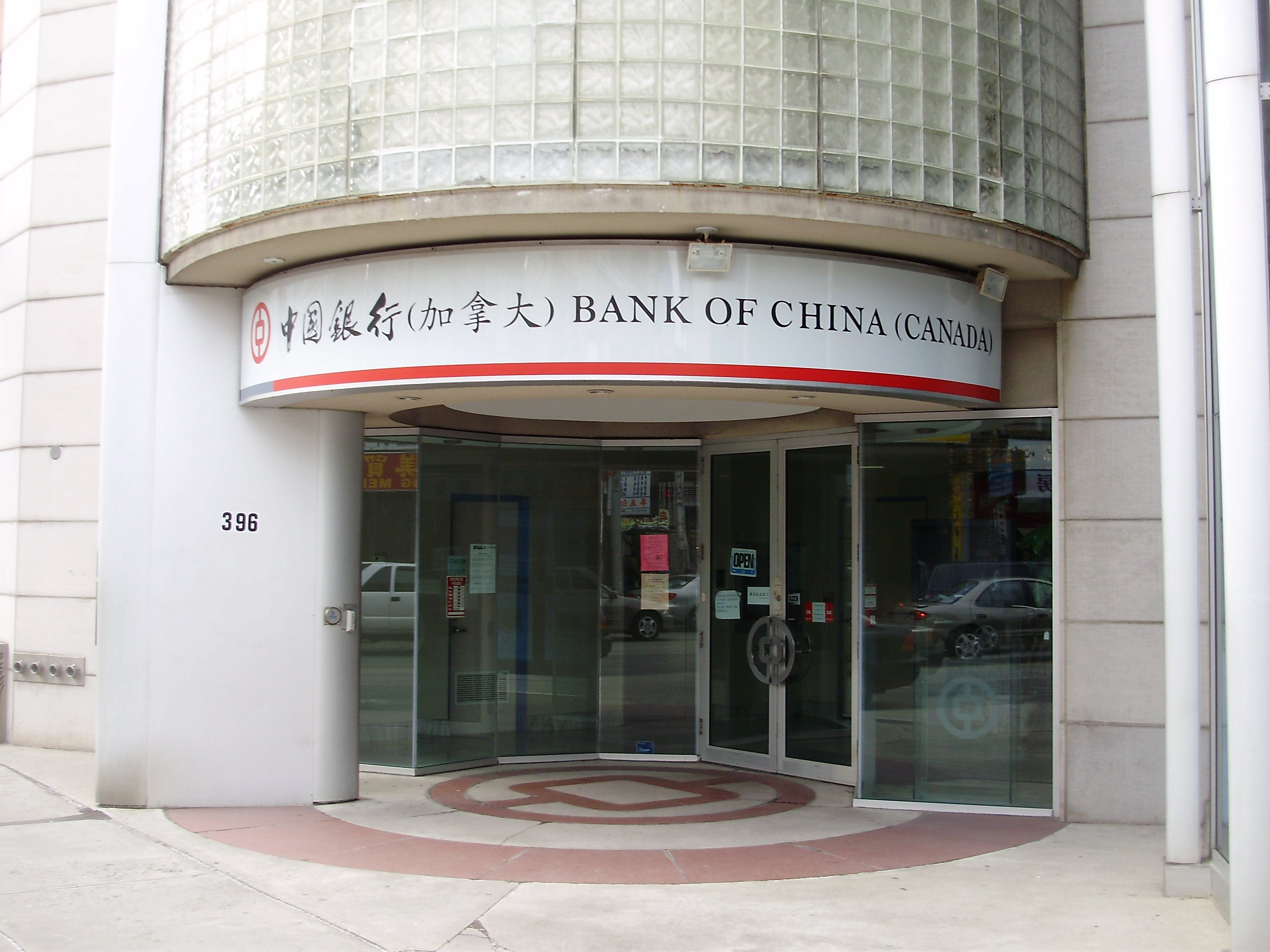
A branch in Chinatown, Toronto

== Major subsidiaries ==
=== Hong Kong ===
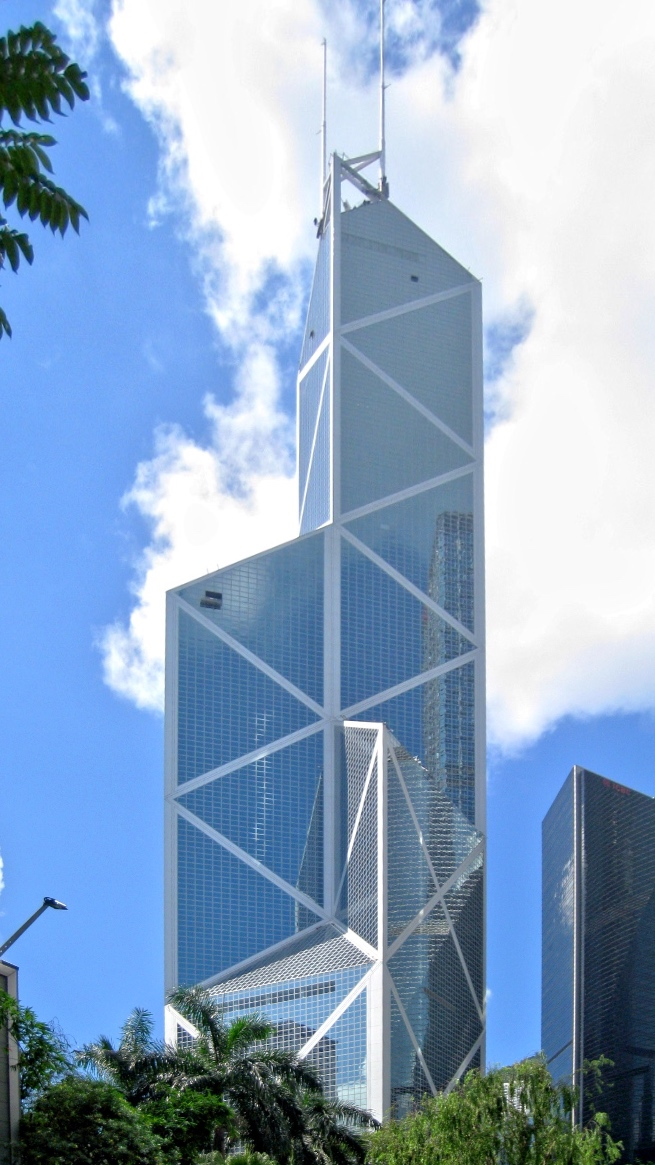
Bank of China Tower in Hong Kong, completed in 1991

BOC started operations in Hong Kong in 1917. It became Hong Kong's third note-issuing bank in 1994, and in Macau in 1995.

In 2001, BOC regrouped its Hong Kong operations into Bank of China (Hong Kong); then BOCHK listed on the Hong Kong Stock Exchange in October 2002. Two-thirds of its share capital are in free float. The bank's headquarters in Hong Kong are located in the Bank of China Tower, designed by the renowned architect I.M. Pei, and was opened to the public in 1990 as the tallest building in Hong Kong at that time.

It listed on the Hong Kong Stock Exchange (independently from BOCHK) (SEHK:3988) by floating the largest initial public offering (IPO) in the world by any institution since 2000 on 1 June 2006, raising US$9.7 billion. The IPO attracted HK$286 billion (US$36.7 billion) in retail orders and was the most heavily oversubscribed in the history of the Hong Kong Stock Exchange. The offer was around 76 times oversubscribed. Although some financial analysts advised caution due to the worrying amounts of non-performing loans, this hardly deterred investors. The IPO share price started at HK$2.95 per share and jumped 15% (to HK$3.40) after the first day of trading.

In 2008, the Bank of China was crowned Deal of the Year - Debt Market Deal of the Year at the 2008 ALB Hong Kong Law Awards.

=== Canada ===
Bank of China (Canada)
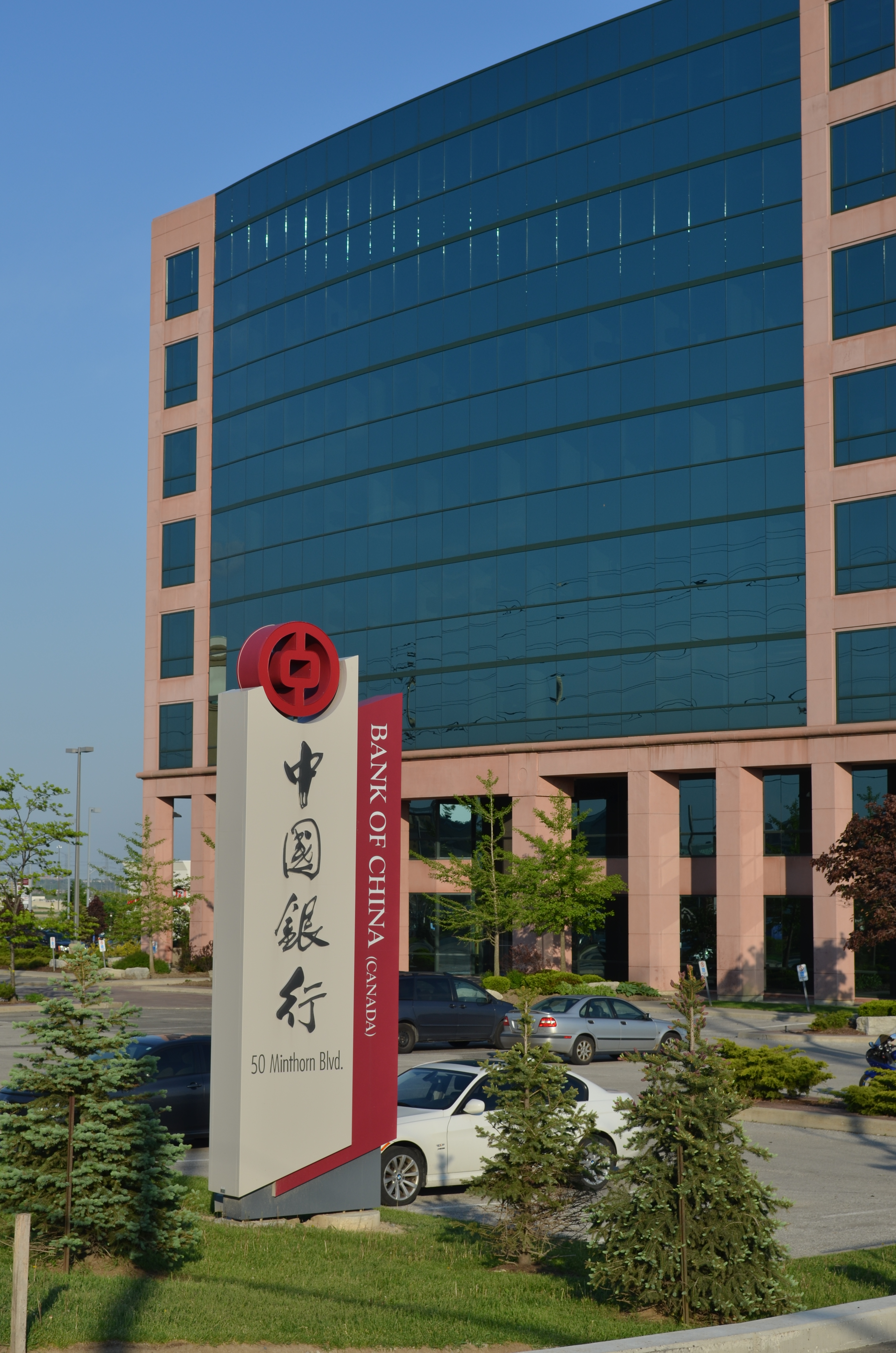
- Bank of China (Canada) headquarters
- Type: Subsidiary
- Industry: Bank
- Predecessor: Bank of China Toronto Representative Office
- Founded: 18 May 1993
- Headquarters: 50 Minthorn Boulevard; Markham, Ontario, Canada
- Areas served: Ontario; British Columbia; Alberta
- Revenue: 473,912,000,000 renminbi (2015)
- Operating income: 229,237,000,000 renminbi (2015)
- Net income: 179,417,000,000 renminbi (2015)
- Total assets: 16,815,597,000,000 renminbi (2015)
- Number of employees: 310,042 (2015)
- Parent: Bank of China
- Website: www.bankofchina.com/ca

Bank of China (Canada), commonly known as BOCC, is the Canadian subsidiary of the Bank of China (BOC). The Bank of China began its business in Canada by opening a representative office in Toronto on 8 September 1992. BOCC was incorporated as a subsidiary of BOC in 1993 under Schedule II of the Bank Act. BOCC provides the following types of banking services in Canada: bank accounts to both personal and commercial banking clients, remittance services (including bank drafts and wire transfers), loans and mortgages, foreign exchange services, and China visa application assistance services where by it acts as agent. However, plans for a China Visa Application Centre are being made and it is anticipated that the Consulate General of the People's Republic of China in Toronto will entrust all future China Visa applications to Bank of China Canada's Visa Application Centre.

In Canada, BOCC has ten locations located in Markham, Toronto (several branches, in downtown, North York and Scarborough], Mississauga, Vancouver, Montreal, and Calgary. It previously had branches in Burnaby and Richmond. The bank is also a member of the Canadian Bankers Association (CBA); registered member with the Canada Deposit Insurance Corporation (CDIC), a federal agency insuring deposits at all of Canada's chartered banks; and, a member of Interac, which handles transactions between automated teller machines of different banks and debit card transactions.

== Banknotes ==
Although it is not a central bank, the Bank of China is licensed to issue banknotes in two of China's Special Administrative Regions. Until 1942, the Bank of China issued banknotes in mainland China on behalf of the Government of the Republic of China. Today, the Bank issues banknotes in Hong Kong and banknotes in Macau, the latter under the Portuguese name "Banco da China, Sucursal de Macau"), along with other commercial banks in those regions.

== Ownership ==
As of 30 September 2015, largest shareholders of the Bank of China ordinary shares (both A shares and H shares) were:

- China Central Huijin (an investment arm of the government of the People's Republic of China): 64.63% (A shares)
- HKSCC Nominees Limited (nominee account): 27.78% (H shares)
- China Securities Finance (state-owned legal person): 2.90% (A shares)

As of 30 September 2015, largest shareholders of the Bank of China preference shares (both domestic and offshore) were:

- The Bank of New York Mellon (custodian bank): 39.96% (offshore)
- China Mobile Communications: 18.01% (domestic)
- China National Tobacco Corporation: 5.00% (domestic)
- Zhongwei Real Estate: 3.00% (domestic)

== Leadership ==
- Wu Dingchang, administrator February - December 1912
- Sun Duosen, president December 1912 - June 1913
- Xiong Xiling, president 1913 - 1916
- Xu Enyuan (徐恩元), president June 1916 - June 1917
- Sun Duosen, president in absentia June - July 1917
- Li Sihao, president June - July 1917
- Wang Kemin, president July 1917 - February 1918
- Feng Gengguang, president February 1918 - June 1922
- Wang Kemin, president June 1922 - October 1923
- Jin Huan, president October 1923 - November 1928
- Feng Gengguang, acting president 1926 - November 1928
- Li Fusun (李馥蓀), chairman November 1928 - April 1935
- Chang Kia-ngau, general manager November 1928 - April 1935
- T. V. Soong, chairman April 1935 - February 1944
- H. H. Kung, chairman February 1944 - 1948
- Song Hanzhang, general manager 1935 - 1948 and managing director 1948 - 1949
- Xi Demao, general manager 1948 - 1949
- Nan Hanchen, chairman after 1949
- Gong Yinbing, general manager 1949 - 1973
- Bu Ming, president June 1979 - April 1982, then chairman
- Chang Yanqing, acting president and acting chairman in the early 1980s
- Jin Deqin, president April 1982 - February 1985
- Wang Deyan, president June 1985 - November 1993
- Wang Xuebing, president November 1993 - February 2000, also chairman from May 1995
- Liu Mingkang, chairman February 2000 - March 2003
- Li Lihui, president August 2004 - January 2014
- Chen Siqing, president February 2014 - August 2017, then chairman August 2017 - April 2019
- Liu Lian'ge, President June 2018–June 2019, then chairman June 2019 - March 2023
- Wang Jiang, president December 2019 - February 2021
- Liu Jin, president April 2021 - August 2024

== Controversies ==
=== Guarantee scandal in Poland ===
After COVEC withdrew from completing its construction of the A2 highway in Poland, Bank of China was to pay a performance guarantee to the Polish government's road organization GDDKiA. However, with Export-Import Bank of China, they refused to pay this; only Deutsche Bank honoured its obligations under the court decision.

=== Wultz v. Bank of China ===
On 8 August 2008, the family of Daniel Wultz, an American teenager killed in a 2006 terrorist attack in Israel, filed suit against the Bank of China in U.S. District Court for the District of Columbia. The case was subsequently transferred to the United States District Court, Southern District of New York, where litigation continues. On 29 October 2012, the Honorable J. Scheindlin issued a ruling compelling Bank of China to provide discovery.

=== Alleged money transfers to Hamas ===
In 2012, the families of eight terror victims of the 2008 Mercaz HaRav massacre in Jerusalem filed a $1 billion lawsuit against the Bank of China. The suit asserted that in 2003 the bank's New York branch wired millions of dollars to Hamas from its leadership in Syria and Iran. The Bank of China subsequently denied providing banking services to terrorist groups: "The Bank of China has always strictly followed the UN's anti-money laundering and anti-terrorist financing requirements and regulations in China and other judicial areas where we operate."

== See also ==
- List of largest banks
- List of asset management companies of the People's Republic of China
- Foreign exchange reserves of the People's Republic of China
- BOC Aviation – Singapore-based aircraft leasing company owned by BOC

== Resources ==
- Bank of China, A History of the Bank of China, 1912–1949, Beijing: 1999.
