= Ge Haijiao =

Chinese politician and banker

- 葛海蛟

Communist Party Secretary of the Bank of China
- Incumbent
- Assumed office 31 March 2023
- Preceded by: Liu Liange

Personal details
- Born: December 1971 (age 54) Liaozhong County, Liaoning, China
- Party: Chinese Communist Party
- Education: Liaoning University; Jilin University; Nanjing Agricultural University

Ge Haijiao (Chinese: 葛海蛟; pinyin: Gě Hǎijiāo; born December 1971) is a Chinese politician and banker, currently serving as the Chinese Communist Party Committee Secretary of the Bank of China, in office since 31 March 2023.

He is a representative of the 20th National Congress of the Chinese Communist Party. He is a delegate to the 14th National People's Congress.

== Early life and education ==
Ge was born in Liaozhong County (now Liaozhong District of Shenyang), Liaoning, in December 1971. He attended Liaoning University where he received his bachelor's degree in international finance in 1993. After completing his master's degree in world economy from Jilin University in 1999, he entered Nanjing Agricultural University where he obtained his doctor's degree in finance in 2000.

== Career ==
After graduating from Liaoning University, Ge worked in the Agricultural Bank of China before being transferred to the China Everbright Group Co., Ltd. in December 2016. He served as governor of China Everbright Bank from November 2018 to September 2019. He joined the Chinese Communist Party (CCP) in January 1998.

Ge got involved in politics in September 2019, when he was appointed vice governor of Hebei. He was elevated to executive vice governor in December 2021 and was admitted to member of the Hebei Provincial Committee of the Chinese Communist Party, the province's top authority.

On 31 March 2023, Ge was chosen as Chinese Communist Party Committee Secretary of the Bank of China, succeeding Liu Liange, who was put under investigation for alleged "serious violations of discipline and laws" by China's top anti-graft agency in the same month.

Government offices
Preceded by Yuan Tongli	Executive Vice Governor of Hebei; 2021–2023	Succeeded by TBA
Business positions
Preceded by Zhang Jinliang	Governor of China Everbright Bank; 2018–2019	Succeeded by Liu Jin (刘金)
Party political offices
Preceded by Liu Liange	Communist Party Secretary of the Bank of China; 2023–present	Incumbent
