= Li Ruogu =

Chinese banker (born 1951)

- 李若谷
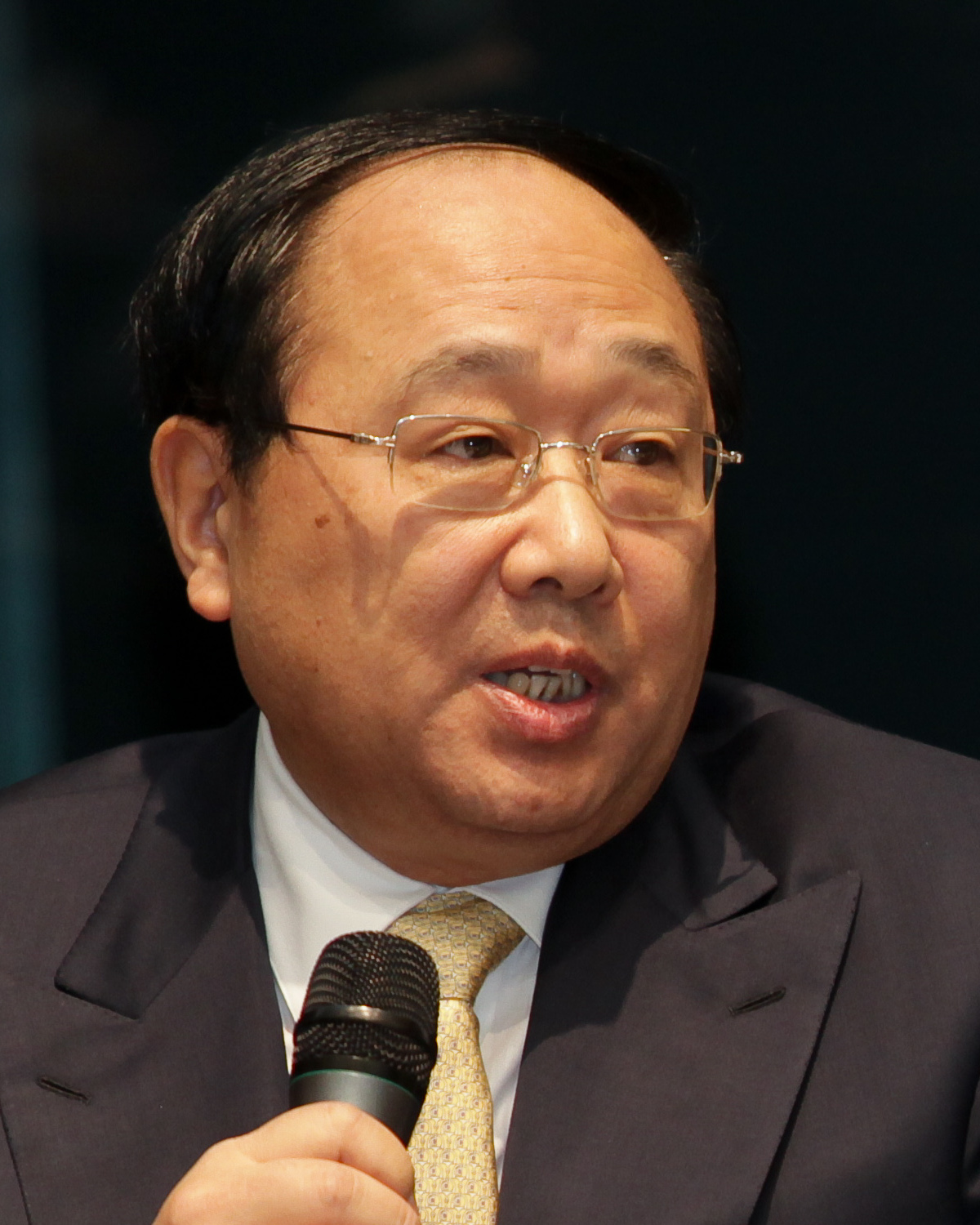
- Li in 2010

President of the Exim Bank of China
- In office June 2005 – February 2015
- Preceded by: Yang Zilin
- Succeeded by: Liu Liange

Personal details
- Born: January 1951 (age 75) China
- Party: Chinese Communist Party
- Education: Peking University; Princeton University

Li Ruogu (Chinese: 李若谷; pinyin: Lǐ Ruògǔ; born January 1951) is a Chinese banker who served as chairman and president of the Export-Import Bank of China (Exim Bank) from 2005 to 2015.

== Biography ==
Li Ruogu graduated with a Masters in Law from Beijing University in 1981 and a Masters in Public Administration from Princeton University in 1983. He was briefly an assistant professor at Beijing University before joining the People's Bank of China in 1985. In the 1990s, Li spent a year as an International Monetary Fund economist and four years at the Asian Development Bank as the chief representative of China, as well as acting as liaison to the African Development Bank. He was at the position of Deputy Governor in charge of international affairs in the People's Bank of China before moving to Exim Bank in late 2005.

In July 2006, Li met with Sri Lankan foreign minister Mangala Samaraweera in Beijing. After Samaraweera's visit, Sri Lanka and China announced that the two countries would support the involvement of Chinese companies in infrastructure projects in Sri Lanka and encourage concessional loans to finance such projects. His tenure at Exim Bank ended in 2015.

Business positions
Preceded by Yang Zilin	President of the Exim Bank of China; 2005–2015	Succeeded by Liu Liange
