= Chen Siqing =

Chinese banker

- 陈四清

Chairman of the Board of the Industrial and Commercial Bank of China
- Incumbent
- Assumed office April 2019
- Preceded by: Yi Huiman

Chairman the Board of the Bank of China
- In office August 2017 – April 2019
- Preceded by: Tian Guoli
- Succeeded by: Liu Liange

President of the Bank of China
- In office February 2014 – August 2017
- Preceded by: Li Lihui
- Succeeded by: Liu Liange

Personal details
- Born: 2 April 1960 (age 66) Xiangyin County, Hunan, China
- Party: Chinese Communist Party
- Education: Zhongnan University of Economics and Law; Murdoch University

Chinese name
- Simplified Chinese: 陈四清
- Traditional Chinese: 陳四清
Transcriptions
Standard Mandarin
- Hanyu Pinyin: Chén Sìqīng

Chen Siqing (Chinese: 陈四清; born 2 April 1960) is a Chinese banker who is the current chairman of the board of the Industrial and Commercial Bank of China, in office since April 2019. He previously served as chairman the board of the Bank of China and before that, president of the Bank of China.

He is an alternate of the 19th Central Committee of the Chinese Communist Party and a representative of the 19th National Congress of the Chinese Communist Party.

== Biography ==
Chen was born in Xiangyin County, Hunan, on 2 April 1960. In 1982, he entered Hubei College of Finance and Economics (now Zhongnan University of Economics and Law), majoring in the Infrastructure Finance and Credit Department. He also earned his M.B.A. from Murdoch University in 1999.

Beginning in 1990, he served in several posts in the Bank of China, including assistant president and vice president of Fujian Branch, general manager of the Risk Management Department, and president of Guangdong Branch. He became vice president of the bank in June 2008. In February 2014, the bank has appointed him as its president, succeeding Li Lihui who has reached retirement age. On 31 July 2017, he was promoted to become chairman the board of the bank.

In April 2019, he was named chairman of the board of the Industrial and Commercial Bank of China, replacing Yi Huiman, who will become chairman of China Securities Regulatory Commission.

Business positions
Preceded by Li Lihui	President of the Bank of China; 2014–2017	Succeeded by Liu Liange
Preceded by Tian Guoli	Chairman the Board of the Bank of China; 2017–2019	Succeeded by Liu Liange
Preceded by Yi Huiman	Chairman of the Board of the Industrial and Commercial Bank of China; 2019–present	Incumbent
