= Liu Mingkang =

Chinese politician and economist

- 刘明康
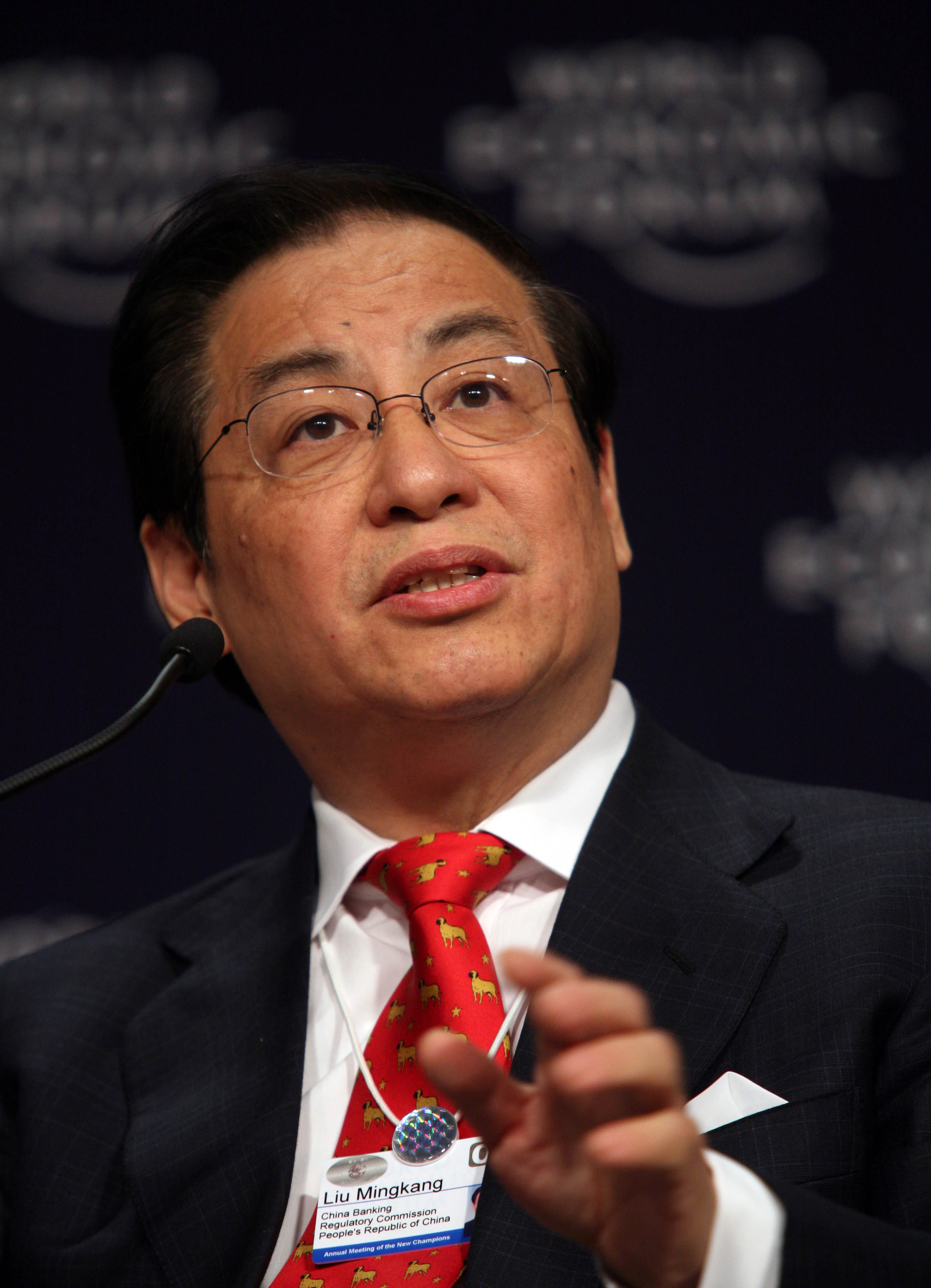
- Born: August 28, 1946 (age 79); Fuzhou, Fujian
- Education: University of London
- Known for: Economic reformist Politician; Public Servant

Liu Mingkang (Chinese: 刘明康) (born August 28, 1946 in Fuzhou, Fujian) is a Chinese former politician and economist. He worked in the China Banking Regulatory Commission, as well as the Bank of China and the People's Bank of China

== Early life and education ==
Liu grew up in Shanghai and graduated high school in 1965. After graduating, he did manual labor work on a farm in Jiangsu province. In 1979 he passed the civil service exam.

He completed an MBA at City University of London.

== Career ==
From 1998 to 1999, Liu was the Deputy Governor of the People's Bank of China, working as the vice chairman of the Monetary Policy Department.

From 2000 to 2003, Liu was the chairman at the Bank of China

From 2003 to 2011, Liu worked as a chairman in the China Banking Regulatory commission.
