= Jilin University of Finance and Economics =

Provincial public university located in Changchun, Jilin, China

Coordinates: 43.8166°N 125.4423°E

The Jilin University of Finance and Economics (Chinese: 吉林财经大学; pinyin: Jílín Cáijīng DaXué) is a provincial public university located in Changchun, Jilin, China. It is affiliated with the Jilin Provincial Government, and co-sponsored by the Jilin Provincial Government and the State Taxation Administration.

The institution was known as Changchun Tax College (长春税务学院) before being granted university status by the Ministry of Education of China in March 2010.
