= United States–China talks in Alaska =

Bilateral diplomatic meeting on US-Chinese disputes held between March 18 and 19, 2021

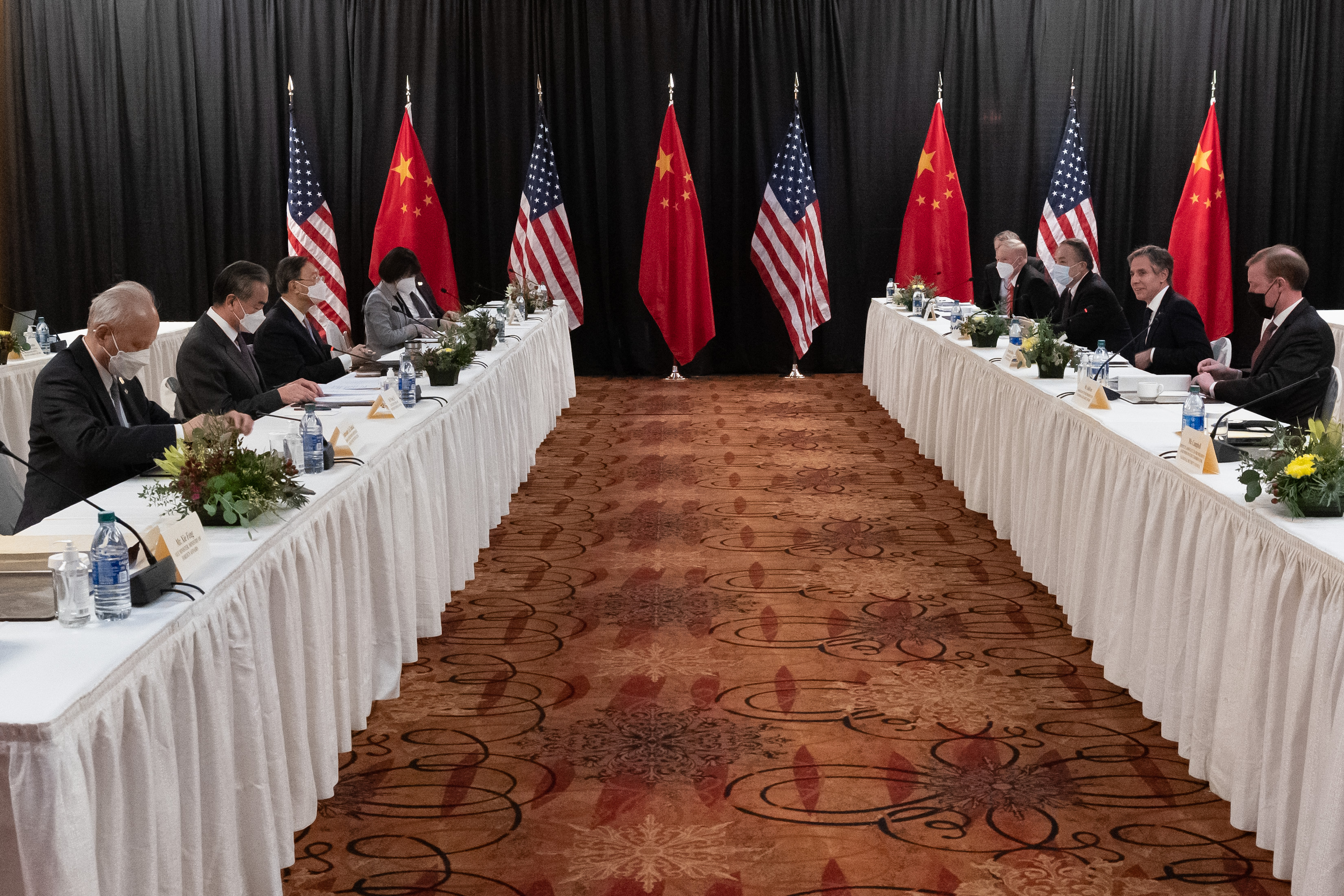
Secretary Anthony Blinken and National Security Advisor Jake Sullivan (right), meeting with Director Yang Jiechi and State Councilor Wang Yi (left).

The United States–China talks in Alaska, also referred to as the Alaska talks or the Anchorage meetings, were a series of meetings held from March 18–19, 2021 at Anchorage, Alaska between representatives of the two countries to discuss a range of issues that affected the U.S.-China relationship. The talks were the Biden administration's first face-to-face meeting with Chinese diplomats. Some American officials who attended the talks include Secretary of State Antony Blinken and National Security Advisor Jake Sullivan. Some Chinese officials who attended the talks include Yang Jiechi, a member of the Politburo of the Chinese Communist Party, and foreign minister Wang Yi.

== Background ==
Preceding the talks, diplomatic relations between China and the United States were strained due to differing positions on trade, cyber espionage and human rights issues. In the week before the talks, the Biden administration did the following: met with South Korea to reaffirm their alliance, imposed sanctions on senior Chinese officials along with the UK, the EU and Canada, and met with the other members of Quadrilateral Security Dialogue. Barry Pavel of the Atlantic Council mentioned that this sequence of meetings in advance of the US–China meeting was to show the approach of the Biden administration: consulting with allies and partners, presenting a united front, and countering what he calls China's tactic "to pick countries off one by one, as part of a divide-and-conquer strategy".

Anchorage was chosen as the city to hold the talks due to it being the mid-point between China and the United States. Pang Zhongying—an international relations specialist at Nankai University—said that holding the meeting there showed "goodwill", but that "it is already very difficult for the two sides to have this meeting just 50 days after Biden came into office".

Prior to the event, the United States stated that the meeting was going to be a one-off event that would be used to air a "long list of [U.S.] concerns" with China while China portrayed it as a high level strategic dialogue that presented the country with an opportunity to reset relations with the United States and negotiate an end to the Trump era trade restrictions.

== Talks ==
The United States relationship with China will be competitive where it should be, collaborative where it can be, and adversarial where it must be.

— Antony Blinken, Secretary of State (United States of America), public statement during the second day of talks

The first day of talks were noted for ending in mutual public denunciations by both sides. It began with Blinken accusing China of threatening international order by taking hostile actions against Xinjiang, Hong Kong and Taiwan, launching cyberattacks against the United States and using economic coercion against America's allies. Yang responded by accusing the United States of "condescension and hypocrisy," that it was important for the United States to "change its own image and to stop advancing its own democracy in the rest of the world" and that the United States and its allies did not represent global public opinion and accused the United States of being a global leader in cyber espionage. Blinken responded by citing his impressions from his recent engagements with foreign leaders which he said undermined the assertions that Yang made. Both sides accused the other of breaking diplomatic protocol.

The conference ended on the second day without any joint statements, but both sides agreed on the value of using the talks as an opportunity to hear and better understand each other's issues and to continue cooperation on issues related to climate change. The Chinese representatives told the media that the talks were "direct, frank, and constructive" while also affirming their commitment to "safeguard [their] national sovereignty". They also said the U.S. agreed to continue to uphold the one-China principle whilst also stating that the issue of Taiwan was one that the American government was "fundamentally at odds" with it. The American representatives stated that the talks were "substantive, serious, and direct". Both sides agreed to maintain open channels for continued dialogue and communication.

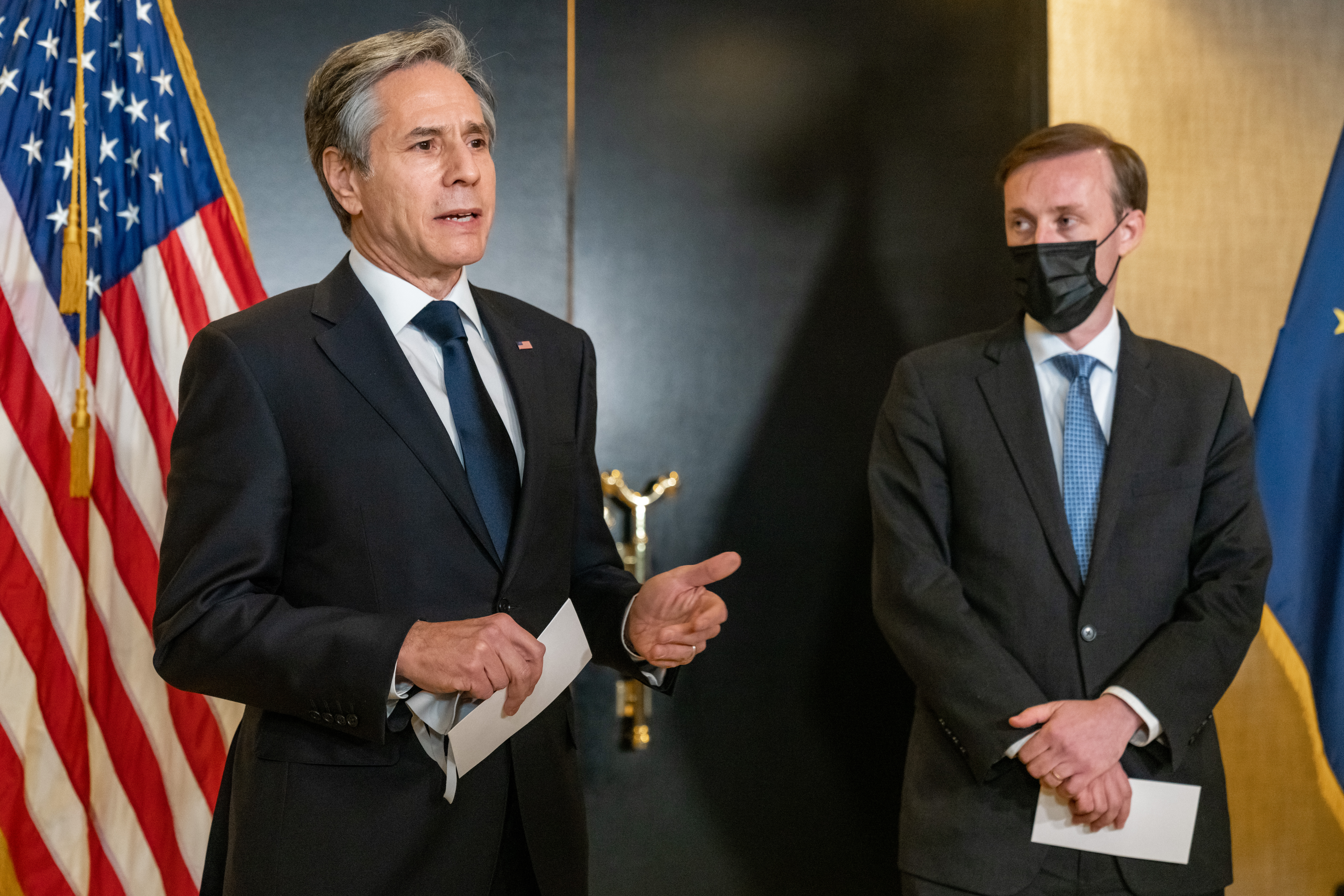
Blinken and Sullivan delivering statements to the press following their meetings with Chinese officials.

After the meeting, Blinken stated to the media that America's intention during the talks was to share "the significant concerns that we have about a number of the actions that China’s taken and the behavior it’s exhibiting—concerns shared by our allies and partners. And we did that. We also wanted to lay out very clearly our own policies, priorities, and worldview, and we did that too." When asked to comment on Thursday's meetings, President Biden said he was proud of Blinken.

=== Issues discussed ===
Issues publicly raised by the Americans included:

- Taiwanese security
- Political suppression in Hong Kong
- Persecution of Uyghurs in China
- Chinese espionage in the United States, notably the 2021 Microsoft Exchange Server data breach
- Economic coercion of American allies such as the Australia-China trade war.
- Alleged military coercion of American allies and partners by China.

Issues publicly raised by the Chinese included:

- Alleged interference in China's internal affairs under the guise of human rights issues, such as in Hong Kong, Xinjiang and Tibet.
- Adherence to the one-China principle
- Alleged double standards on counter-terrorism with regards to governance in Xinjiang.
- Trade sanctions and tariffs imposed during and after the China–United States trade war
- Accusations of the United States being hypocritical on race relations and human rights by bringing up Black Lives Matter protests.
- Alleged presence of a "Cold War mentality" within the American government when dealing with China.

Canadian prime minister Justin Trudeau stated that he was confident that the American delegation would bring up the detention of Michael Spavor and Michael Kovrig as a topic of discussion with their Chinese interlocutors at the talks.

== Impact ==
An assessment by the International Institute for Strategic Studies said that compared to the Trump administration's policy towards China, the altercations during the meeting signaled the adoption of a more ideological and alliance-based approach from the Biden administration. In his book The Internationalists, Alexander Ward said Blinken's response to Yang reflected the administration's goal of highlighting the country's enduring capacity for global leadership. Elizabeth Economy said the administration's interim national security strategic guidance addressed many of Yang's criticisms, although she said it should be seen as a prelude to further action that the administration needed to take to repair the damage to America's global standing caused by the policies of the Trump administration. The conservative American publication The National Interest stated that China likely got the "wrong message" from the meeting by showing no recognition that the American negotiators were also representing the interests and concerns of America's allies. The Washington Post stated that the talks shattered any "illusions of a reset in U.S.-China relations" following the end of the Trump administration.

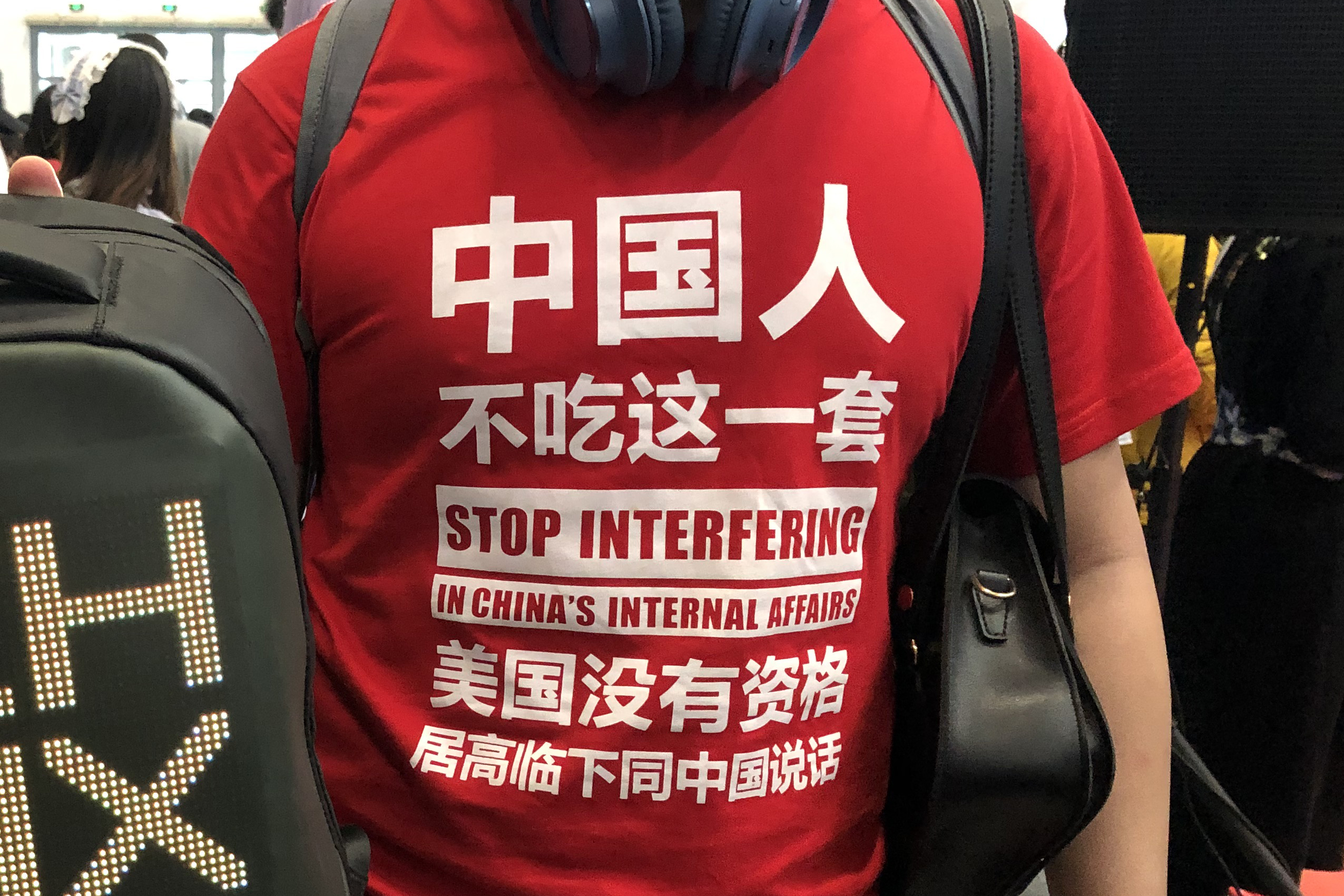
"Stop interfering in China's internal affairs", the quotation of Yang Jiechi during the talks, on a red T-shirt

In China, state-owned media such as the Global Times and People's Daily described the talks as historic for marking a change in power relations between the two countries. This was due to the Chinese refusal to accept that the United States could, from the Chinese perspective, negotiate from a position of power. The Diplomat wrote that the Chinese were likely trying to permanently change America's negotiating posture with China by signaling that China would no longer accept any direct criticism and now demanded respect in the context of a new type of great power relations. The talks also increased anti-American nationalism with merchandise quoting statements made by Yang and Wang at the talks reportedly selling well. According to Christopher Marquis and Kunyuan Qiao, Yang's statement that his United States counterparts did "not have the qualification ... to speak to China from a position of strength" was celebrated by Chinese commentators as an example of China standing up to imperialists.

The Alaska meeting was followed two days later by a visit to China from Russian foreign minister Sergey Lavrov, which was widely viewed as a sign of strengthening Chinese–Russian relations. The visit, which the Chinese framed as a response to US "encirclement," included a discussion of moving away from use of the US dollar in trade.

== See also ==
- China–United States relations
- Wolf warrior diplomacy
- Thought and Foreign policy of Xi Jinping
- Senior Dialogue, Strategic Economic Dialogue, U.S.–China Strategic and Economic Dialogue
