= United States–China security cooperation =

United States–China security cooperation refers to various projects, combined operations, communications, official dialogues, joint exchanges, and joint exercises, between agencies, groups, and individuals within the government of United States and the People's Republic of China, in a number of areas pertaining to global security, defense policy, and various forms of military and security cooperation.

As the biggest and second-biggest economies in the world, respectively, they possess a unique role in global society. The United States and China have promoted a number of joint efforts in various policy areas, but these security cooperations have largely ended since the beginning of U.S.-China strategic competition.

== Overview ==
The establishment of the U.S.–China Strategic and Economic Dialogue was announced on April 1, 2009, by President of the United States Barack Obama and General Secretary of the Chinese Communist Party Hu Jintao. The format was such that high-level representatives of both countries and their delegations will meet annually at capitals alternating between the two countries.

The upgraded mechanism replaced the former Senior Dialogue and Strategic Economic Dialogue, which started under the George W. Bush administration in 2006.

In 2014, China and the US were among 21 countries who signed an agreement to implement the Code for Unplanned Encounters at Sea. in order to foster improved communications and interactions between warships of different nations who may have encounters on the high seas.

In August 2017, a new agreement was signed by US and Chinese high-ranking officers, to foster a useful strategic communication process between the two militaries.

Since the overall deterioration of United States–China relations in 2018, the communication between the US military and its Chinese counterparts has basically stagnated. Although the Biden administration requested the establishment of a hotline, it was rejected by the Chinese side.

== Specific joint efforts and policy areas ==
=== Army ===
The US Army and People's Liberation Army regularly conduct joint army exercises to practice techniques for disaster rescue efforts, officially referred to as Humanitarian Aid and Disaster Relief (HADR). Starting in 2005, the two countries have conducted the annual Disaster Management Exchange, which consists of a substantive exchange of knowledge and techniques. This exercise has expanded and has been held in a number of different locations throughout the US and China.

In 2010, a Chinese Army delegation visited Fort Leonard Wood in the US, in order to learn about disaster rescue techniques. In 2011, a US Army delegation visited China for a 12-day visit, and toured numerous Chinese facilities. They met with officers of the Engineer Regiment, Chinese International Search and Rescue (CISAR), in western Beijing. They viewed numerous vehicles and facilities to be used for disaster rescue. In 2012, the exchange took place in several cities in China.

In 2013, a field exercise was added to the usual exchange of information, based on feedback stemming from the previous DME session in 2012. That year's conference included representatives from United States Army Pacific, Hawaii Army National Guard and Army Corps of Engineers along with representatives from the Federal Emergency Management Agency. In 2015, delegations from both countries met at Joint Base Lewis-McChord in Washington State, and exchanged information on various techniques for disaster preparation. This was the first time that Chinese troops have ever entered an American base in the continental USA.

In 2016, the joint exercises were held in China, involving around 200 soldiers from both countries. In 2017, the joint exercises were held in Portland, Oregon. In 2018 the US-China Disaster Management Exchange was held in Nanjing, China. In 2019, the exercises were held at Kilauea Military Camp and Kilauea Military Reservation, in Hawaii. The official U.S. Army Facebook page for this exercise indicated that Gen. Paul LaCamera, Commanding General, U.S. Army Pacific, had personally met with Maj. Gen. Xu Qiling, Commanding General Eastern Theater Command Army, Peoples Liberation Army.

At the 2019 exercise, one American officer, U.S. Army Pacific Deputy Commanding General-North, Maj. Gen. Daniel McDaniel, provided a cogent summary of why these exercises are needed:

"No one nation can do it all by itself. The best results, we know by experience, are achieved together..... It is not a question of if the U.S and China will be called upon for a disaster response, but when such a request will come. This exchange brings us together and it brings us together to learn how to work together, and with other nations to support such a request."

=== Navy ===
In 2014, CNO Jonathan Greenert met with Admiral Wu Shengli, Commander of the Chinese Navy five times, more than any other CNO in the past in a single year. Greenert said “I think he [Shengli] recognizes that a growing navy is also one that has to be responsible. We have to learn to coexist in the South China Sea, the East China Sea and everywhere...he believes that miscalculation is one of our threats and our fear is that we get kicked off into something we don’t want to.”

In early 2016, CNO John Richardson had direct talks with Shengli, including an open discussion of China's deployment on and around islands in the South China Sea. In July 2016, Richardson traveled to China to meet with Shengli.

==== Operations and exercises ====
In 2012, China was invited to observe the US Navy's annual RIMPAC exercise. In 2014, the People's Liberation Army Navy began to actively participate in this exercise.

In August 2013, US and Chinese forces performed joint exercises to practice techniques for boarding ships, and to counteract piracy at sea. The two forces practiced various naval roles such as visit, boarding, search and seizure (VBSS) techniques, live fire, and helicopter landings. At that time, China was not actively part of the international coalition to fight piracy, although it sent its own ships in its own efforts to fight piracy. Commodore Joseph Naman, commander of Destroyer Squadron 50, said that "If we can get [China] to be a part of the coalition task force, that would be an even more substantial step forward.”

In December 2014, the Chinese and US Navies held an anti-piracy exercise in the Gulf of Aden. This included utilization of the procedures dictated by the Code for Unplanned Encounters at Sea, an important international code of procedures for ship encounters.

In 2016, the Chinese Navy joined the US Navy's RIMPAC exercise again. At that exercise, China participated with 5 warships and 1,200 personnel.

=== Coast Guard ===
Since 1993, the US Coast Guard and the China Coast Guard have assigned detachments of officers to work aboard each other's vessels to assist in cracking down on illegal fisheries. In 2016, the Coast Guard Commandant stated this program was going well, with extensive contacts between the two services.

In 2012, enlisted personnel of the China Coast Guard trained alongside US Coast Guard personnel in search and rescue techniques.

=== Nuclear security ===
In July 2017, scientists from both countries worked together to modify a nuclear reactor in Ghana, in order to reconfigure it to use lower-grade uranium that is not suitable for use in building nuclear weapons. This is part of an ongoing effort by US and China to take similar actions for nuclear facilities around the world. Under the 2015 Iran nuclear deal, U.S. and Chinese scientists are reconfiguring a heavy water reactor in Iran, so that it cannot be used as a significant source of plutonium.

The nucleus of this team effort is the U.S.-China Arms Control Technical Exchange Program (ACE), which was created in 1994 with nuclear scientists from major weapon labs such as Los Alamos National Laboratory, and with China's Academy of Engineering Physics (CAEP) in southwest China.

=== Cyber-security ===
In October 2017, the US and China held the first meeting of an official joint effort to be known as Law Enforcement and Cyber Security Dialogue. This effort is intended to allow both countries to work together to address problems with hacking and to improve conditions for global computer security and cyber-security in general.

=== UN peacekeeping and global security ===
In September 2015, President Barack Obama hosted the U.S.-China Climate Leaders Summit in Los Angeles, California. During this summit meeting, China agreed to provide 8,000 soldiers for peacekeeping operations, $100 million in funding, and also agreed to train 2,000 foreign soldiers for the African Union stability forces.

== See also ==
- China–United States relations
- Combined operations

General items

- Air route authority between the United States and China
- Pivot to Asia
- Permanent normal trade relations
- United States-China Economic and Security Review Commission

Foreign policy issues and concerns

- Chimerica
- China as an emerging superpower
- China containment policy
- China Lobby
- Chinese intelligence operations in the United States
- Group of Two
- Strategic Economic Dialogue
- US-China strategic engagement
- U.S.–China Strategic and Economic Dialogue

History

- 1996 United States campaign finance controversy
- Cox Report
- Hainan Island incident
- Hu Na incident
- Nixon in China
- Ping-pong diplomacy
- Red Chinese Battle Plan
- U.S. immigration policy toward the People's Republic of China
- Chinatowns in the United States
