= Merritt T. Cooke Jr. =

American academic, diplomat

Terry Cooke
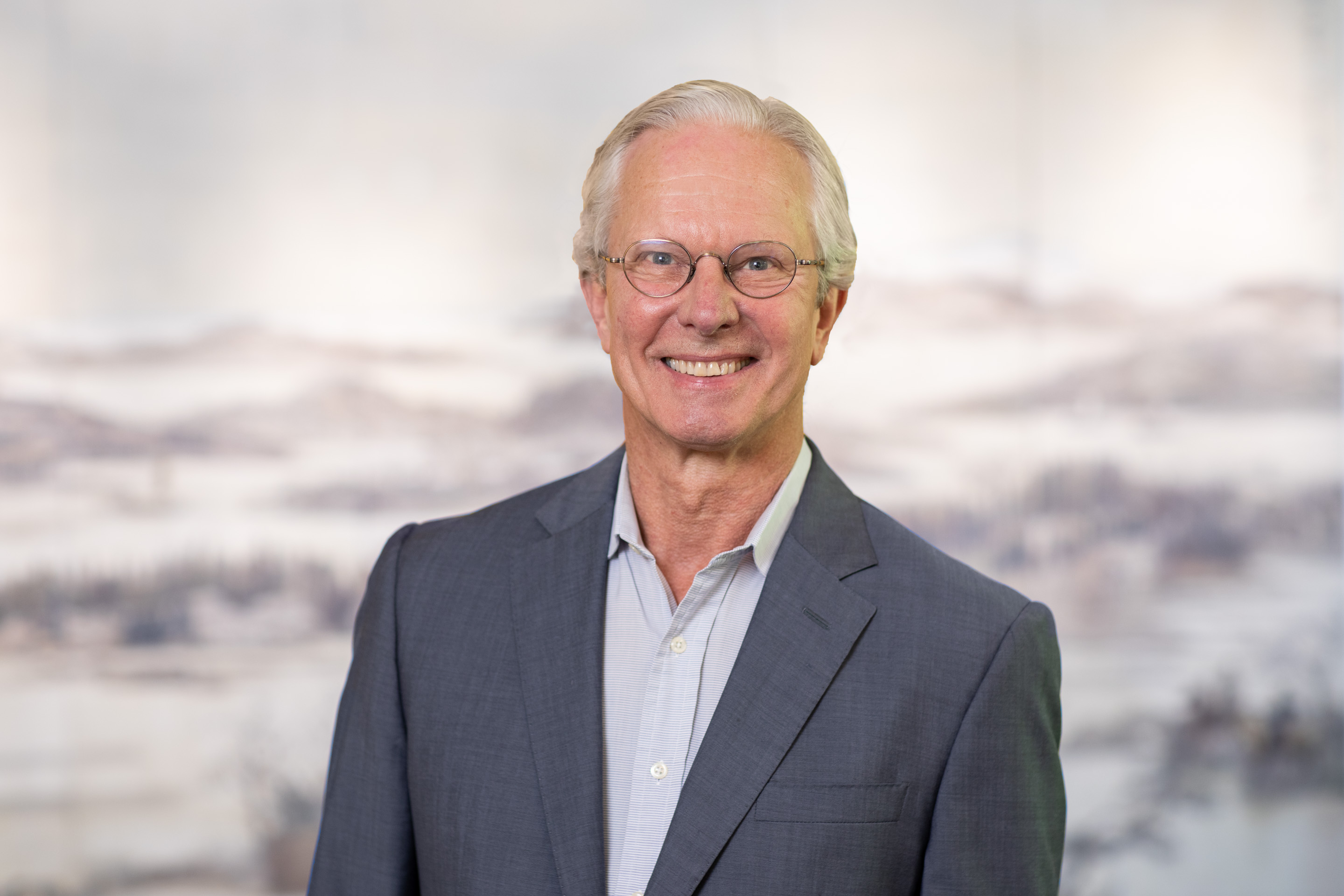
- Born: Merritt T. Cooke Jr.
- Education: Princeton University; University of California, Berkeley
- Occupations: Scholar; Diplomat; Author
- Known for: ReGen250
- Notable work: Sustaining U.S.-China Cooperation in Clean Energy; Introduction to the 2009 Private Equity in China (Tianjin Report)

Merritt T. Cooke Jr., also known as Terry Cooke, (Chinese: 古孟德,; pinyin: gu meng de) is an American scholar, diplomat, and author. He is the founder and president of ReGen250 which is known for its chapter China Partnership of Greater Philadelphia.

Cooke is known for his work on U.S.-China-Taiwan commercial interactions. As early as 2002, he was drawing attention to the issue of advanced semiconductor manufacturing in Taiwan and the vulnerability of global information and communications technology (ICT) supply chains. During the period 2010–2020, Terry led one of a small number of U.S.-China EcoPartnerships competitively selected by Washington and Beijing to support, at the sub-national level, the U.S.–China Strategic and Economic Dialogue and its Ten Year Framework for U.S.-China Cooperation on Energy & Environment.

For three years during the period 2016–2021, Terry taught a masters-level course at the University of Pennsylvania which used Mandarin primary-language sources to critically assess China's Belt and Road Initiative and which highlighted various sub-national initiatives supportive of COP21 Paris Accord climate change mitigation goals.

Cooke has previously served in Taipei, Berlin, Tokyo and Shanghai with the U.S. Senior Foreign Service.

== Early life and family ==
Terry received his early education from the Phillips Exeter Academy. He received his bachelor's degree from Princeton University in 1976. For a doctorate degree, he joined University of California, Berkeley where he earned his doctorate in cultural anthropology in 1985.

In 1986, he married Grace E. Sharples, a fashion editor of Glamour.

== Career ==
After the completion of his doctorate, Cooke started working as a research associate with University of California, Berkeley. Later, he became a visiting scholar at Columbia University.

Cooke has served as a career diplomat for fifteen years in which he was a senior U.S. official in Taipei, Berlin, Tokyo, and Shanghai. He retired from the U.S. Senior Foreign Service in 2003.

In 2010, he joined the Woodrow Wilson International Center for Scholars as a public policy scholar.

In 2011, he founded the China Partnership of Greater Philadelphia, an organization which promotes relations between the Greater Philadelphia region and China. They received prestigious U.S.-China EcoPartnership status from John Kerry and Yang Jiechi at U.S.–China Strategic and Economic Dialoguein 2014.

In 2012, his book, Sustaining U.S.-China Cooperation in Clean Energy, was published.

In 2016, he became an assistant director of the Fox Leadership Program at University of Pennsylvania. Cooke is the publisher of the TEA Collaboration which analyzes U.S.-China technology competition; energy and environment Cooperation; and ambitions of China's leadership.

== Publications ==
- Cooke Jr., Merritt T. (2012). Sustaining U.S.-China Cooperation in Clean Energy
- Introduction to the 2009 Private Equity in China (Tianjin Report)
