= Strategic Economic Dialogue =

SED superseded by S&ED

The Strategic Economic Dialogue (SED) was a framework for the United States and the People's Republic of China to discuss topics related to economic relations between them. The SED was initiated in 2006 by President of the United States George W. Bush and General Secretary of the Chinese Communist Party Hu Jintao. Top leaders of both countries would meet twice a year at locations alternating between China and the US. Five meetings were held between 2006 and 2008, after which the dialogue was upgraded by the administration of United States President Barack Obama, with the name U.S.–China Strategic and Economic Dialogue.

The SED enhanced the economic dialogue efforts which had been occurring since 1983 in the annual meetings of the Joint Commission on Commerce and Trade. SED became an important mechanism for addressing grievances and evaluating areas of cooperation. It was led jointly by the United States Treasury Secretary and the Chinese Vice Premier in charge of trade.

It had been described by a former U.S. Treasury official as "sort of like the G2". The SED was expanded to give the U.S. State Department a bigger role by the Presidency of Barack Obama, and renamed the U.S.-China Strategic and Economic Dialogue.

== Meetings ==
- First meeting: December 14–15, 2006 (Beijing)
- Second meeting: May 22–23, 2007 (Washington, DC)
- Third meeting: December 12–13, 2007 (Beijing)
- Fourth meeting: June 17–18, 2008 (Annapolis, MD)
- Fifth meeting: December 4–5, 2008 (Beijing)

== Representatives ==
- United States Secretary of the Treasury: Henry Paulson (2006–2009)
- Vice Premier of State Council of the People's Republic of China: Wu Yi (2006–2008)
- Vice Premier of State Council of the People's Republic of China: Wang Qishan (2008–2009)

== See also ==
- Sino-American relations
- Senior Dialogue
- Chinese Intelligence Operations in the United States
- US-China University Presidents Roundtable
