= Group of Two =

Informal grouping of the United States and China

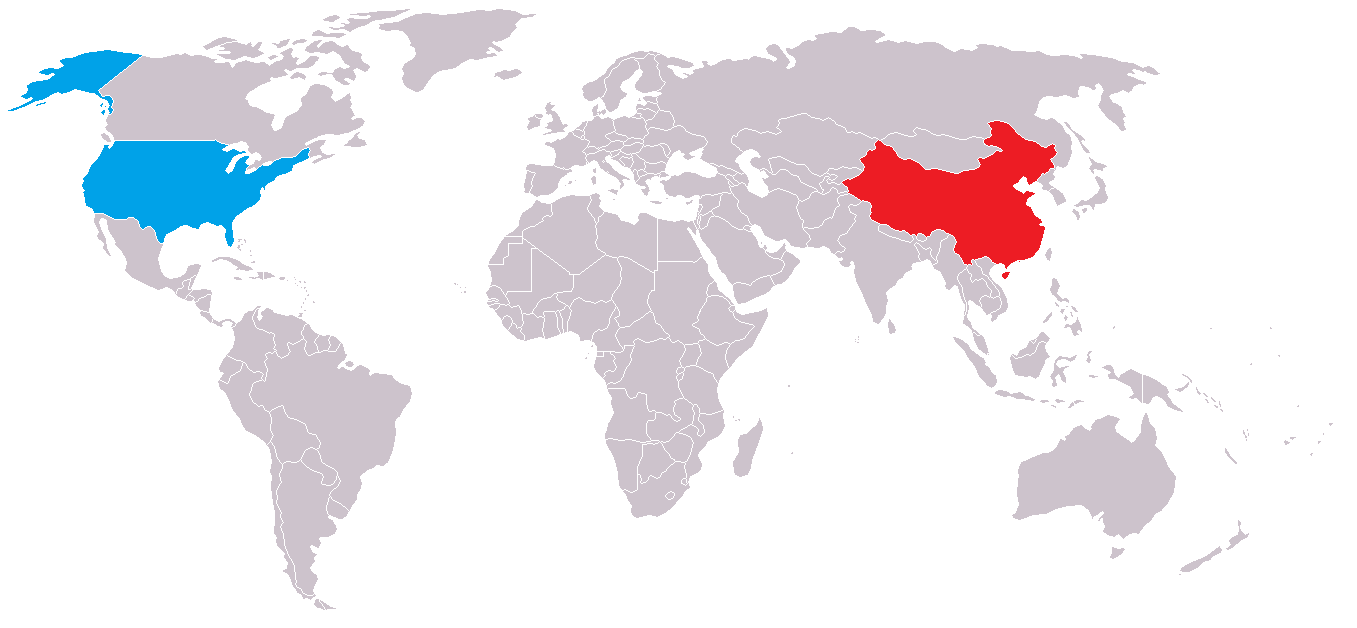
The United States and China.

The Group of Two (G-2 or G2) is a hypothetical and an informal grouping made up of the United States and the People's Republic of China first proposed by C. Fred Bergsten. As the concept gained more traction with members of the Obama administration and foreign policy establishment who came to recognize the increasing importance of the United States' relationship with China, its original economic focus became more all-encompassing.

U.S. President Donald Trump has become a vocal proponent of the G-2 concept during his current second term. Other prominent advocates of the grouping have included former national security advisor Zbigniew Brzezinski, historian Niall Ferguson, former World Bank president Robert Zoellick, and former chief economist Justin Yifu Lin.

There have been increasingly strong suggestions by American liberal politicians in creating a G-2 relationship to work out solutions to global problems, and prevent another cold war. However, as strategic competition between the two powers has intensified, some have also rejected the concept. As of 2026, these two countries collectively comprise about 42% of the global economy by GDP (nominal) and 34% by GDP at purchasing power parity.

== History ==
The concept of a G-2 was first raised by noted economist C. Fred Bergsten in 2005. In 2009, Bergsten made the following arguments for such a relationship:

- China will shortly pass Japan to become the world's second largest economy behind the United States;
- the two together accounted for almost one half of all global growth during the four-year boom prior to the crisis;
- they are the two largest economies;
- they are the two largest trading nations;
- they are the two largest polluters;
- they are on opposite ends of the world's largest trade and financial imbalance: the United States is the largest deficit and debtor country while China is the largest surplus country and holder of dollar reserves;
- they are the leaders of the two groups, the high-income industrialized countries and the emerging markets/developing nations, that each now account for about one half of global output.

Zbigniew Brzezinski had been a vocal advocate for the concept. He publicly advanced the notion in Beijing in January 2009 as the two countries celebrated the 30th anniversary of establishing formal diplomatic ties. He views the informal G-2 as helpful in finding solutions to the 2008 financial crisis, climate change (see Politics of climate change), North Korea's and Iran's nuclear programs, the Indo-Pakistani wars and conflicts, the Israeli–Palestinian conflict, United Nations peacekeeping, nuclear proliferation and disarmament. He called the principle of "harmony" a "mission worthy of the two countries with the most extraordinary potential for shaping our collective future".

Historian Niall Ferguson has also advocated the G-2 concept. He coined the term Chimerica to describe the symbiotic nature of the U.S.–China economic relationship.

Robert Zoellick, former president of the World Bank Group, and Justin Yifu Lin, the group's former chief economist and senior vice president, have stated that the G-2 is crucial for economic recovery and that the U.S. and China must work together. They state that "without a strong G-2, the G-20 will disappoint".

While widely discussed, the concept of a G-2 has not been fully defined. According to Brzezinski, G-2 described the current realities, while for former British Foreign Secretary David Miliband, a G-2 could emerge in the foreseeable future. Miliband proposes EU integration as a means to create a potential G-3 that consists of the United States, China and the European Union.

Former President Barack Obama and former United States Secretary of State Hillary Clinton have been very supportive of good relations between the two countries and more cooperation on more issues more often. Former Secretary of State Henry Kissinger has stated that U.S.–China relationship should be "taken to a new level". Some experts have disagreed with the effectiveness of a G-2. However, Clinton has said that there is no G-2.

In 2023, it was reported by Nikkei Asia that General Secretary of the Chinese Communist Party Xi Jinping drew on the idea of G-2 as a way to manage his country's relations with the U.S.

On October 30, 2025, U.S. President Donald Trump referred to a meeting between him and Xi as the G-2, posting "THE G2 WILL BE CONVENING SHORTLY!". On November 1, 2025, Trump posted "My G2 meeting with President Xi of China was a great one for both of our countries. This meeting will lead to everlasting peace and success. God bless both China and the USA!" On the same day, United States Secretary of Defense Pete Hegseth posted "As President Trump said, his historic 'G2 meeting' set the tone for everlasting peace and success for the U.S. and China."

In September 2026, Donald Trump and Xi Jinping discussed artificial intelligence during Xi Jinping's White House meeting. Xi said that China and the United States could cooperate on AI despite competition, including through dialogue on its risks and benefits and efforts to prevent its misuse, while Trump called for continued dialogue and stronger bilateral cooperation on AI.The discussions took place as the United Nations faced a continuing financial and liquidity crisis. The UN attributed the liquidity problem in part to delays and shortfalls in member states' assessed contributions, which affected the organization's ability to fully implement its approved budget and operations, including peacekeeping.

== Current leaders ==
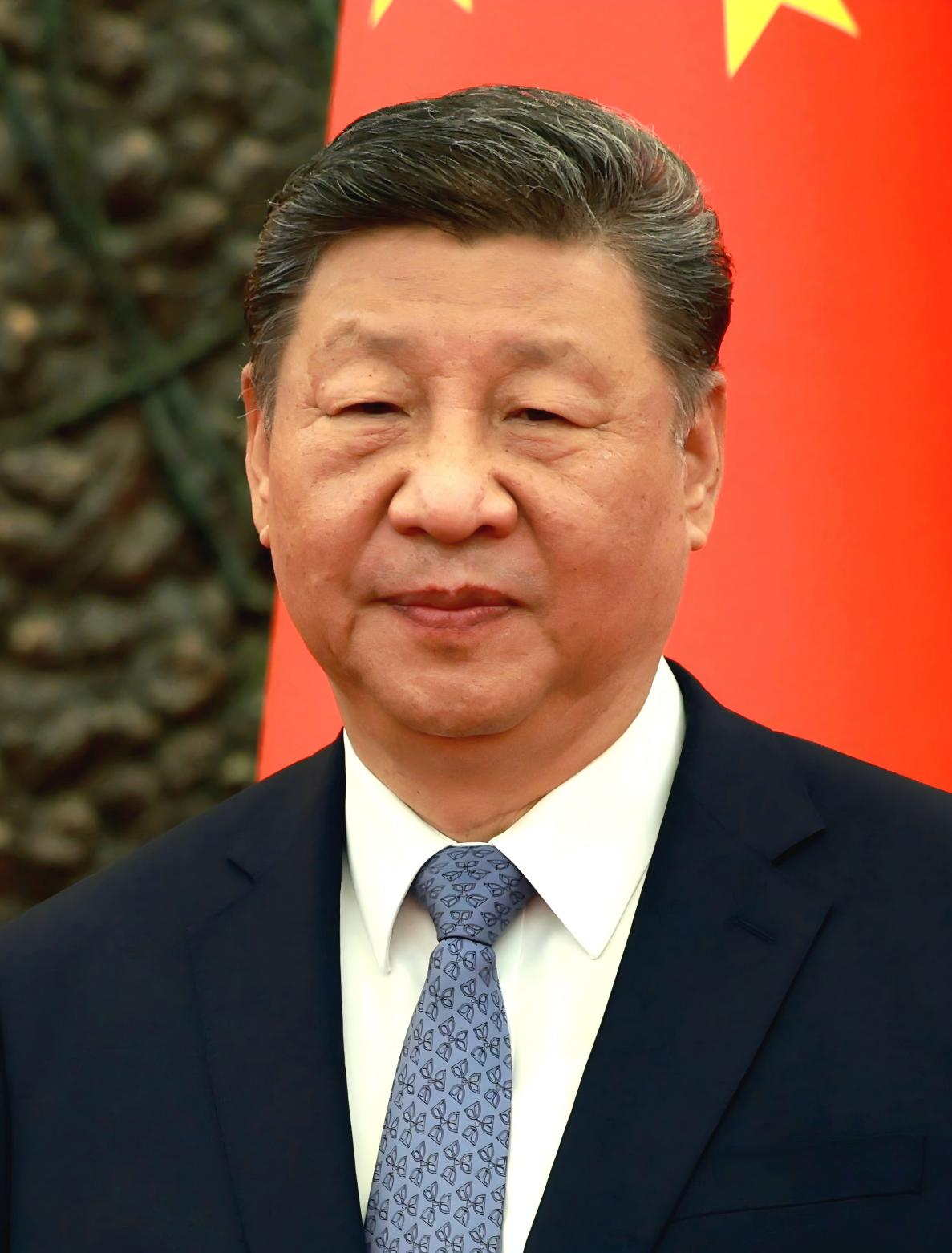
China
Xi Jinping,
CCP General Secretary

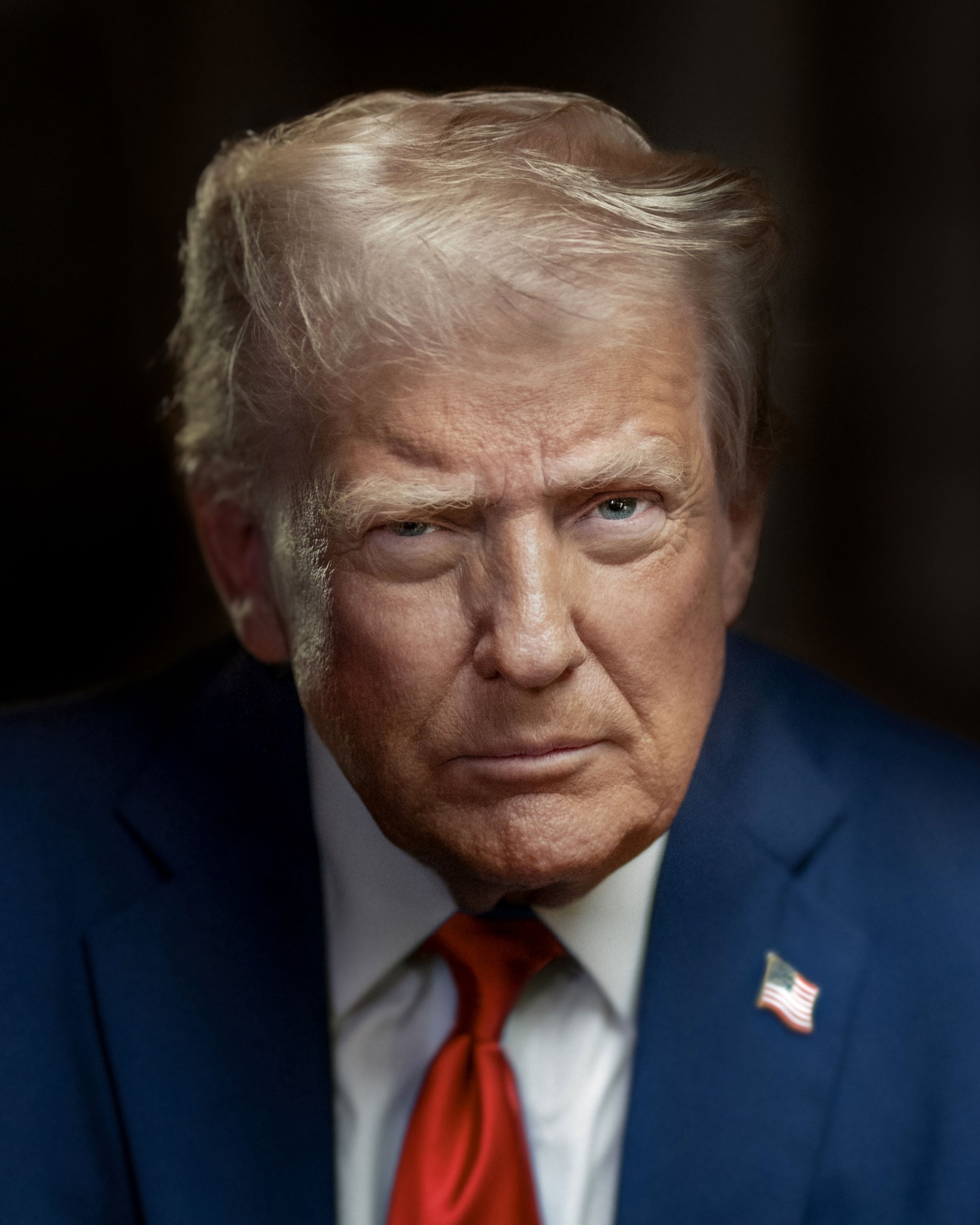
United States
Donald Trump,
President

== See also ==
- United States–China security cooperation
- U.S.–China Strategic and Economic Dialogue
- G7
- G20
- Constructive Strategic and Stable Relationship
