= Li Kemu =

Li Kemu (Chinese: 李克穆) (born July 1952) is a Chinese political figure and economist that is the Vice Chairman of the China Insurance Regulatory Commission. He is a research fellow and a doctoral supervisor.

== Biography ==
Li Kemu was born in July 1952. He began working in 1969 as an employee at a farm and factory. He subsequently joined the Dongcheng District Development Planning Commission in 1974. In 1982, he joined the Central Institute of Cameralistics and Finance. Li graduated from the Central College of Finance in 1982 and later taught at the institution. He served as a fellow of the Development Research Center of the State Council in 1984 and has occupied the posts of director general's secretary, section chief, vice director, editor in chief, director and member of the Party Group. He also worked with a company in Hong Kong during his tenure. In June 1998, Li was appointed as deputy director of the Central Financial and Economic Leading Group and headed the Team of Macro-Economy.

Li has been involved in the macro-economy research, particularly in the research of reform and development of financial industry and has written books on macroeconomic studies.
