= U.S.–China Strategic and Economic Dialogue =

2009–2017 China-United States dialogue mechanism

The U.S.–China Strategic and Economic Dialogue (S&ED) (simplified Chinese: 中美战略与经济对话; traditional Chinese: 中美戰略與經濟對話; pinyin: Zhōng Měi zhànlüè yǔ jīngjì duìhuà) was a high-level dialogue for the United States and China to discuss a wide range of regional and global strategic and economic issues between both countries. The establishment of the S&ED was announced on April 1, 2009, by U.S. President Barack Obama and General Secretary of the Chinese Communist Party Hu Jintao. The upgraded mechanism replaced the former Senior Dialogue and Strategic Economic Dialogue started under the George W. Bush administration. High-level representatives of both countries and their delegations met annually alternating between the two countries' capitals.

The S&ED was renamed the Comprehensive Economic Dialogue in June 2017. The Trump administration terminated the dialogue that year.

== History ==
The creation of the S&ED was announced on April 1, 2009, in London at the G-20 summit by President Barack Obama and Chinese leader Hu Jintao during their first meeting. The upgraded mechanism replaced the former Senior Dialogue and Strategic Economic Dialogue started under the George W. Bush administration. High-level representatives of both countries and their delegations meet annually at capitals alternating between the two countries. The first meeting was held in Washington, D.C. on July 27–28, 2009.

It has been suggested by analysts and media that the S&ED constitutes an important part of the G-2 relationship between the United States and China.

The administration of United States President Donald Trump renamed S&ED as the Comprehensive Economic Dialogue in June 2017. Trump's advisors Steve Bannon, Peter Navarro, and Matt Pottinger advised against continuing the dialogue. According to David Shambaugh, China, in the opinion of the administration, viewed the discussions as fig leaves for it increase its national power. One meeting occurred, and the Trump administration canceled the dialogue that year.

== Purpose ==
The S&ED attempted to address the challenges and opportunities that the United States and China face on a wide range of regional and global areas of immediate and long-term strategic and economic interests. Both President Barack Obama of the U.S. and Chinese leader Hu Jintao placed the S&ED at the center of the bilateral relationship and sought to deliver concrete, meaningful, and sustained progress over time on long-term strategic and economic objectives through the S&ED.

The S&ED has allowed the Secretary of Treasury and Secretary of State to meet directly with their more powerful counterparts; China traditionally considers American cabinet secretaries equal to Chinese ministers, rather than the more senior state councilors and vice premiers.

== Structure ==
The S&ED was organized around a high-level, cross-cutting structure that addresses the geopolitical nature of mutual concerns in strategic and economic discussions. The S&ED provided a forum for ongoing and productive bilateral engagement between U.S. and Chinese officials with diverse responsibilities for both economic and strategic issues. The structure of the S&ED allowed for a plenary session to discuss issues of cross-cutting strategic and economic importance, while maintaining distinct strategic and economic tracks. Each respective track involved focused discussions on issues of mutual immediate and long-term strategic or economic interest. The S&ED will meet semi-annually to facilitate robust engagement and progress between dialogues through coordination with existing bilateral dialogues and working-level interactions.

== Participants ==
The S&ED brought together senior leadership representing the U.S. and Chinese governments. Special representatives were appointed by Presidents of both countries.

=== Special representatives ===
Strategic Track

- United States Secretary of State: John Kerry
- State Councilor of the People's Republic of China: Dai Bingguo

Economic Track

- United States Secretary of the Treasury: Jack Lew
- Vice Premier of the People's Republic of China: Wang Qishan

== First round meetings ==
The meetings for the first round of the dialogue took place July 27–28, 2009 in Washington, D.C.

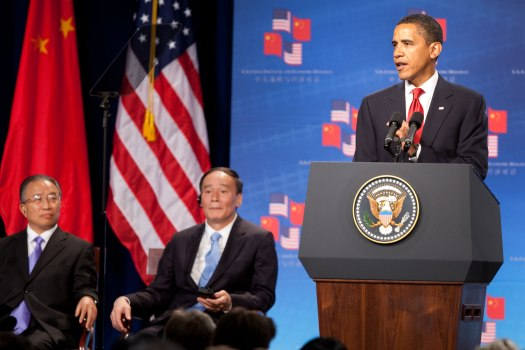
President Barack Obama addresses the opening session of the first U.S.–China Strategic and Economic Dialogue at the Ronald Reagan Building and International Trade Center in Washington, Monday, July 27, 2009. Listening at left are Chinese Vice Premier Wang Qishan, center, and Chinese State Councilor Dai Bingguo, left.

Vice Premier Wang Qishan held talks with Congressmen Rick Larsen and Mark Kirk, former U.S. Treasury Secretary Henry Paulson and Justin Yifu Lin, chief economist and senior vice president of the World Bank, on July 26, 2009, prior to the S&ED. Secretary of State Hillary Clinton hosted a dinner on July 26, 2009, for Chinese State Councilor Dai Bingguo. In an opinion piece published in The Wall Street Journal, Clinton and Timothy Geithner wrote about the U.S.–China relationship and the new S&ED. They added, "Simply put, few global problems can be solved by the U.S. or China alone. And few can be solved without the U.S. and China together", citing the "strength of the global economy, the health of the global environment, the stability of fragile states and the solution to nonproliferation challenges" as aspects that both countries have to cooperate on.

Hillary Clinton, Wang Qishan, Timothy Geithner, Dai Bingguo and President Obama addressed the opening ceremony of the first S&ED on July 27, 2009. Hu Jintao sent a congratulatory message read out by Wang. Obama said in his speech, "The relationship between the United States and China will shape the 21st century, which makes it as important as any bilateral relationship in the world. That really must underpin our partnership. That is the responsibility that together we bear." The opening ceremony of the first Dialogue was held in the Ronald Reagan Building and International Trade Center.

The agenda included the global economic interest, North Korean nuclear weapons production and proliferation, climate change, and overseas development assistance. Chinese participants met with and were addressed by President Barack Obama and spent some time on Capitol Hill meeting with members. They also met with Vice President Joe Biden. China brought more than 150 senior officials, including 28 minister-level officials and nearly its whole Cabinet, one of the largest and highest-level official Chinese delegations ever to come to the U.S. Chinese central banker Zhou Xiaochuan, Chinese Finance Minister Xie Xuren, the Chinese head of the banking regulatory commission, Liu Mingkang, and the head of securities regulatory commission, Shang Fulin, participated in the dialogue. China's Vice Foreign Minister Wang Guangya also participated.

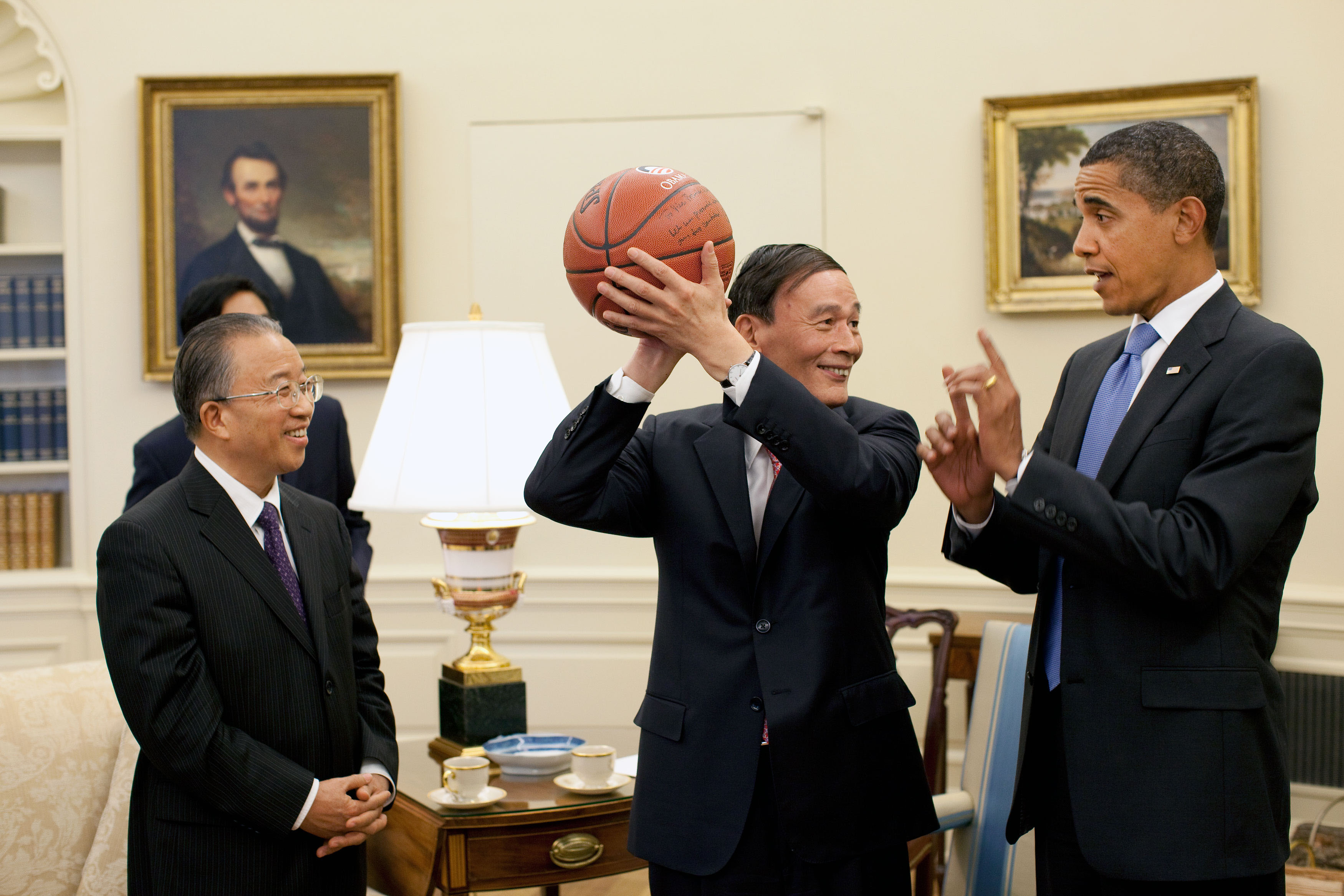
Chinese Vice Premier Wang Qishan, center, holds the autographed basketball given to him by President Barack Obama following their Oval Office meeting Tuesday, July 28, 2009, to discuss the outcomes of the first U.S.–China Strategic and Economic Dialogue. Looking on at left is Chinese State Councilor Dai Bingguo.

A legion of prominent personages took part on the U.S. side. For example, for climate change, Secretary of Energy Steven Chu, science adviser John Holdren, Carol Browner, Lisa Jackson from the U.S. Environmental Protection Agency (EPA) and others participated for the U.S. For the Chinese side, Vice-Minister Zhang Guobao of the powerful National Development and Reform Commission (NDRC) spoke on energy issues and NDRC Vice-Minister Xie Zhenhua talked about the substantial steps that China is taking to limit CO_{2} emissions.

In an effort to reassure the Chinese about their investment, Obama rolled out top officials to meet with Chinese representatives including Federal Reserve Chairman Ben Bernanke, National Economic Council Director Lawrence Summers and Peter Orszag, Obama's budget director, and U.S. Trade Representative Ron Kirk among others. Federal Reserve Chairman Bernanke briefed Chinese officials about how the U.S. plans to keep inflation in check over the next few years. U.S. Secretary of Labor Hilda Solis, U.S. Health and Human Services Secretary Kathleen Sebelius and U.S. Ambassador to the United Nations Susan Rice also participated in the Dialogue. The New York Times reported how 200 Chinese bankers, bureaucrats and policymakers scrutinized Obama's economic strategy and commented "how much the global financial crisis has changed the subtle balance of power in meetings of 'the G2'".

The U.S. and China also announced a resumption of routine military contacts and high-level visits by defense officials when Admiral Timothy Keating met with his Chinese counterpart during the dialogue.

On July 29, Wang Qishan met with Ben Bernanke and exchanged views on bilateral issues and other issues of mutual concern. Dai Bingguo had breakfast with a group of U.S. senators including Senator John Kerry and Senator Richard Lugar on Capitol Hill.

=== Highlights ===
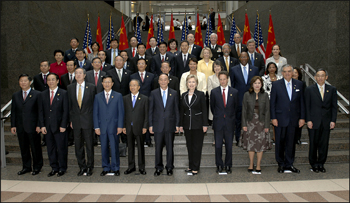
U.S. Secretary of State Hillary Clinton, Chinese State Councilor Dai Bingguo, U.S. Timothy Geithner, Chinese Vice Premier Wang Qishan and other participants of the U.S.–China Strategic and Economic Dialogue pose for a family photo on July 27, 2009.

==== Strategic Track ====
The Strategic Track of the S&ED consists of four pillars:

1. Bilateral relations (people-to-people exchanges);
2. International security issues (nonproliferation, counterterrorism);
3. Global issues (health, development, energy, global institutions);
4. Regional security and stability issues (Afghanistan/Pakistan, Iran, DPRK).

Climate change, clean energy, and the environment were also discussed in separate special sessions.

Key highlights from the Strategic Track include: Climate Change, Energy, and Environment MOU, North Korea, South Asia, Sudan, Counter-Terrorism, Non-proliferation, Military-to-Military Relations, Human Rights, Energy Security, and Global Issues.

=== Schedule ===
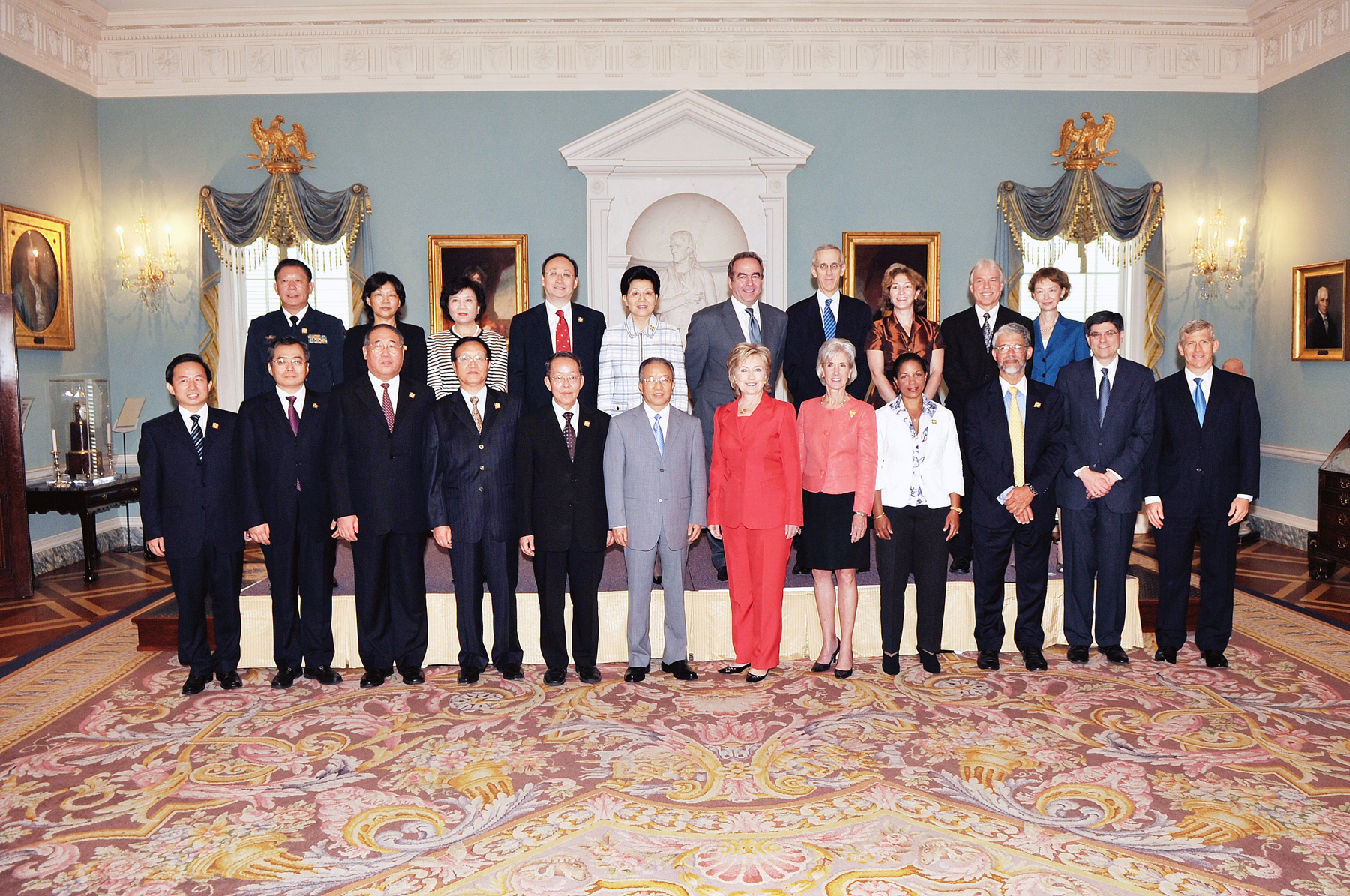
U.S. Secretary of State Hillary Rodham Clinton, Chinese State Councilor Dai Bingguo and other participants of the Strategic Track in the U.S.–China Strategic and Economic Dialogue pose for a family photo at the U.S. Department of State on July 28, 2009.

A schedule for the dialogue pertaining to the Strategic and Economic Track was arranged in advance and released by the U.S. Department of State and the U.S. Department of the Treasury respectively.

==== July 27 ====
- S&ED Family Photo
- S&ED Opening Ceremony
- Plenary Presentations of the S&ED
- Two-on-Two Meeting of the S&ED
- Plenary Luncheon for the S&ED
- Economic Track Family Photo
- Economic Track Principals Meeting
- Strategic Track Session I on Bilateral Relations
- Clinton and Dai Private Meeting
- Banquet Dinner for Participants of the S&ED hosted by Clinton

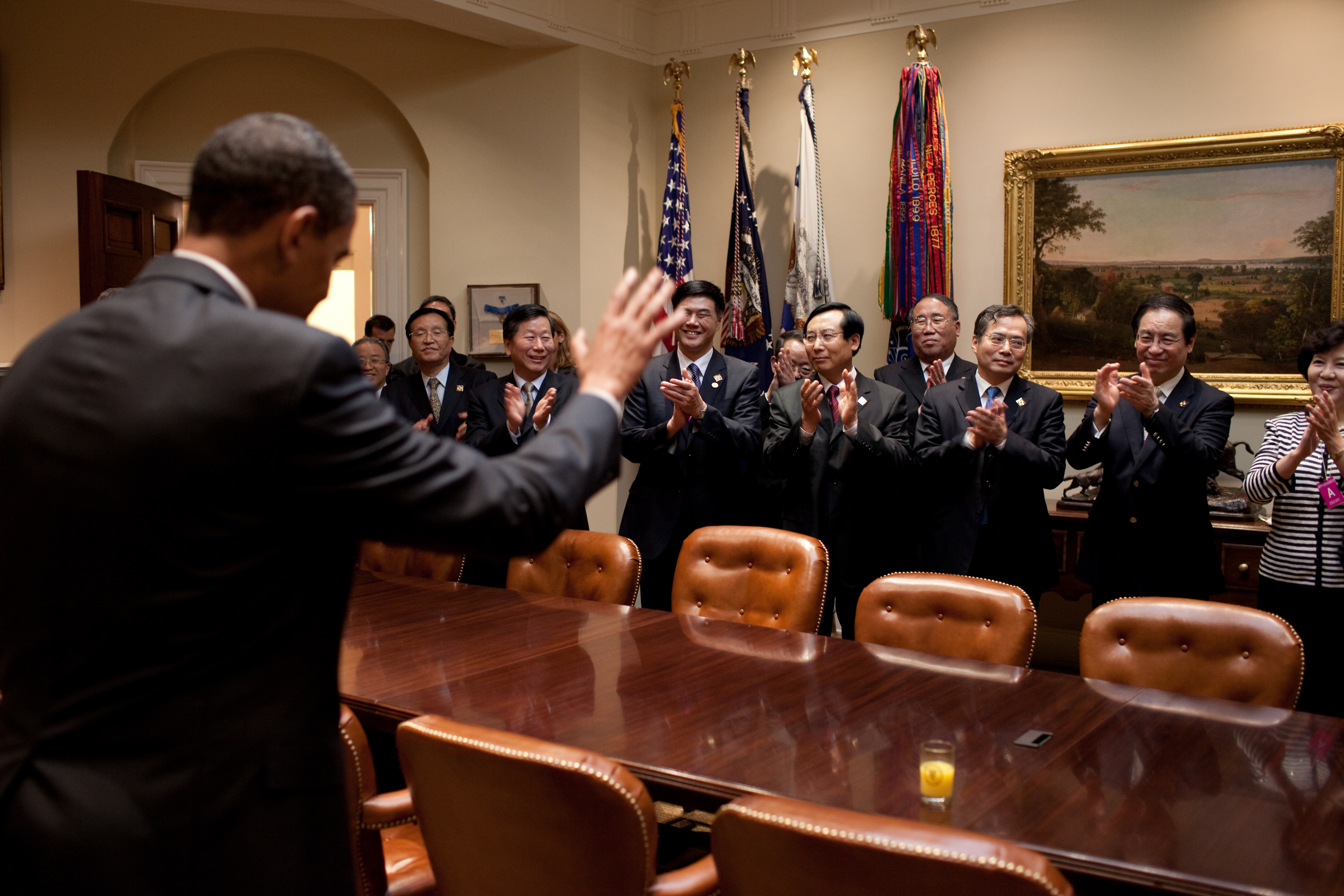
President Barack Obama bids farewell to Chinese Ministers in the Roosevelt Room of the White House after the first U.S.-China Strategic and Economic Dialogue on July 28, 2009.

==== July 28 ====
- Strategic Track Family Photo
- Strategic Track Session II on Global Issues
- Economic Track Opening Session
- MOU Signing
- Strategic Track Discussion III
- Strategic Track Luncheon hosted by Clinton
- S&ED Co-Leads Meeting with President Obama at the White House
- S&ED Principals Meeting with President Obama at the White House
- U.S.–China Closing Statements
- U.S. Press Conference
- China Press Conference
- U.S.–China Business Council and National Committee on U.S.–China Relations Dinner

=== Participants ===
The first Dialogue provided an opportunity not only for the four co-chairs, Secretary of State Clinton and Secretary of the Treasury Geithner, Vice Premier Wang Qishan, and State Councilor Dai, but also for over 20 officials of Cabinet-rank from each side to meet face-to-face and to discuss a range of substantive issues.

==== Economic Track ====
As special representatives of President Barack Obama and Chinese leader Hu Jintao, U.S. Treasury Secretary Timothy Geithner and Chinese Vice Premier Wang Qishan were joined by many high-level officials for the Economic Track.

On the U.S. side, they were joined by the following Cabinet members and other senior officials:

- Secretary of Agriculture Thomas Vilsack
- Secretary of Labor Hilda Solis
- Secretary of Transportation Raymond LaHood
- Chair of the Council of Economic Advisors Christina Romer
- Director of Office of Management and Budget Peter Orszag
- U.S. Trade Representative Ronald Kirk
- Director of the National Economic Council and Assistant to the President for Economic Policy Lawrence Summers
- Chairman of the Federal Reserve Ben Bernanke
- Chair of the Federal Deposit Insurance Corporation Sheila Bair
- Chairman of the Securities and Exchange Commission Mary Schapiro
- Chairman of Commodity Futures Trading Commission Gary Gensler
- Chairman and President of the Export-Import Bank Fred Hochberg

On the Chinese side, they were joined by the following Ministers and other senior officials:

- Minister of Finance Xie Xuren
- Governor of the People's Bank of China Zhou Xiaochuan
- Chairman of the China Banking Regulatory Commission Liu Mingkang
- Chairman of the China Securities Regulatory Commission Chairman Shang Fulin
- Chinese Ambassador to the United States Zhou Wenzhong
- Deputy Secretary-General of the State Council Bi Jingquan
- Vice Minister of Foreign Affairs He Yafei
- Vice Minister of the National Development and Reform Commission Zhang Xiaoqiang
- Vice Minister of Human Resources and Social Security Wang Xiaochu
- Vice Minister of Transport Weng Mengyong
- Vice Minister of Agriculture Niu Dun
- Vice Minister of Commerce Ma Xiuhong
- Vice Minister of Health Yin Li
- Vice Chairman of the China Insurance Regulatory Commission Li Kemu
- President of the Export-Import Bank of China Li Ruogu

== Second round meetings ==
The meetings for the second round of the dialogue took place on May 24–25, 2010 in Beijing. Chinese leader Hu Jintao gave a speech on the opening ceremony in the Great Hall of the People. The dialogue was co-chaired by Hillary Clinton, Timothy Geithner, Wang Qishan and Dai Bingguo.

Before the dialogue, Hillary Clinton wrote an op-ed in the Global Times. Chinese Finance Minister Xie Xuren wrote a piece in the Washington Post.

=== Highlights ===
==== Strategic Track ====
The Strategic Track resulted in 26 concrete outcomes.

=== Participants ===
Over 200 senior U.S. officials arrived in Beijing for the meeting and a large delegation from China also participated. 15-18 U.S. cabinet officials and agency heads participated making it one of the largest U.S. delegation to travel to a foreign country.

==== Economic Track ====
As special representatives of President Barack Obama and Chinese leader Hu Jintao, U.S. Treasury Secretary Timothy Geithner and Chinese Vice Premier Wang Qishan were joined by many high-level officials for the Economic Track.

U.S. Participants:

- Secretary of the Treasury Tim Geithner
- U.S. Ambassador to China Jon Huntsman
- Secretary of Commerce Gary F. Locke
- Secretary of Health and Human Services Kathleen Sebelius
- U.S. Trade Representative Ronald Kirk
- Chair of the Council of Economic Advisors Christina Romer
- Director of the Office of Science & Technology Policy John P. Holdren
- Chairman of the Federal Reserve Ben Bernanke
- President of the U.S. Export-Import Bank Fred P. Hochberg
- Chairman of the Federal Deposit Insurance Corporation Sheila C. Bair
- Director of the U.S. Trade & Development Agency Leocadia Zak
- Administrator of the Energy Information Administration Richard Newell
- Under Secretary for International Affairs of the Department of Treasury Lael Brainard
- Under Secretary for Economic, Energy and Agricultural Affairs of the Department of State Robert D. Hormats
- Under Secretary for Farm and Foreign Agricultural Services of the Department of Agriculture Jim Miller
- Special Assistant to the President for International Economics and Senior Director of the National Security Council David Lipton
- Deputy Under Secretary for International Affairs, Department of Labor Sandra Polaski
- Assistant Secretary for Policy and International Affairs, Department of Energy David B. Sandalow
- Director of the Office of International Affairs of the Securities and Exchange Commission Ethiopis Tafara
- Director of the Office of International Affairs of the Commodity Futures Trading Commission Jacqueline Mesa
- Deputy Assistant Secretary of the Department of Transportation Susan McDermott
- Department of Justice Antitrust Division Economics Director of Enforcement Kenneth Heyer
- Iowa State Insurance Commissioner Susan Voss

Chinese Participants:

- Vice Premier Wang Qishan
- Minister of Finance Xie Xuren
- Minister of the National Development and Reform Commission Zhang Ping
- Minister of Commerce Chen Deming
- Minister of Health Chen Zhu
- Governor of the People's Bank of China Zhou Xiaochuan
- Minister of the General Administration of Quality Supervision, Inspection, and Quarantine Wang Yong
- Chairman of the China Banking Regulatory Commission Liu Mingkang
- Chairman of the China Securities Regulatory Commission Shang Fulin
- Chairman of the China Insurance Regulatory Commission Wu Dingfu
- Chinese Ambassador to the United States Zhang Yesui
- Deputy Secretary-General of the State Council Bi Jingquan
- Vice Minister of the Office of the Central Leading Group on Financial and Economic Affairs Leiu He
- Vice Minister of Foreign Affairs Cui Tiankai
- Vice Minister of the National Development and Reform Commission Zhang Xiaoqiang
- Vice Minister of Science and Technology Cao Jianlin
- Vice Minister of Industry and Information Technology Lou Qinjian
- Vice Minister of Finance Zhu Guangyao
- Vice Minister of Transport Xu Zuyuan
- Vice Minister of Agriculture Niu Dun
- Deputy Governor of the People's Bank of China Yi Gang
- Vice Minister of the General Administration of Customs Sun Yibiao
- Vice Minister of the Legislative Affairs Office of the State Council Yuan Shuhong
- President of the Export-Import Bank of China Li Ruogu

== Third round meetings ==
The third round the third round of China-US Strategic and Economic Dialogue (SED) were held from May 9 to 10, 2011 in Washington, US.

Vice Premier Wang Qishan and State Councilor Dai Bingguo who are special representatives of Chinese leader Hu Jintao and Secretary of State Hillary Clinton and Treasury Secretary Timothy Geithner who are special representative of US President Barack Obama co-chaired the SED and delivered speeches respectively. US Vice President Joe Biden also addressed the SED.

Officials from more than 20 Chinese government agencies also participated in the dialogue, including the Foreign Ministry, National Development and Reform Commission (NDRC), Ministry of Finance, Ministry of Commerce and the People's Bank of China.

=== Important Addresses ===
Vice Premier Wang Qishan said in his speech that History and reality both have shown and future will ultimately prove that no difficulty can ever stop the trend of cooperation between China and the US, in which we are full of confidence. Such confidence comes from the wide common interest between the two countries, from the common aspiration of the Chinese and the US people and from historic and philosophic thoughts. The two sides should take the opportunity of this round of SED to carefully implement the important consensus reached between the two heads of state, comprehensively deepen cooperation in the fields of trade and economy, investment, finance and infrastructure and boost the strong, sustained and balanced growth of their own economy and the world economy at large.

State Councilor Dai Bingguo said that China and the US launched a policy of "ping pong diplomacy" 40 years ago and that Dr. Henry Kissinger paid a secret visit to China. These positive developments culminated in the opening of China-US relations which had been closed for more than 20 years. Contemporaneously ,China-US Chinese leader Hu Jintao and President Obama, met in Washington in January, agreeing to establish and develop the cooperative partnership based on mutual respect and mutual benefit, setting out the direction for the future development of bilateral ties.

Secretary of State Hillary Clinton said that the third round of SED aims at strengthening the bilateral understanding and trust, in particular understanding each other's strategic purpose and common interest, avoiding misunderstanding and wrong judgment. The way the US and China jointly address regional and international challenges will determine the future of US-China relations as well as prosperity and peace in the world. The two countries should join hands to push forward their cooperative partnership.

Treasury Secretary Timothy Geithner said that the world economy was suffering from the heavy impact of financial crisis when the SED was initiated two years ago. With the concerted efforts of the US and China, the world has successfully stepped out of the crisis and resumed growth. But the US and China still face challenges. The US needs to consolidate the foundation of future economic growth, improve education, encourage innovation, increase investment and conduct financial reform. China needs to build a new growth mode, expand domestic demand and improve its market economy and financial system. The reforms of the US and China do not have any conflict but can help each other. The cooperation between the US and China is critical to the health and stability of the global economy and the two countries should cope with challenges together.

=== Highlights ===
==== U.S.-China Comprehensive Framework for Promoting Strong, Sustainable and Balanced Growth and Economic Cooperation ====
A framework of comprehensive economic cooperation (the Framework) was elaborated in the third round of S&ED.

The United States and China affirm that both countries will, based on common interest, promote more extensive economic cooperation, from a strategic, long-term, and overarching perspective, to work together to build a comprehensive and mutually beneficial economic partnership, add to prosperity and welfare in the two countries, and achieve strong, sustainable, and balanced growth of the world economy.

===== Outline of the Framework =====
I. Principles (Clause 1–4)

II. Deepen Macroeconomic Cooperation (Clause 5–7)

Both countries recognize the fundamental consistency between their goals to promote strong, sustainable, and balanced growth, and commit to further strengthen macroeconomic-policy communication and coordination.

III. Develop a More Balanced Trade and Investment Relationship(Clause 8–13)

The two countries recognize the importance of open trade and investment for promoting innovation, creating jobs, and boosting incomes and economic growth. The United States and China are committed to further expanding bilateral trade and investment, fostering more open trade and investment globally, and fighting against trade and investment protectionism.

IV. Deepen Cooperation in the Financial Sector (Clause 14–15)

The two countries pledge to further deepen bilateral and multilateral cooperation on financial sector development, investment, regulation, and supervision, and cooperate to support flows of productive capital into, and the efficiency and stability of, financial markets of both countries.

V. Strengthen Regional and International Economic Cooperation (Clause 16–20)

==== The Strategic Track ====
The two sides commented positively on the progress in U.S.-China relations since Chinese leader Hu Jintao’s state visit to the United States in January 2011, reaffirmed their commitment to the January 19, 2011 U.S.-China Joint Statement, and in accordance with the Joint Statement, committed to nurture and deepen bilateral strategic trust and work together to build a cooperative partnership based on mutual respect and mutual benefit. The discussions produced 48 specific outcomes.

===== Important Outcomes of the Strategic Track =====
I. Promoting High-level Exchanges (Outcome 1)

1. Decided to work together to make thorough preparations for bilateral high-level exchanges in coming months. Both Presidents look forward to meeting again this year. The two sides decided that upcoming meetings such as the G20 Summit, the East Asia Summit, and the U.S. - hosted APEC Leaders’ meeting provide further opportunities for high-level engagement. China welcomed Vice President Biden's upcoming visit to China. The United States welcomed a subsequent visit by Vice President Xi Jinping.

II. Bilateral Dialogues and Consultations (Outcome 2–17)

......

3. Acknowledged that the two sides share a wide range of common interests with a shared goal of maintaining peace, stability, and prosperity in the Asia-Pacific region, and decided to establish a U.S.-China consultation on the Asia-Pacific. The two sides intend to hold the first round at the earliest time this year.

......

7. Before the next round of the S&ED, decided to hold a new round of sub-dialogues on: policy planning, Africa, Latin America, South Asia and Central Asia, and to enhance bilateral coordination and cooperation on regional and international issues.

......

III. Addressing Regional and Global Challenges (Outcome 18–19)

IV. Enhancing U.S.-China Bilateral Cooperation (Outcome 20–30)

20. Decided to further deepen ongoing cooperation to combat corruption, including bribery of public officials, through bilateral and multilateral fora, including the U.S.-China Joint Liaison Group on Law Enforcement Cooperation (JLG), the APEC Anticorruption and Transparency Experts Working Group, the G20 Anticorruption Working Group, the United Nations Anticorruption Convention as well as other multilateral frameworks. China expressed support for the APEC Anticorruption Task Force meetings to be hosted by the United States during its chairmanship of APEC 2011.

......

24. Continue to periodically exchange visits of maritime officials and welcome visits of each other's maritime law enforcement vessels. The U.S. Coast Guard's Pacific Area Commander, Vice Admiral Manson Brown, intends to visit China May 29 to June 4 and meet with representatives of several Chinese agencies supporting maritime governance.

......

V. Cooperation on Climate Change, Energy and Environment (Outcome 31–43)

VI. Documents to be Signed and/or Renewed (Outcome 44–48)

47. Signed the Memorandum of Understanding Regarding Cooperation in Law Enforcement Matters between U.S. Customs and Border Protection and the International Cooperation Department of the Chinese Ministry of Public Security.

VII. Breakout Sessions and Other Meetings

Held breakout sessions on UN peacekeeping, Sudan, law enforcement cooperation, climate change, de-mining and conventional weapons destruction, as well as electronics stewardship, and conducted a series of bilateral meetings between senior officials on a broad range of issues covering the entire strategic track of the U.S.-China relationship.

==== The Economic Track ====
===== Participants in the Economic Track of the Third Strategic and Economic Dialogue =====
U.S. Participants:

1. Timothy F. Geithner, Secretary of the Treasury

2. Thomas Vilsack, Secretary of Agriculture

3. Gary F. Locke, Secretary of Commerce

4. Hilda L. Solis, Secretary of Labor

5. Steven Chu, Secretary of Energy

6. Jacob J. Lew, Director of the Office of Management and Budget

7. Ronald Kirk, U.S. Trade Representative

8. Austen Goolsbee, chair, Council of Economic Advisors

9. John P. Holdren, Director, Office of Science & Technology Policy

10. Gene Sperling, Director of the National Economic Council

11. Ron Bloom, Assistant to the President for Manufacturing Policy

12. Ben Bernanke, Chairman of the Federal Reserve

13. Sheila C. Bair, Chairman of the Federal Deposit Insurance Corporation

14. Mary Schapiro, Chairman of the Securities and Exchange Commission

15. Gary Gensler, Chairman of Commodity and Futures Trading Commission

16. Fred P. Hochberg, President of the U.S. Export-Import Bank

17. Leocadia Zak, Director, U.S. Trade & Development Agency

18. Lael Brainard, Department of Treasury, Under Secretary for International Affairs

19. Demetrios Marantis, Deputy United States Trade Representative

20. Robert Hormats, Department of State, Under Secretary for Economic, Energy, and Agricultural Affairs

21. Francisco Sanchez, Department of Commerce, Under Secretary for International Trade

22. Eric Hirschhorn, Department of Commerce, Under Secretary, Bureau of Industry and Security

23. Sandra Polaski, Deputy Under Secretary, Department of Labor

24. Charles Collyns, Department of Treasury, Assistant Secretary for International Finance

25. David Sandalow, Department of Energy, Assistant Secretary for International Affairs

26. Mike Froman, Deputy National Security Advisor for International Economic Affairs

27. David Lipton, Special Assistant to the President and Senior Director for International Economic Affairs, NSC

28. Chris Ledoux, Federal Insurance Office, Acting Director

29. Susan Voss, Iowa State Insurance Commissioner

Chinese Participants:

1. Vice Premier Wang Qishan

2. Minister of Finance Xie Xuren

3. Minister of Science and Technology Wan Gang

4. Minister of Commerce Chen Deming

5. Governor of the People's Bank of China Zhou Xiaochuan

6. Chairman of the China Banking Regulatory Commission Liu Mingkang

7. Chairman of the China Securities Regulatory Commission Shang Fulin

8. Chairman of the China Insurance Regulatory Commission Wu Dingfu

9. Chinese Ambassador to the United States Zhang Yesui

10. Vice Secretary General of State Council Bi Jingquan

11. Vice Minister of Foreign Affairs Cui Tiankai

12. Vice Chairman of the National Development and Reform Commission Zhang Xiaoqiang

13. Vice Chairman of the National Development and Reform Commission Liu Tienan

14. Vice Minister of Finance Zhu Guangyao

15. Vice Minister of Human Resources and Social Security Wang Xiaochu

16. Vice Minister of Railways Wang Zhiguo

17. Vice Minister of Agriculture Niu Dun

18. Vice Minister of Health Yin Li

19. Deputy Governor of the People's Bank of China Yi Gang

20. Vice Chairman of the State-owned Assets Supervision and Administration Commission Huang Shuhe

21. Chief Engineer of the Ministry of Industry and Information Technology Zhu Hongren

22. Director-General of the Department of Secretary and Administration of State Council Legislative Affairs Office Hu Keming

===== Joint U.S.-China Economic Track Fact Sheet (Excerpt) =====
I. Promoting Strong, Sustainable and Balanced Growth

......

In order to promote a more balanced trade relationship, China will continue to take steps to expand domestic consumption and imports in accordance with the 12th Five-Year Plan; and the United States will increase domestic savings and exports, including through the National Export Initiative. China takes promotion of employment as the priority objective for economic development, and strives to achieve full employment. China strives to raise the proportion of residents’ income in gross national income, increase the proportion of wages in the primary income distribution, and realize the increase of people's income in line with economic development and the increase of workers’ pay in line with gains in labor productivity. China's minimum wage has steadily increased in recent years and will continue to do so in the future. China will raise the ratio of services value-added to Gross Domestic Product (GDP) by four percentage points over the next five years, with measures to develop the services sector including expanding areas open to foreign involvement, encouraging and guiding a variety of categories of capital into the services sector, and actively developing services enterprises with diversified forms of ownership.

The U.S. economy is rebalancing toward sustainable growth, emphasizing higher domestic savings, a commitment to improving long-term fiscal sustainability and productivity-enhancing investments. The personal savings rate was 5.8 percent in 2010, which is the highest rate since 1993 and well above the 2.7 percent average between 2000 and 2007. Thus, much of the transition on the private side to higher saving has already taken place. To increase public saving, the President's Budget freezes discretionary spending for five years, freezes government salaries for two years, and brings the deficit to three percent of GDP by the second half of this decade – a path consistent with the Administration's commitments to cut the deficit in half by 2013, and to stabilize or reduce the national debt as a share of the economy. To lay the foundation for future growth, including through greater U.S. exports, the United States will increase and improve investment in innovation, infrastructure, and education.

......

The two countries reiterate their support for the G-20 Framework for Strong, Sustainable, and Balanced Growth, and reaffirm their commitments to improve the living standards of our citizens through strong economic and jobs growth, and use the full range of policies required to strengthen the global recovery and to reduce excessive external imbalances and maintain current account imbalances at sustainable levels. The two sides support a bigger role for the G-20 in international economic and financial affairs, and pledge to strengthen communication and coordination to follow through on the commitments of the G-20 summits and push for positive outcomes at the Cannes summit in November.

......

II. Strengthening Financial Systems and Improving Financial Supervision

The two countries reaffirmed their commitment to deepen bilateral and multilateral cooperation on financial sector investment and regulation, in order to enhance global regulation, establish stronger international coordination to prevent future crises, and ensure a level playing field. Recognizing the positive contributions that financial institutions from each country can play, the two sides pledged to support open environments for investment in financial services and cross-border portfolio investment, consistent with prudential and national security requirements.

The United States and China commit to further promote and strengthen financial sector reform. Following the passage of the Dodd-Frank Act, the United States is implementing comprehensive financial reform that better serves households, workers, entrepreneurs, and businesses by reducing systemic risk, raising prudential standards, establishing a comprehensive regulatory framework for derivatives, ending the problem of "too big to fail" financial institutions, creating a Federal Insurance Office, and ensuring robust consumer financial protection.

China will continue to deepen the reform of its financial system, which has supported the process of transforming its economic development model, developing a financial system that consists of diverse institutions, provides efficient service, controls risks, and encourages financial innovation. China will increase the use of direct financing channels, including stocks, bonds and private equity, to better satisfy the diverse demands in its economy for investment capital and financing. In accordance with the medium- and long-term development perspectives, China will push forward the market-based reform of interest rates.

......

The United States and China committed to further strengthen their respective financial systems against money laundering, counterfeiting, terrorism financing, and WMD proliferation financing activities. China will continue to develop and strengthen its regulatory framework for freezing terrorist assets. The two countries will continue to enhance both policy and operational cooperation on combating illicit finance. The two countries will also continue to work collaboratively in the freezing, seizing, and forfeiture of criminal proceeds. Both countries seek to rely on bilateral mutual legal assistance to implement forfeiture orders, and seek to avoid unilateral enforcement action of forfeiture orders to the extent possible.

III. Enhancing Trade and Investment Cooperation

The two countries, recognizing the importance of open trade and investment in fostering economic growth, job creation, innovation, and prosperity, re-affirmed their commitment to take further steps to liberalize global trade and investment, and to oppose all forms of trade and investment protectionism. The two sides reaffirmed their commitment to work proactively to resolve bilateral trade and investment disputes in a constructive, cooperative, and mutually beneficial manner.

China will take stock of the results of the Special Campaign against IPR Infringement and Fake and Shoddy Products (Special Campaign), and improve on the high-level, long-term mechanism of IPR protection and enforcement, building on the Special Campaign currently in place. China will strengthen the government inspection mechanism so as to make sure that the software being used by the government agencies at all levels is legitimate. China and the United States will strengthen cooperation in the JCCT IPR Working Group on software legalization.

......

China and the United States reaffirm their prior SED outcomes on transparency. The United States welcomes China's statement that it will issue a measure in 2011, to implement the requirement to publish all proposed trade- and economic-related administrative regulations and departmental rules on the SCLAO website for a public comment period of not less than 30 days from the date of publication, except as specified in China's Protocol of Accession to the WTO or in public emergency situations. China will steadily increase its solicitation of public opinions on regulatory documents with a direct influence on the rights and obligations of citizens, legal persons, or other organizations. China welcomes the United States’ commitment to implement measures in 2011, to enhance regulatory transparency, including by taking steps to ensure the online publication of the text of proposed regulations, as well as supporting technical and scientific information, at www.Regulations.gov for a public comment period of 60 days, and the United States’ decision to strengthen the Office of Management and Budget's participation in the ongoing Transparency Dialogue.

......

The United States and China agree on the importance of fostering an open, transparent and predictable investment climate. The United States and China affirm that the enforcement policies of their national competition agencies are not to discriminate on the basis of nationality.

......

The Civil Aviation Authorities of the United States and China will strengthen communication and cooperation in the field of aircraft airworthiness certification, through currently established channels, in order to promote reciprocal acceptance of civil transport category airplanes.

== Fourth round meetings ==
The fourth round of meetings took place on May 3–4, 2012 in Beijing.

== Fifth round meetings ==
The fifth round of meetings took place on July 10–11, 2013, in Washington, D.C.

== Sixth round meetings ==
The sixth round of meetings took place on July 9–10, 2014 in Beijing.

== Seventh round ==
The seventh round of meetings took place between U.S. Treasury Secretary Jacob Lew and Vice-Premier Wang Yang on June 23–24, 2015 in Washington, D.C.

== Eighth round ==
The eight round of meetings took place between U.S. Treasury Secretary Jacob Lew and Vice-Premier Wang Yang on June 6–7, 2016 in Beijing.

== See also ==
- China-United States relations
- Group of Two
- Strategic Economic Dialogue
- Senior Dialogue
