= Zhang Xiaoqiang =

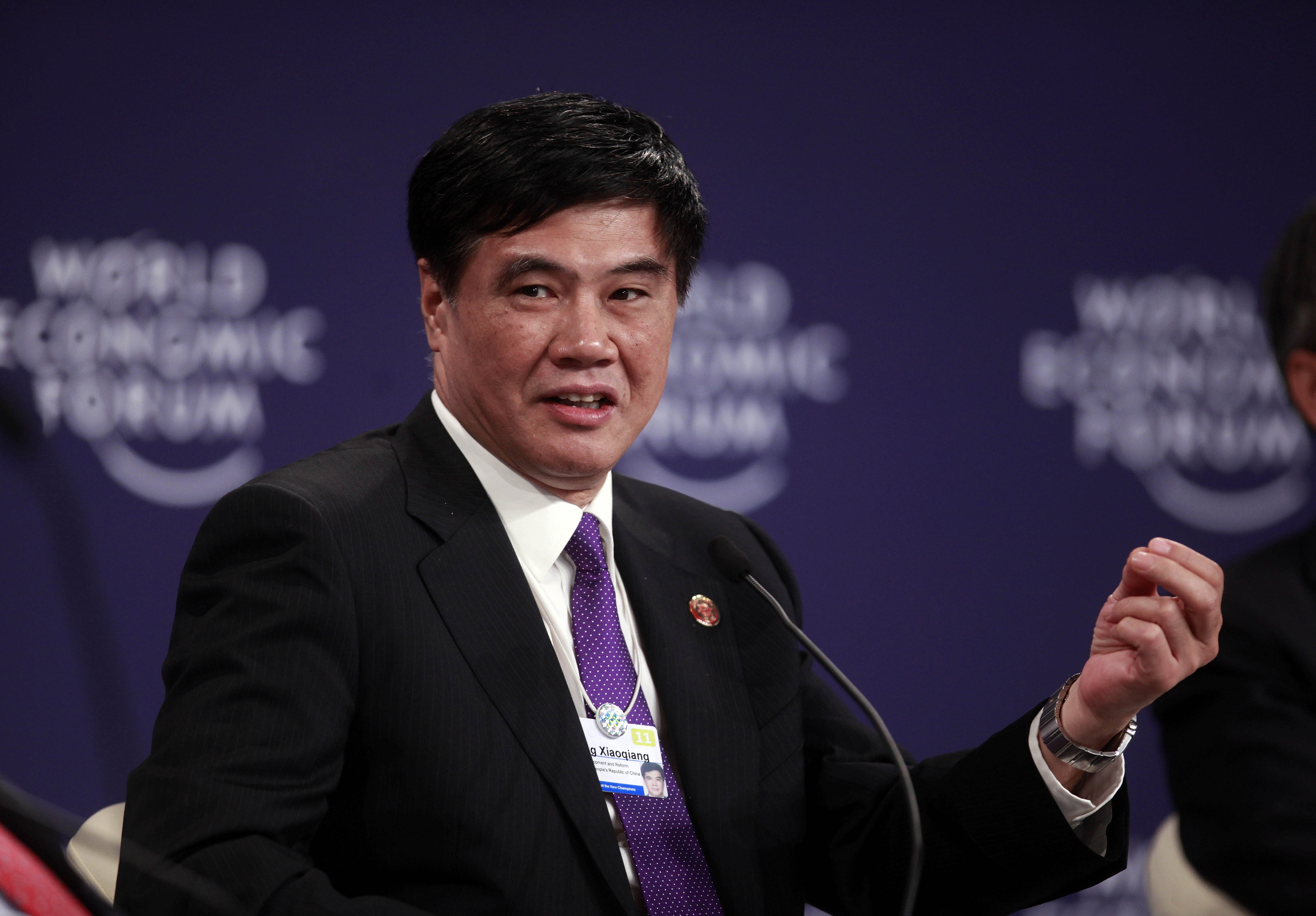

Zhang Xiaoqiang (Chinese: 张晓强; pinyin: Zhāng Xiǎoqiáng) (born 1952) is the vice-director of the Chinese National Development and Reform Commission.

== Biography ==
Zhang Xiaoqiang began to work in 1969, and graduated from the Economics Department of Peking University in 1982. Now he is Vice Minister and Member of Leading Party Members’ Group, in National Development and Reform Commission.
