= The Internationalists (book) =

2024 book by Alexander Ward

The Internationalists, The Fight to Restore American Foreign Policy After Trump
- First edition (US)
- Author: Alexander Ward
- Language: English
- Subject: Joe Biden's foreign policy team
- Published: February 20, 2024
- Publisher: Portfolio
- Publication place: United States
- Pages: 368
- ISBN: 978-0593539071

The Internationalists: The Fight to Restore American Foreign Policy After Trump is a book authored by Alexander Ward, a national security reporter.

== Overview ==
This book dates back to the time of Biden's presidency and contains stories from Biden's foreign policy team. The goal of this team has been to restore America's influence and power at home and abroad after Trump's presidency. The mission of team was to restore America's damaged reputation in the world. While Russia had started a war in the world and China was replacing America as the superior power, this team started working. After World War II, it was the first time that America was in a position of collapse. His enemies were consolidating their power and his allies were avoiding America. It is said that the defeat of this team is equal to the disruption of the world order.

In this book, the strengths and weaknesses of Biden's approach in foreign policy are pointed out. This book talks about the role of Biden's personal relationships in foreign policy. One of the chapters of the book deals with Israel-US relations and Biden's personal relations with Netanyahu and its effects on Hamas' conflicts with Israel in the last two years in detail.

== Author ==
Alexander Ward is a national security columnist. He reports the role of the White House in shaping and executing U.S. outside approach, and the powerful people in national security approach in Washington. Ward has won large number prizes for his reports. The POLITICO team has awarded the Pulitzer Prize as a finalist. Ward was a member of that team. He also is described as a "member of the Council on Foreign Relations".

== Content ==
The time frame that this book narrates is from the first two years of Biden's foreign policy team to April 2023 and Sullivan's speech. In other words, this book does not include the conflict between Hamas and Israel in 2023.This book is the story of a team that started its work with a lot of self-confidence, its self-confidence was weakened after leaving Afghanistan, and it regained its self-confidence by supporting Ukraine. The author narrates a different view of American foreign policy. This book actually includes the strengths and weaknesses of foreign policy advisors in America. The members of Biden's foreign policy team saw themselves as intelligent and idealistic people who wanted to end the war and repair America's ailing body at home and its damaged image abroad. But this did not come true and America entered into bigger wars. The author believes that this was a threat for Biden to hand over power to the next president.

Jake Sullivan and Antony Blinken, Secretary of Defense Lloyd Austin, Director of National Intelligence Avril Haines can be mentioned among the famous faces in Biden's foreign policy advisors team. The author has dedicated a large part of the book to Sullivan. It can be said that the first and last chapters are about this character. Although the national security adviser has the duty of advising the president, the author in his book describes the talents in Sullivan that prepare him for this position.

One of the actions of Biden's foreign policy team was to use a joint document to discredit Putin for starting Russia's war with Ukraine. Although this action did not stop the war, it was considered a successful tactic. The three important issues that the author has addressed are the withdrawal from Afghanistan, the Israeli-Palestinian war, and Russia's attack on Ukraine. In this book, he did not deal with issues such as China, climate change and immigration.
