= US-China University Presidents Roundtable =

US-China University Presidents Roundtable 中美高水平大学校长圆桌会议
- Status: Active
- Frequency: Biennial
- Country: United States; China
- Years active: 2013–present

The US-China University Presidents Roundtable (Chinese: 中美高水平大学校长圆桌会议) is a biennial international conference gathering of the presidents and chancellors from leading U.S. and Chinese universities.

== Roundtable 2013 ==
The first Presidents Roundtable was held at the University of Chicago on November 18, 2013.

=== Participant ===
==== United States ====
- University of Chicago
- Rice University
- California Institute of Technology
- University of Washington
- Washington University in St. Louis
- New York University
- Texas A&M University
- Duke University
- University of Notre Dame
- Colby College
- Fermi National Accelerator Laboratory

==== China ====
- Peking University
- East China Normal University
- Fudan University
- Shanghai Jiao Tong University
- Zhejiang University
- Wuhan University
- Sun Yat-sen University
- Chongqing University
- Sichuan University
- Xi'an Jiaotong University
- Jilin University

== Roundtable 2015 ==
In 2015 the Roundtable will be hosted at Rice University.
