= Senior Dialogue =

The U.S.-China Senior Dialogue (also known as the China-U.S. Strategic Dialogue) was a regular, high-level strategic dialogue between the United States and the People's Republic of China. The Senior Dialogue has been upgraded to the strategic track of the Strategic and Economic Dialogue in the Obama administration and will be headed by Hillary Clinton and Dai Bingguo.

== Purpose ==
The Senior Dialogue was conceived at a 2004 APEC meeting, after a suggestion made by General Secretary of the Chinese Communist Party Hu Jintao to U.S. President George H. W. Bush to create a forum where the global superpower and emerging global player could come together and discuss issues of mutual concern. The typically two-day rounds help establish a framework for bilateral cooperation between the two countries, and give the U.S. an opportunity to shape China's impact on the world as its economy continues to industrialize.

Integrating China into the world's security, economic and political systems continues to be the U.S.'s current policy in dealing with China's rise on the global sphere. However, China's current international economic policies are increasingly rankling American workers and businesses, among others around the world who consider China's trade practices unfair. On June 13, 2007, four U.S. senators introduced a bill that would pressure China to allow its currency to rise in value, which would help close the huge U.S. trade deficit with China, which hit a record $233 billion in 2006. However, Treasury Secretary Henry Paulson believes in pursuing a less confrontational and non-protectionist approach.

== Meetings ==
- 1st round: Beijing in August 2005
- 2nd round: Washington, D.C. in December 2005
- 3rd round: Beijing in October 2006
- 4th round: Washington, DC in June 2007
- 5th round: Guiyang in January 2008
- 6th round: Washington, DC in December 2008

=== 1st round ===
The first round, co-chaired by former Deputy Secretary of State Robert Zoellick and CCP foreign chief Dai Bingguo on August 1–2, 2005, addressed issues such as trade and economic issues, energy security, cooperation against terrorism, democracy, and human rights.

=== 2nd round ===
The second round took place three months later, on December 7–8, 2005, between Zoellick and Dai, and addressed Iraq, Afghanistan, Iran, North Korea, Africa, terrorism, non-proliferation of weapons of mass destruction, energy security, and the risks of pandemic disease. Human rights, democracy, and the U.S.-China trade imbalance were also discussed.

=== 3rd round ===
The third round of talks concluded on November 8, 2006, between former Undersecretary of State Nicholas Burns and Chinese Vice Foreign Minister Yang Jiechi. Issues of discussion included North Korea, Iran, Darfur, Burma, APEC, and UN reform.

=== 4th round ===
Chinese and U.S. diplomats met on June 20–21, 2007 in Washington, D.C. to convene the fourth round of the Senior Dialogue - bilateral talks between the U.S. and China ongoing since August 2005.

Senior Dialogue leaders Deputy Secretary of State John Negroponte and CCP foreign chief Dai Bingguo met in 2007 for closed-session talks to discuss U.S.-China relations, and a range of global issues from Northeast Asian regional security, to Iran and Darfur.

Before the fourth round of talks began, the two leaders warmly exchanged welcomes and hopes for an optimistic outcome.

"This is part of the Senior Dialogue between ourselves and China," Negroponte began. "It's the first one that I'm having an opportunity to lead from the United States side. We look very much forward to our discussions over the next day and I'm delighted to welcome my counterpart from China, Mr. Dai Bingguo here to the Department of State."

Dai thanked the mostly Asian news organizations in attendance before replying in Chinese, "Thank you for coming here today. This is also the first time that I will be meeting Mr. Negroponte and I hope we achieve a satisfactory result."

== See also ==
- Sino-American relations
- U.S.-China Strategic and Economic Dialogue
- Strategic Economic Dialogue
