= List of diplomatic missions of the United States =

American embassies, consulates, etc.

Diplomatic missions of the United States of America Countries that host a United States embassy Interests section and other representations Countries that do not host United States missions The United States of America

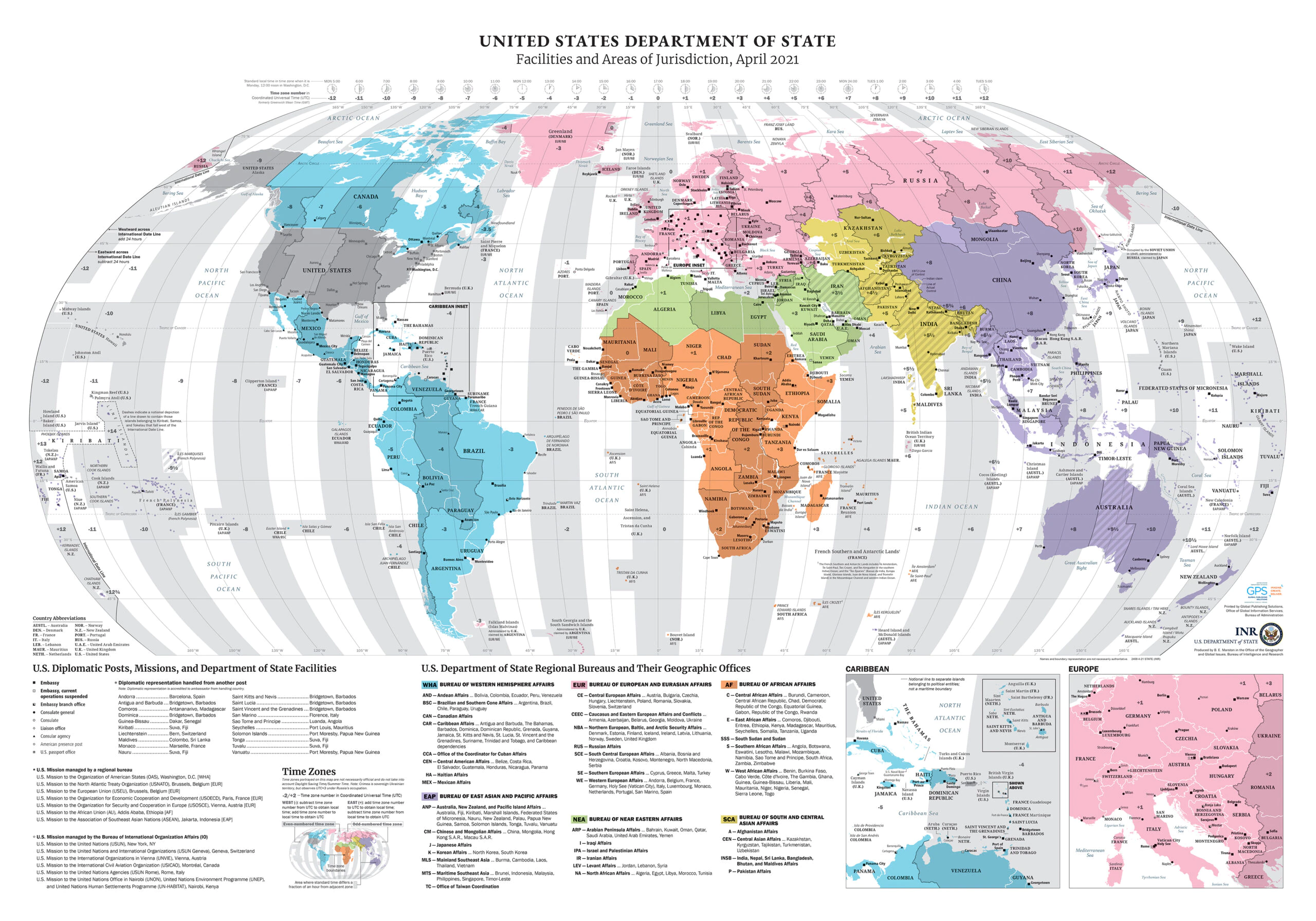
U.S. Department of State facilities and areas of jurisdiction

The United States has the second largest number of active diplomatic posts of any country in the world after the People's Republic of China, including 272 bilateral posts (embassies and consulates) in 174 countries, as well as 11 permanent missions to international organizations and seven other posts (as of May 2025). It maintains "interests sections" (in other states' embassies) in Afghanistan, Iran and North Korea.

== History ==
In December 1777, Morocco became the first nation to seek diplomatic relations with the U.S. and together they maintain the United States' longest unbroken treaty. Benjamin Franklin established the first overseas mission of the U.S. in Paris in 1779. On April 19, 1782, John Adams was received by the States General and the Dutch Republic as they were the first country, together with Morocco and France, to recognize the U.S. as an independent government. John Adams then became the first U.S. ambassador to the Netherlands and the house that he had purchased there, at Fluwelen Burgwal 18 in The Hague, became the first U.S. embassy in the world.

In the period following the American Revolution, President George Washington sent a number of close advisers, including Thomas Jefferson, Adams, Francis Dana, and John Jay, to the courts of European potentates in order to garner recognition of U.S. independence, with mixed results.

The first overseas consulate of the fledgling U.S. was founded in 1790 in Liverpool, Great Britain, by James Maury Jr., who was appointed by Washington. Maury held the post from 1790 to 1829. Liverpool was at the time Britain's leading port for transatlantic commerce and therefore of great economic importance to the United States. Washington, on November 19, 1792, nominated Benjamin Joy of Newbury Port as the first U.S. Consul to Kolkata (then Calcutta), India. Joy was not recognized as consul by the British East India Company but was permitted to "reside here as a Commercial Agent subject to the Civil and Criminal Jurisdiction of this Country." The United States' first owned overseas property is the American Legation in Tangier, which was a gift of the Sultan of Morocco in 1821. In general during the nineteenth century, the United States' diplomatic activities were done on a minimal budget. The U.S. owned no property abroad and provided no official residences for its foreign envoys, paid them a minimal salary, and gave them the rank of ministers rather than ambassadors who represented the great powers—a position which the U.S. only achieved towards the end of the nineteenth century.

In the latter half of the nineteenth century, the State Department was concerned with expanding commercial ties in Asia, establishing Liberia, foiling diplomatic recognition of the Confederate States of America during the American Civil War, and securing its presence in North America. The Confederacy had diplomatic missions in the United Kingdom, France, Belgium, the Papal States, Russia, Mexico, and Spain, and consular missions in Ireland, Canada, Cuba, Italy, Bermuda, and Nassau and New Providence. (For further details, see diplomacy of the American Civil War.)

The United States' global prominence became evident in the twentieth century, and the State Department was required to invest in a large network of diplomatic missions to manage its bilateral and multilateral relations. The wave of overseas construction began with the creation of the State Department's Foreign Service Buildings Commission in 1926.

Following the 1984 US embassy bombing in Beirut, and a 1985 report by Admiral Bobby Ray Inman, new guidelines for American diplomatic buildings focusing on security were issued. It advised that facilities should be located within a single, well-defended site, away from heavily populated areas.

As of 2024, America had the two largest embassy complexes in the world, in Baghdad and Beirut.

== Current missions ==
=== Africa ===
At one point or another, the U.S. has maintained embassies in all the African states it recognizes with the exception of São Tomé and Príncipe. The U.S. Embassies in Libya and Sudan have been closed for security-related reasons since 26 July 2014 and 22 April 2023 respectively. The U.S. Embassies in Comoros and Guinea-Bissau closed in 1993 and 1998 respectively. The Comoros is covered by the U.S. Embassy in Antananarivo and Guinea-Bissau, which continues to host a Liaison Office in Bissau, is covered by the U.S. Embassy in Dakar.

Host country	Host city	Mission	Concurrent accreditation	Ref.
Algeria	Algiers	Embassy		
Angola	Luanda	Embassy	Countries: São Tomé and Príncipe	
Benin	Cotonou	Embassy		
Botswana	Gaborone	Embassy		
Burkina Faso	Ouagadougou	Embassy		
Burundi	Bujumbura	Embassy		
Cameroon	Yaoundé	Embassy		
Cameroon	Douala	Embassy Branch Office		
Cape Verde	Praia	Embassy		
Central African Republic	Bangui	Embassy		
Chad	N'Djamena	Embassy		
Republic of the Congo	Brazzaville	Embassy		
Democratic Republic of the Congo	Kinshasa	Embassy		
Djibouti	Djibouti	Embassy		
Egypt	Cairo	Embassy		
Equatorial Guinea	Malabo	Embassy		
Eritrea	Asmara	Embassy		
Eswatini	Mbabane	Embassy		
Ethiopia	Addis Ababa	Embassy		
Gabon	Libreville	Embassy		
Gambia	Banjul	Embassy		
Ghana	Accra	Embassy		
Guinea	Conakry	Embassy		
Guinea-Bissau	Bissau	Liaison Office (Note: The United States has no embassy in Guinea-Bissau. The U.S. ambassador to Senegal is concurrently accredited to Guinea-Bissau, while the liaison office in Bissau is staffed by local employees and does not provide consular services.)		
Ivory Coast	Abidjan	Embassy		
Kenya	Nairobi	Embassy		
Lesotho	Maseru	Embassy		
Liberia	Monrovia	Embassy		
Madagascar	Antananarivo	Embassy	Countries: Comoros	
Malawi	Lilongwe	Embassy		
Mali	Bamako	Embassy		
Mauritania	Nouakchott	Embassy		
Mauritius	Port Louis	Embassy		
Mozambique	Maputo	Embassy		
Morocco	Rabat	Embassy		
Morocco	Casablanca	Consulate General		
Namibia	Windhoek	Embassy		
Niger	Niamey	Embassy		
Nigeria	Abuja	Embassy		
Nigeria	Lagos	Consulate General		
Rwanda	Kigali	Embassy		
Senegal	Dakar	Embassy	Countries: Guinea-Bissau	
Seychelles	Victoria	Embassy		
Sierra Leone	Freetown	Embassy		
Somalia	Mogadishu	Embassy		
South Africa	Pretoria	Embassy		
South Africa	Cape Town	Consulate General		
South Africa	Durban	Consulate General		
South Africa	Johannesburg	Consulate General		
South Sudan	Juba	Embassy		
Tanzania	Dar es Salaam	Embassy		
Togo	Lomé	Embassy		
Tunisia	Tunis	Embassy	Countries: Libya	
Uganda	Kampala	Embassy		
Zambia	Lusaka	Embassy		
Zimbabwe	Harare	Embassy		

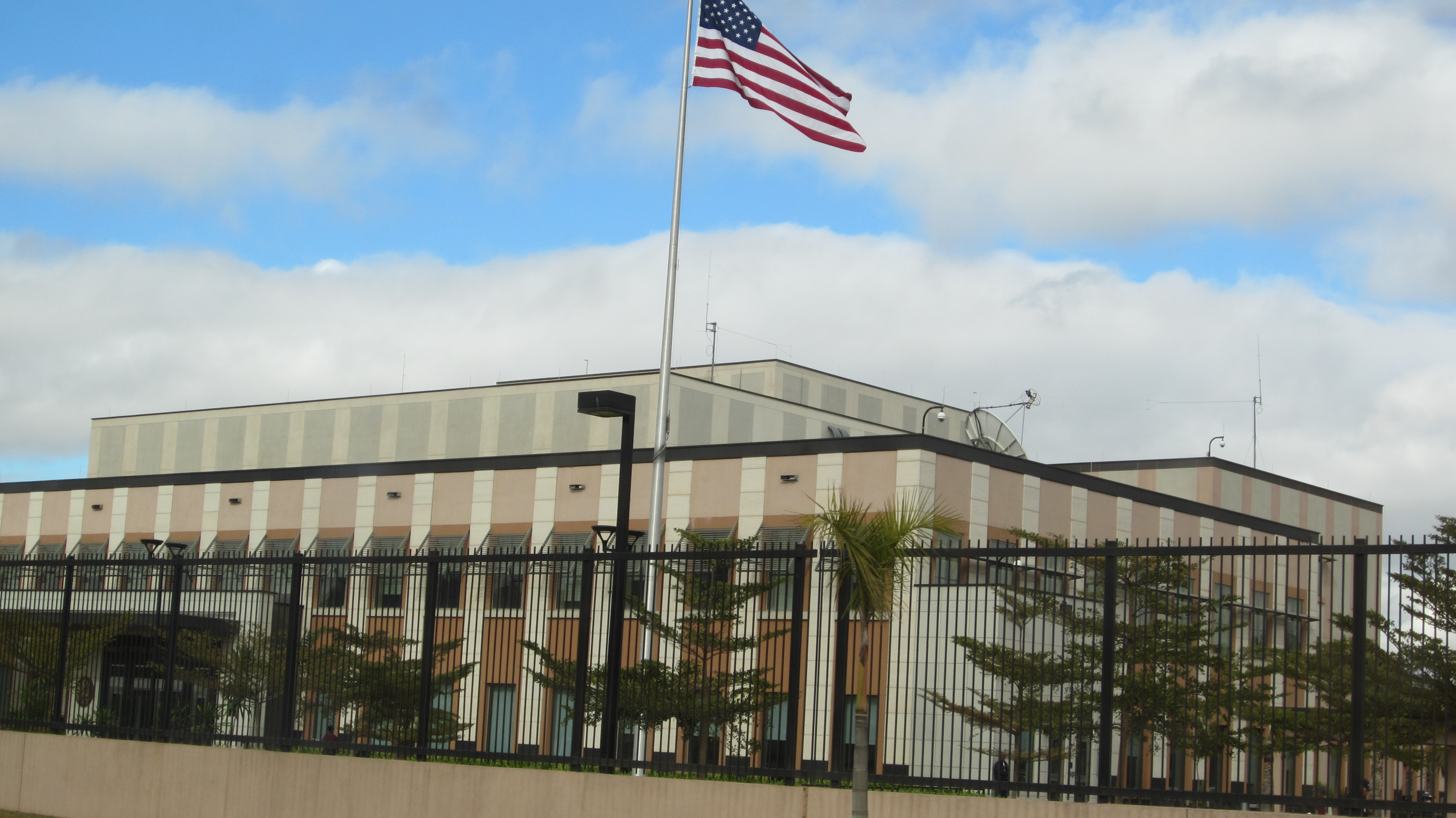
Embassy in Antananarivo

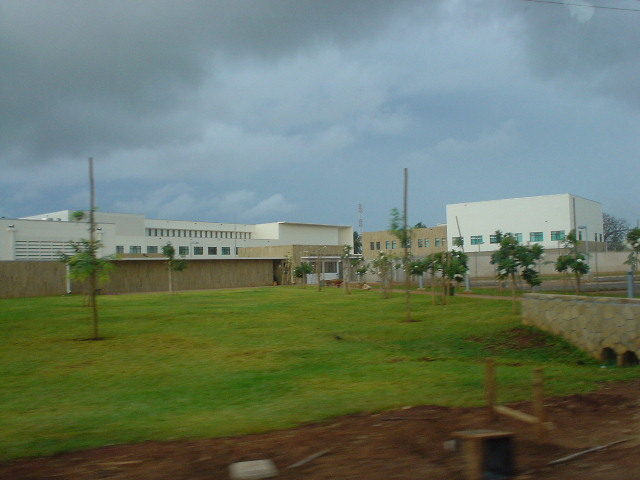
Embassy in Dar es Salaam

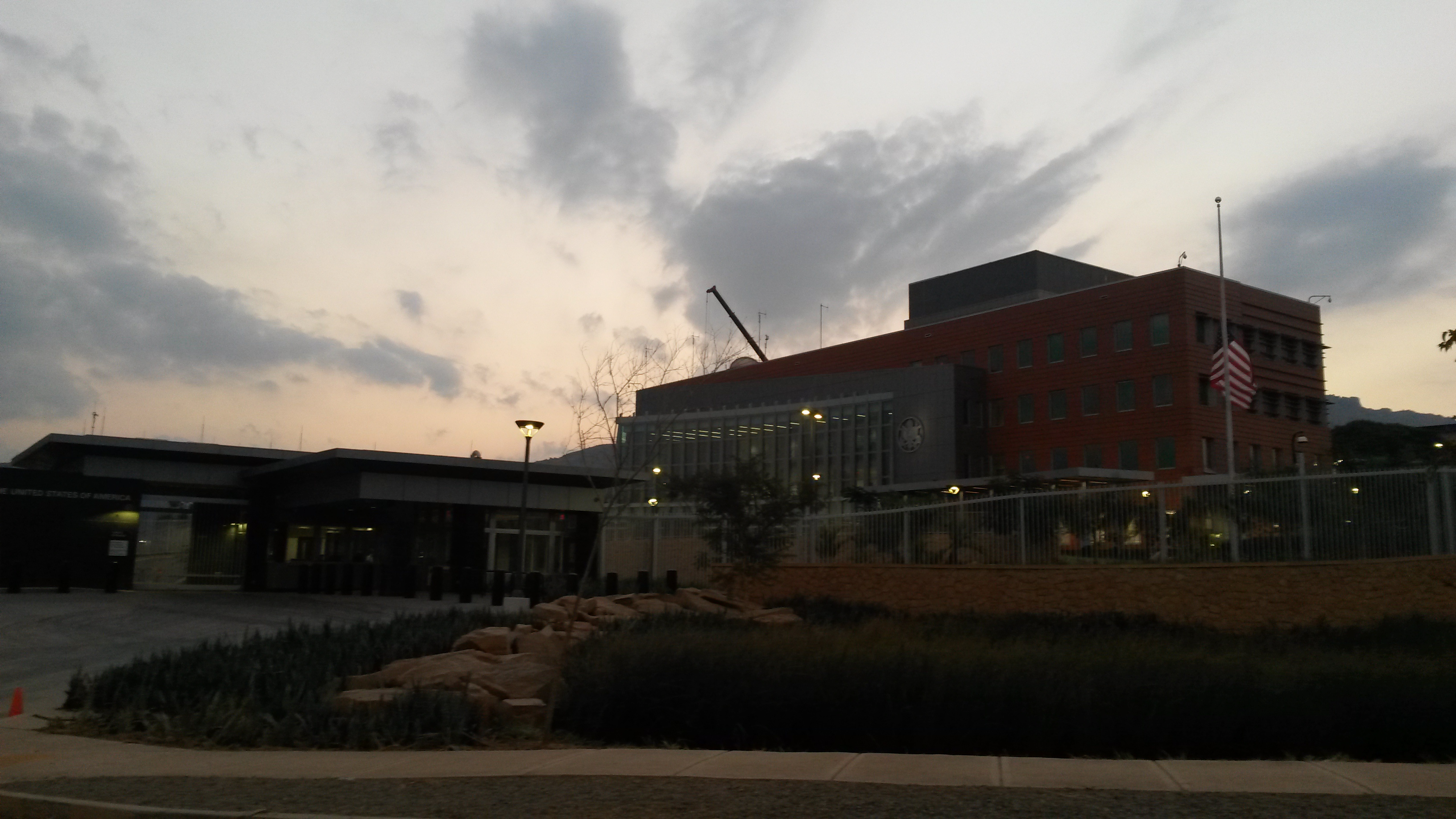
Embassy in Mbabane

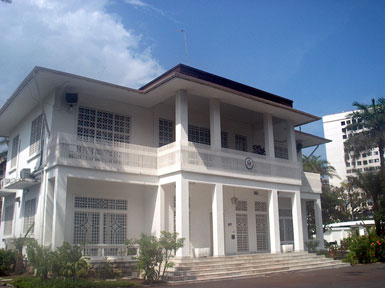
Embassy in Libreville

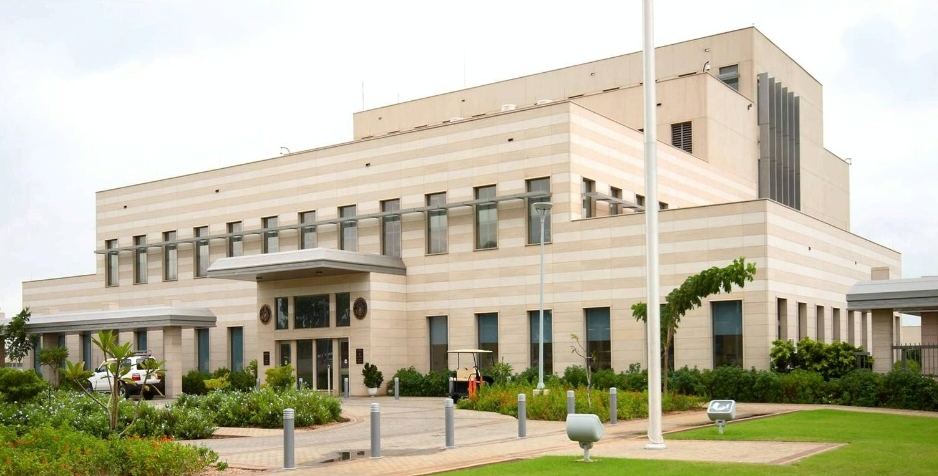
Embassy in Lomé

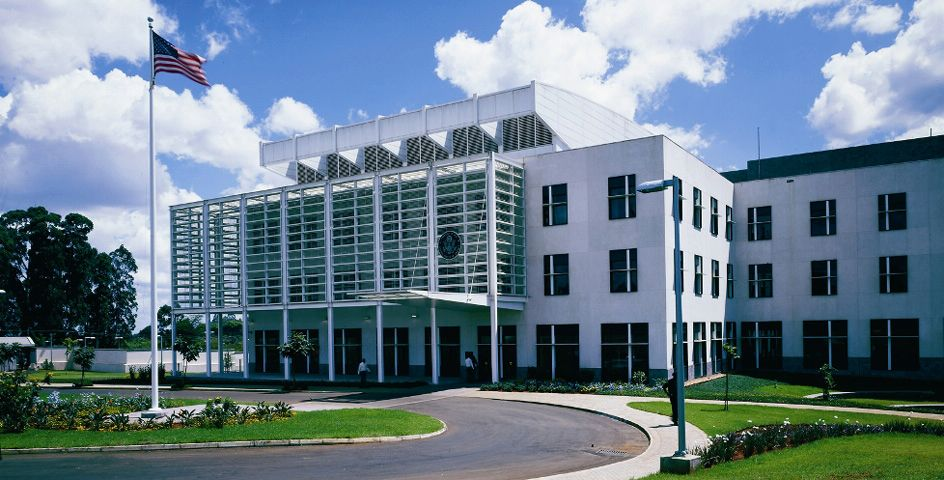
Embassy in Nairobi

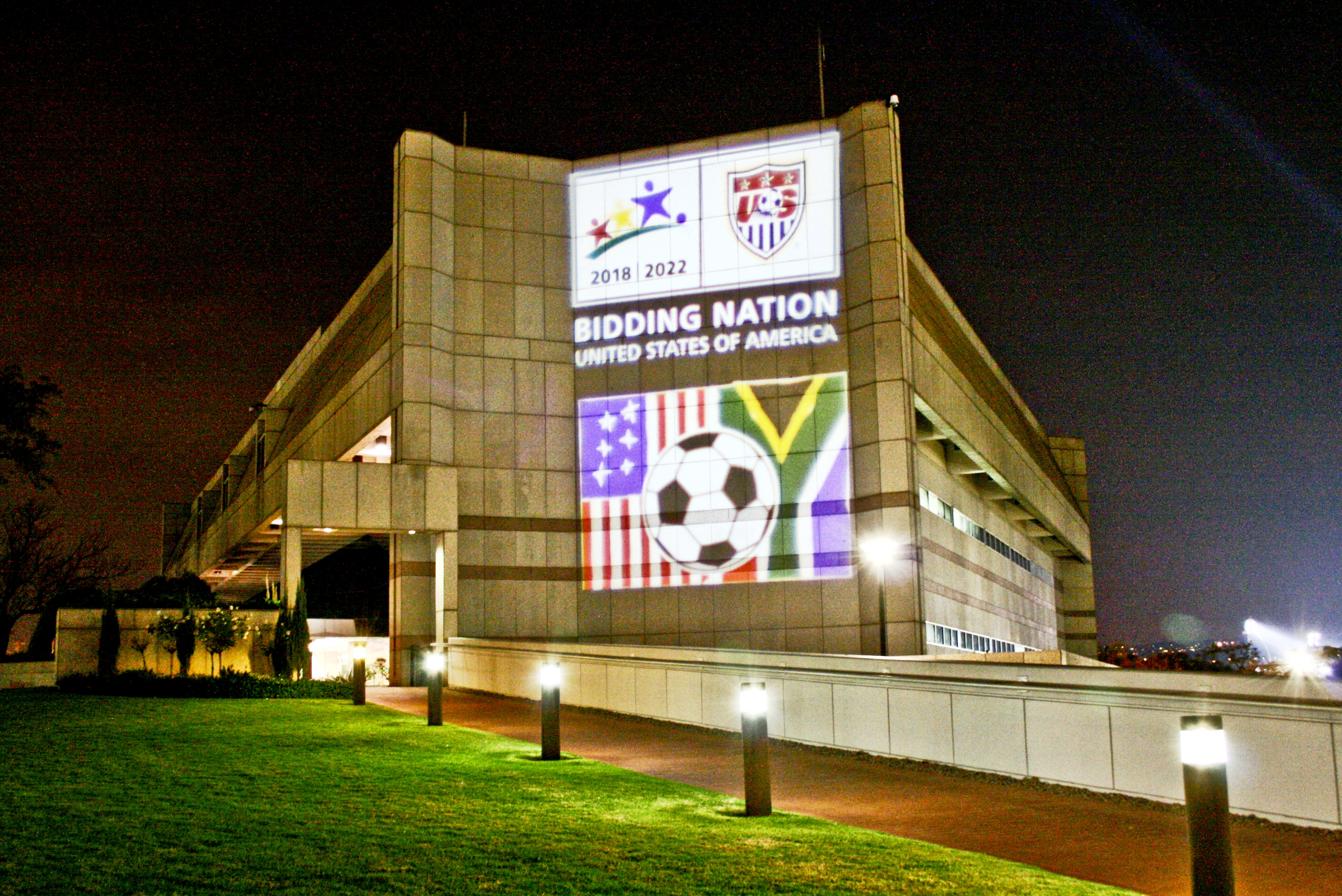
Embassy in Pretoria

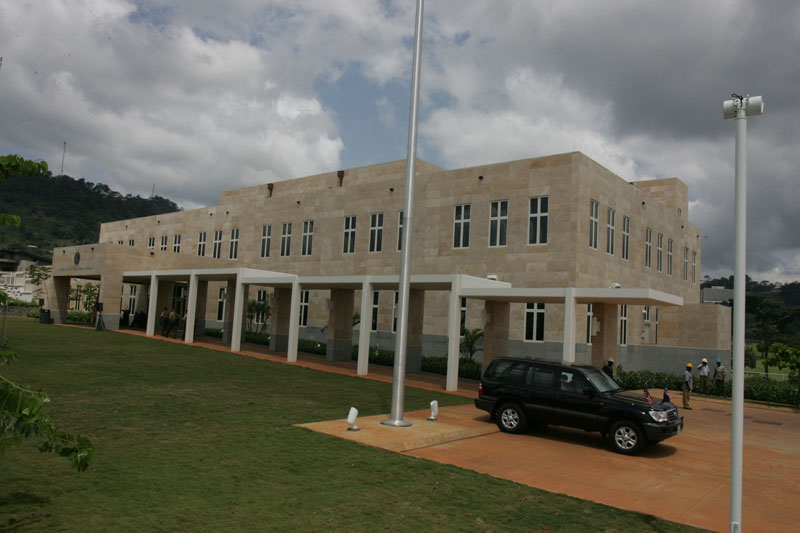
Embassy in Yaoundé

=== Americas ===
The U.S. has embassies in all states in the North and South American continents with the exceptions of Antigua & Barbuda (where it has a consular agency), Dominica, Saint Kitts and Nevis, Saint Lucia and Saint Vincent and the Grenadines.

Host country	Host city	Mission	Concurrent accreditation	Ref.
Antigua and Barbuda	St. John's	Consular Agency		
Argentina	Buenos Aires	Embassy		
Bahamas	Nassau	Embassy		
Barbados	Bridgetown	Embassy	Countries: Dominica; Saint Kitts and Nevis; Saint Lucia; Saint Vincent and the Grenadines	
Belize	Belmopan	Embassy		
Bolivia	La Paz	Embassy		
Bolivia	Santa Cruz de la Sierra	Consular Agency		
Brazil	Brasília	Embassy		
Brazil	Porto Alegre	Consulate General		
Brazil	Recife	Consulate General		
Brazil	Rio de Janeiro	Consulate General		
Brazil	São Paulo	Consulate General		
Brazil	Belo Horizonte	Embassy Branch Office		
Brazil	Fortaleza	Consular Agency		
Brazil	Manaus	Consular Agency		
Brazil	Salvador	Consular Agency		
Canada	Ottawa	Embassy		
Canada	Calgary	Consulate General		
Canada	Halifax	Consulate General		
Canada	Montreal	Consulate General		
Canada	Quebec City	Consulate General		
Canada	Toronto	Consulate General		
Canada	Vancouver	Consulate General		
Canada	Winnipeg	Consulate		
Chile	Santiago de Chile	Embassy		
Colombia	Bogotá	Embassy		
Costa Rica	San José	Embassy		
Cuba	Havana	Embassy		
Dominican Republic	Santo Domingo	Embassy		
Dominican Republic	Bávaro	Consular Agency		
Dominican Republic	Puerto Plata	Consular Agency		
Ecuador	Quito	Embassy		
Ecuador	Guayaquil	Consulate General		
El Salvador	San Salvador	Embassy		
Grenada	St. George's	Mission		
Guatemala	Guatemala City	Embassy		
Guyana	Georgetown	Embassy		
Haiti	Port-au-Prince	Embassy		
Honduras	Tegucigalpa	Embassy		
Honduras	San Pedro Sula	Consular Agency		
Jamaica	Kingston	Embassy		
Jamaica	Montego Bay	Consular Agency		
Mexico	Mexico City	Embassy		
Mexico	Ciudad Juárez	Consulate General		
Mexico	Guadalajara	Consulate General		
Mexico	Hermosillo	Consulate General		
Mexico	Matamoros	Consulate General		
Mexico	Mérida	Consulate General		
Mexico	Monterrey	Consulate General		
Mexico	Nogales	Consulate General		
Mexico	Nuevo Laredo	Consulate General		
Mexico	Tijuana	Consulate General		
Mexico	Acapulco	Consular Agency		
Mexico	Cabo San Lucas	Consular Agency		
Mexico	Cancún	Consular Agency		
Mexico	Mazatlán	Consular Agency		
Mexico	Oaxaca City	Consular Agency		
Mexico	Piedras Negras	Consular Agency		
Mexico	Playa del Carmen	Consular Agency		
Mexico	Puerto Vallarta	Consular Agency		
Mexico	San Miguel de Allende	Consular Agency		
Nicaragua	Managua	Embassy		
Panama	Panama City	Embassy		
Paraguay	Asunción	Embassy		
Peru	Lima	Embassy		
Peru	Cusco	Consular Agency		
Suriname	Paramaribo	Embassy		
Trinidad and Tobago	Port of Spain	Embassy		
Uruguay	Montevideo	Embassy		
Venezuela	Caracas	Embassy		

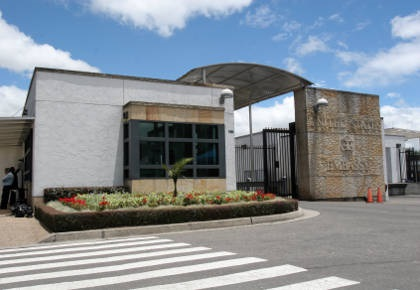
Embassy in Bogotá

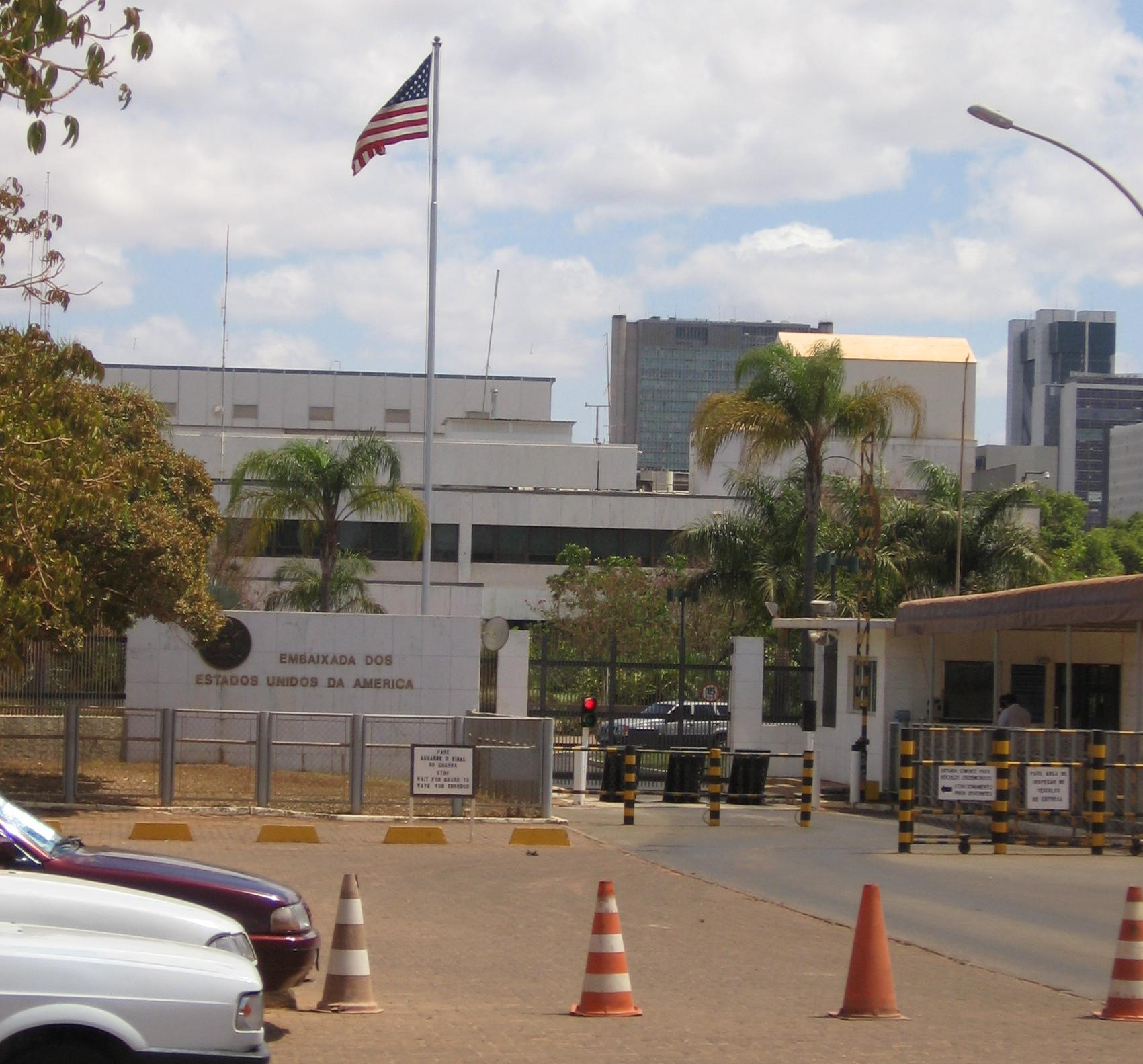
Embassy in Brasília

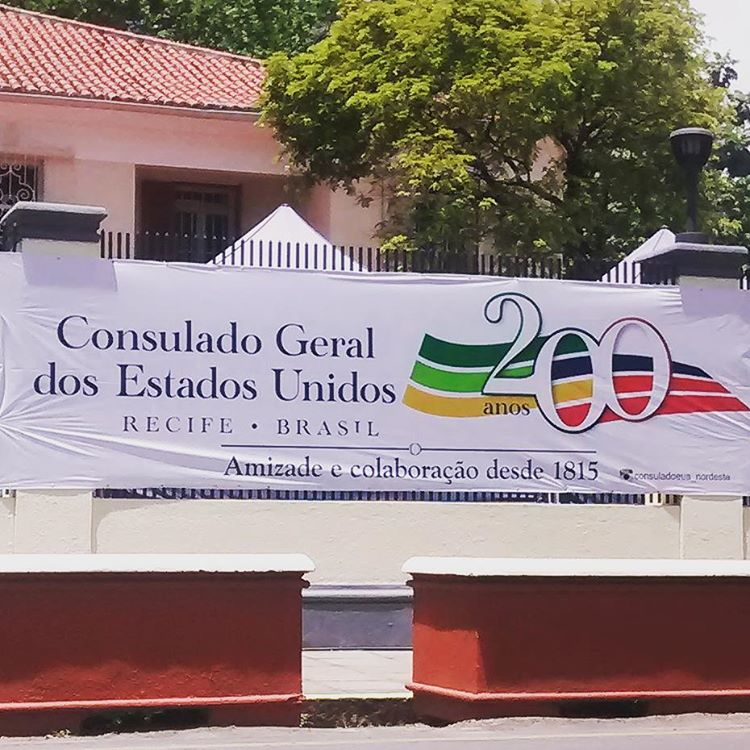
Consulate-General in Recife

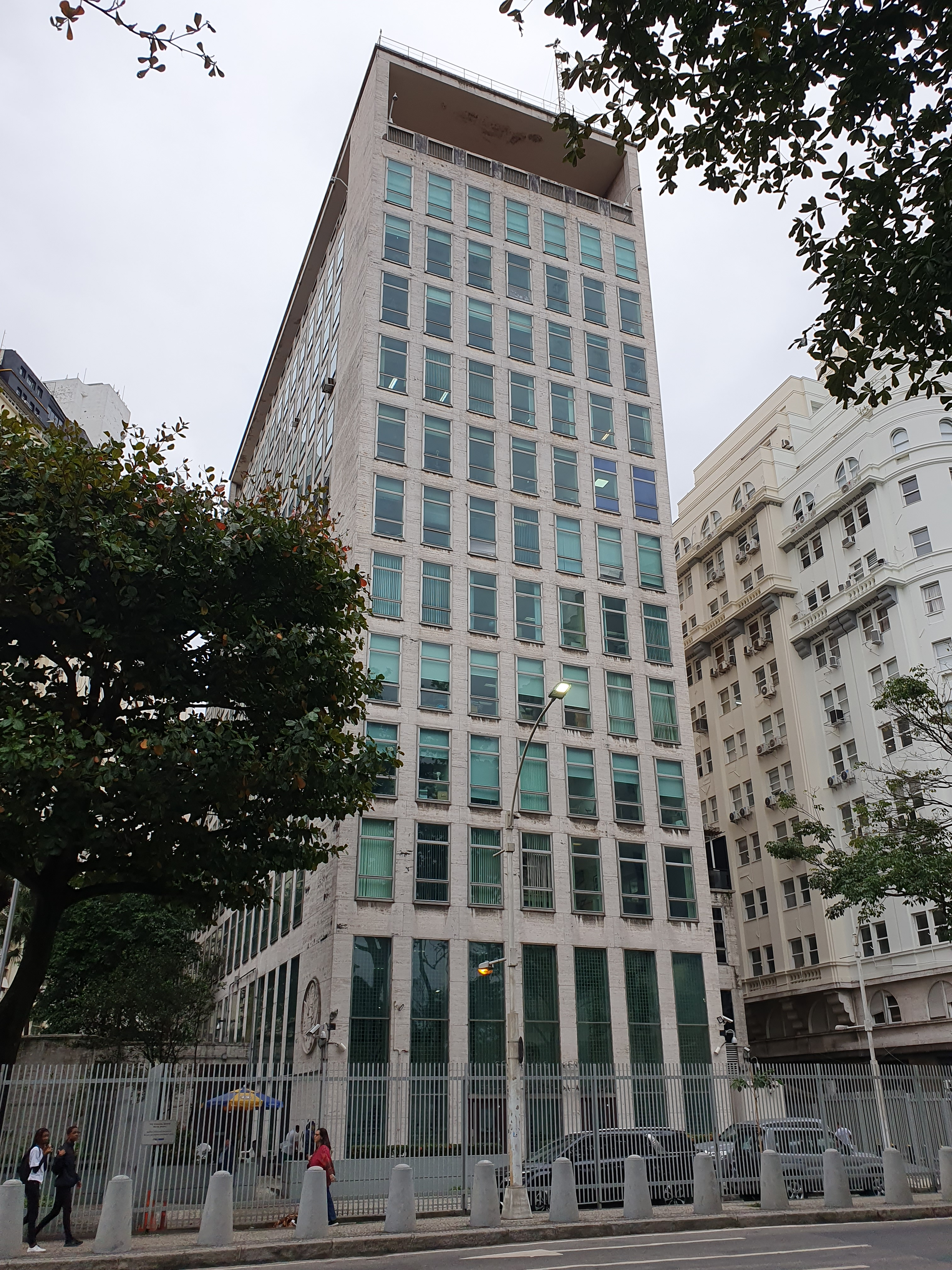
Consulate-General in Rio de Janeiro

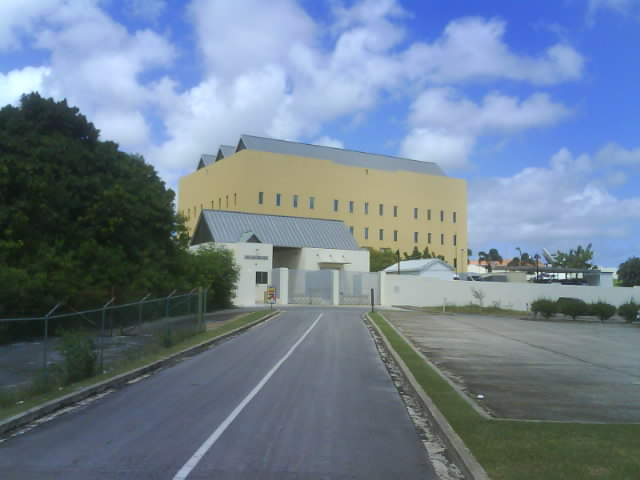
Embassy in Bridgetown

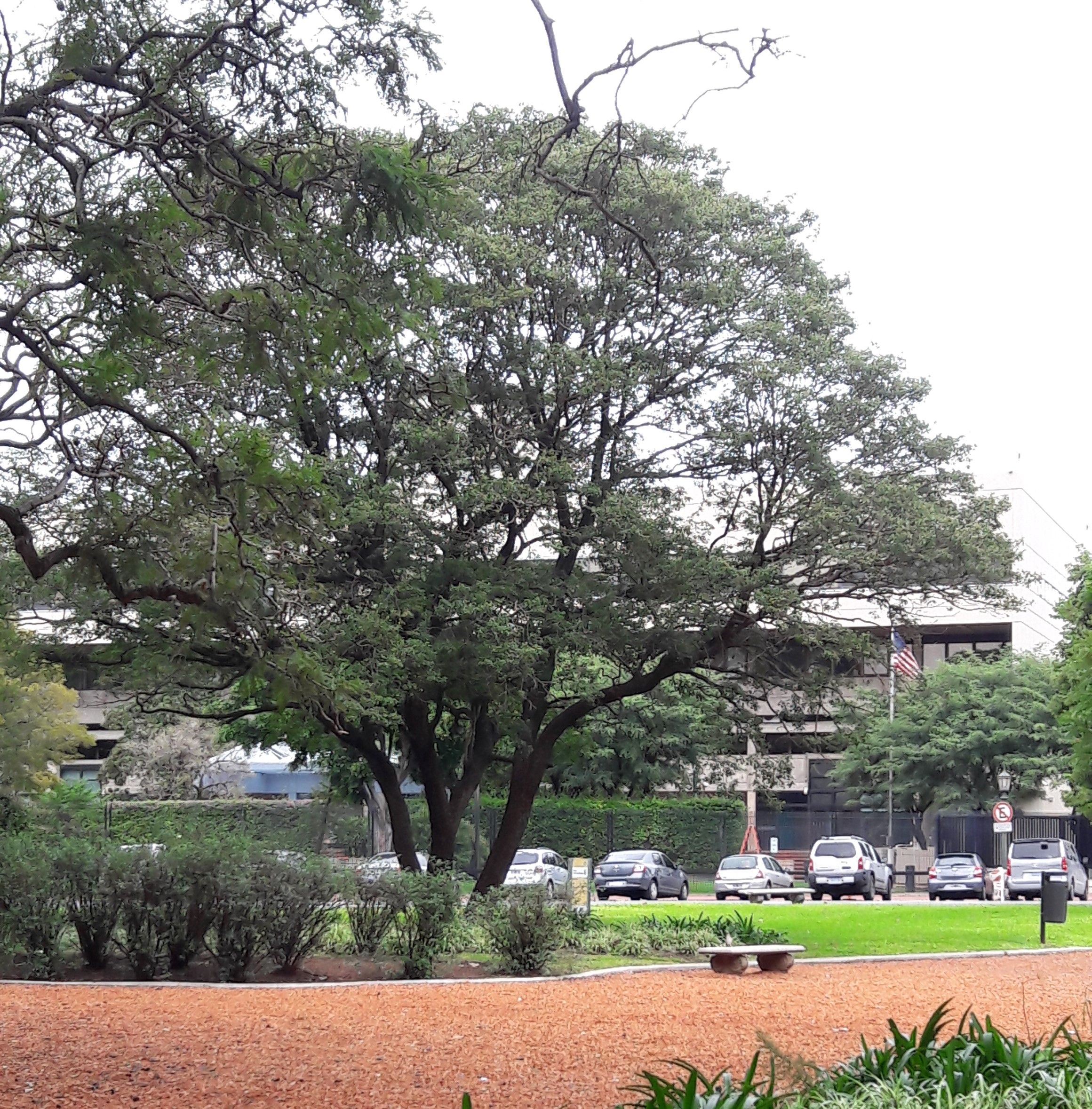
Embassy in Buenos Aires

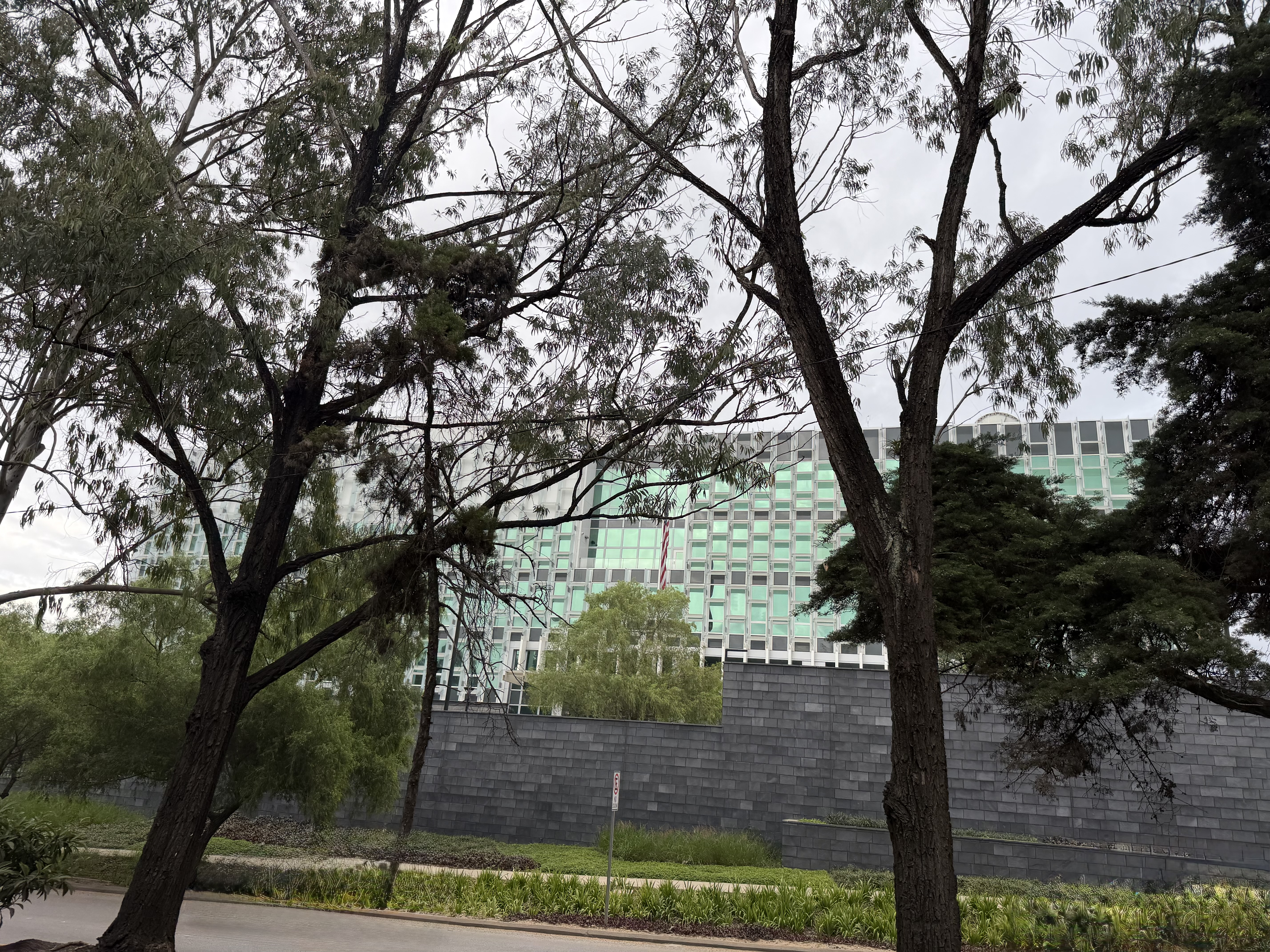
Embassy in Guatemala City

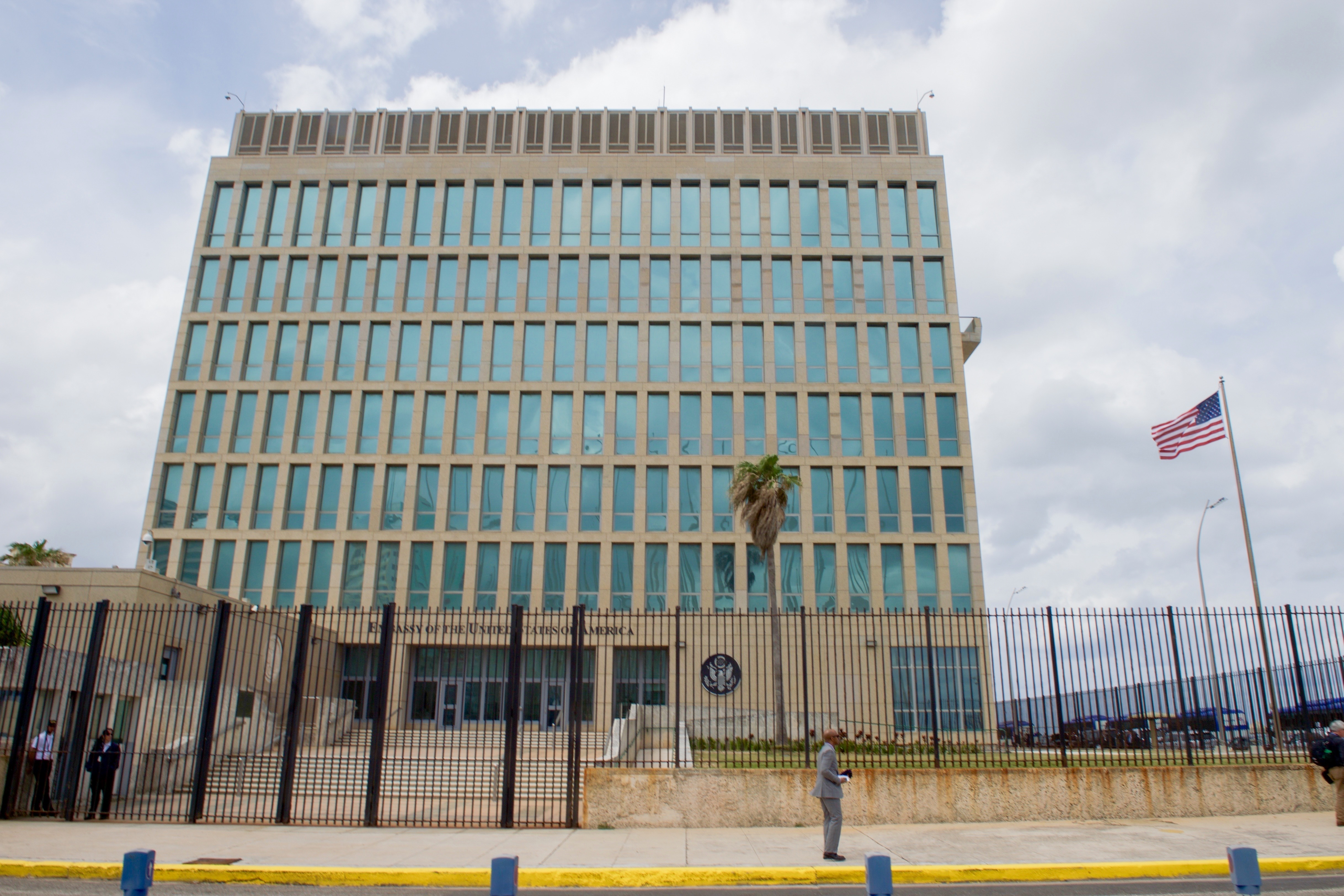
Embassy in Havana

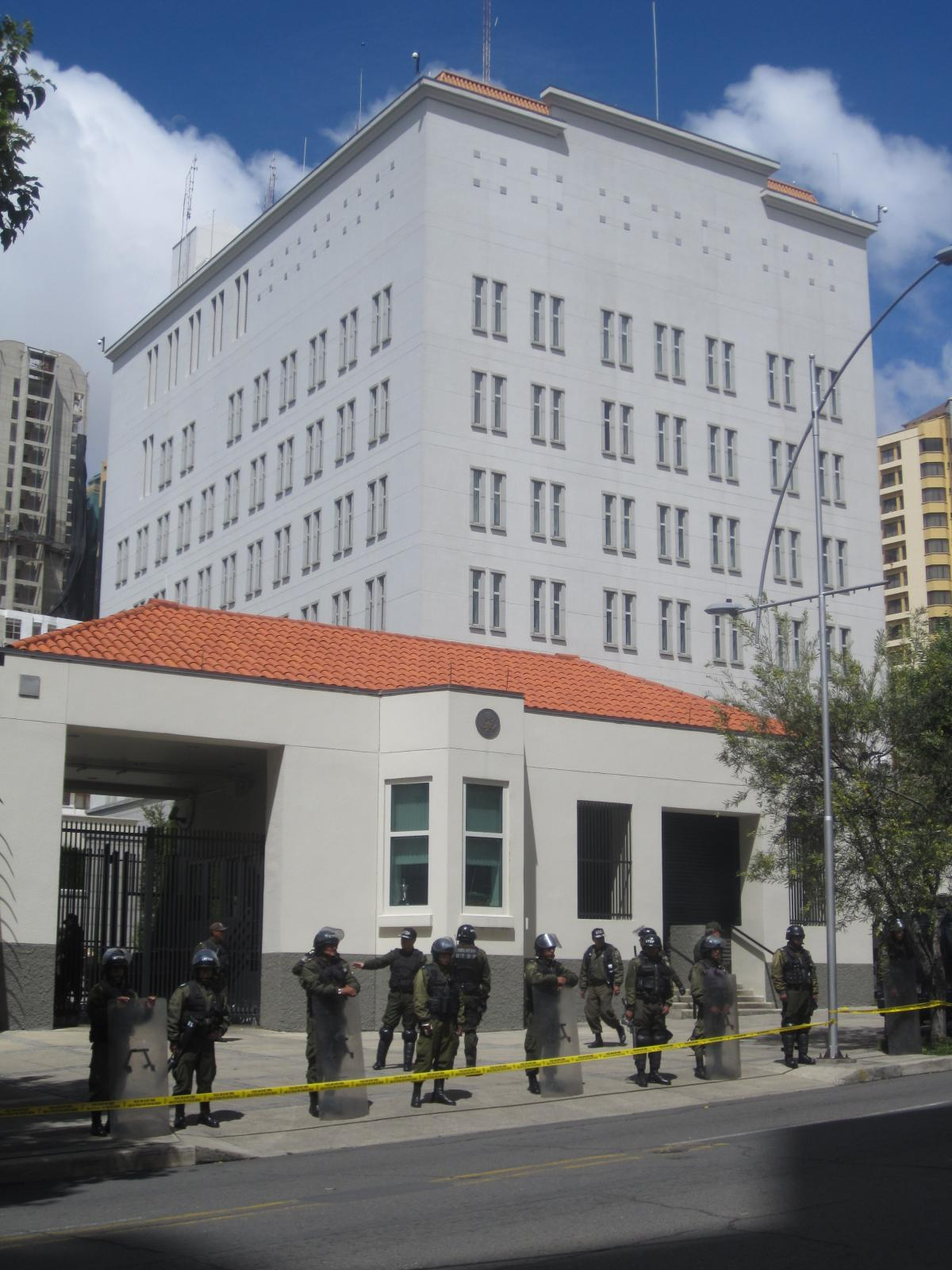
Embassy in La Paz

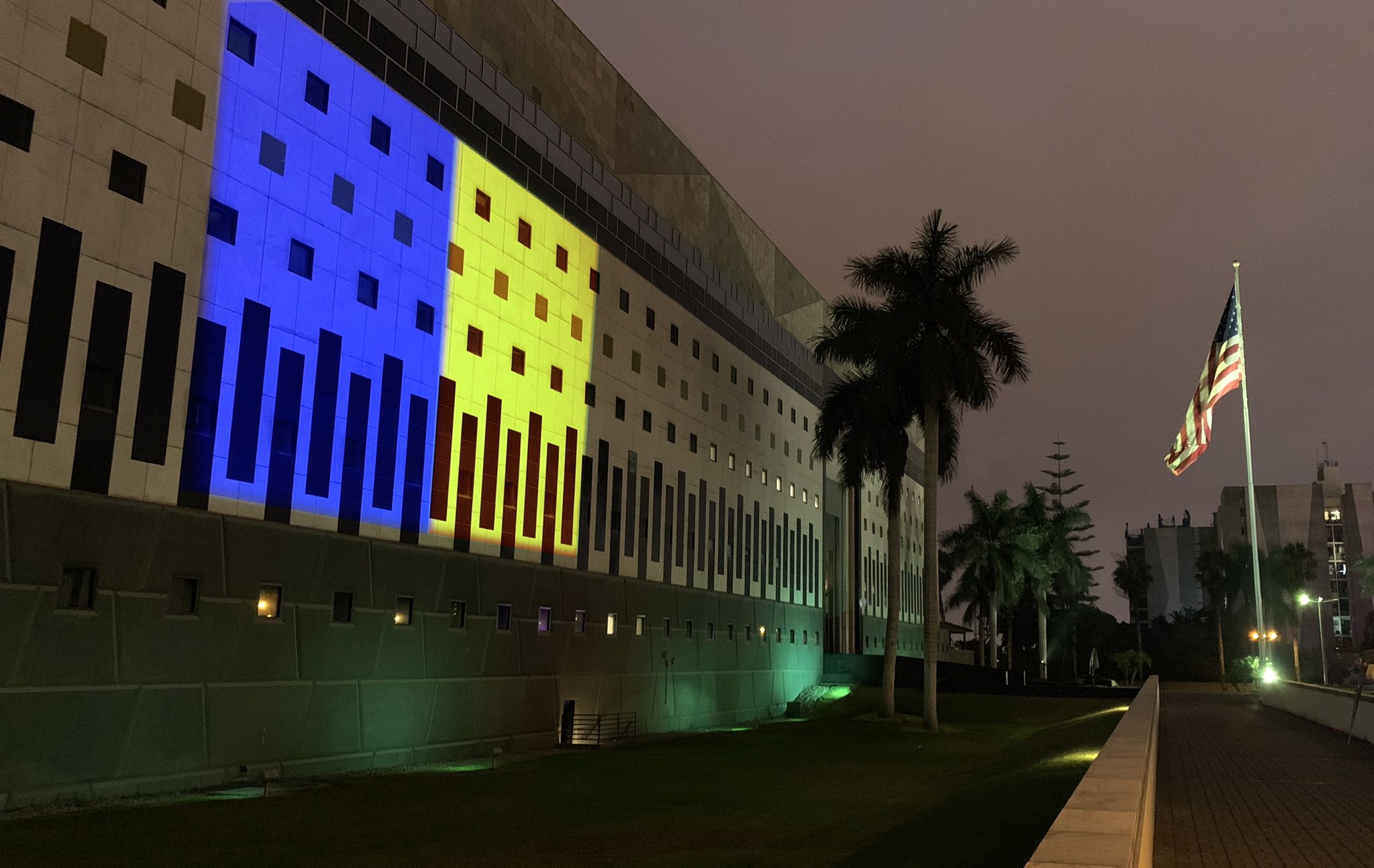
Embassy in Lima

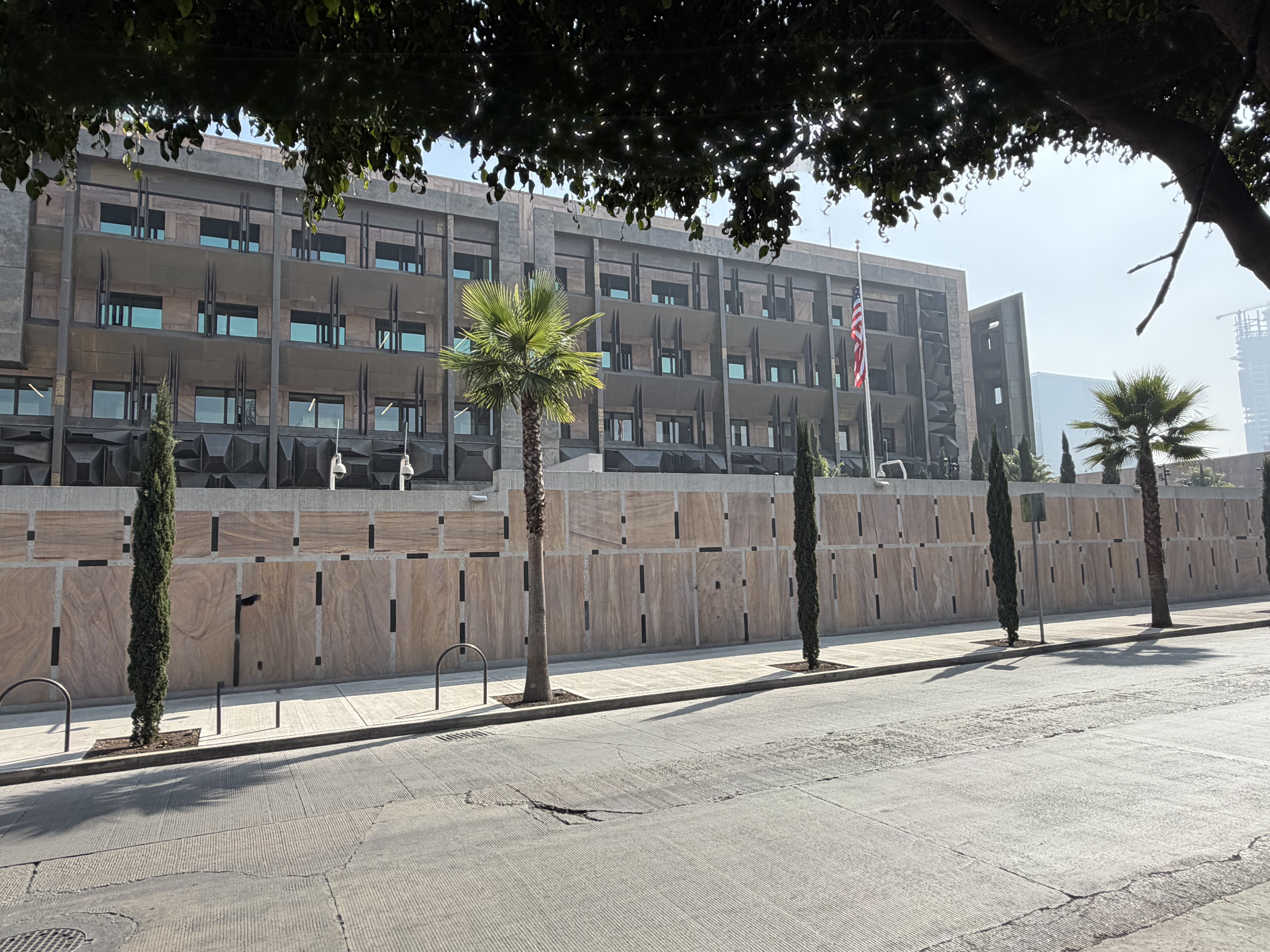
Embassy in Mexico City

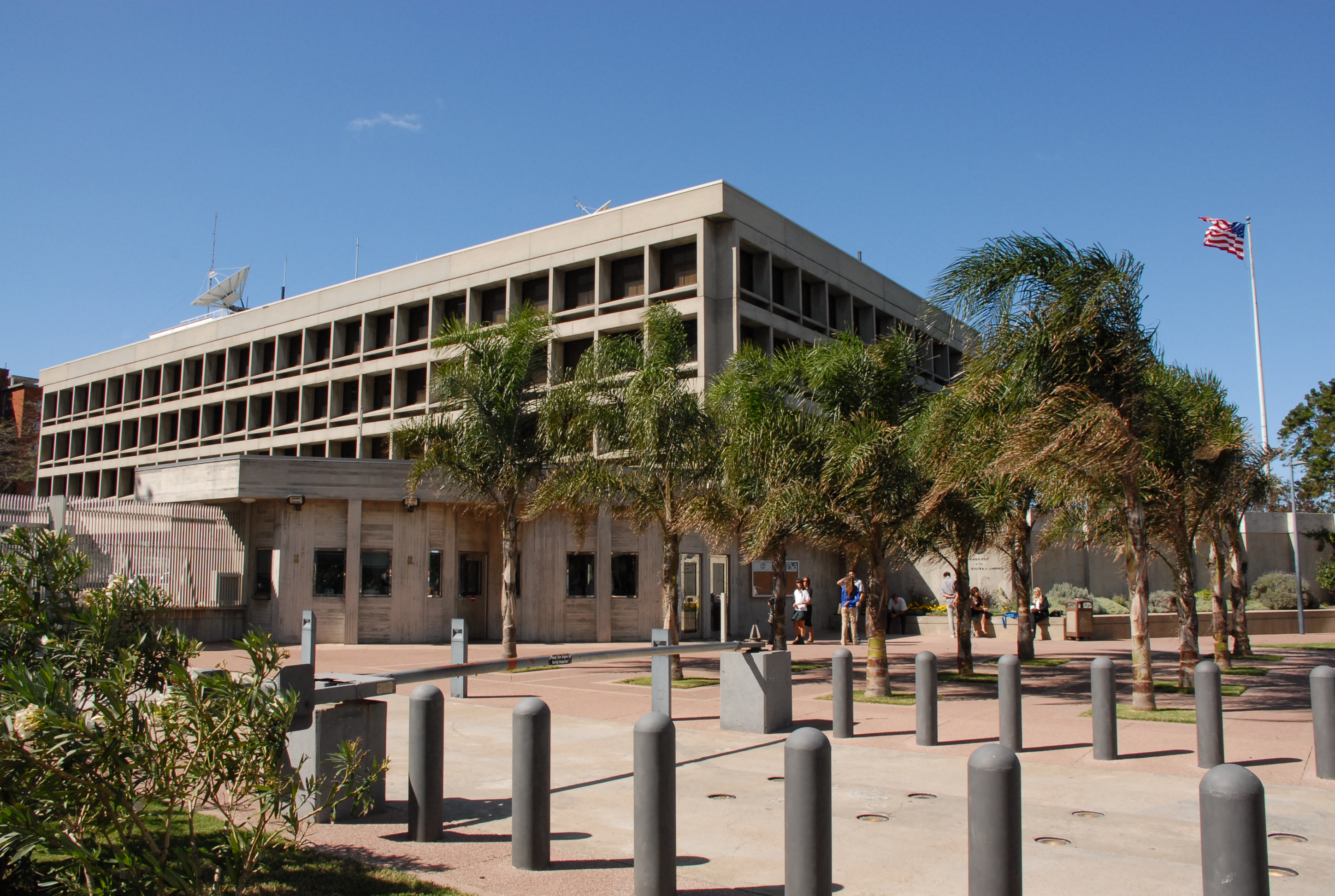
Embassy in Montevideo

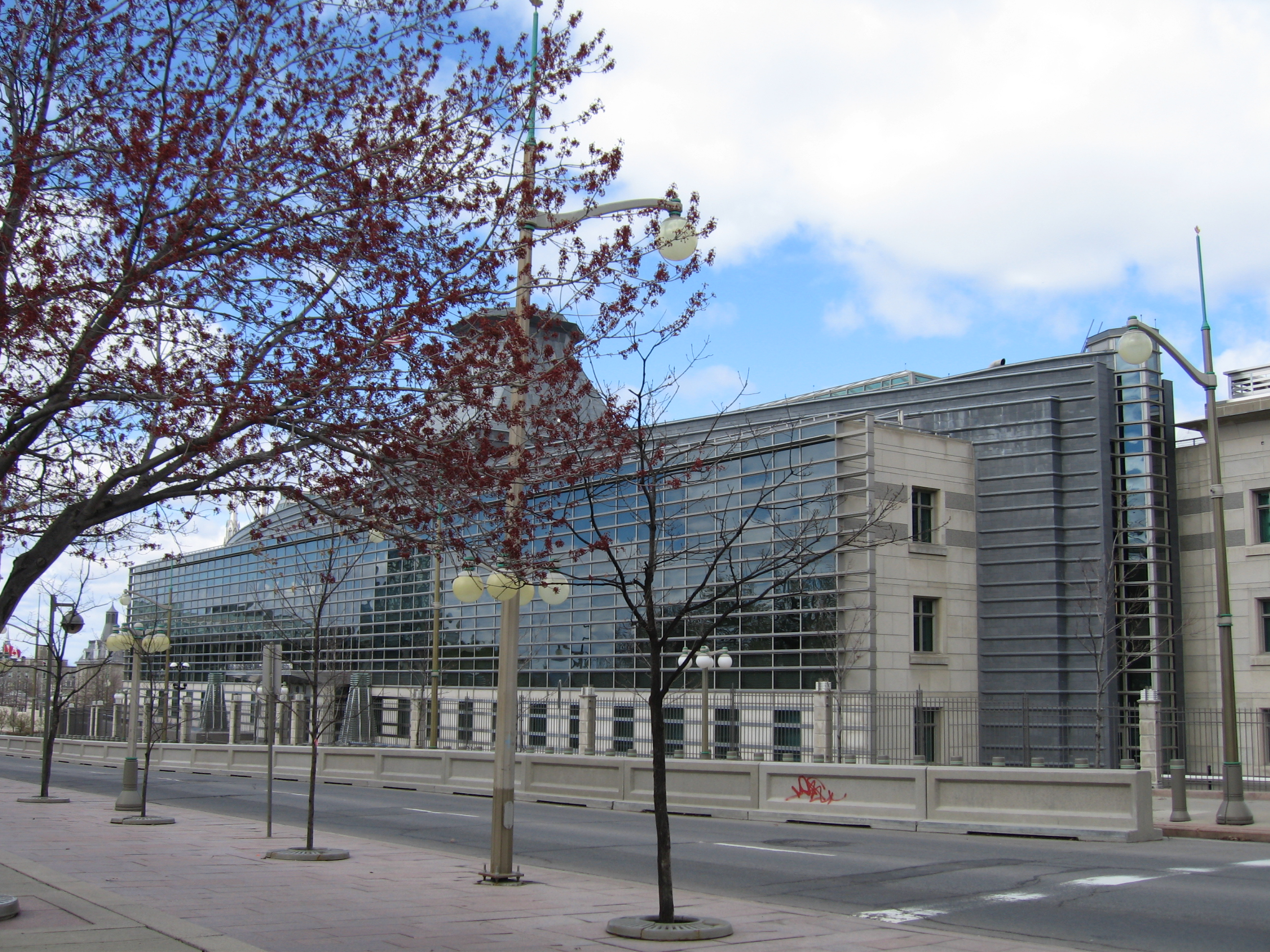
Embassy in Ottawa

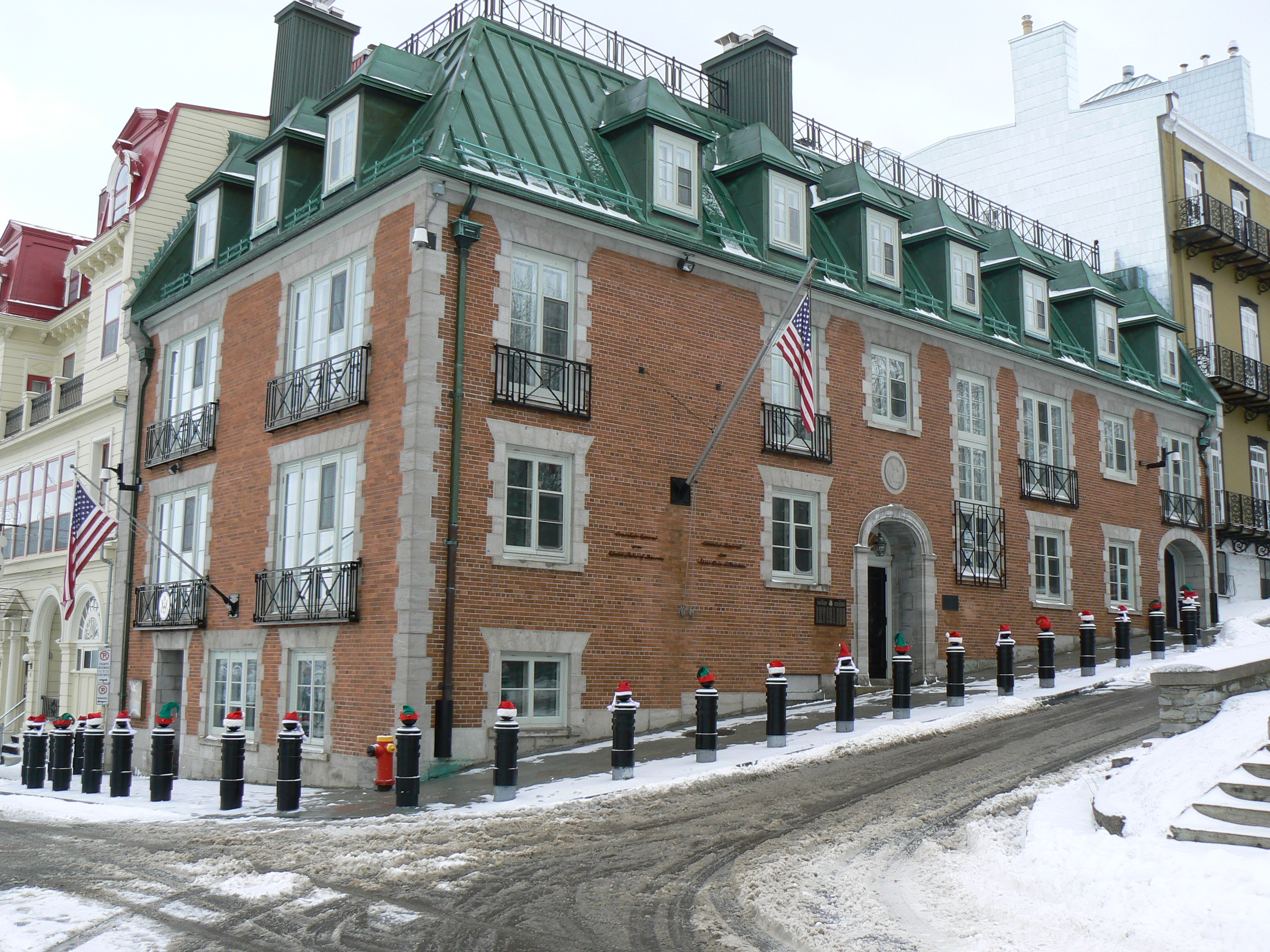
Consulate-General in Quebec City

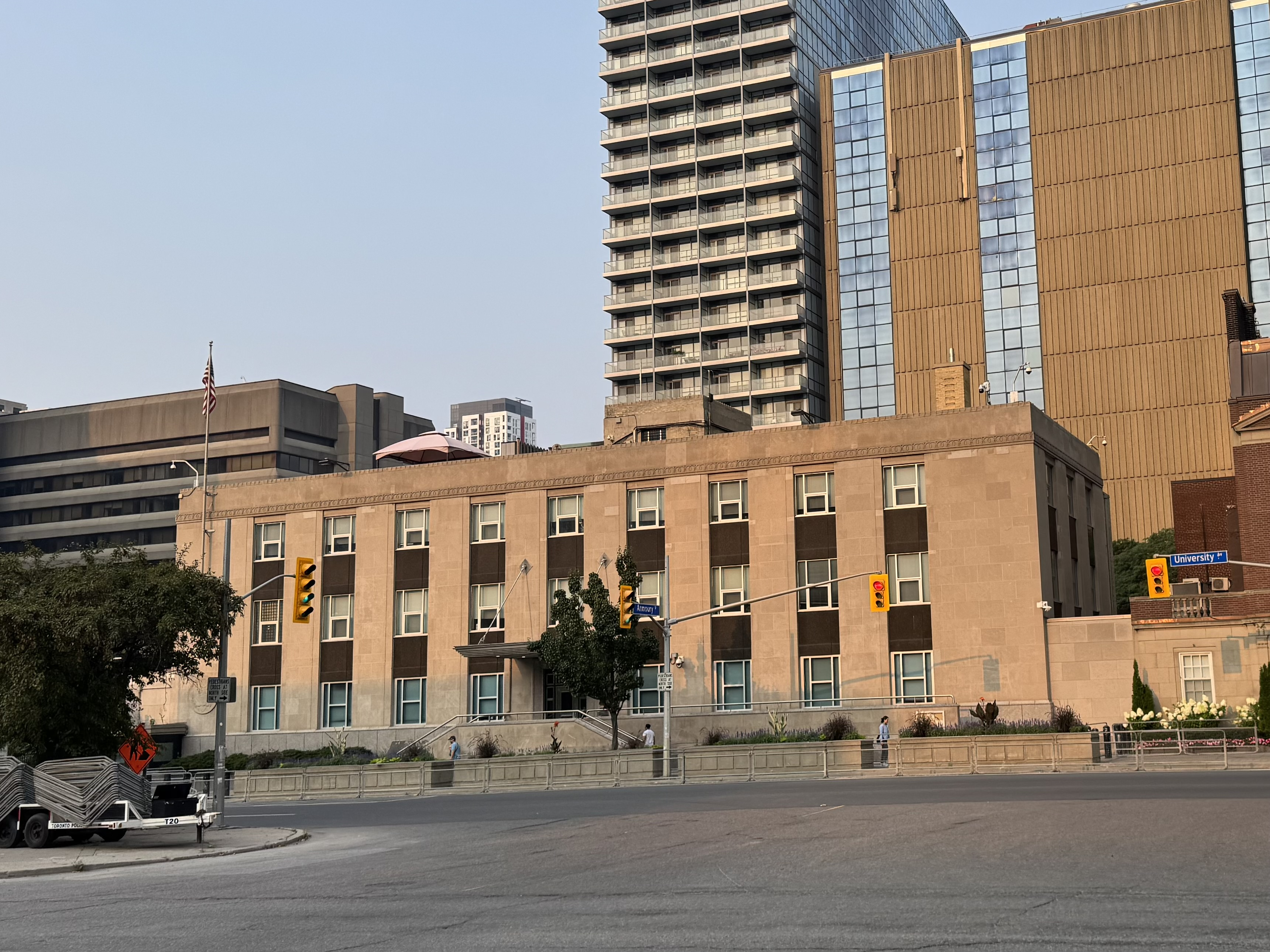
Consulate-General in Toronto

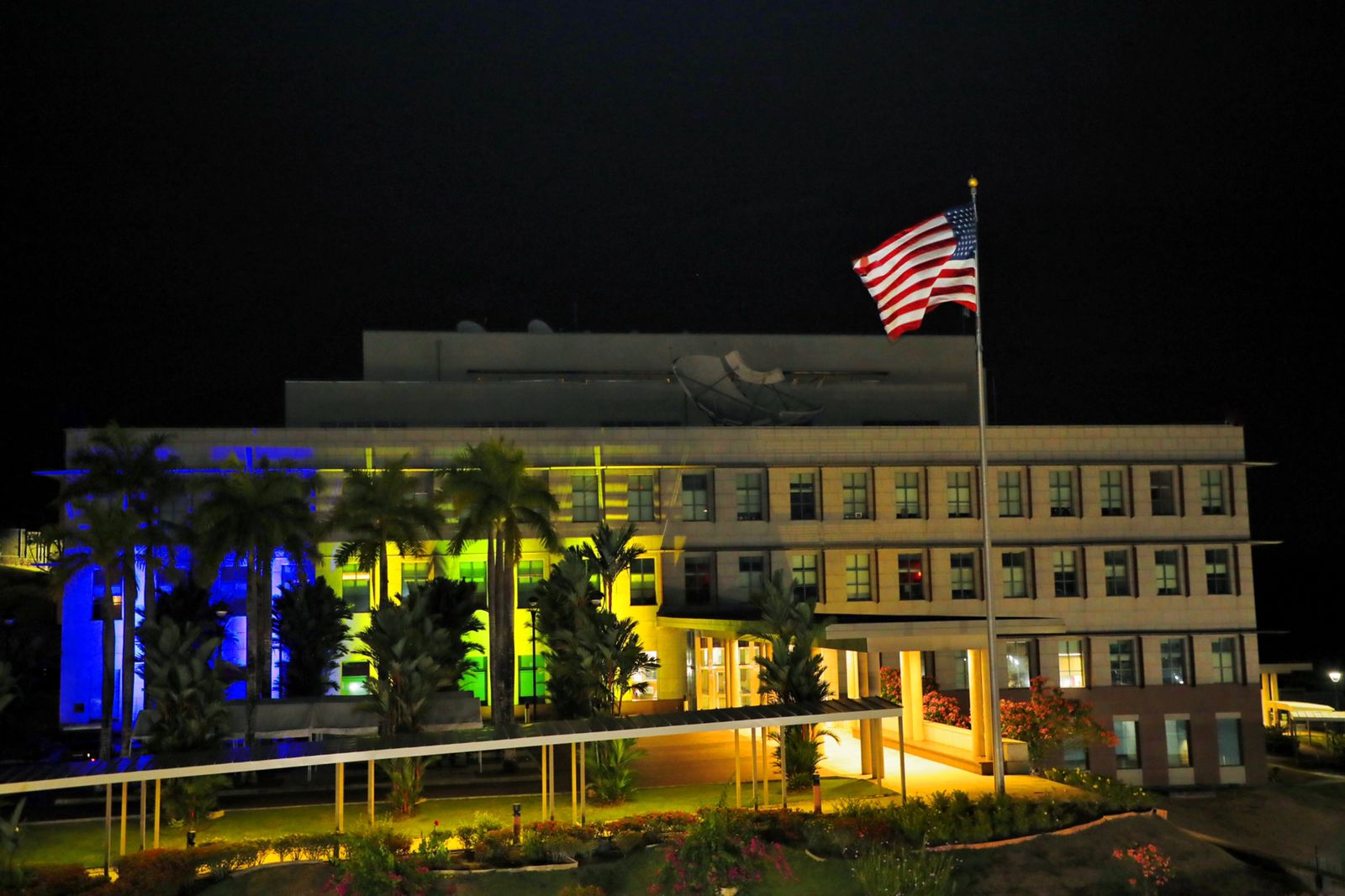
Embassy in Panama City

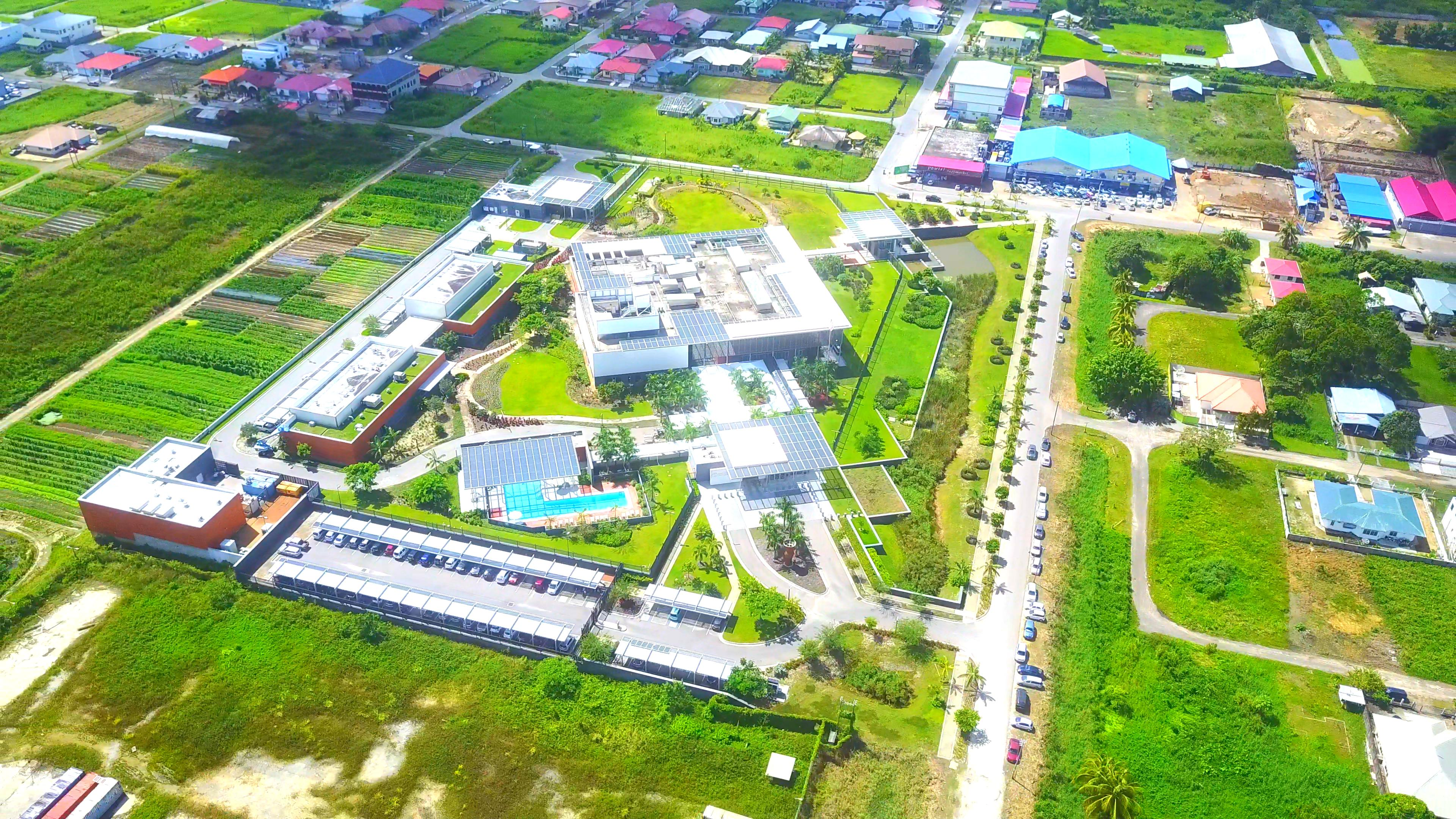
Embassy in Paramaribo

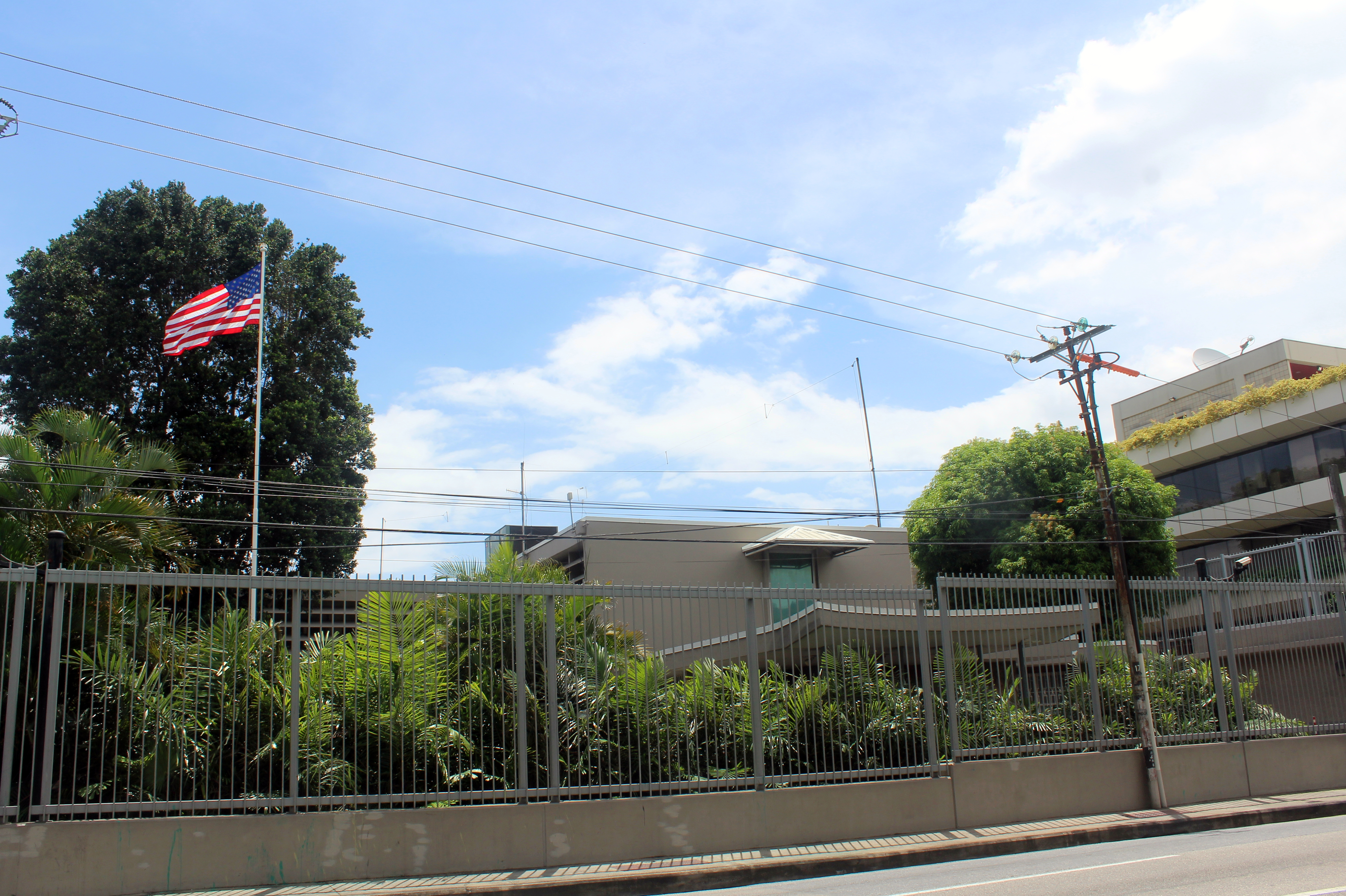
Embassy in Port of Spain

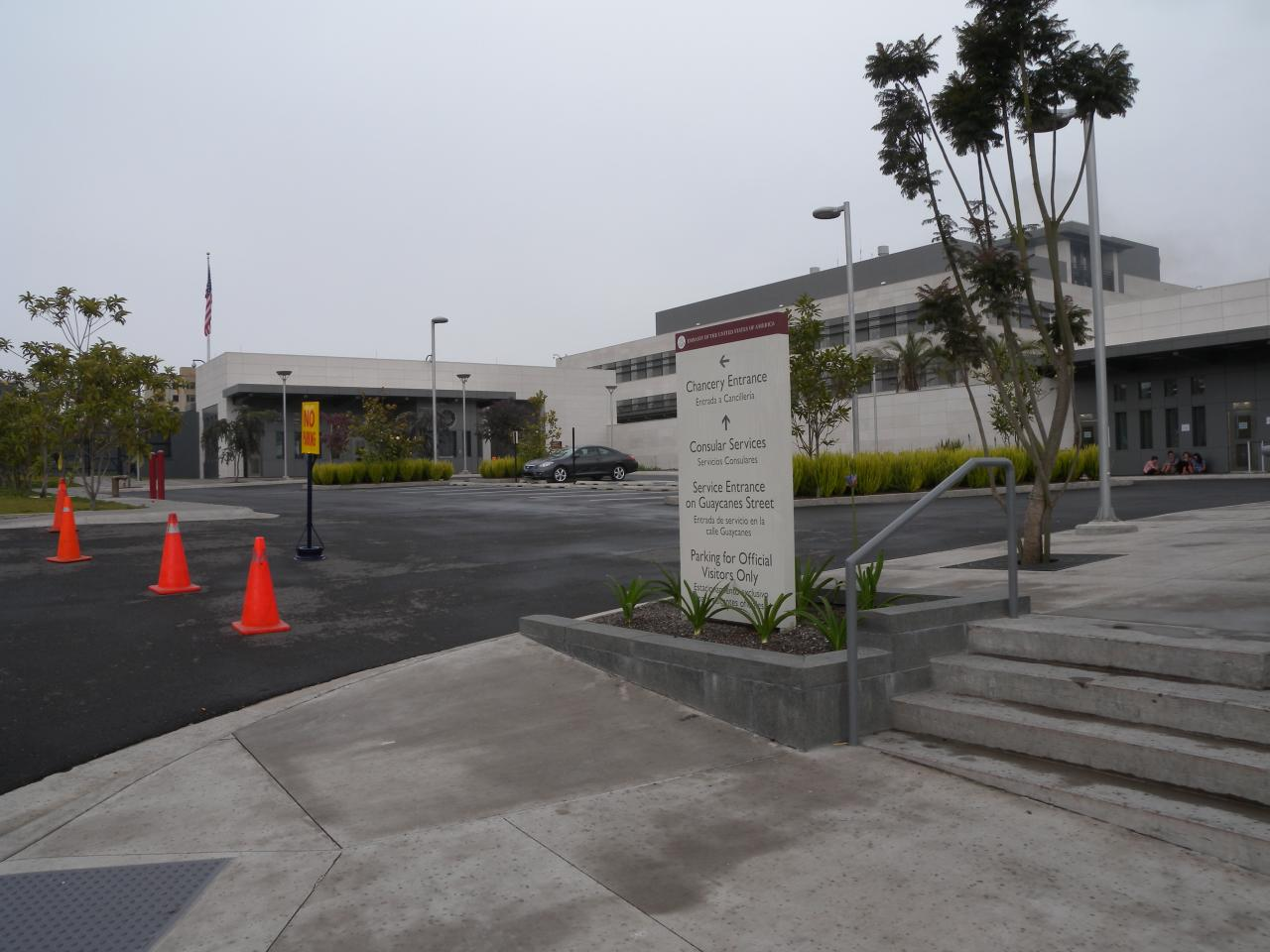
Embassy in Quito

Embassy in San José

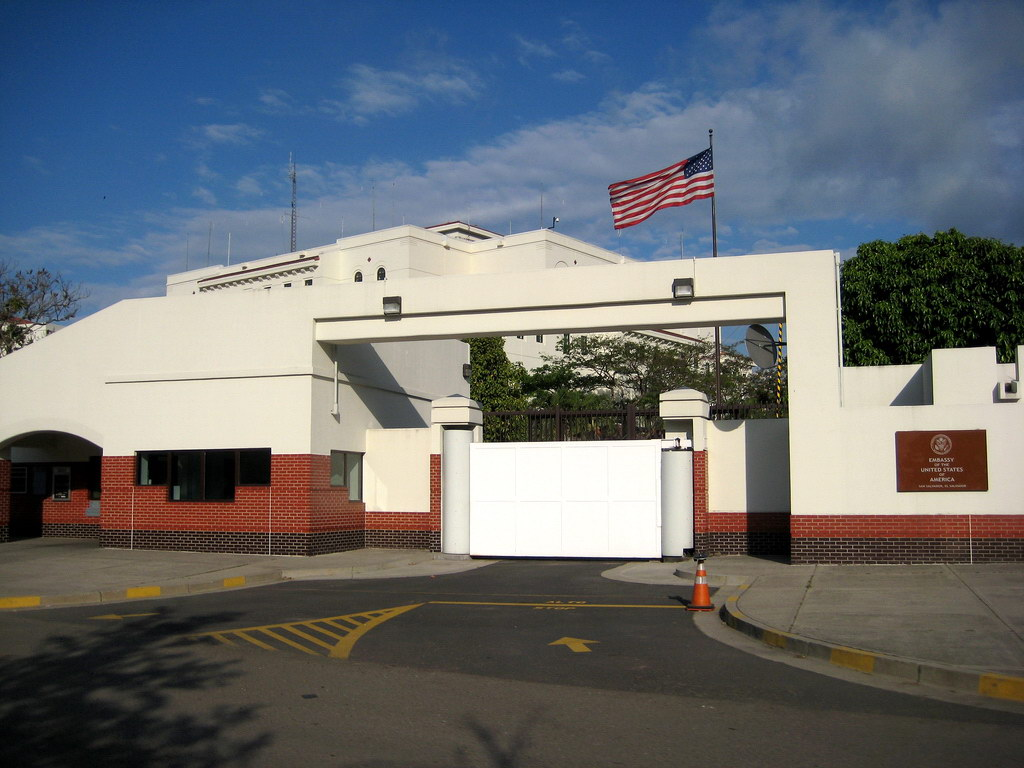
Embassy in San Salvador

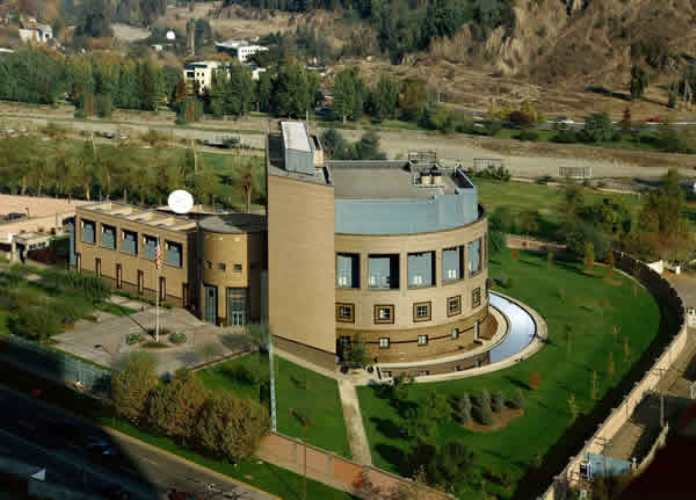
Embassy in Santiago de Chile

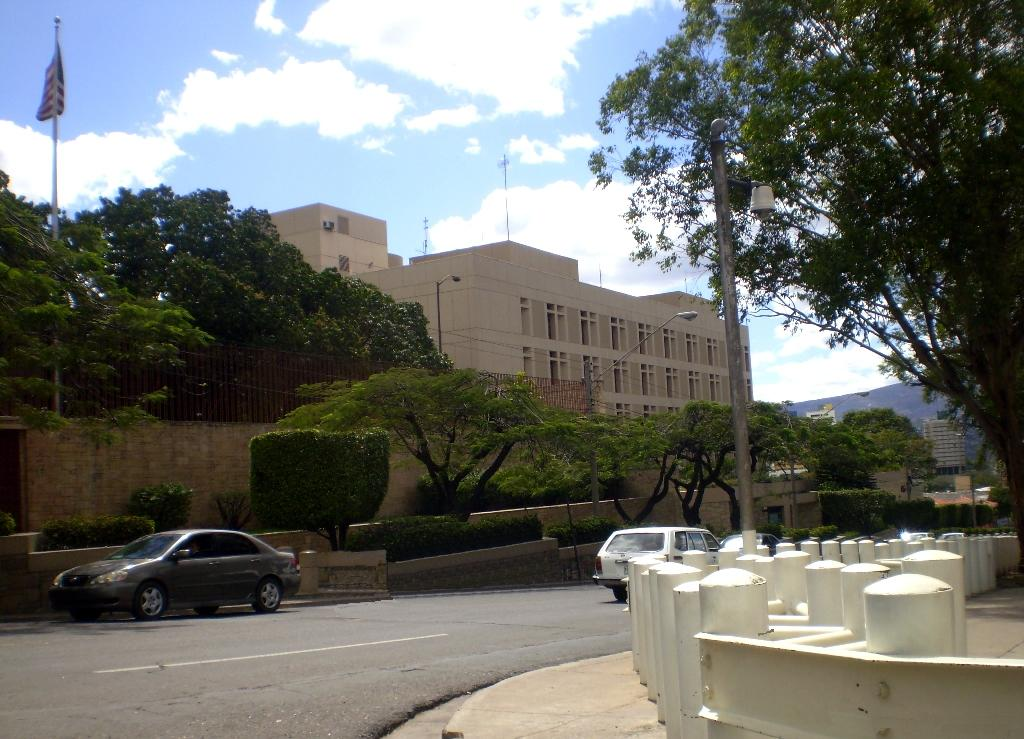
Embassy in Tegucigalpa

=== Asia ===
The U.S. has embassies in all Asian countries it recognizes apart from Afghanistan, Bhutan, Iran, North Korea, Syria, and Yemen. It has 'interests sections' in other nations' embassies in Afghanistan, Iran, North Korea, and Syria. It also has a de facto embassy in Taiwan.

Host country	Host city	Mission	Concurrent accreditation	Ref.
Afghanistan	Kabul	Interests Section (Note: Under the protecting power of Qatar.)		
Armenia	Yerevan	Embassy		
Azerbaijan	Baku	Embassy		
Bahrain	Manama	Embassy		
Bangladesh	Dhaka	Embassy		
Brunei	Bandar Seri Begawan	Embassy		
Cambodia	Phnom Penh	Embassy		
China	Beijing	Embassy	Countries: Consular jurisdiction only: North Korea (Note: The United States does not have diplomatic relations with North Korea, and as such has its interests represented by Sweden, through its embassy in Pyongyang. Nonetheless, the US Embassy in Beijing attends to consular needs of US citizens in North Korea.)	
China	Guangzhou	Consulate General	Countries: Consular jurisdiction only: North Korea	
China	Shanghai	Consulate General	Countries: Consular jurisdiction only: North Korea	
China	Shenyang	Consulate General	Countries: Consular jurisdiction only: North Korea	
China	Wuhan	Consulate General	Countries: Consular jurisdiction only: North Korea	
China	Hong Kong	Consulate General (Note: Although Hong Kong and Macau are recognized as sovereign territory of China, their status as Special Administrative Regions grants these two territories substantial autonomy such that the Consulate General of the US (and numerous other missions to China) in Hong Kong arranges this post as a separate representation headed by a Chief of Mission with the title of "Ambassador" (as opposed to a subordinate "Consul General") who reports directly to the State Department, bypassing the Embassy in Beijing.)	Countries: Consular jurisdiction only: North Korea	
Georgia	Tbilisi	Embassy		
India	New Delhi	Embassy	Countries: Bhutan	
India	Chennai	Consulate General	Countries: Bhutan	
India	Hyderabad	Consulate General	Countries: Bhutan	
India	Kolkata	Consulate General	Countries: Bhutan	
India	Mumbai	Consulate General	Countries: Bhutan	
India	Bengaluru	Consulate	Countries: Bhutan	
Indonesia	Jakarta	Embassy		
Indonesia	Surabaya	Consulate General		
Indonesia	Medan	Consulate		
Indonesia	Badung	Consular Agency		
Iran	Tehran	Interests Section (Note: Under the protecting power of Switzerland.)		
Iraq	Baghdad	Embassy		
Iraq	Erbil	Consulate General		
Israel	Jerusalem	Embassy		
Israel	Tel Aviv	Embassy Branch Office		
Japan	Tokyo	Embassy		
Japan	Naha	Consulate General		
Japan	Osaka	Consulate General		
Japan	Sapporo	Consulate General		
Japan	Fukuoka	Consulate		
Japan	Nagoya	Consulate		
Jordan	Amman	Embassy		
Kazakhstan	Astana	Embassy		
Kazakhstan	Almaty	Consulate General		
Kuwait	Kuwait City	Embassy		
Kyrgyzstan	Bishkek	Embassy		
Laos	Vientiane	Embassy		
Lebanon	Beirut	Embassy		
Malaysia	Kuala Lumpur	Embassy		
Maldives	Malé	Mission		
Mongolia	Ulaanbaatar	Embassy		
Myanmar	Yangon	Embassy		
Nepal	Kathmandu	Embassy		
Oman	Muscat	Embassy		
Pakistan	Islamabad	Embassy		
Pakistan	Karachi	Consulate General		
Pakistan	Lahore	Consulate General		
Pakistan	Peshawar	Consulate General		
Philippines	Manila	Embassy		
Philippines	Cebu City	Consular Agency		
Qatar	Doha	Embassy		
Saudi Arabia	Riyadh	Embassy	Countries: Yemen (Note: The U.S. Embassy in Sanaa suspended operations on February 11, 2015, in the midst of the Yemeni civil war; however, the United States did not sever diplomatic relations with Yemen. Working from the U.S. Embassy in Riyadh, Saudi Arabia under the authority of the U.S. Ambassador to Yemen, U.S. diplomats in the Yemen Affairs Unit maintained regular dialogue with the Republic of Yemen Government.)	
Saudi Arabia	Dhahran	Consulate General	Countries: Yemen	
Saudi Arabia	Jeddah	Consulate General	Countries: Yemen	
Singapore	Singapore	Embassy		
South Korea	Seoul	Embassy		
South Korea	Busan	Consulate		
Sri Lanka	Colombo	Embassy		
Taiwan (Note: The United States does not formally recognize the Republic of China on Taiwan. Unofficial relations are conducted through the American Institute in Taiwan, a de facto embassy.)	Taipei	American Institute		
Taiwan	Kaohsiung	Branch Office		
Tajikistan	Dushanbe	Embassy		
Thailand	Bangkok	Embassy		
Thailand	Chiang Mai	Consulate General		
Timor Leste	Dili	Embassy		
Turkey	Ankara	Embassy		
Turkey	Istanbul	Consulate General		
Turkey	Adana	Consulate		
Turkey	Izmir	Consular Agency		
Turkey	Gaziantep	Branch Office		
Turkmenistan	Ashgabat	Embassy		
United Arab Emirates	Abu Dhabi	Embassy		
United Arab Emirates	Dubai	Consulate General		
Uzbekistan	Tashkent	Embassy		
Vietnam	Hanoi	Embassy		
Vietnam	Ho Chi Minh City	Consulate General		

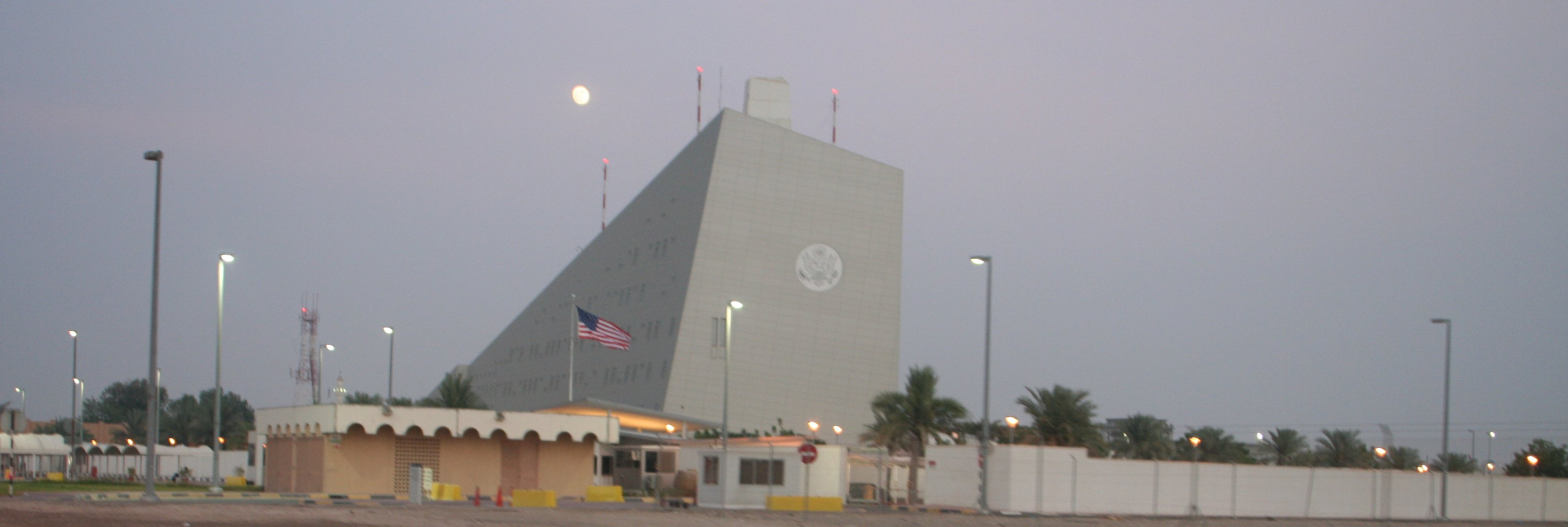
Embassy in Abu Dhabi

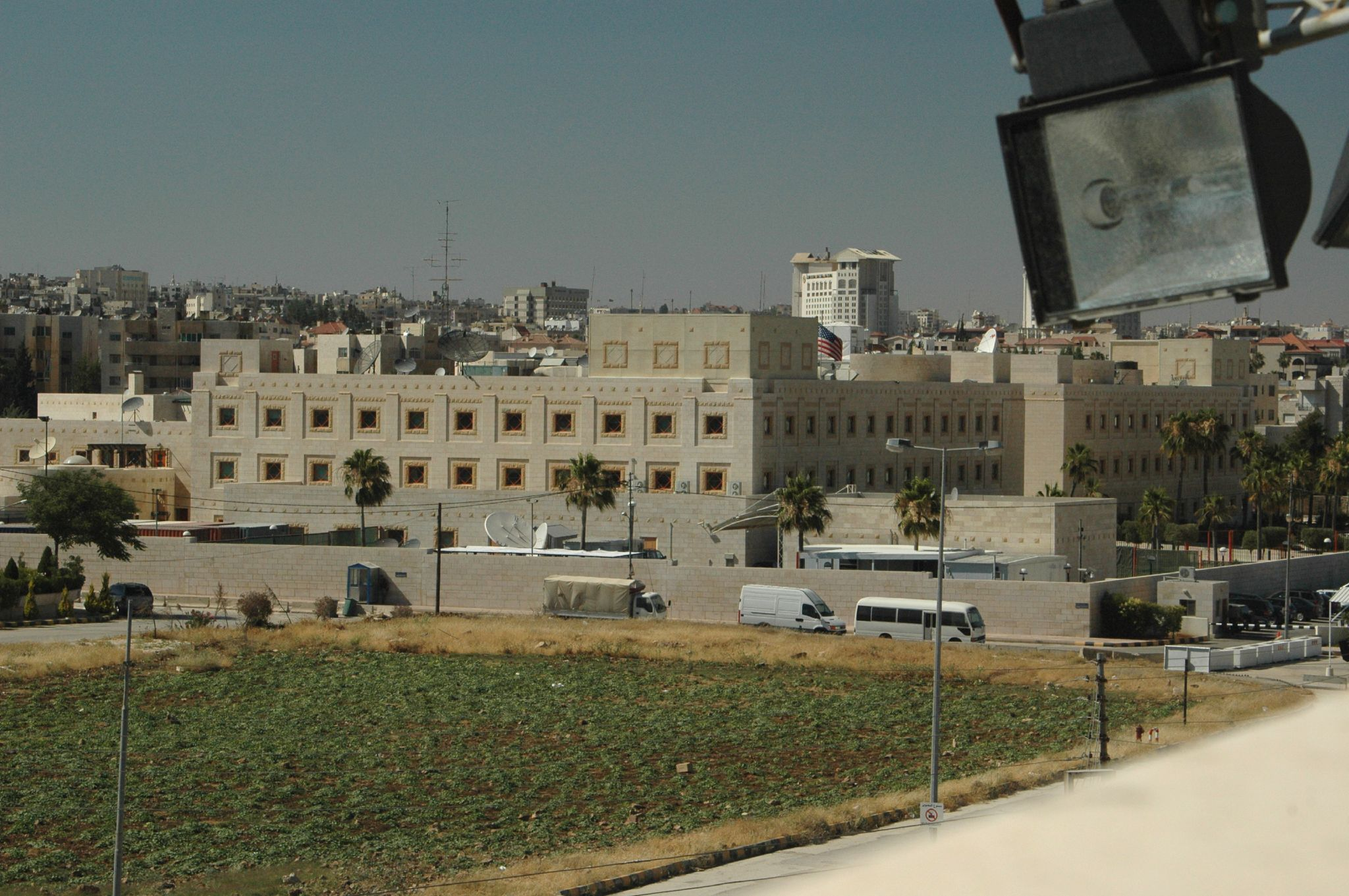
Embassy in Amman

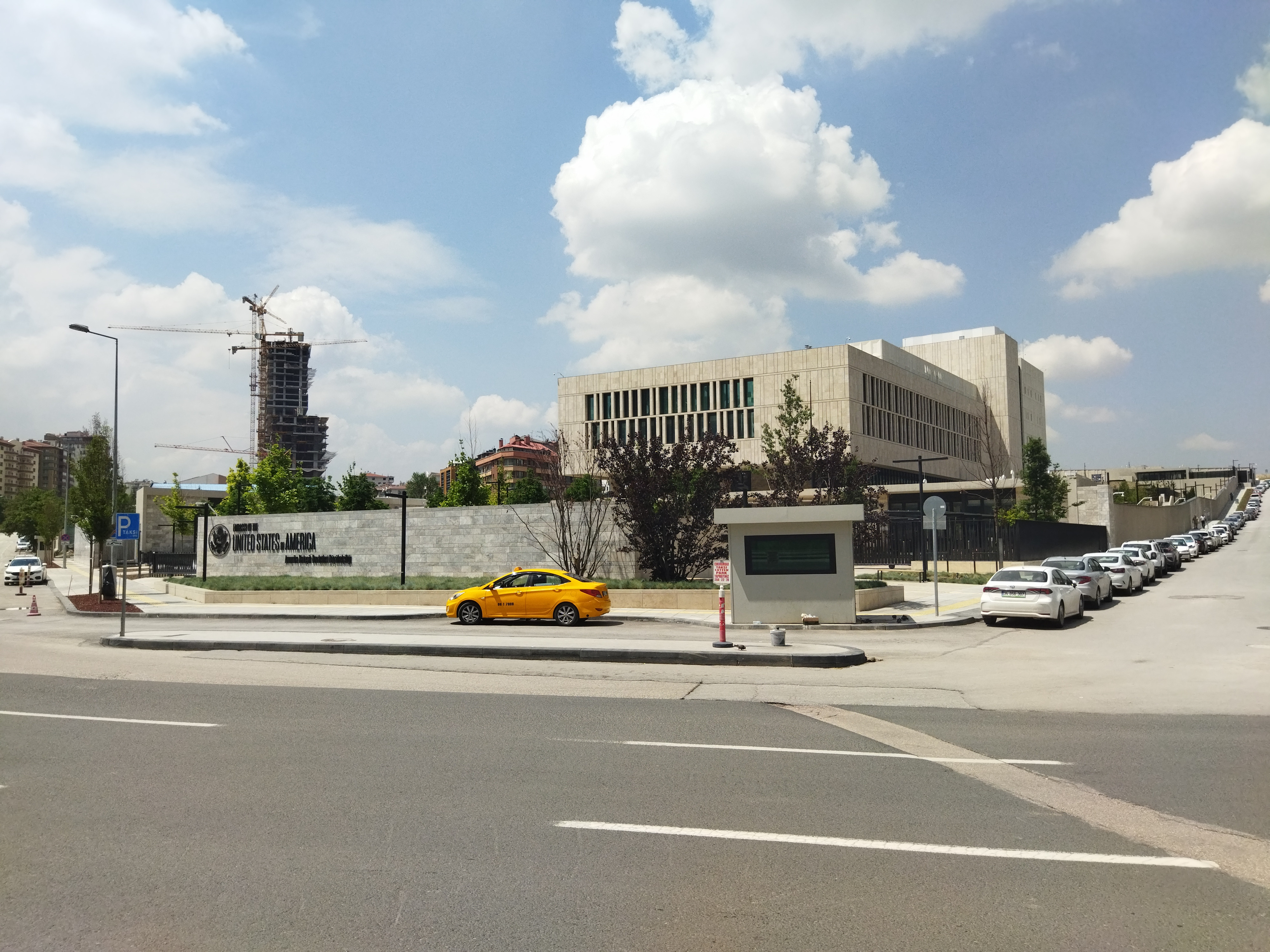
Embassy in Ankara

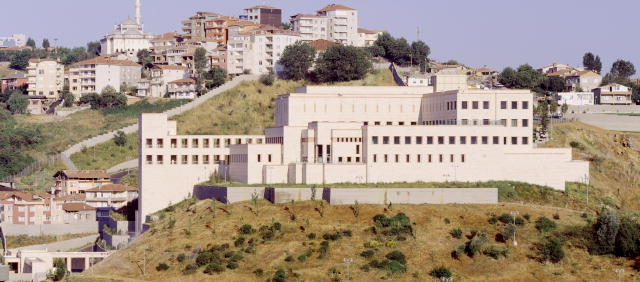
Consulate-General in Istanbul

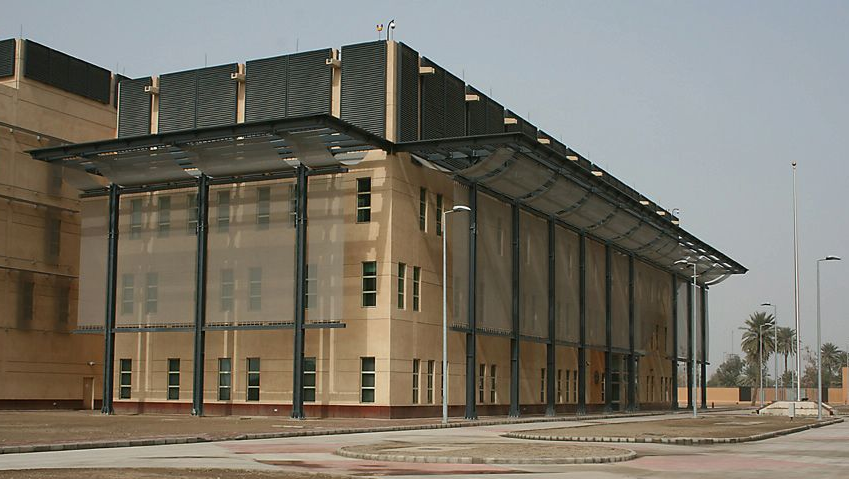
Embassy in Baghdad

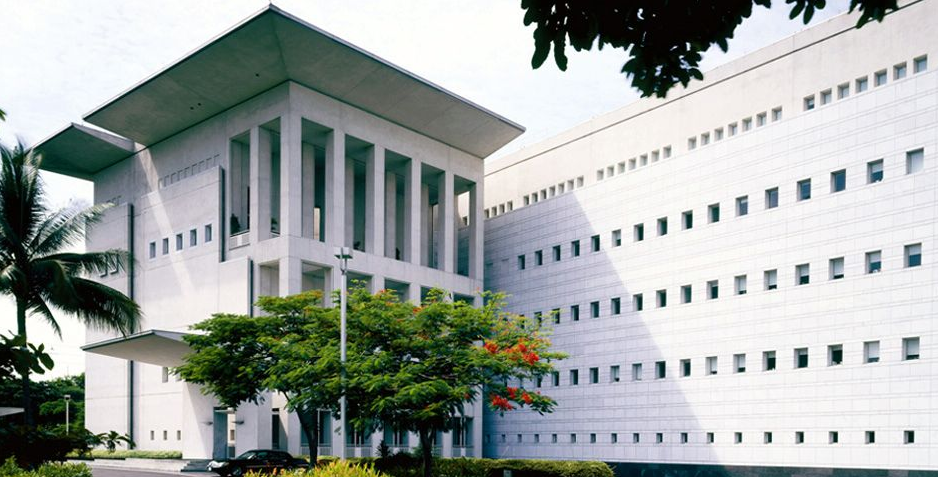
Embassy in Bangkok

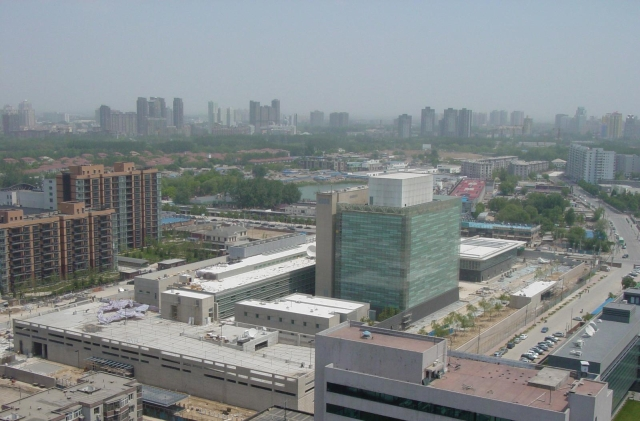
Embassy in Beijing

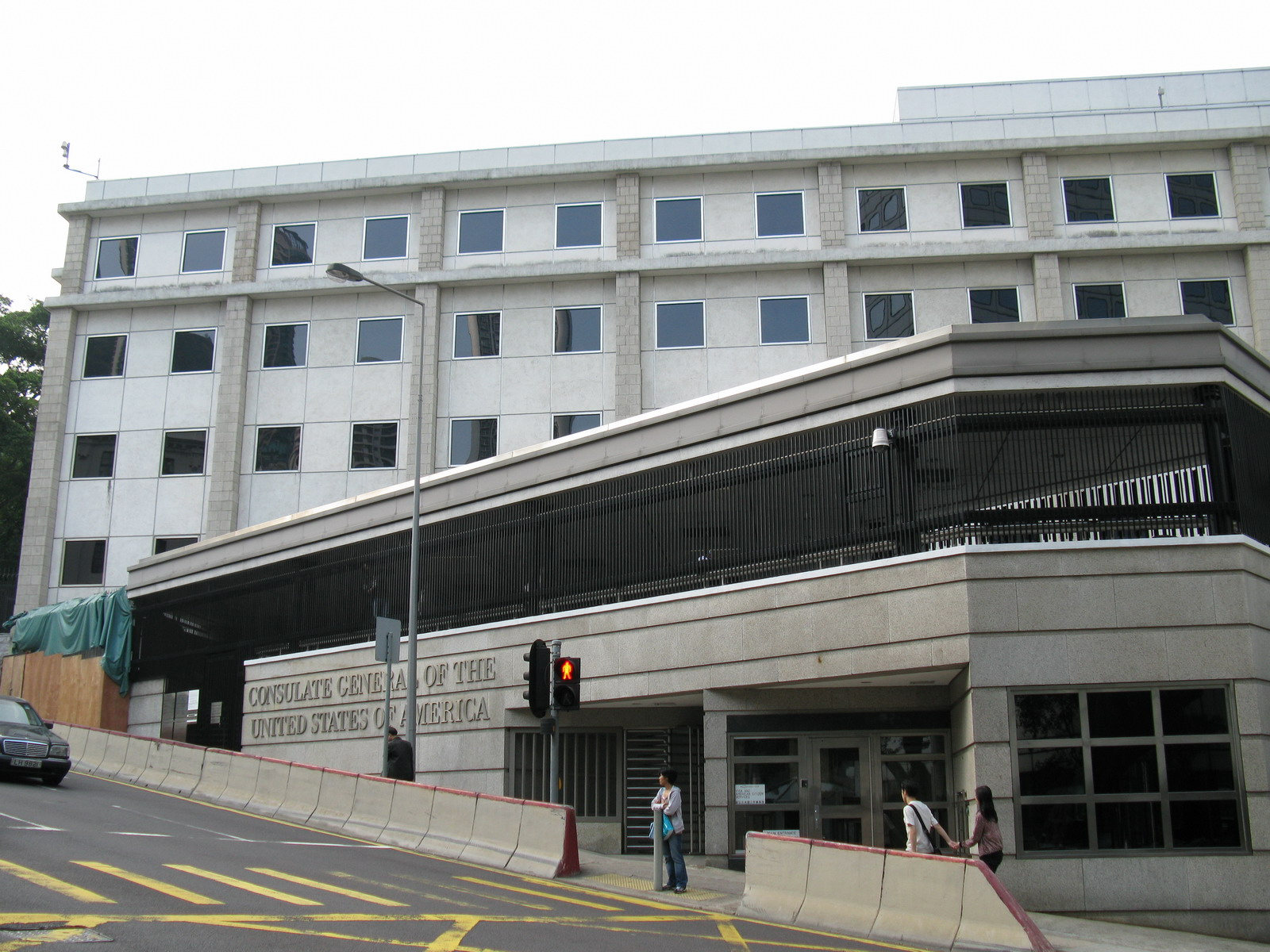
Consulate-General in Hong Kong

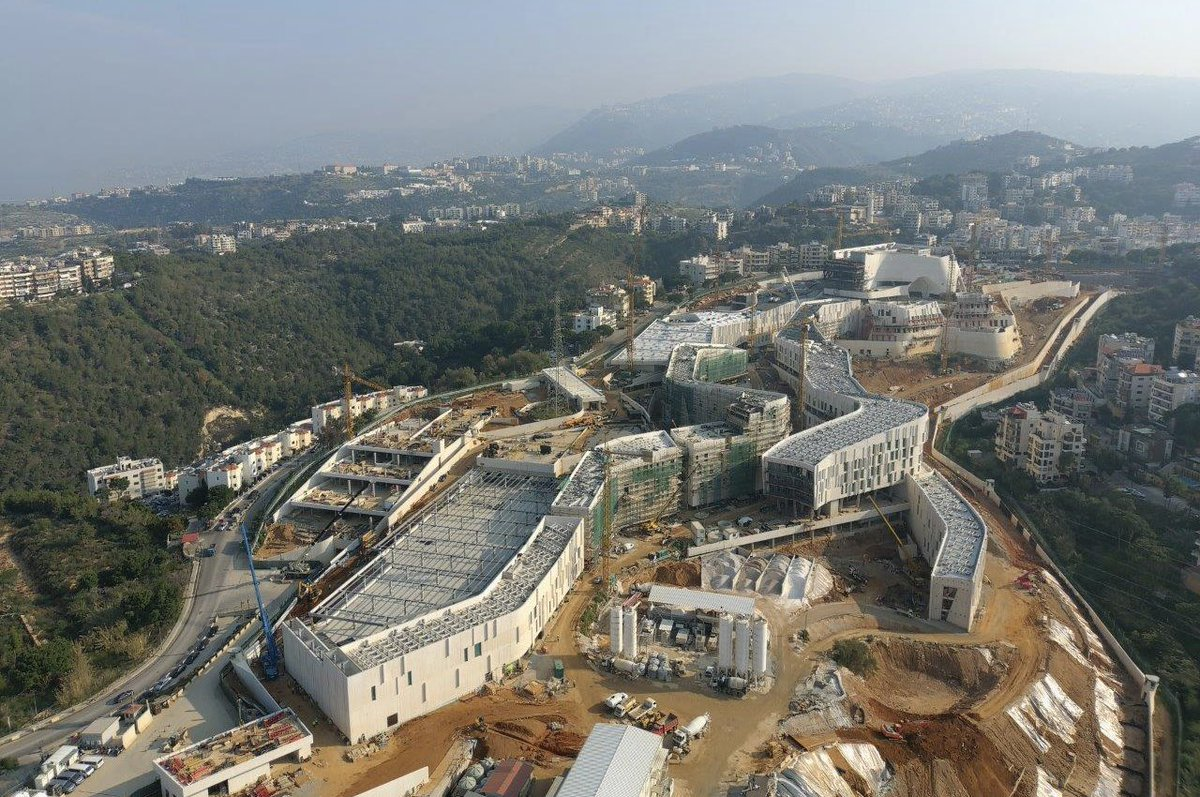
New Embassy in Beirut (under construction)

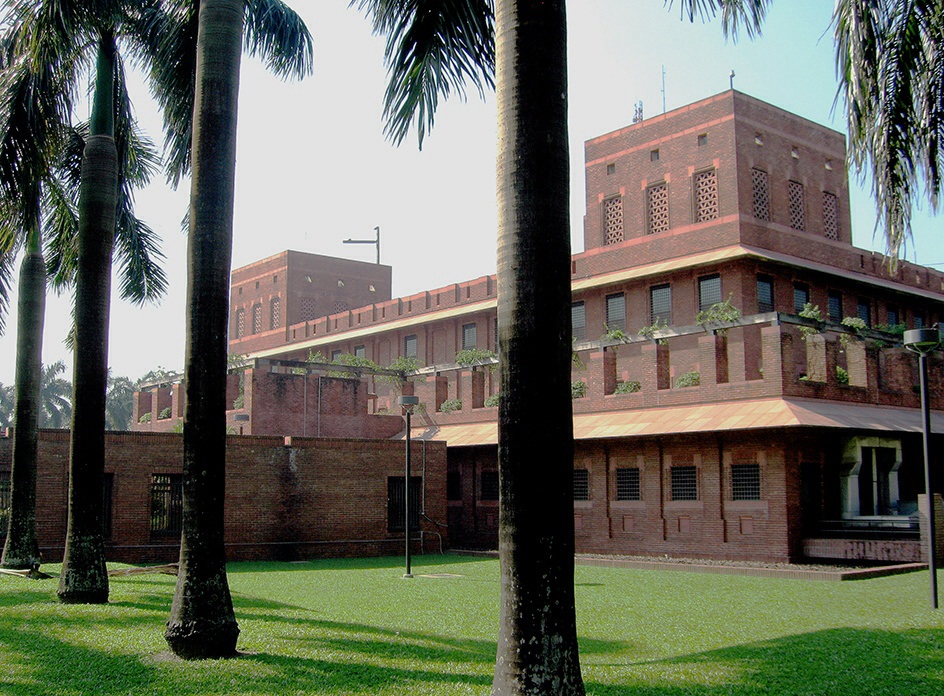
Embassy in Dhaka

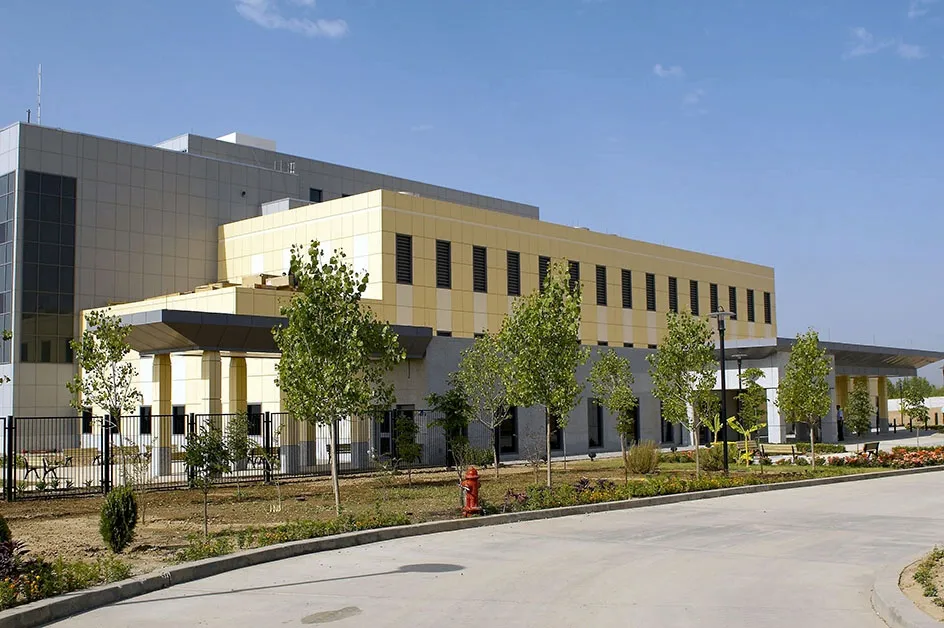
Embassy in Dushanbe

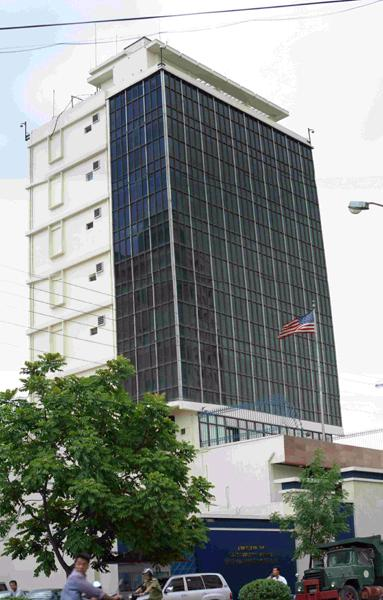
Embassy in Hanoi

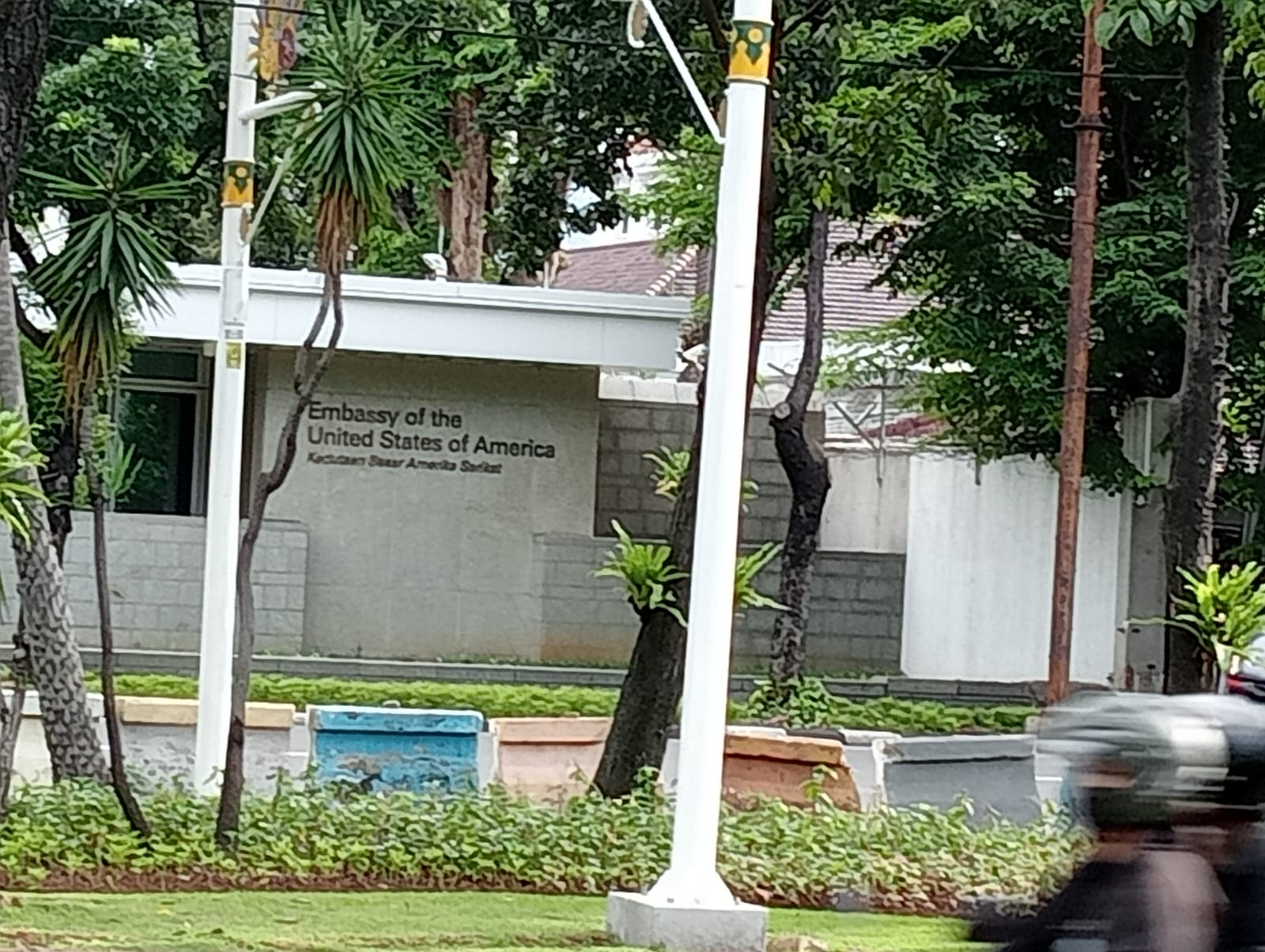
Embassy in Jakarta

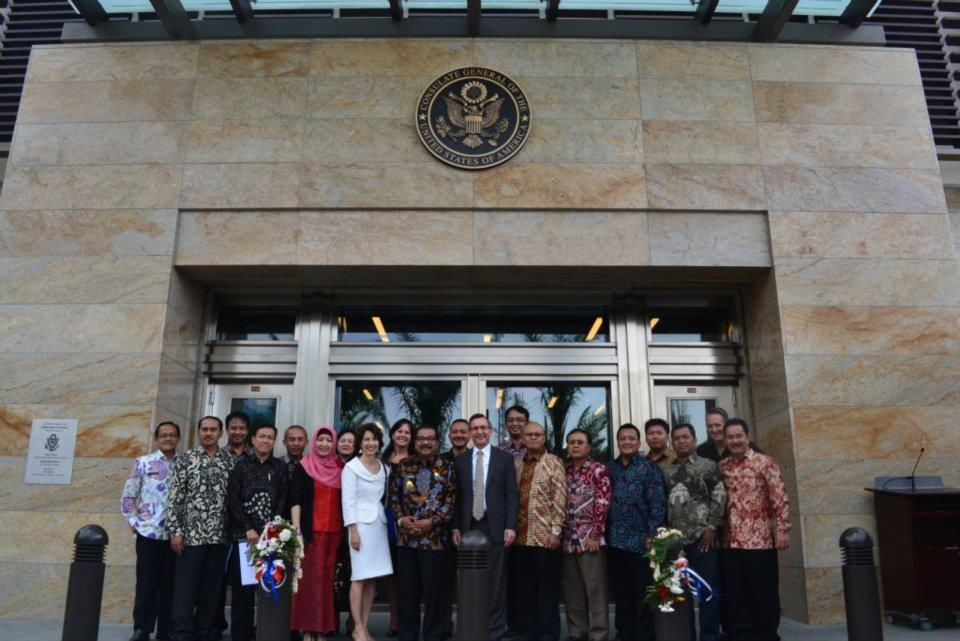
Consulate General in Surabaya

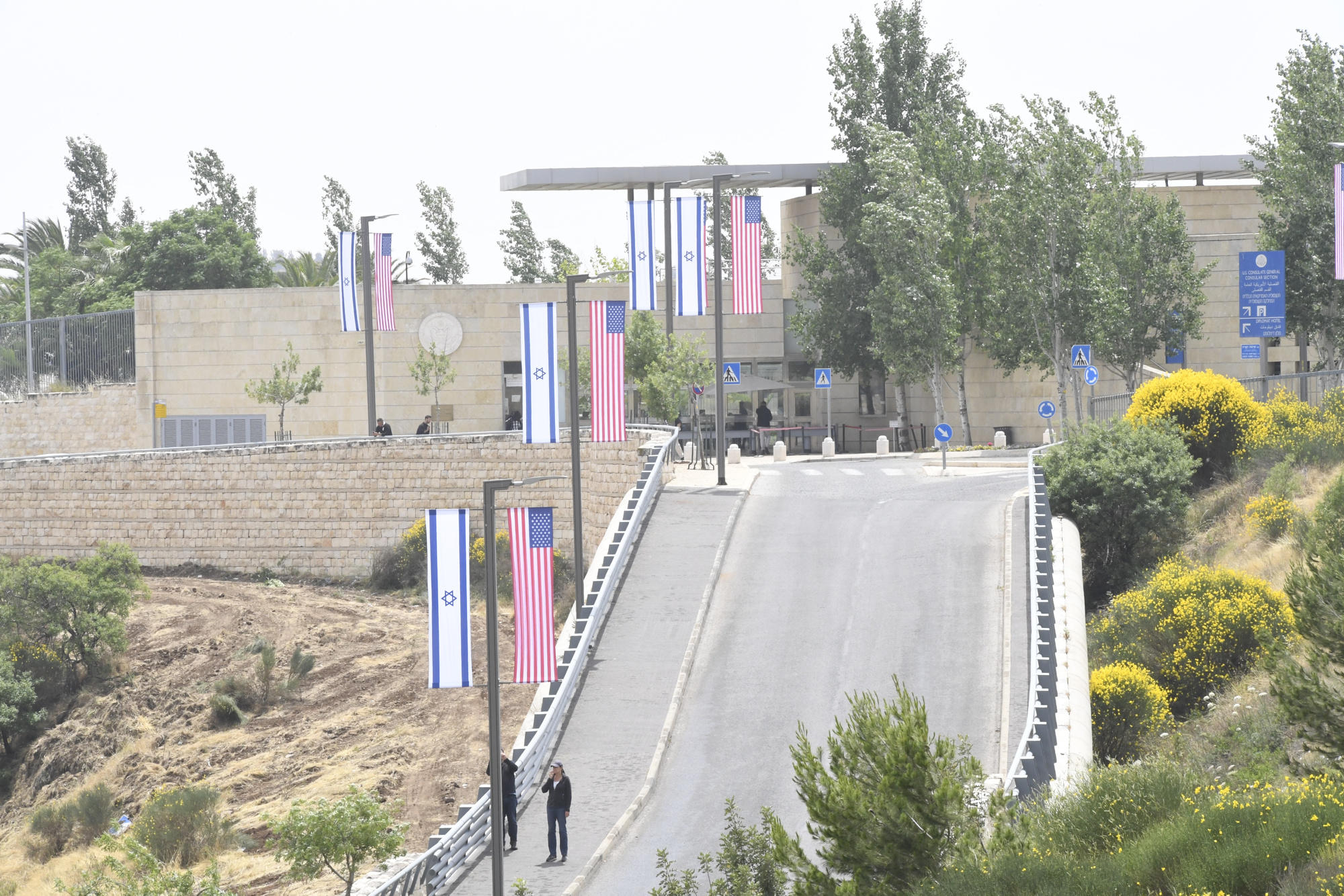
Embassy in Jerusalem

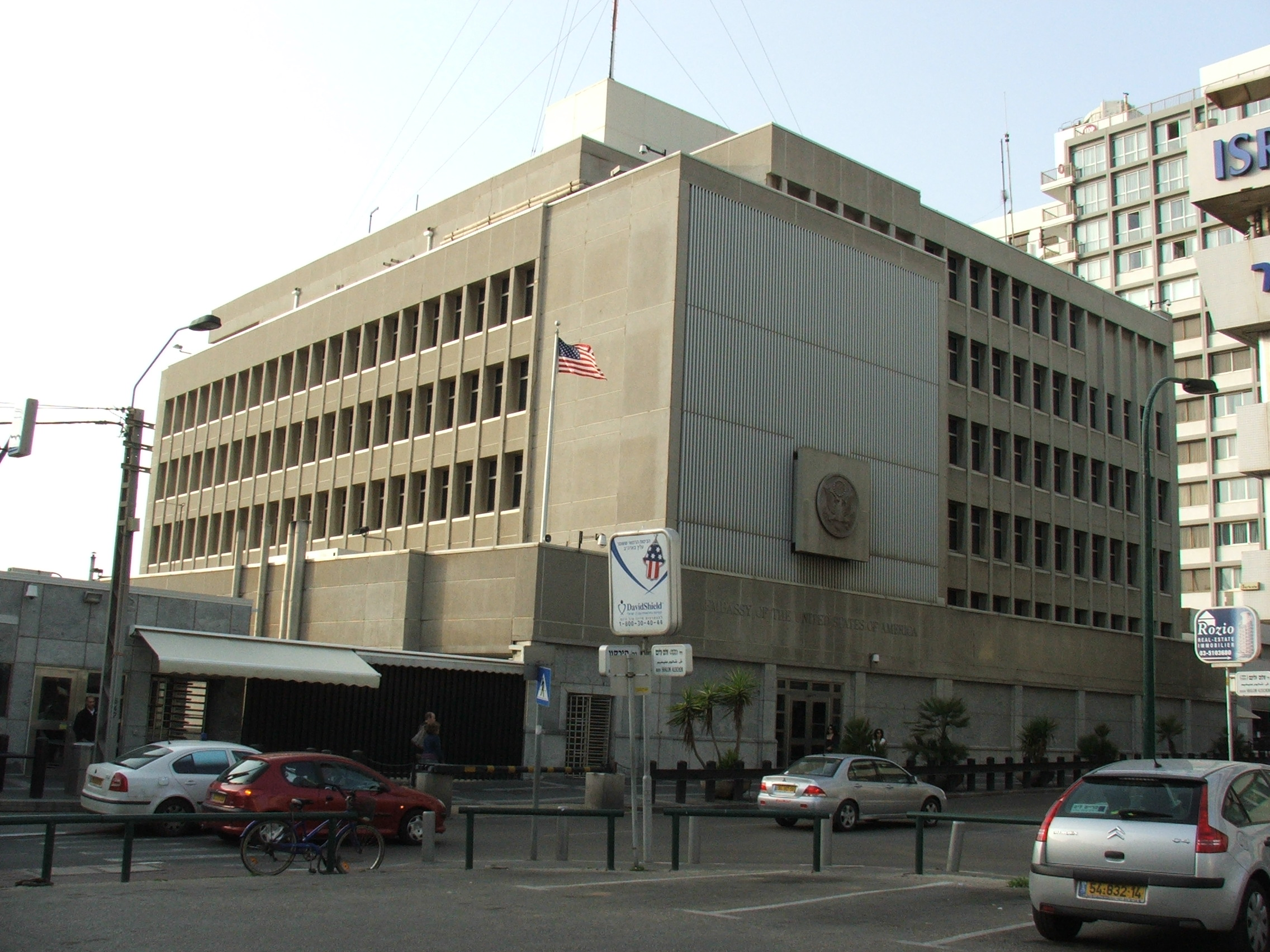
Embassy Branch Office in Tel Aviv

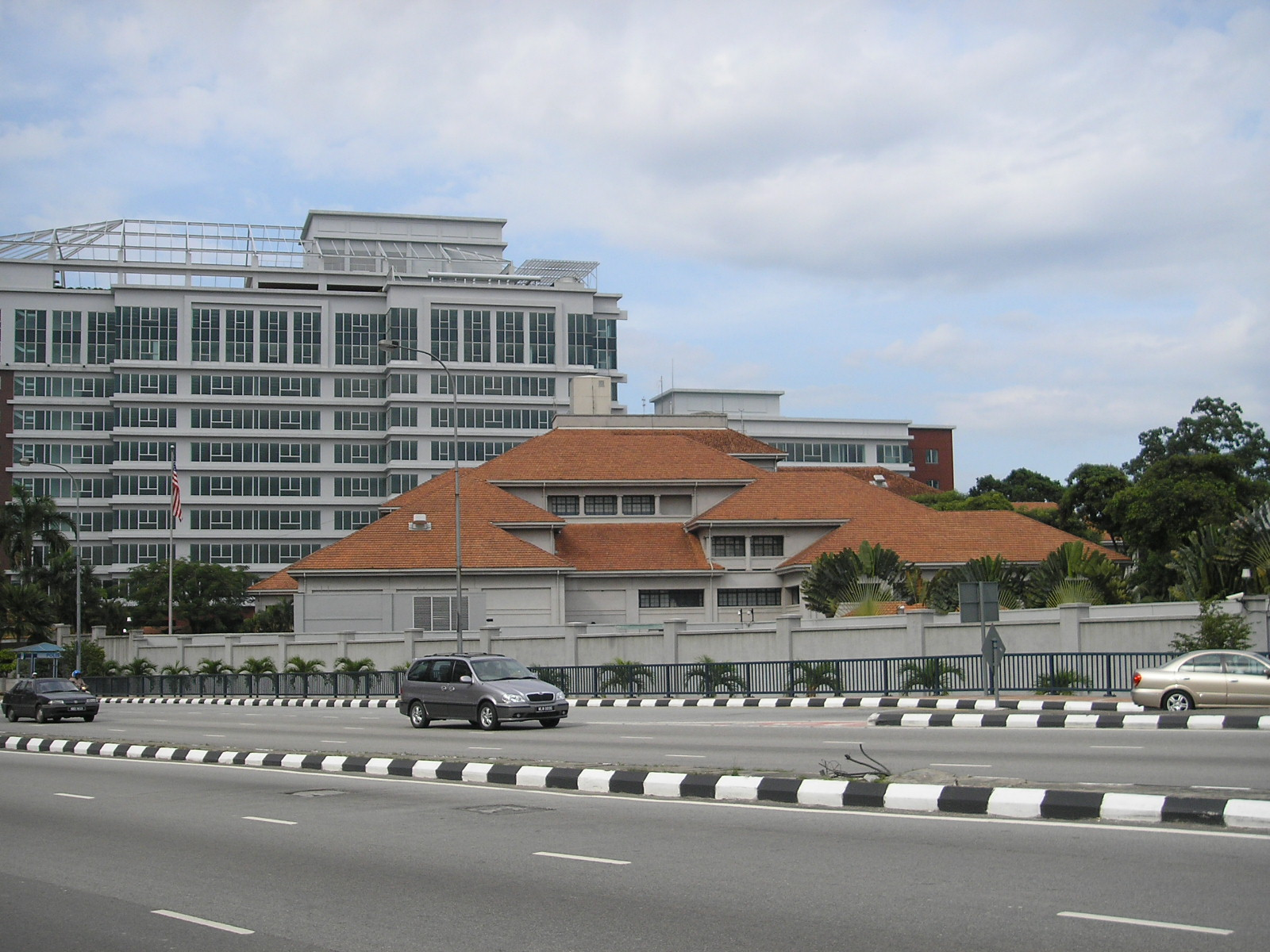
Embassy in Kuala Lumpur

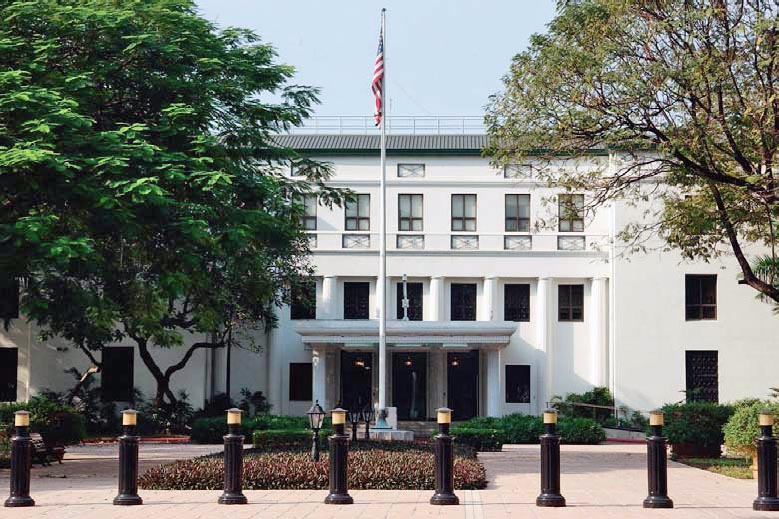
Embassy in Manila

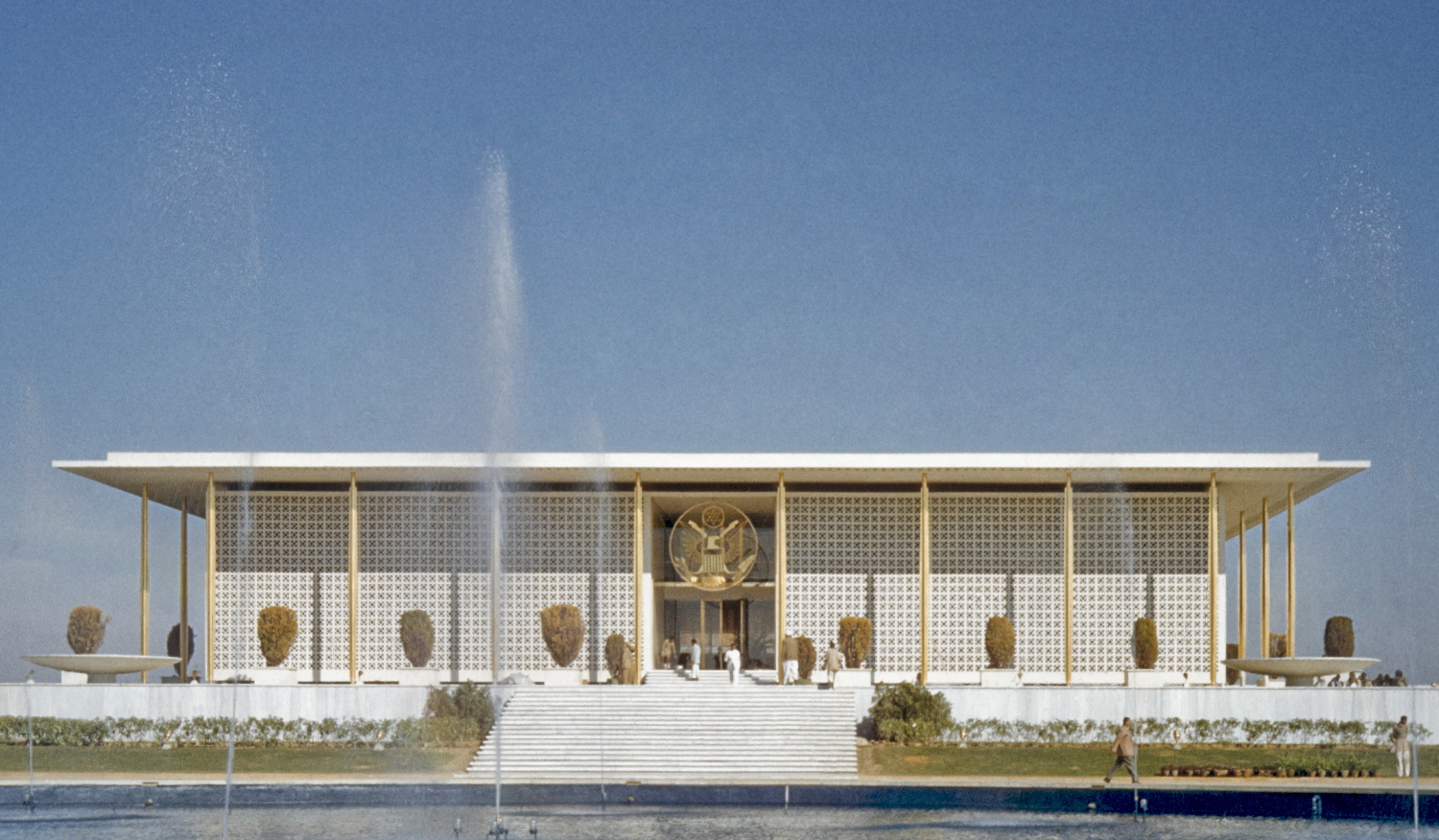
Embassy in New Delhi

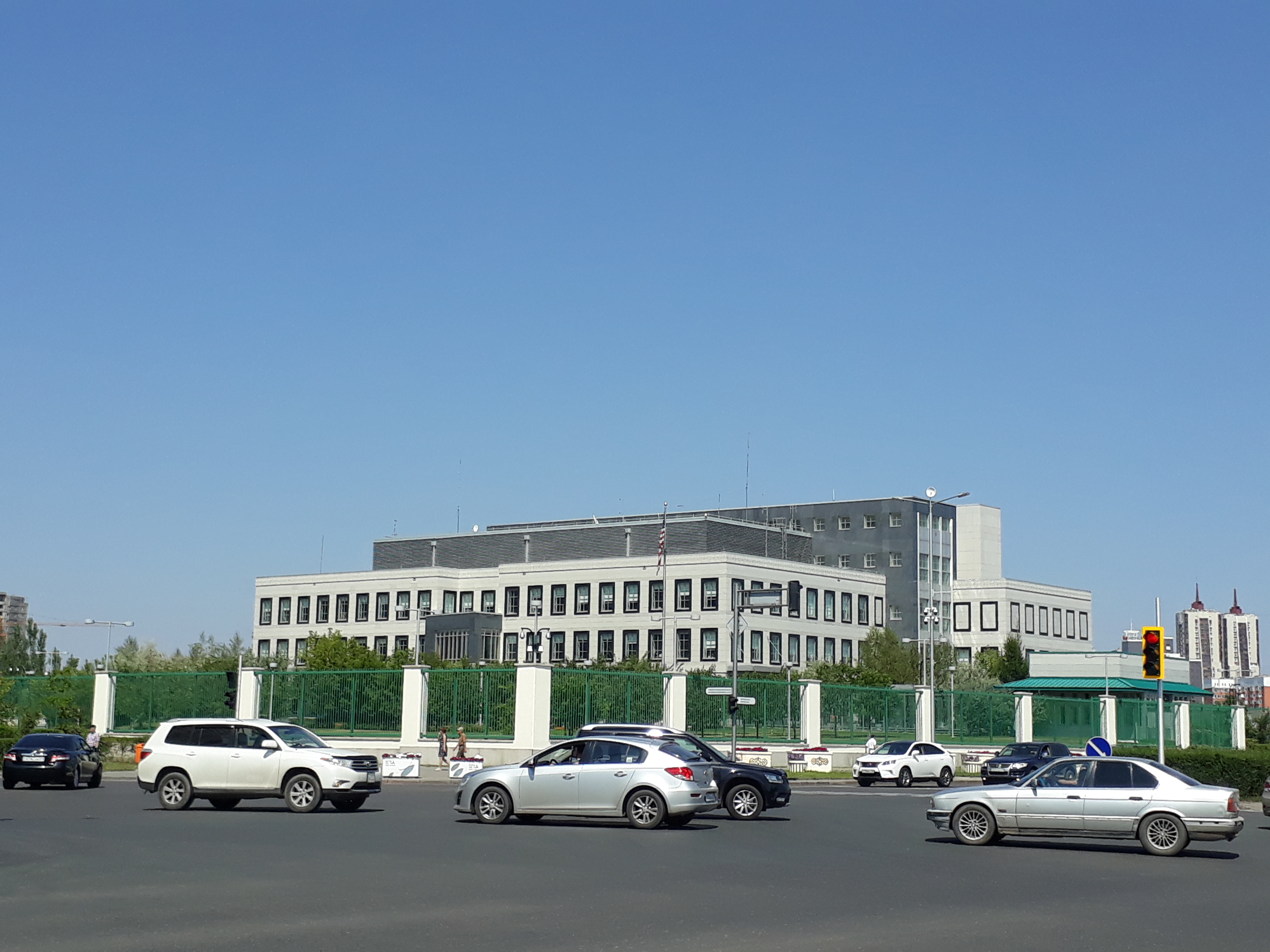
Embassy in Astana

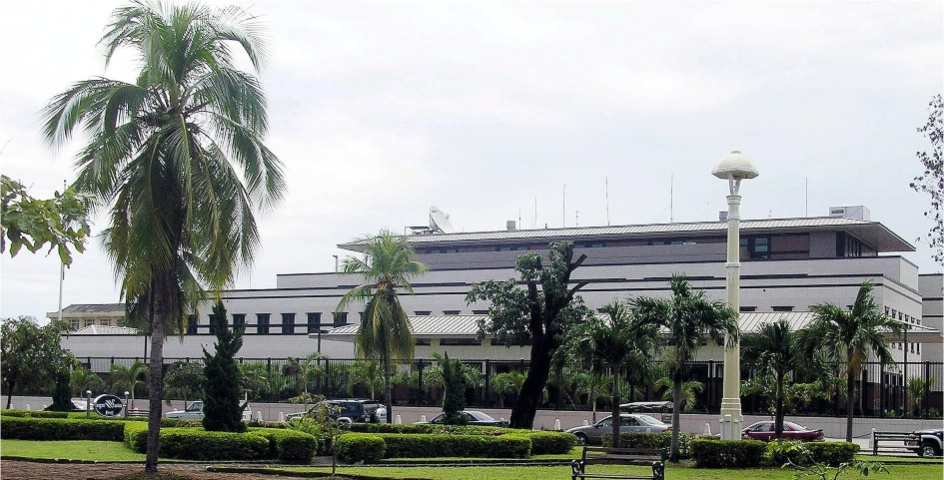
Embassy in Phnom Penh

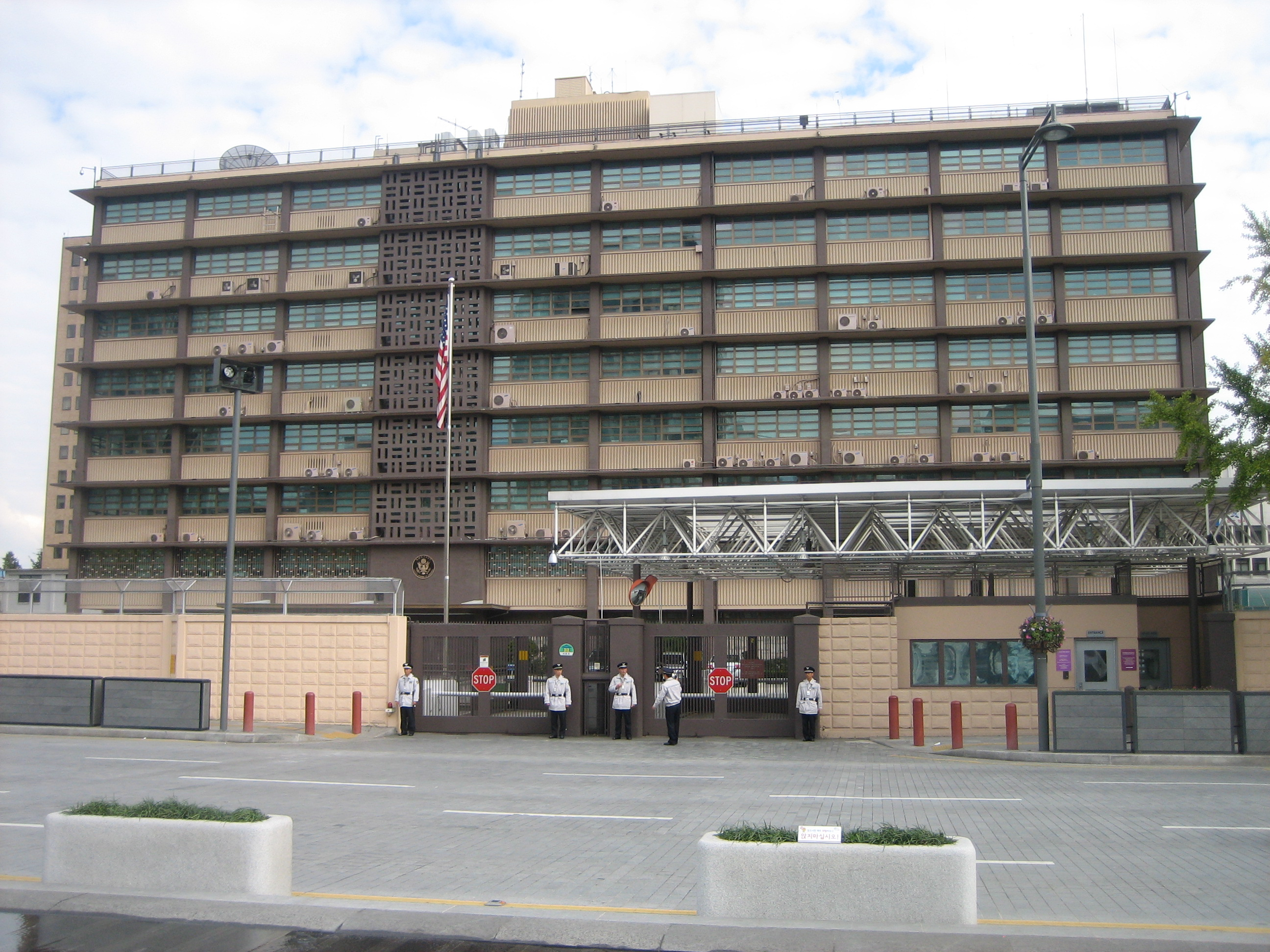
Embassy in Seoul

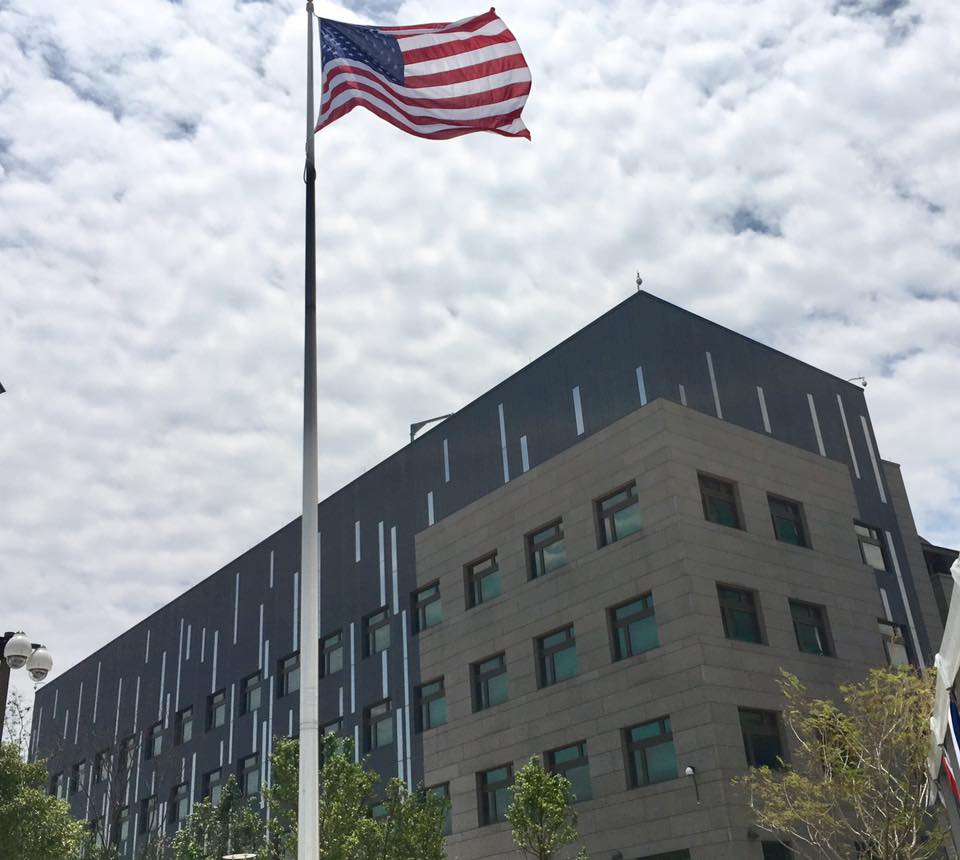
American Institute in Taipei

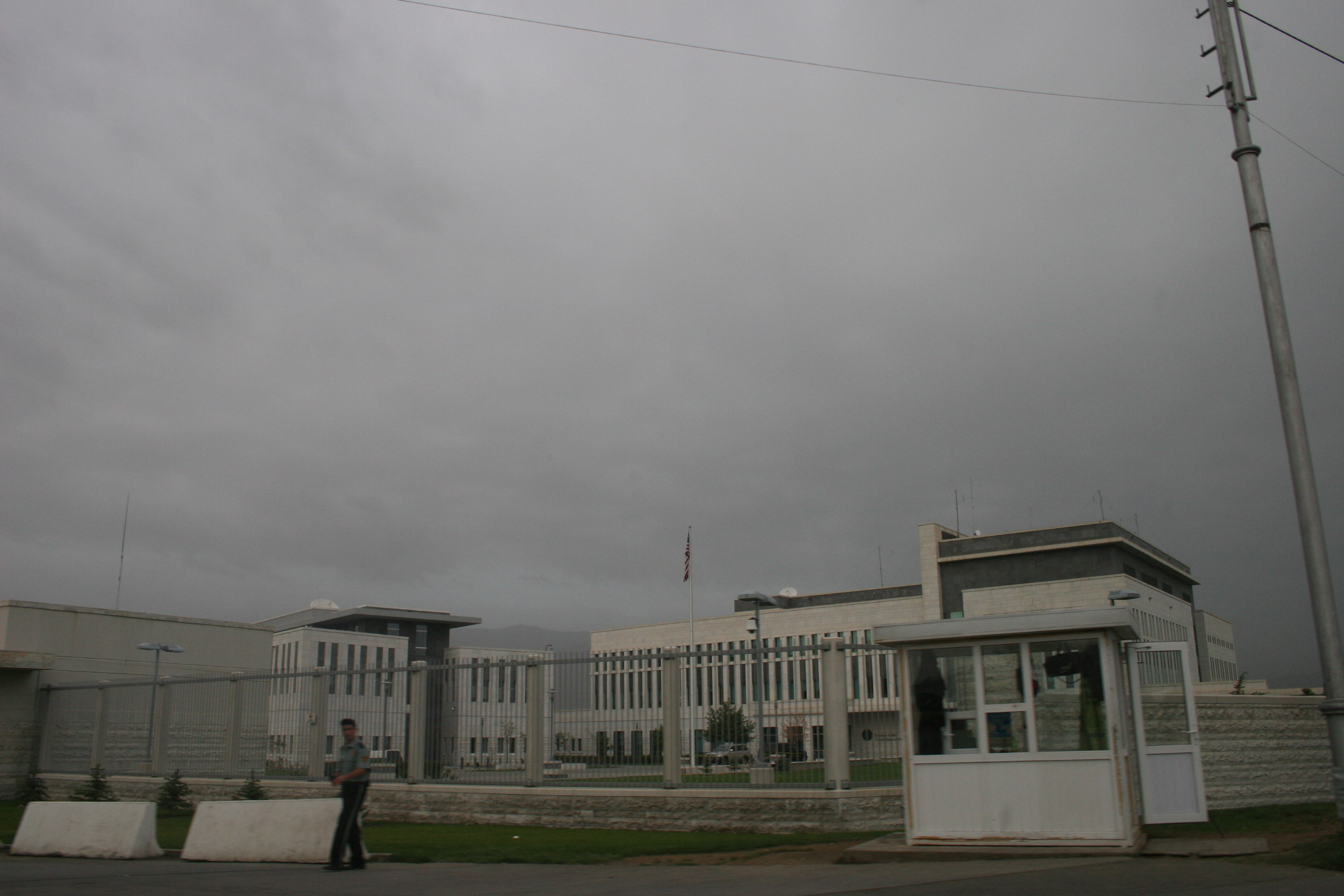
Embassy in Tbilisi

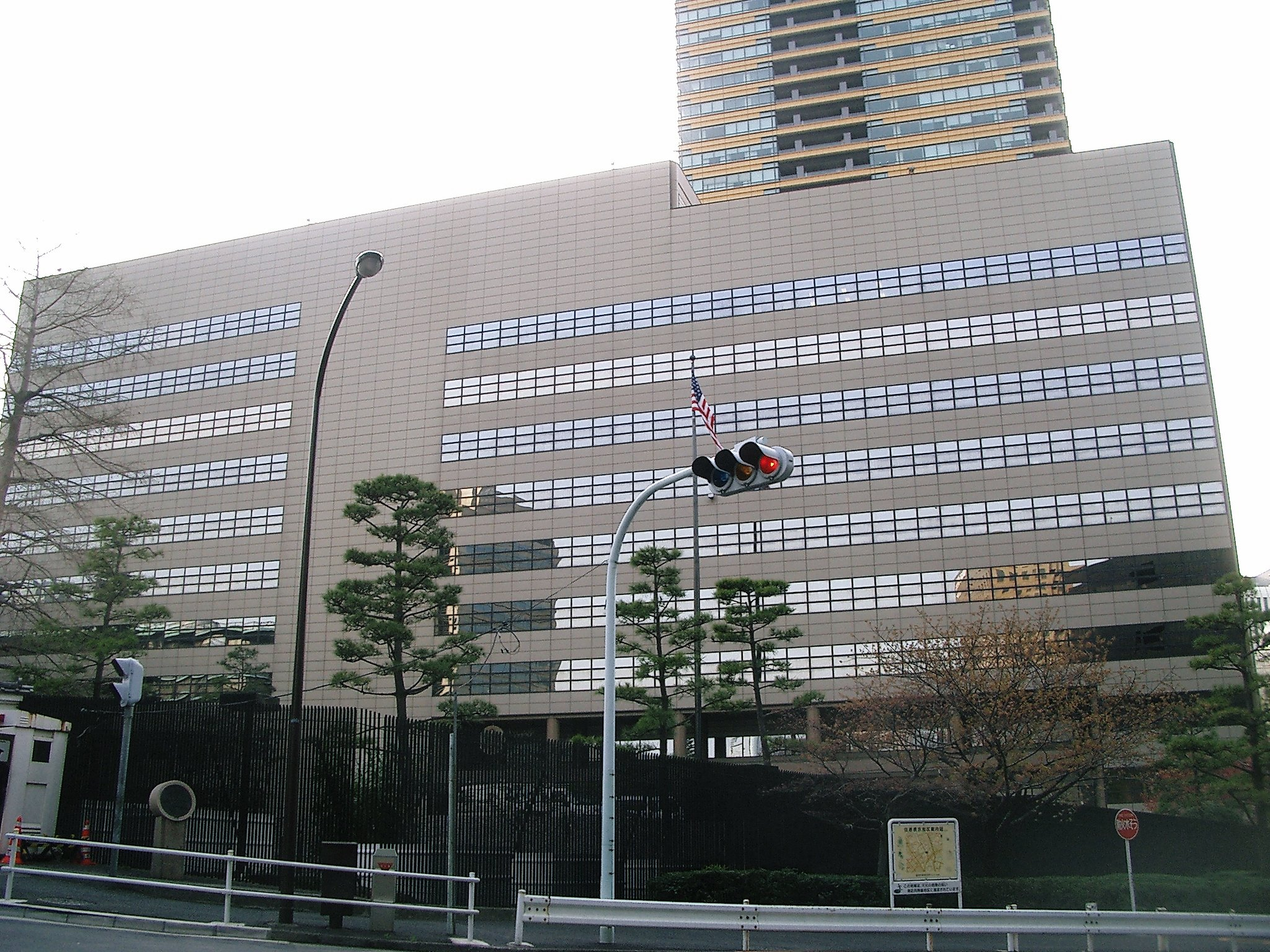
Embassy in Tokyo

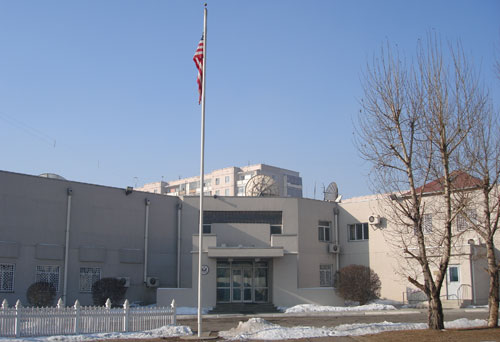
Embassy in Ulaanbaatar

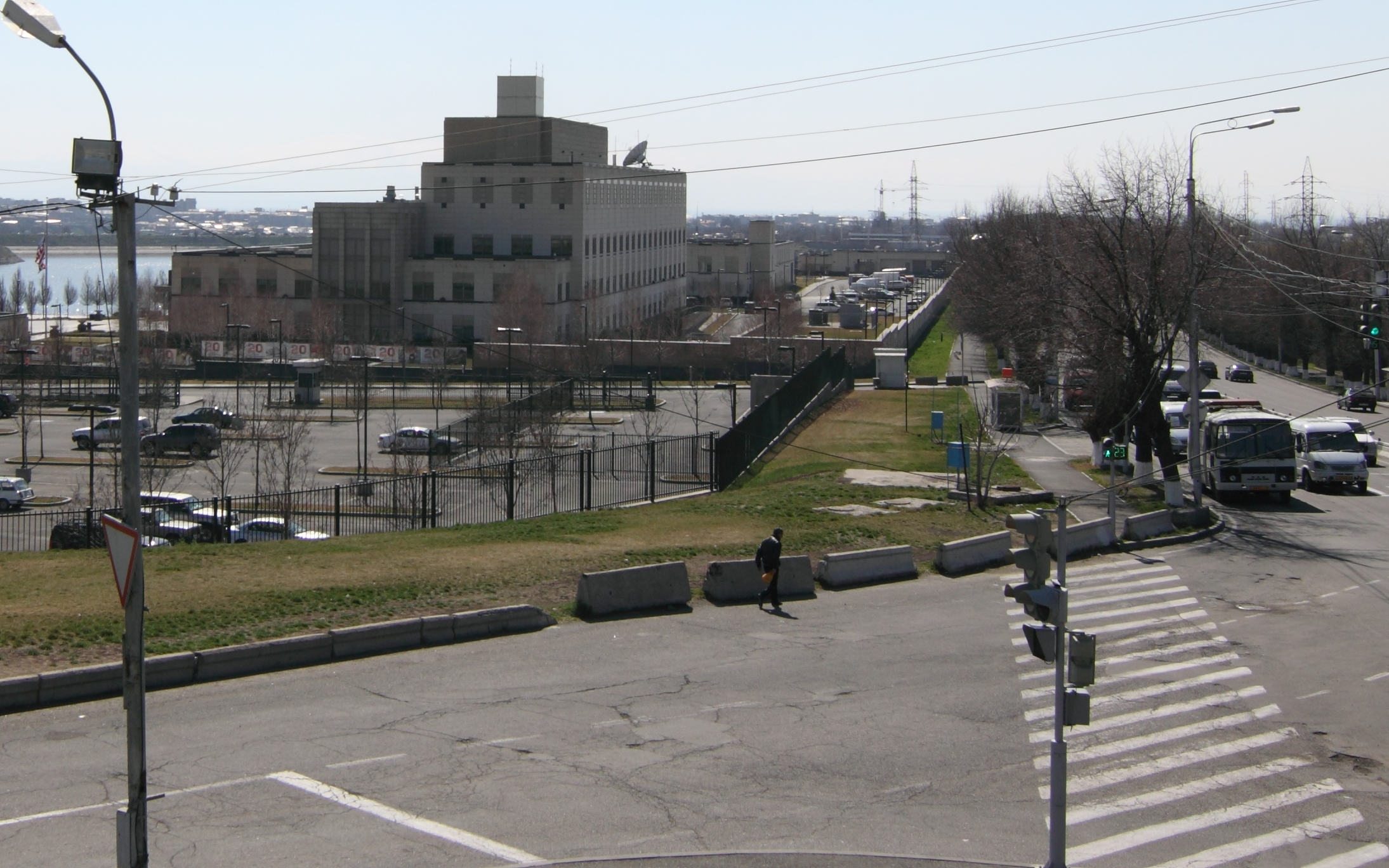
Embassy in Yerevan

=== Europe ===
The U.S. has embassies in (or, in the case of Vatican City, near) all European countries it recognizes apart from Andorra, Liechtenstein, Monaco, and San Marino.

Host country	Host city	Mission	Concurrent accreditation	Ref.
Albania	Tirana	Embassy		
Austria	Vienna	Embassy		
Belgium	Brussels	Embassy		
Bosnia and Herzegovina	Sarajevo	Embassy		
Bosnia and Herzegovina	Banja Luka	Embassy Branch Office		
Bosnia and Herzegovina	Mostar	Embassy Branch Office		
Bulgaria	Sofia	Embassy		
Croatia	Zagreb	Embassy		
Cyprus	Nicosia	Embassy		
Czech Republic	Prague	Embassy		
Denmark	Copenhagen	Embassy		
Denmark	Nuuk, Greenland	Consulate		
Estonia	Tallinn	Embassy		
Finland	Helsinki	Embassy		
France	Paris	Embassy		
France	Bordeaux	Consulate General		
France	Lyon	Consulate General		
France	Marseille	Consulate General	Countries: Monaco	
France	Rennes	Consulate General		
France	Strasbourg	Consulate General	International Organization: Council of Europe (Note: Accredited as an observer mission)	
Germany	Berlin	Embassy		
Germany	Düsseldorf	Consulate General		
Germany	Frankfurt	Consulate General		
Germany	Hamburg	Consulate General		
Germany	Leipzig	Consulate General		
Germany	Munich	Consulate General		
Greece	Athens	Embassy		
Greece	Thessaloniki	Consulate General		
Holy See	Rome	Embassy		(Note: The U.S. embassy to the Holy See is located outside Vatican territory in Rome.)
Hungary	Budapest	Embassy		
Iceland	Reykjavík	Embassy		
Ireland	Dublin	Embassy		
Italy	Rome	Embassy	Countries: San Marino	
Italy	Florence	Consulate General	Countries: San Marino	
Italy	Milan	Consulate General	Countries: San Marino	
Italy	Naples	Consulate General	Countries: San Marino	
Italy	Genoa	Consular Agency	Countries: San Marino	
Italy	Palermo	Consular Agency	Countries: San Marino	
Italy	Venice	Consular Agency	Countries: San Marino	
Kosovo	Pristina	Embassy		
Latvia	Riga	Embassy		
Lithuania	Vilnius	Embassy		
Luxembourg	Luxembourg	Embassy		
Malta	Attard	Embassy		
Moldova	Chișinău	Embassy		
Montenegro	Podgorica	Embassy		
Netherlands	The Hague	Embassy		
Netherlands	Amsterdam	Consulate General		
Netherlands	Willemstad, Curaçao	Consulate General		
North Macedonia	Skopje	Embassy		
Norway	Oslo	Embassy		
Norway	Tromsø	American Presence Post		
Poland	Warsaw	Embassy		
Poland	Kraków	Consulate General		
Poland	Poznań	Consular Agency		
Portugal	Lisbon	Embassy		
Portugal	Ponta Delgada	Consulate		
Romania	Bucharest	Embassy		
Russia	Moscow	Embassy		
Serbia	Belgrade	Embassy		
Slovakia	Bratislava	Embassy		
Slovenia	Ljubljana	Embassy		
Spain	Madrid	Embassy	Countries: Andorra	
Spain	Barcelona	Consulate General	Countries: Andorra	
Spain	Fuengirola	Consular Agency	Countries: Andorra	
Spain	Las Palmas	Consular Agency	Countries: Andorra	
Spain	Palma de Mallorca	Consular Agency	Countries: Andorra	
Spain	Seville	Consular Agency	Countries: Andorra	
Spain	Valencia	Consular Agency	Countries: Andorra	
Sweden	Stockholm	Embassy		
Switzerland	Bern	Embassy	Countries: Liechtenstein	
Switzerland	Geneva	Consular Agency	Countries: Liechtenstein	
Switzerland	Zürich	Consular Agency	Countries: Liechtenstein	
Ukraine	Kyiv	Embassy		
United Kingdom	London	Embassy		
United Kingdom	Belfast	Consulate General		
United Kingdom	Edinburgh	Consulate General		
United Kingdom	Hamilton, Bermuda	Consulate General		
United Kingdom	George Town, Cayman Islands	Consular Agency		

Embassy in Athens

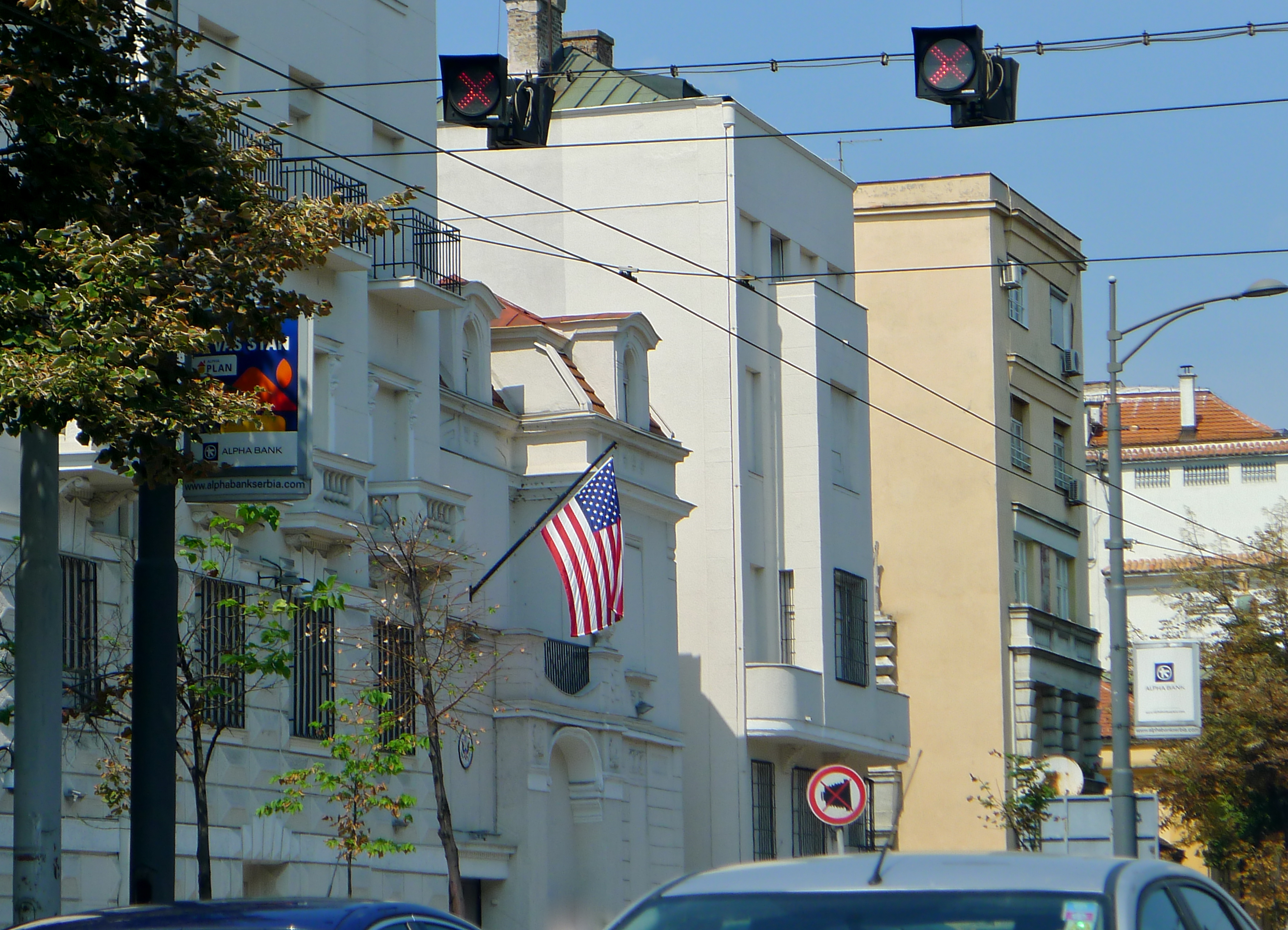
Former embassy building in Belgrade

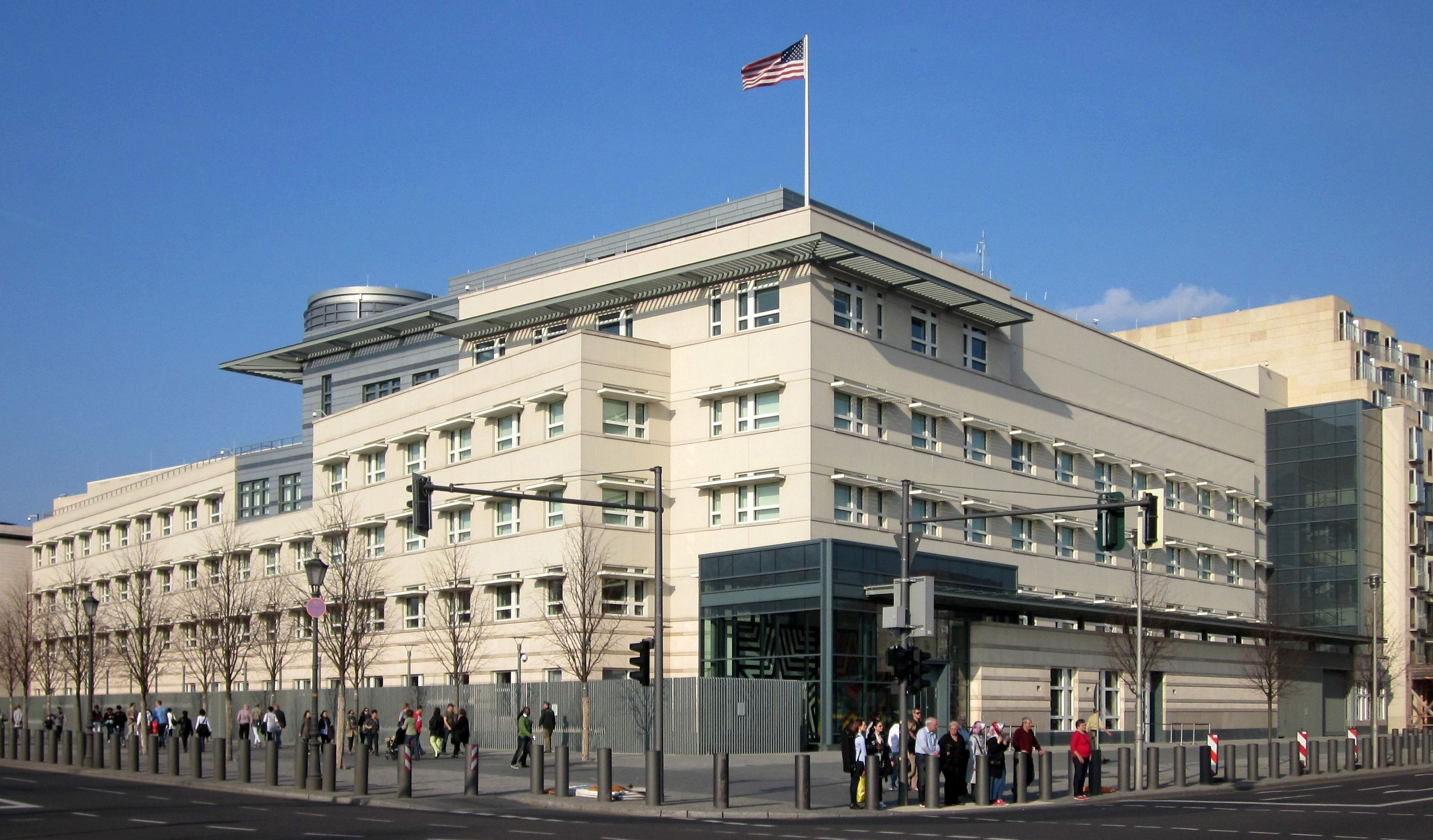
Embassy in Berlin

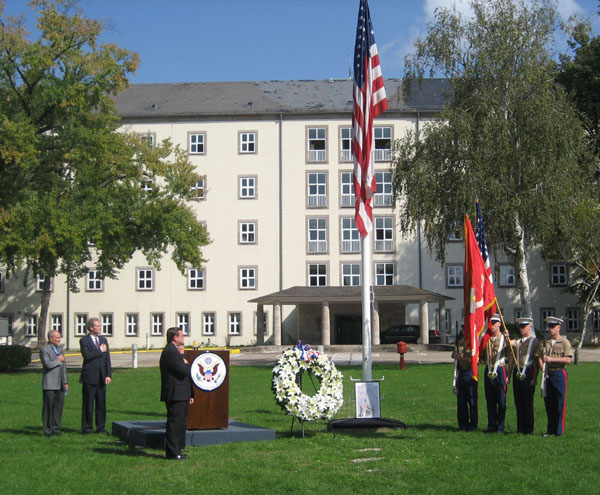
Consulate-General in Frankfurt

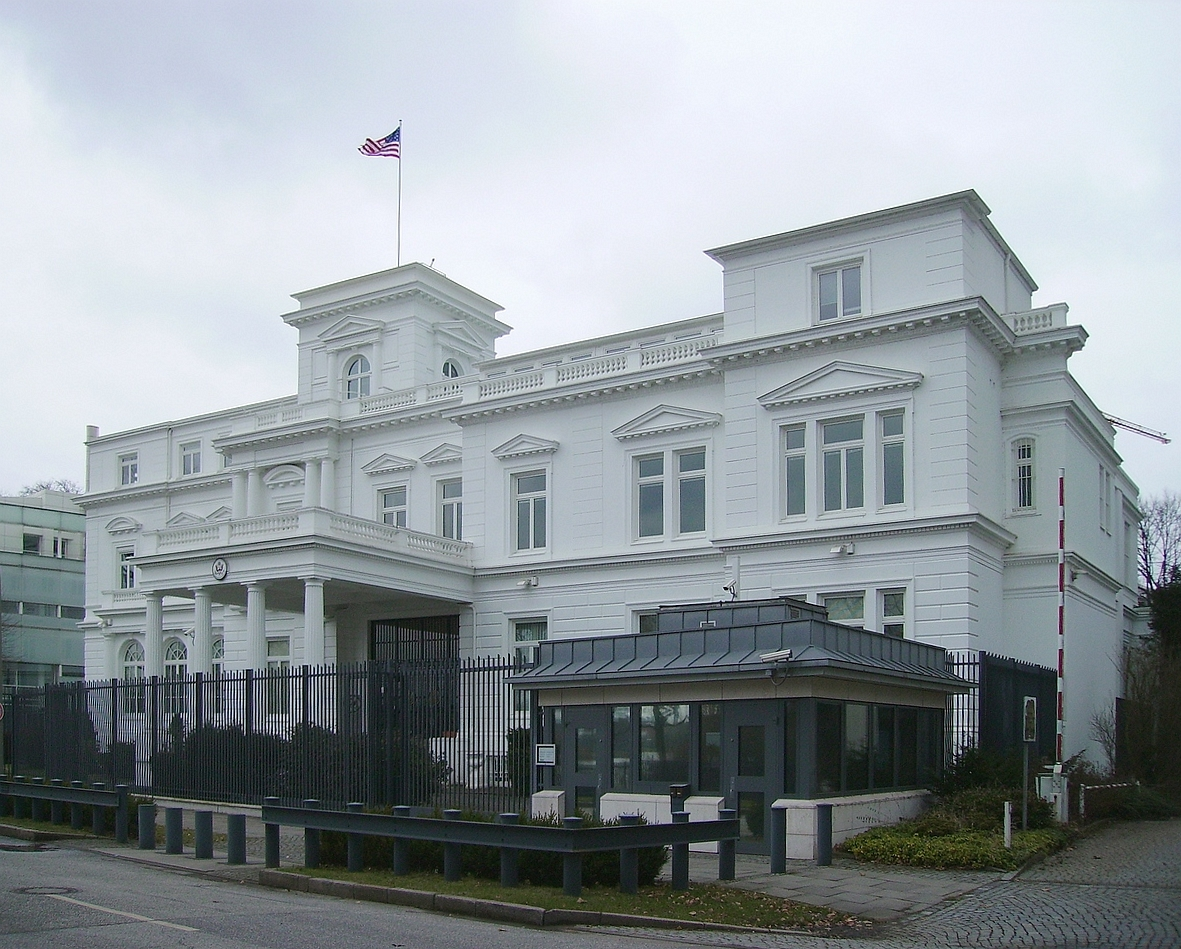
Consulate-General in Hamburg

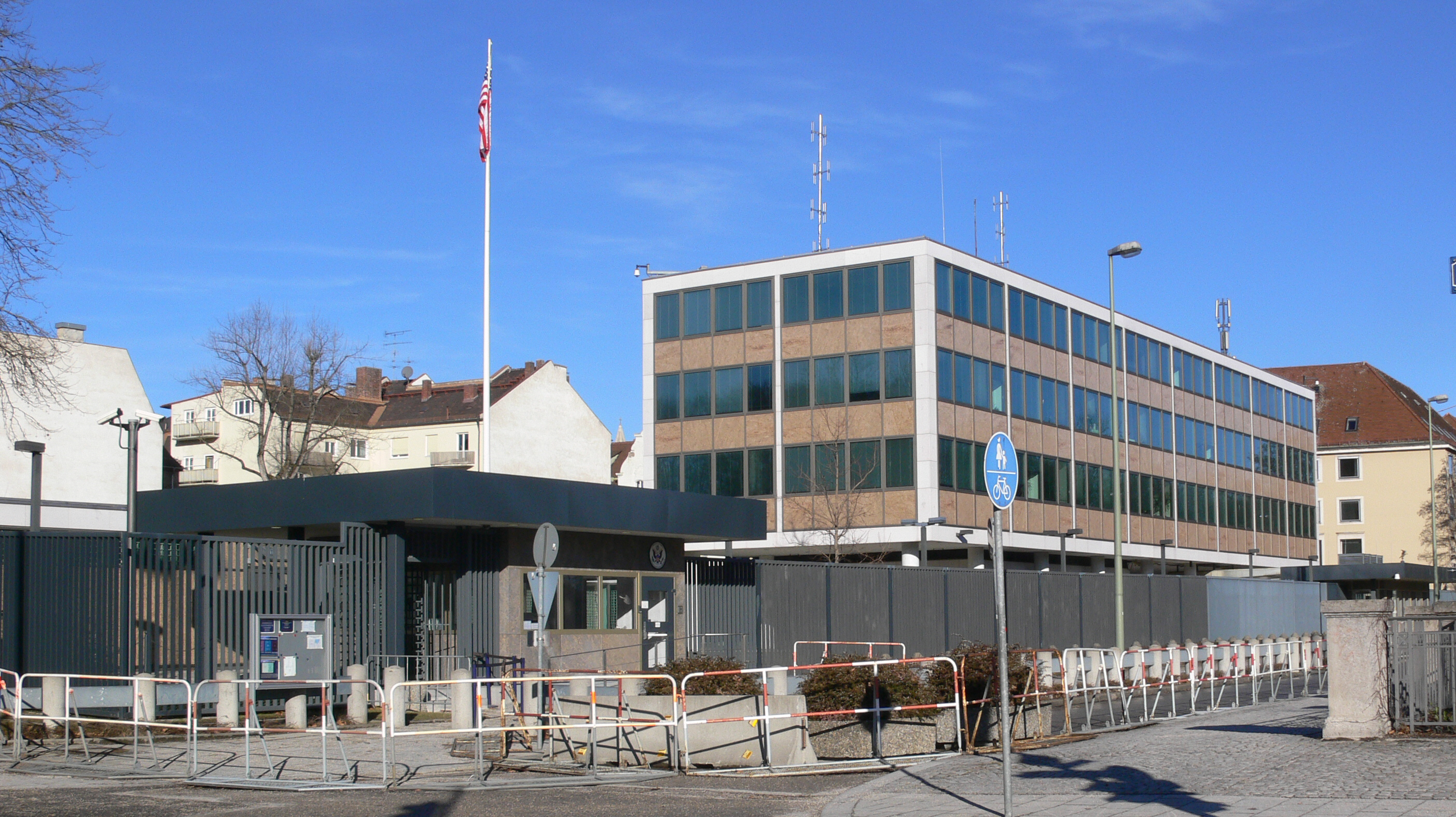
Consulate-General in Munich

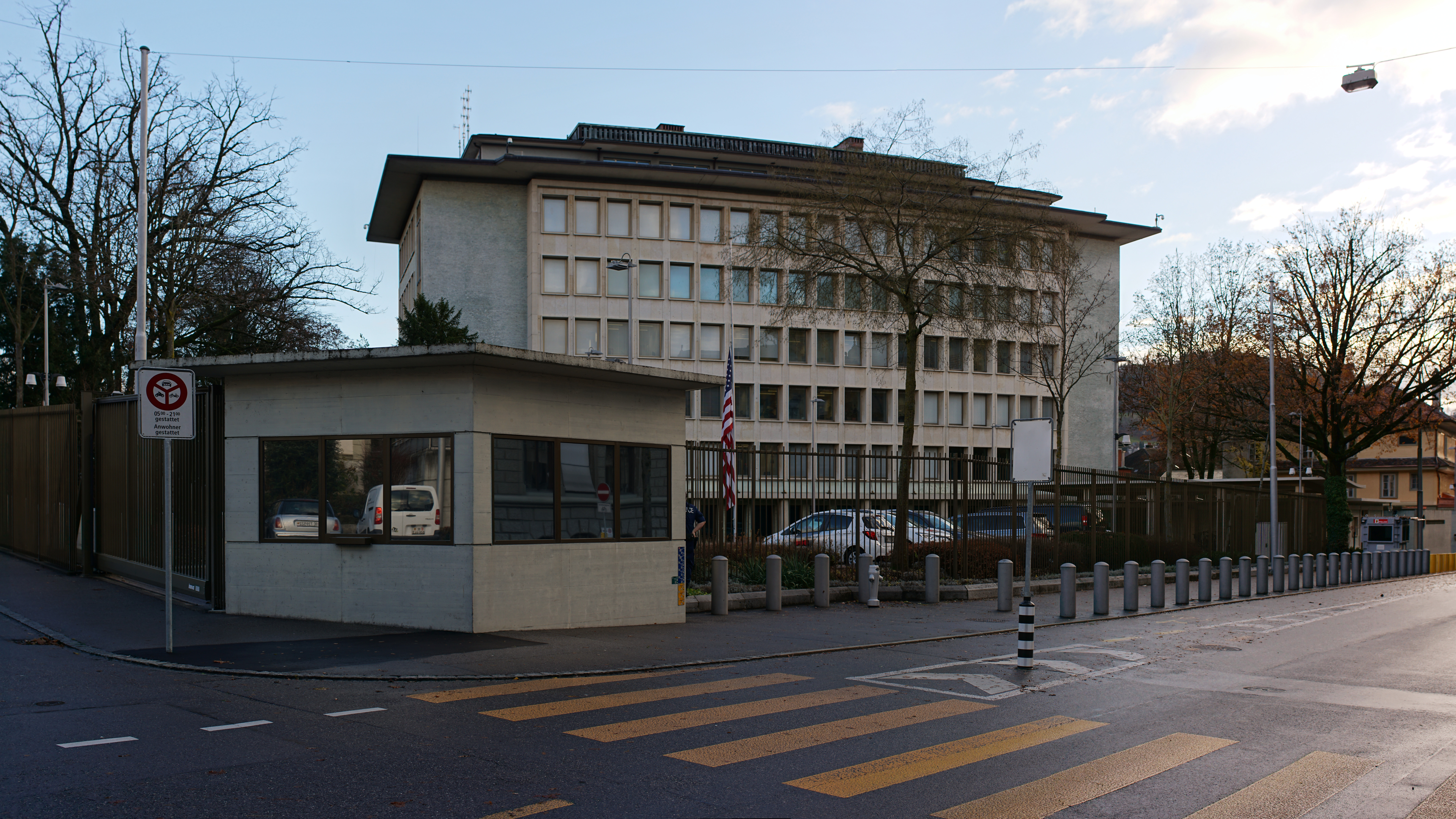
Embassy in Bern

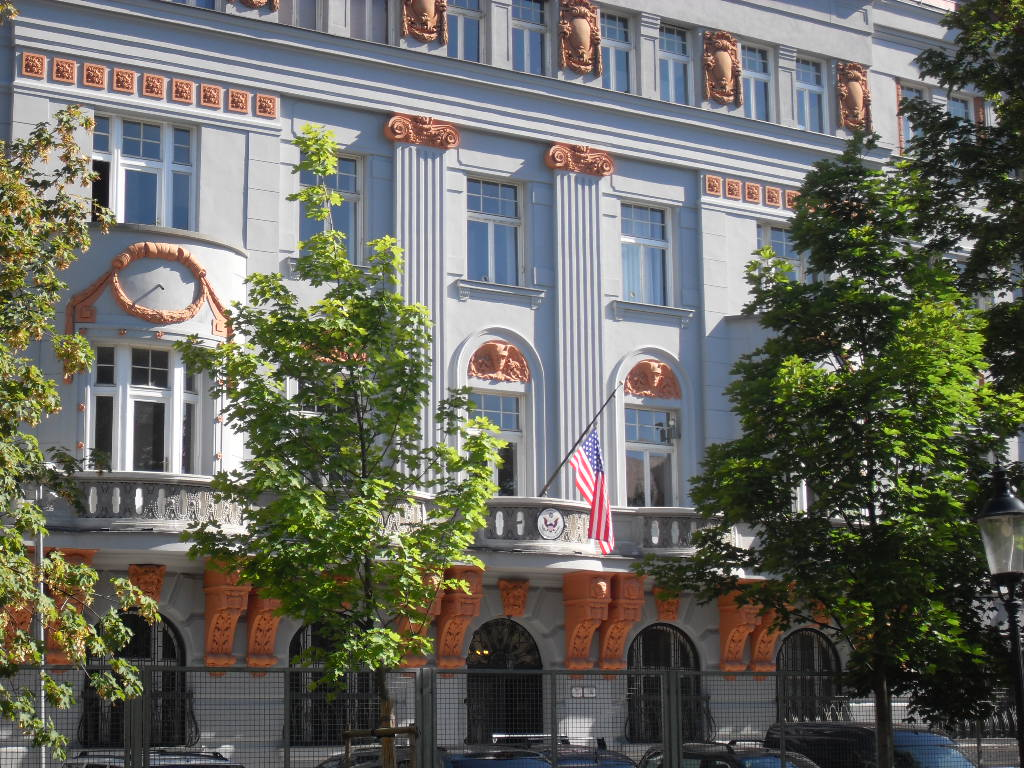
Embassy in Bratislava

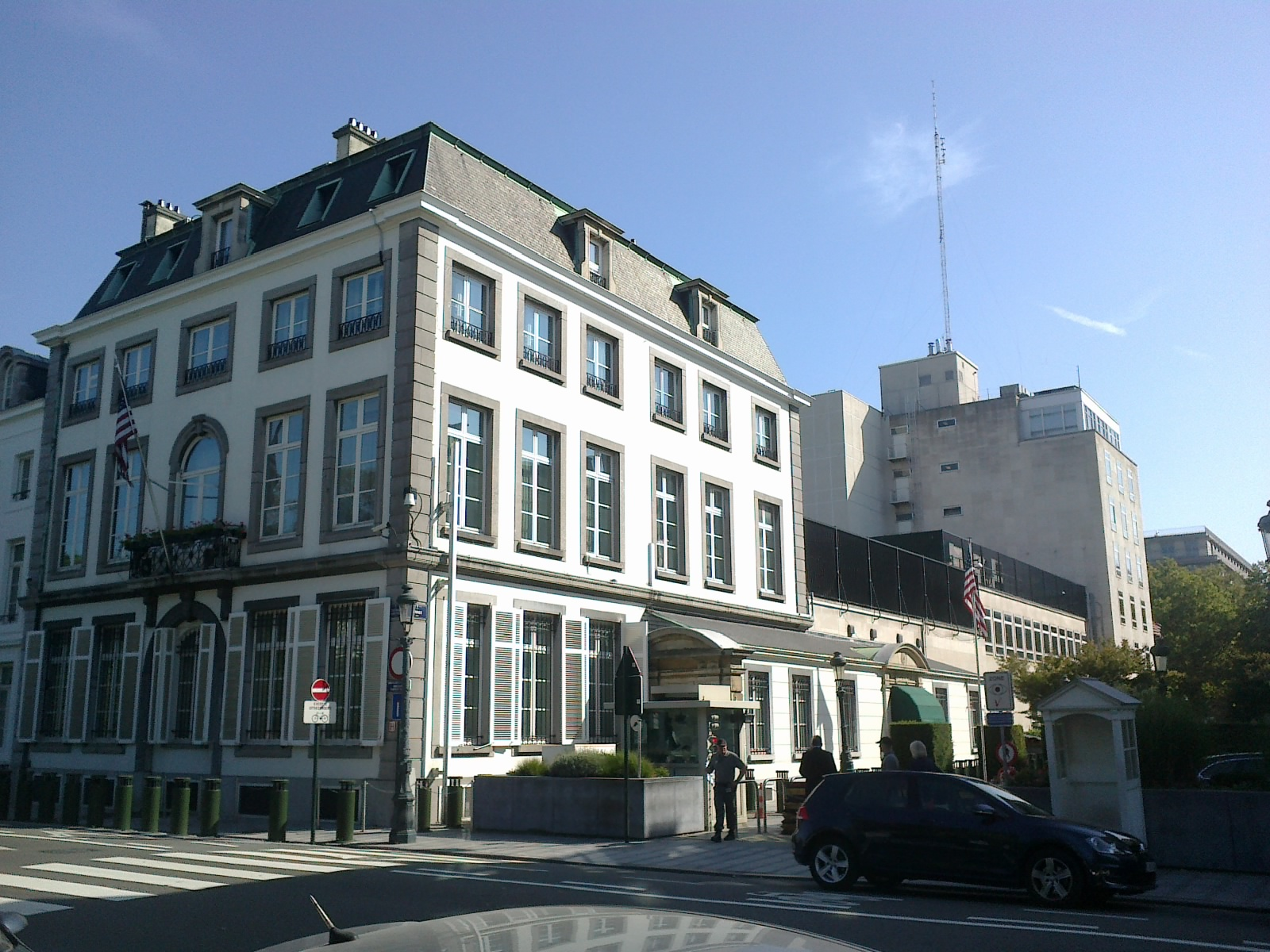
Embassy in Brussels

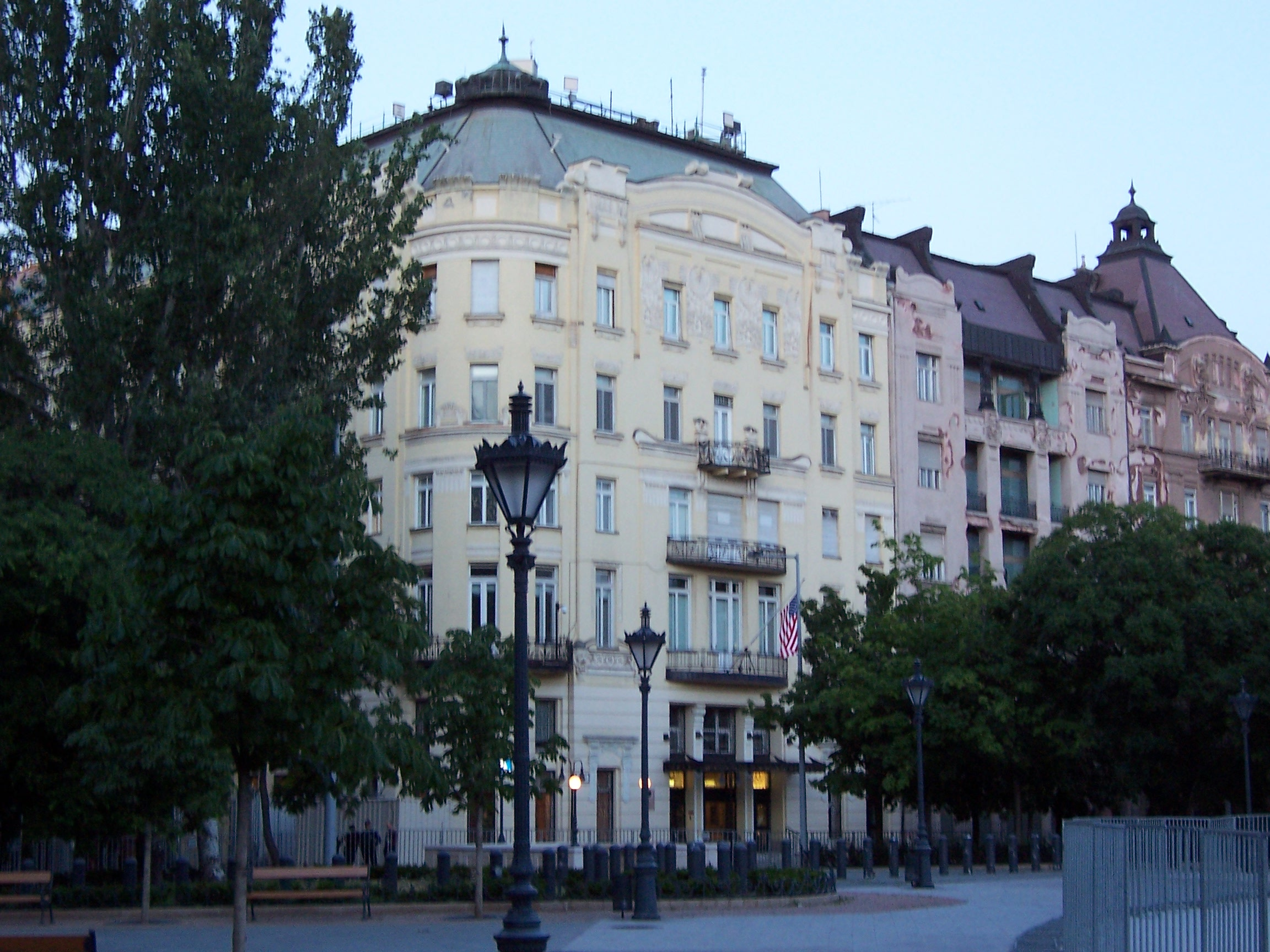
Embassy in Budapest

Embassy in Chişinău

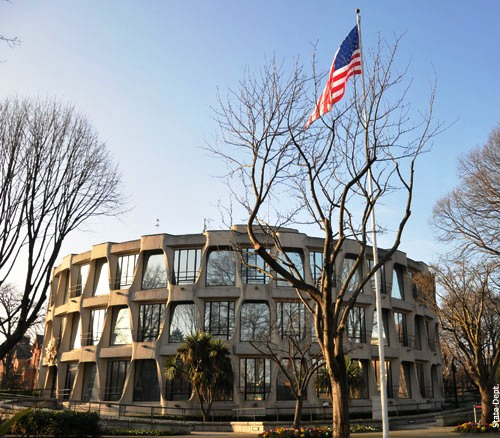
Embassy in Dublin

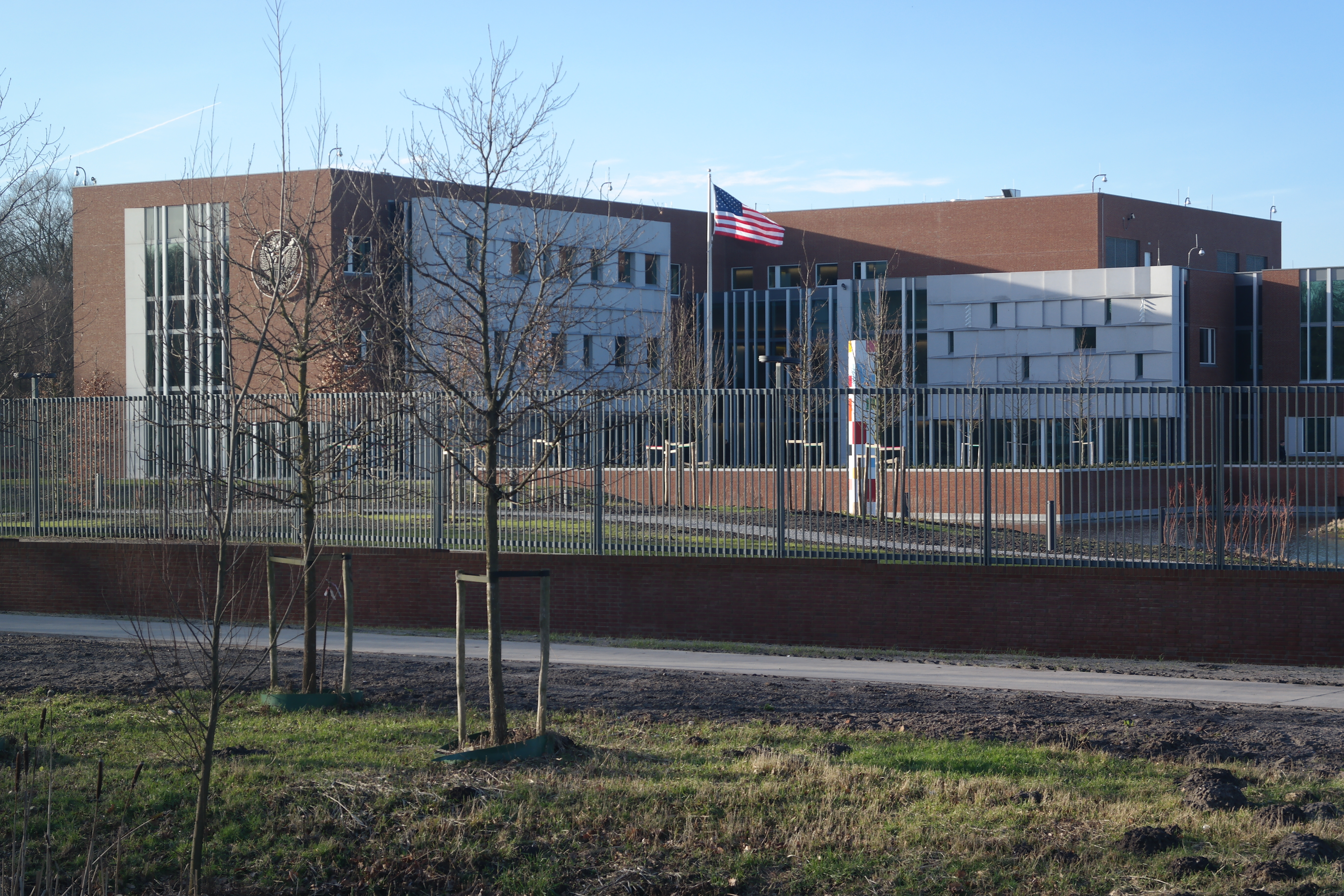
Embassy in The Hague

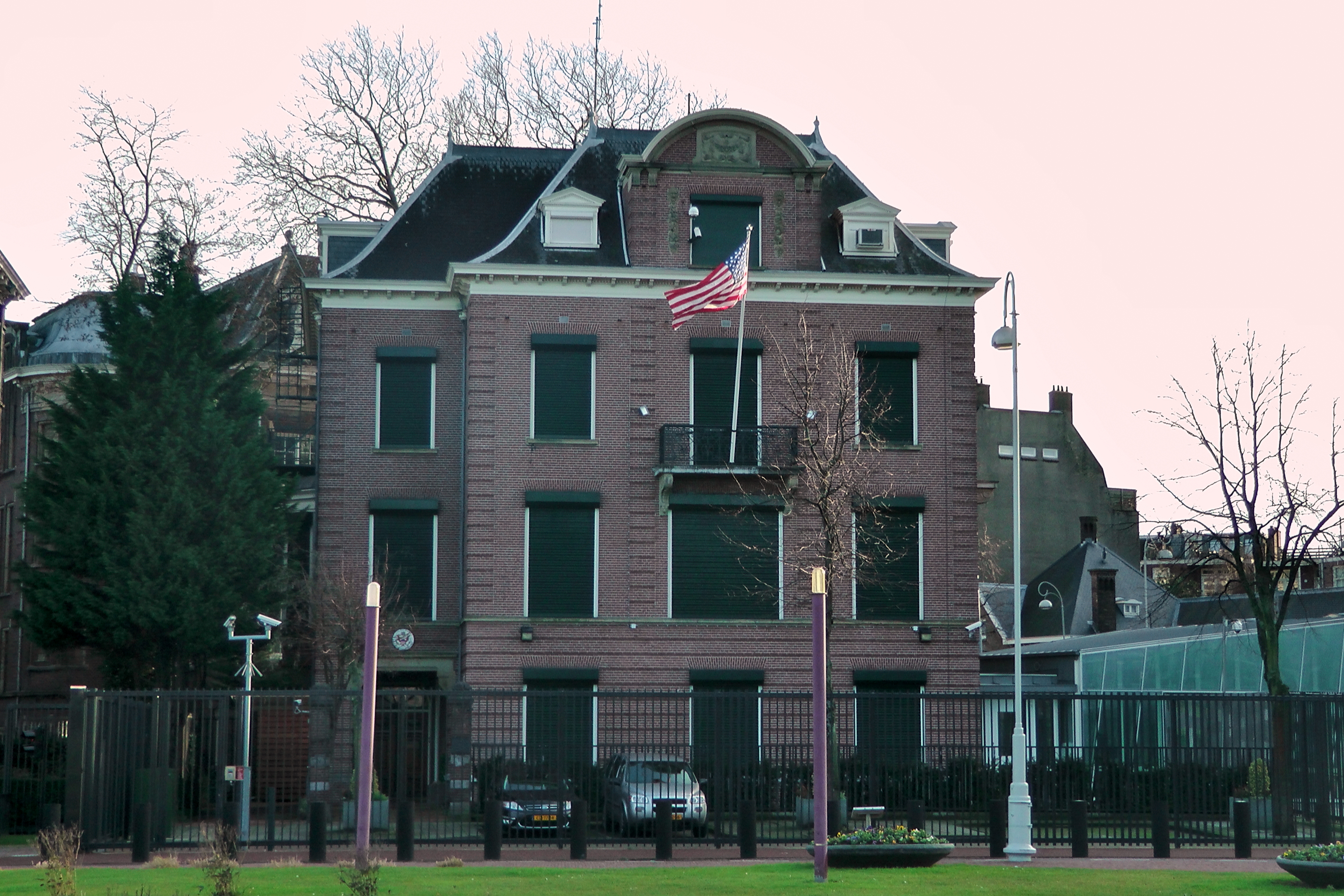
Consulate-General in Amsterdam

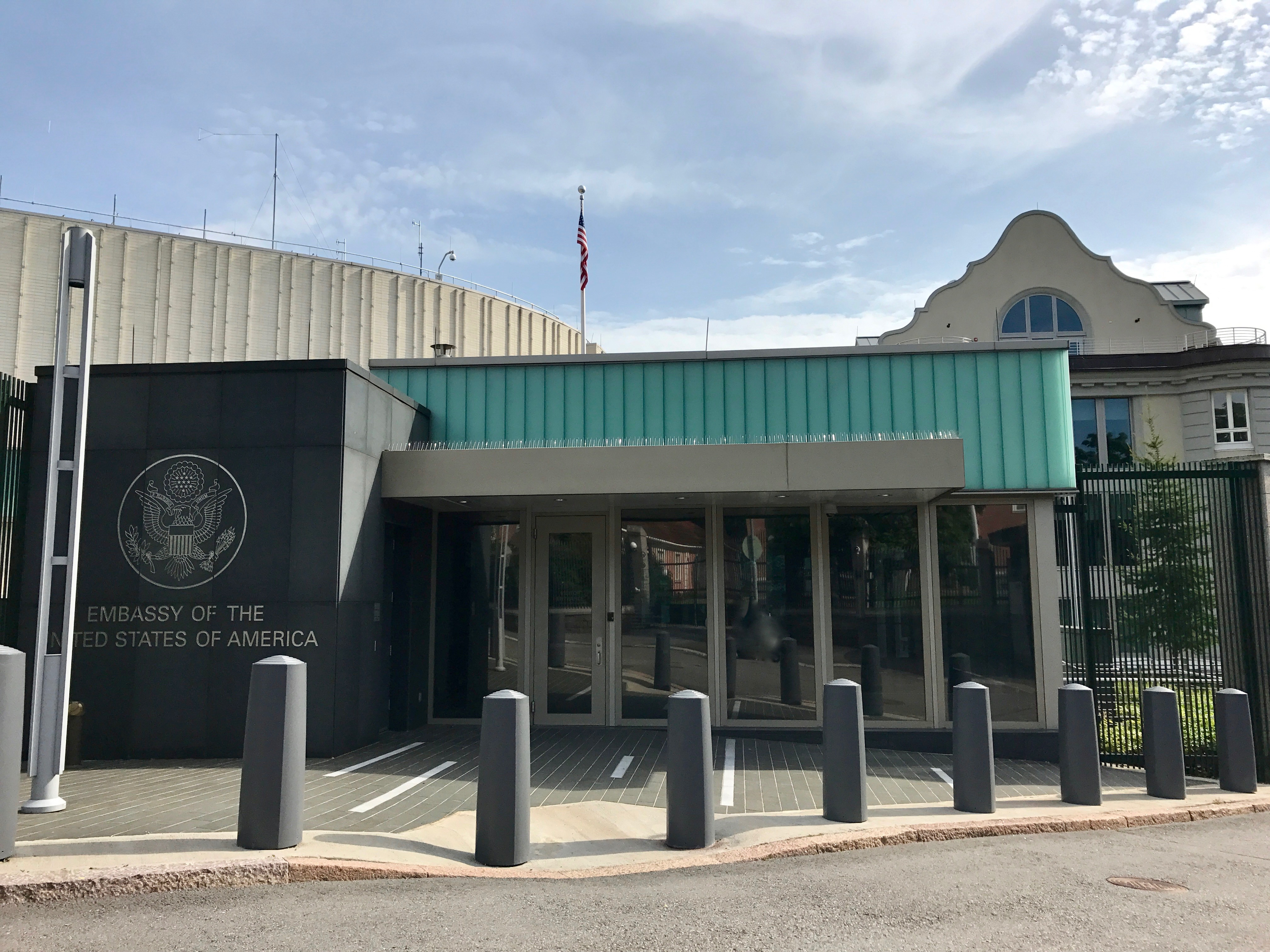
Embassy in Helsinki

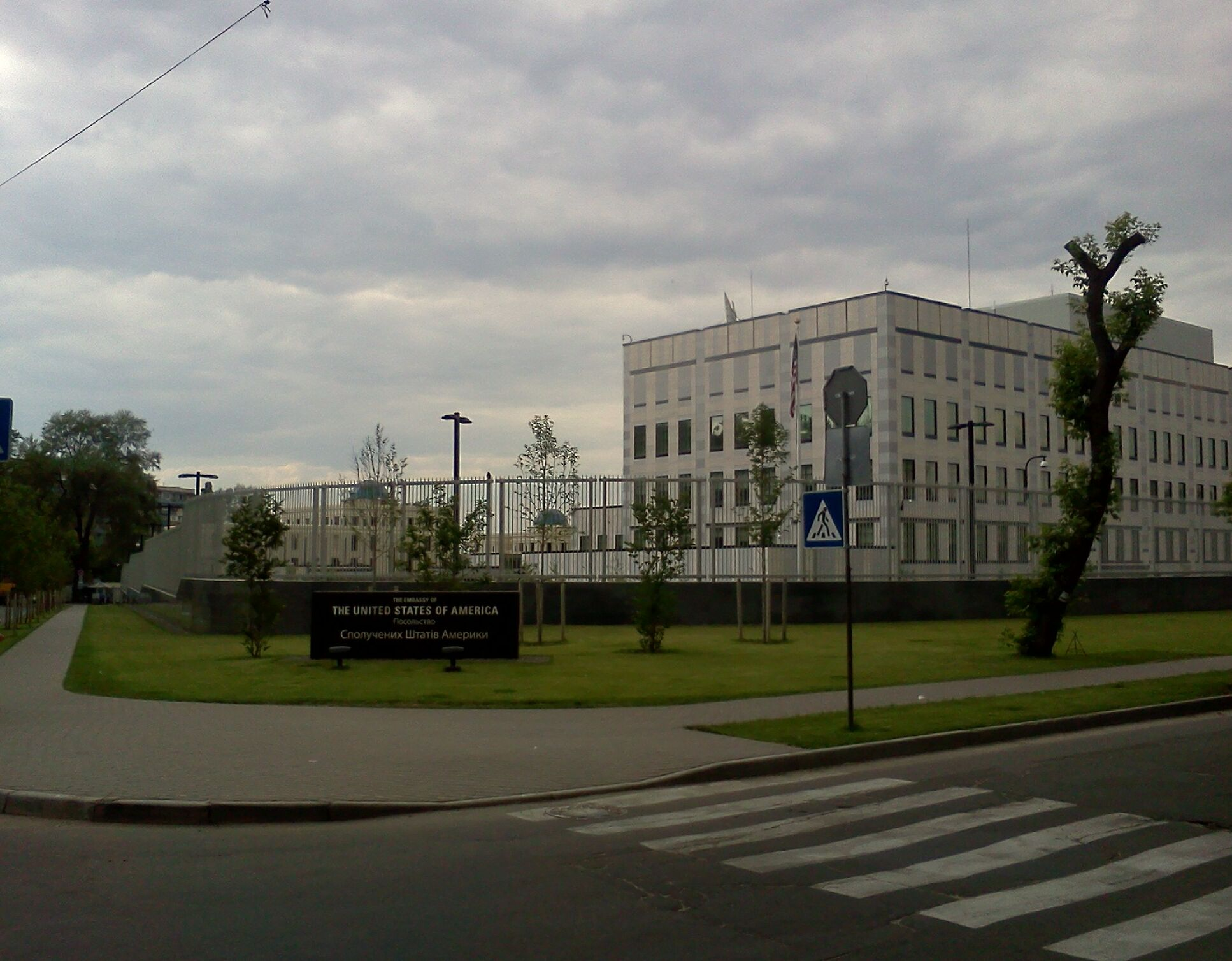
Embassy in Kyiv

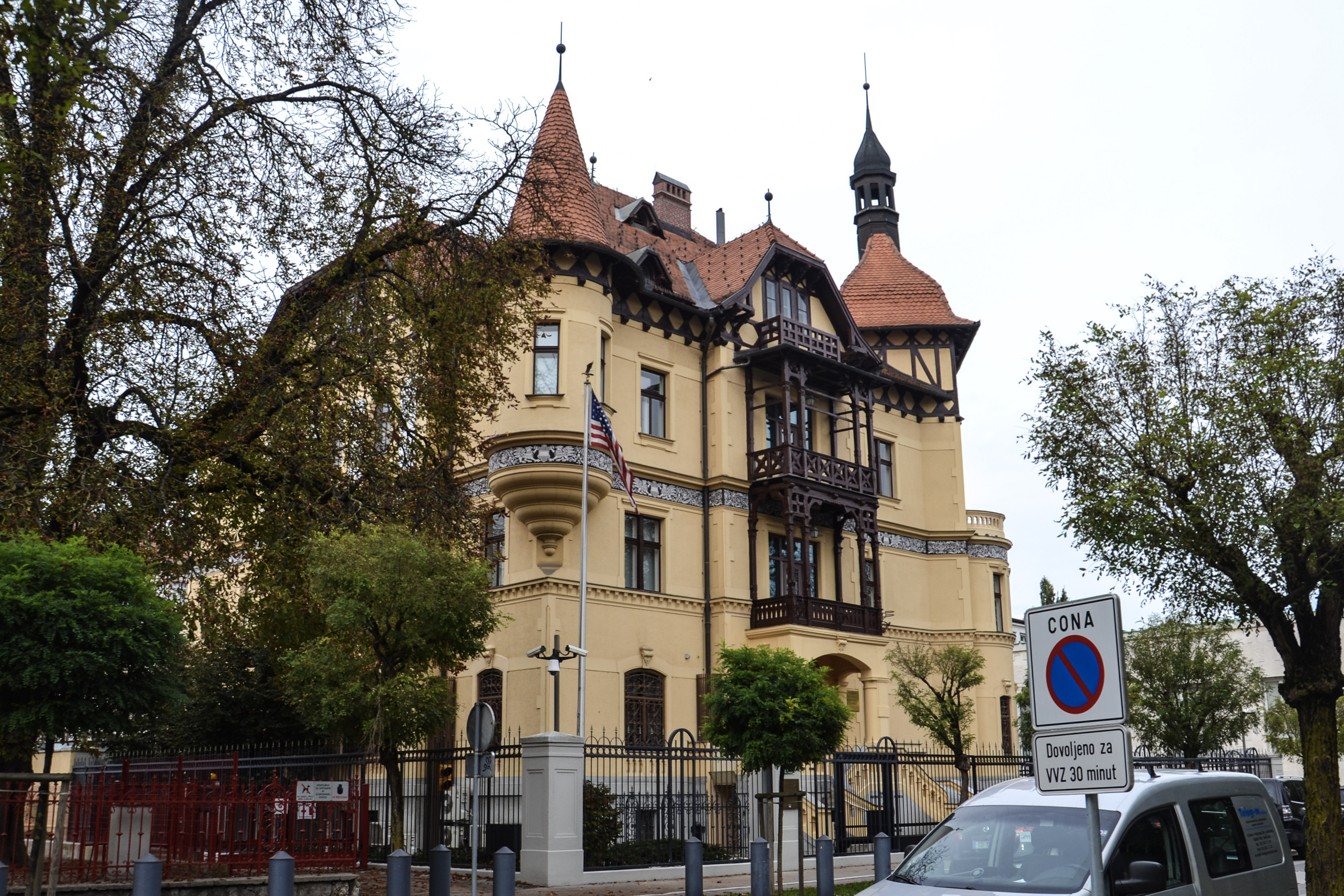
Embassy in Ljubljana

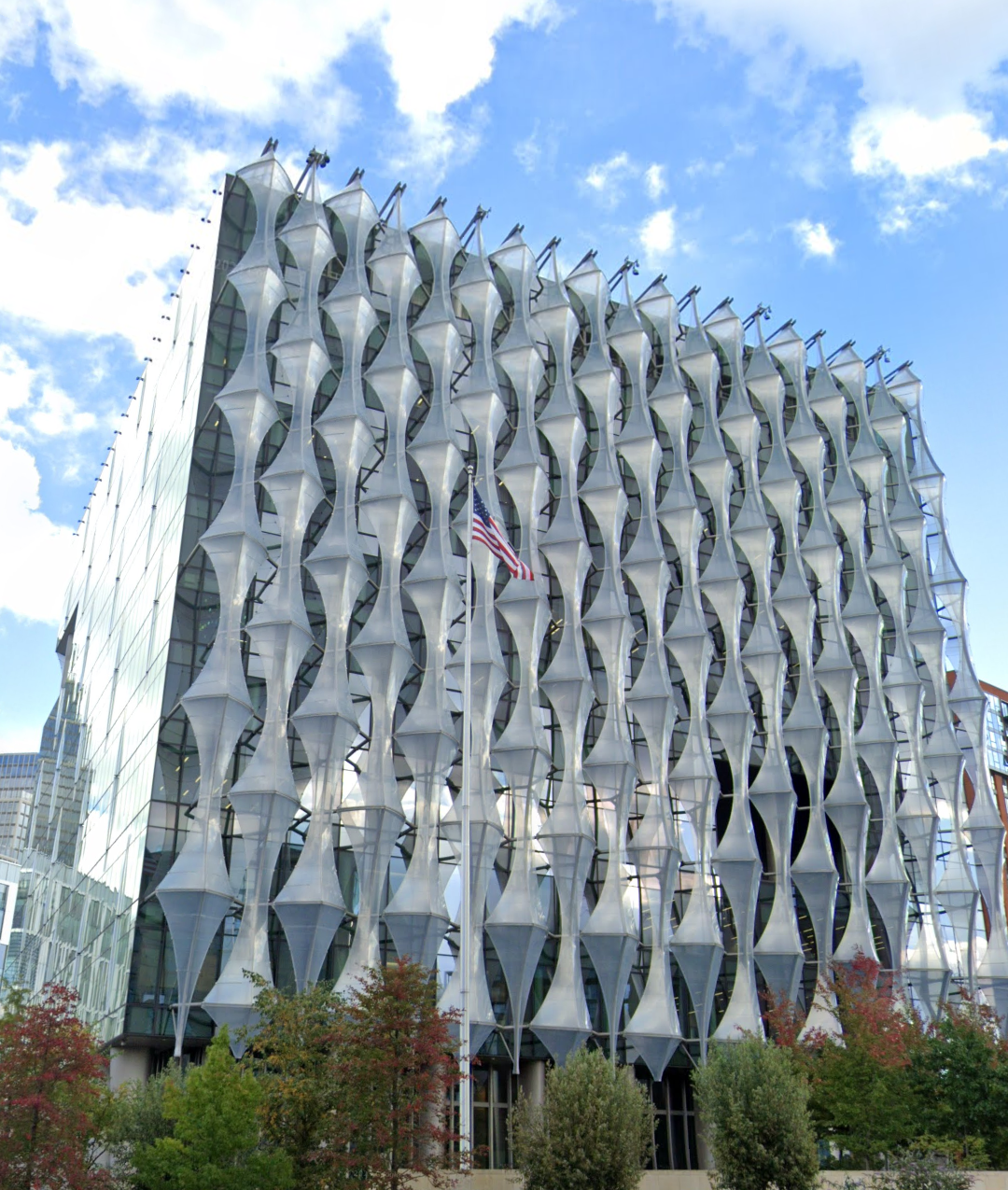
Embassy in London

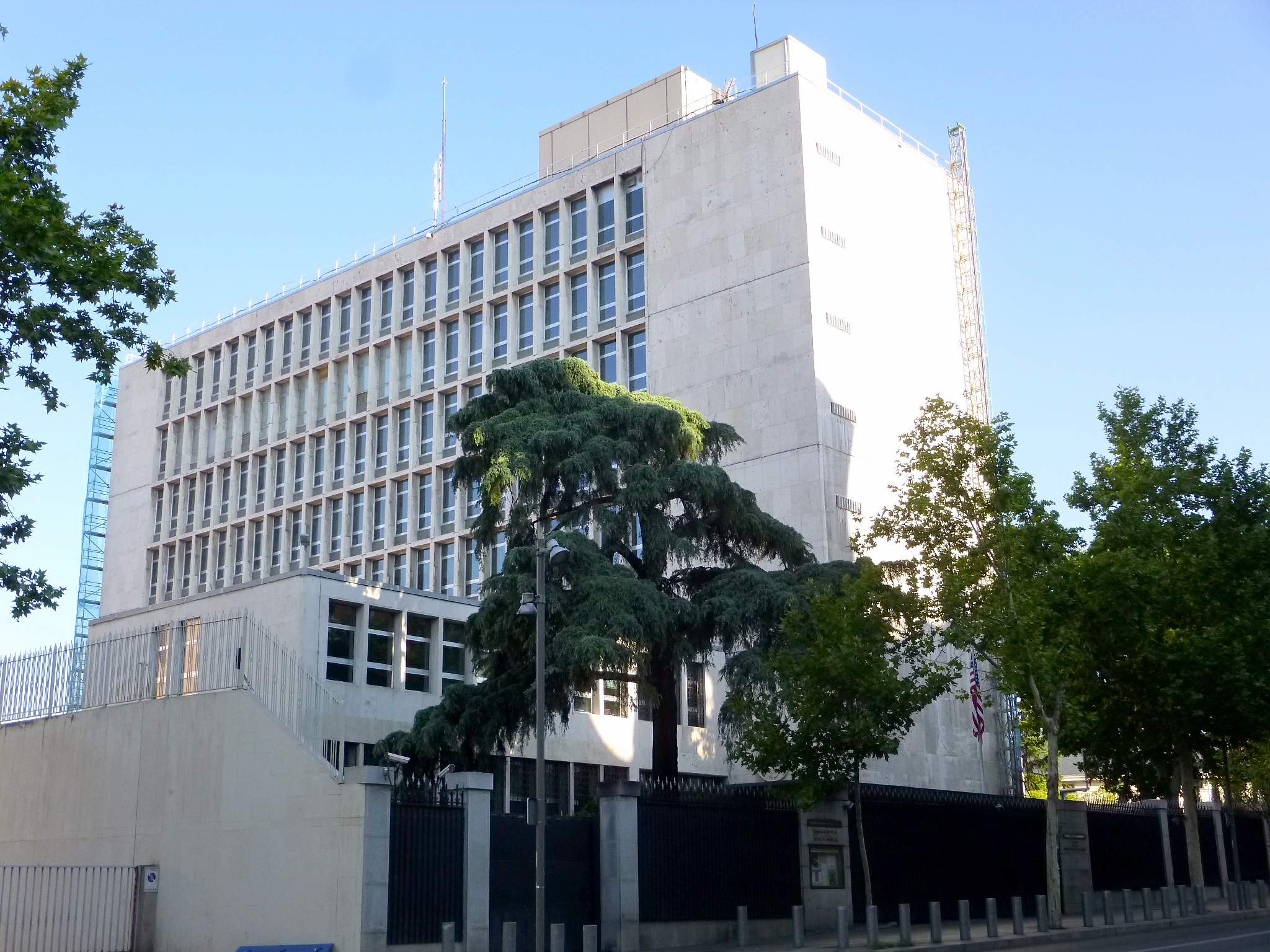
Embassy in Madrid

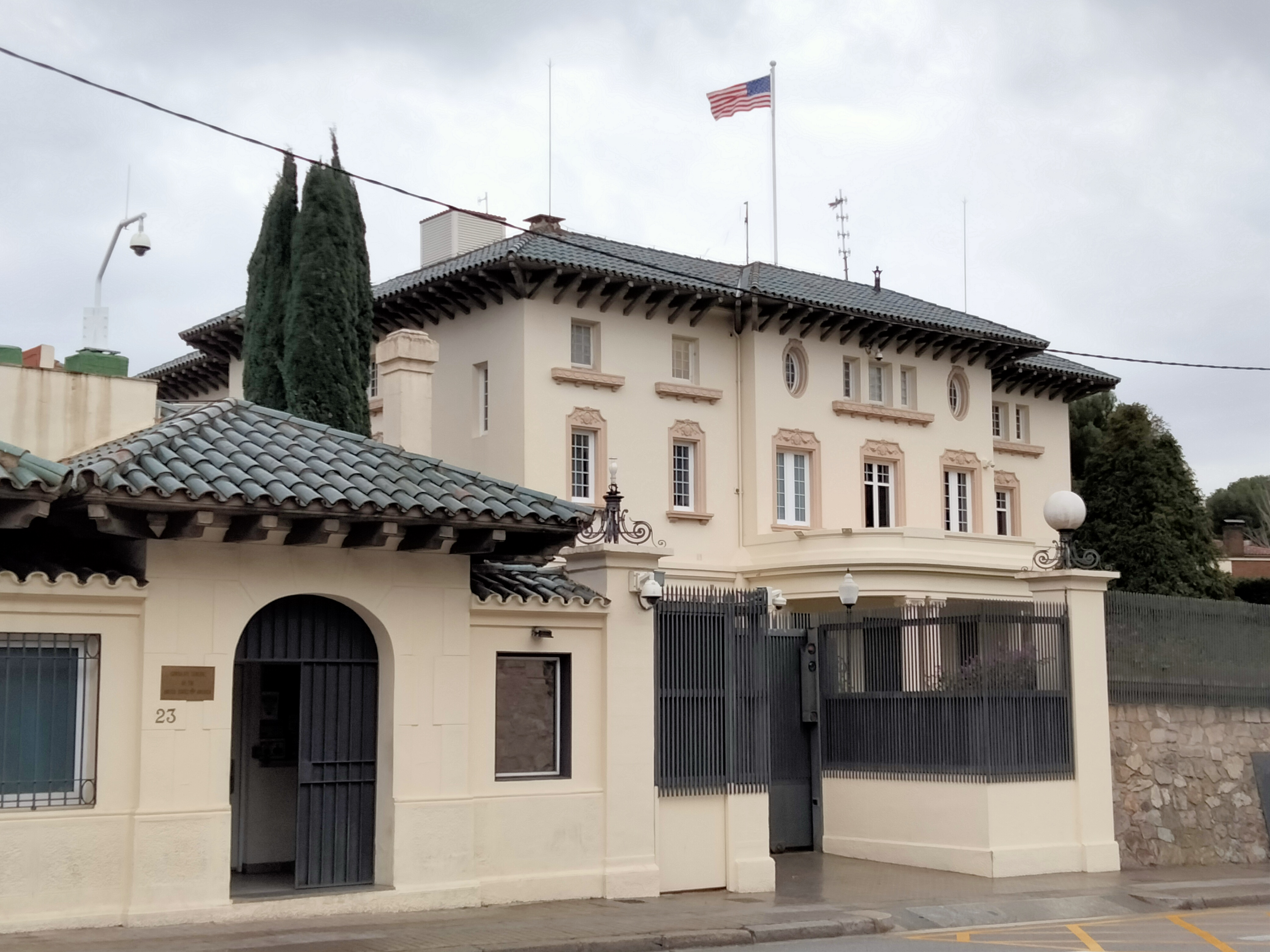
Consulate-General in Barcelona

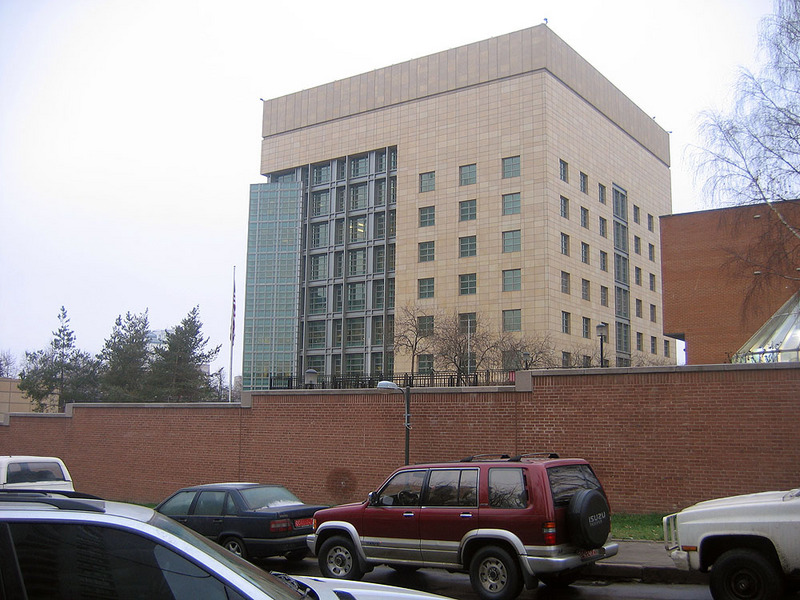
Embassy in Moscow

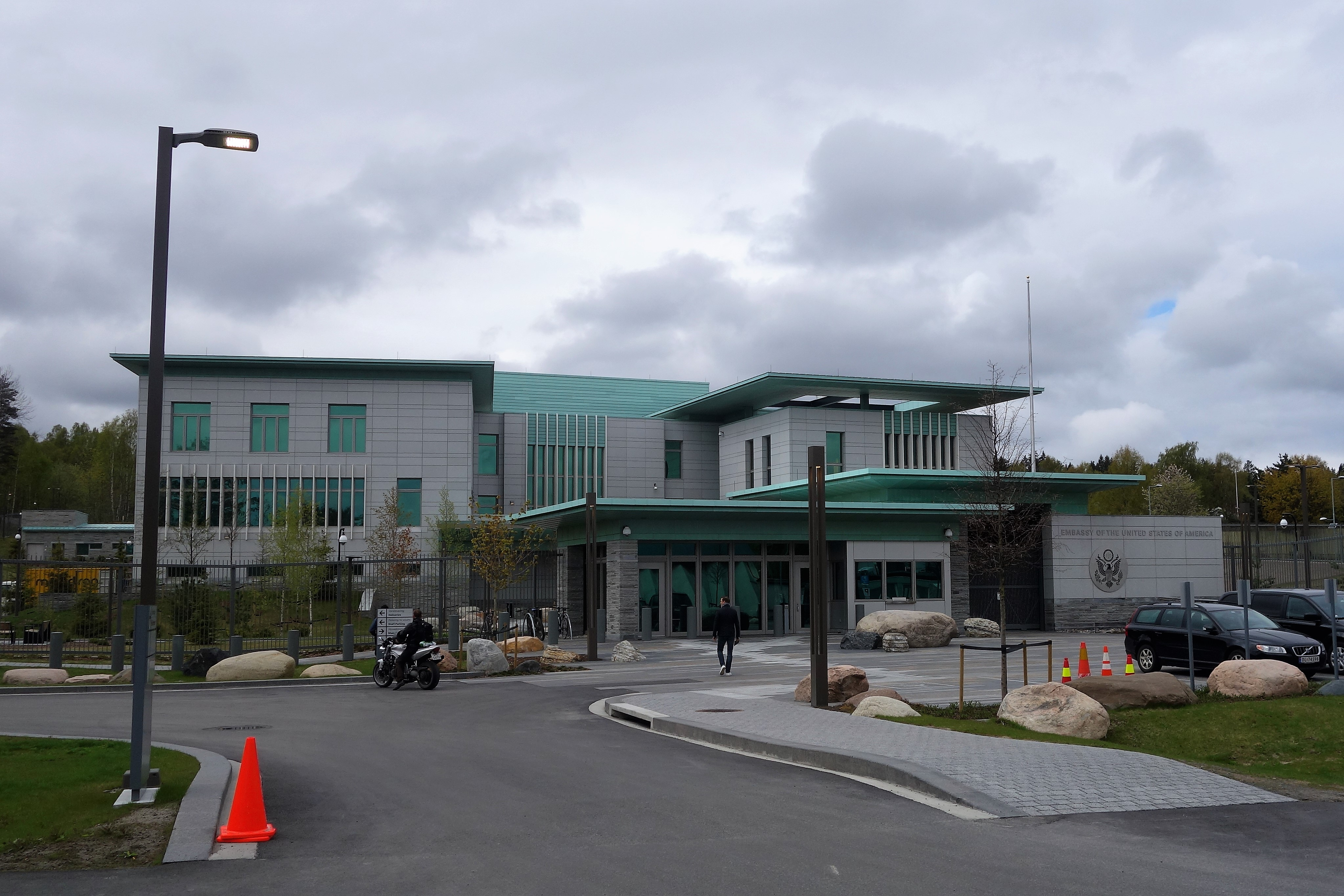
Embassy in Oslo

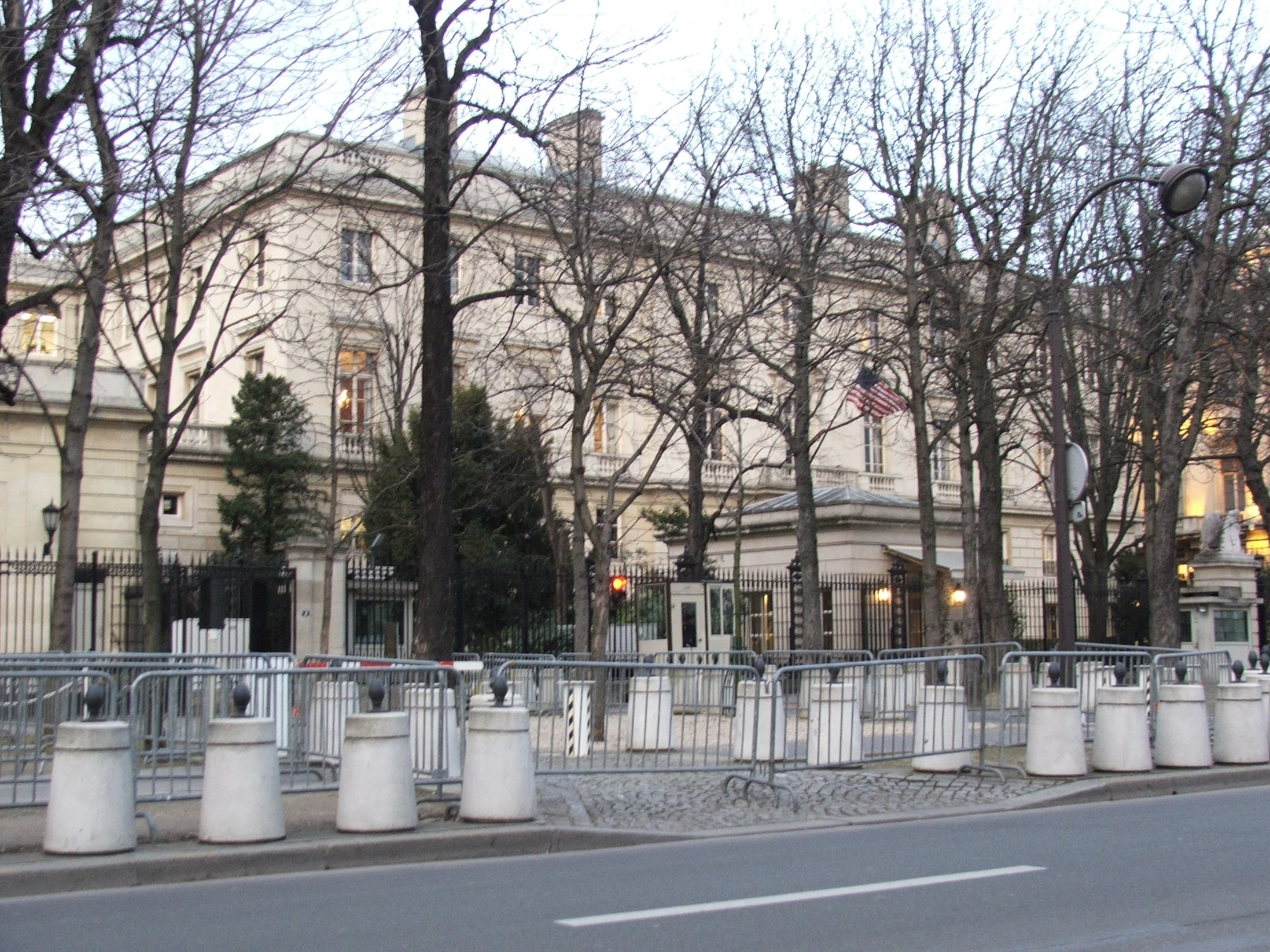
Embassy in Paris

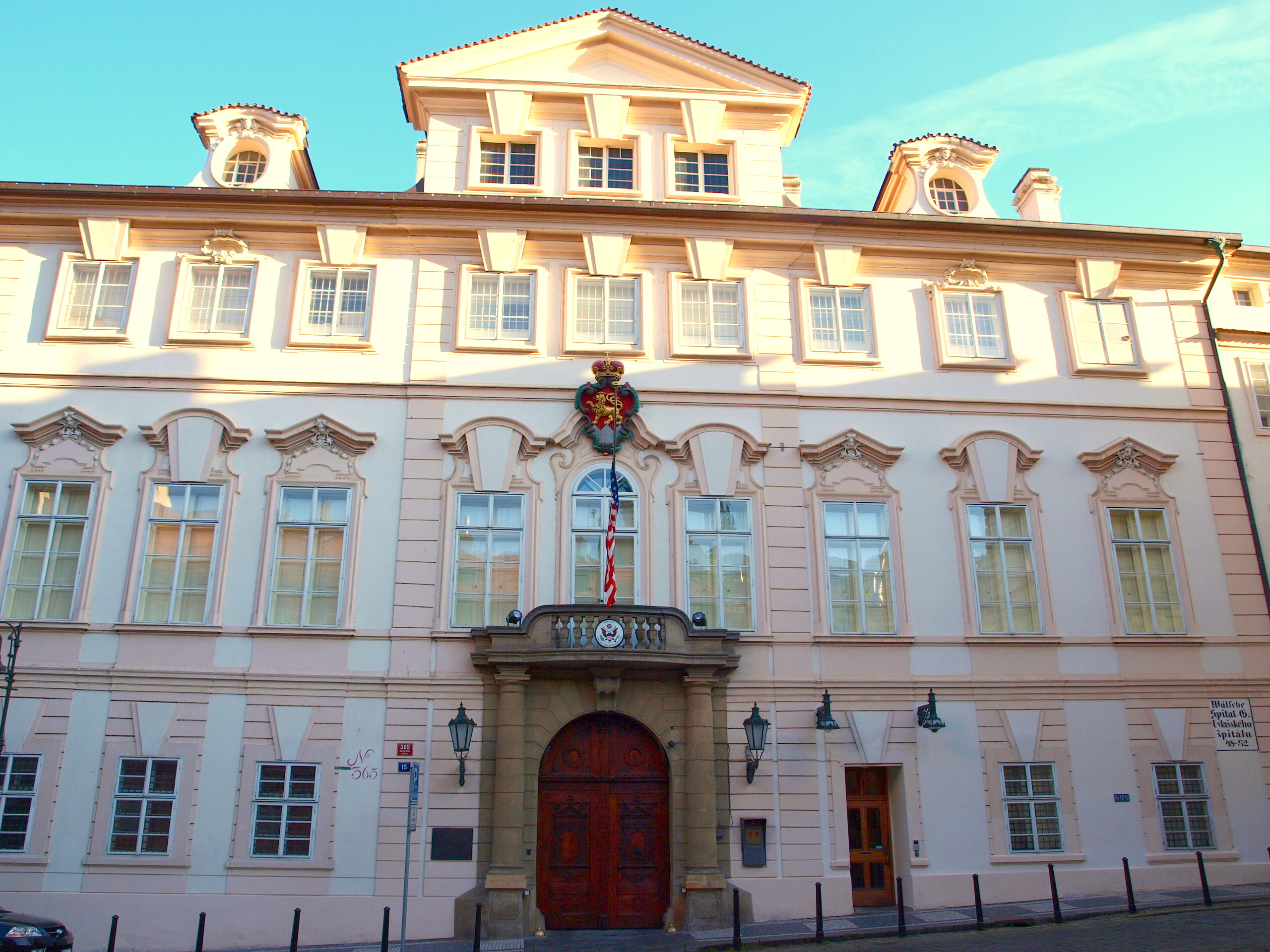
Embassy in Prague

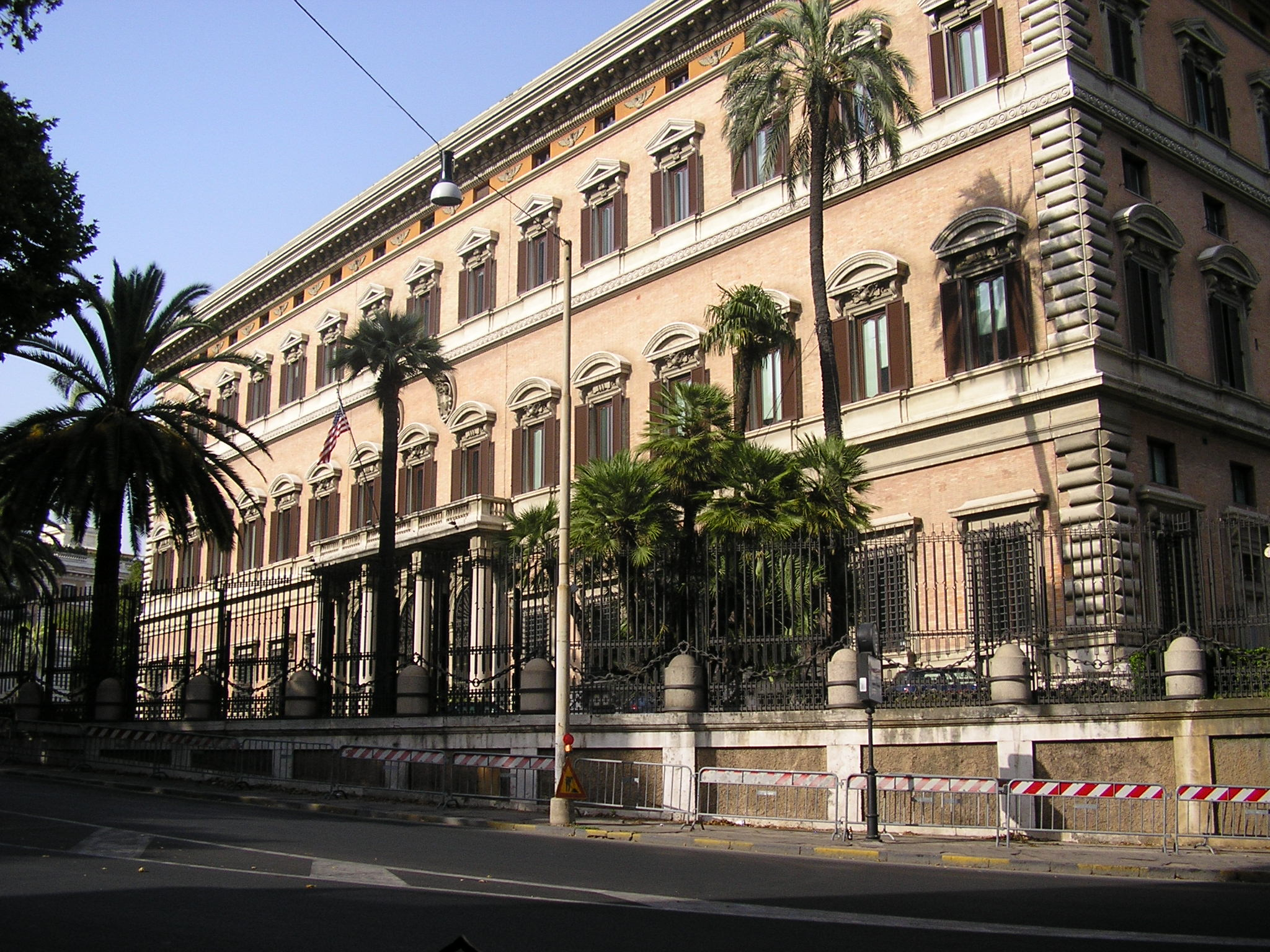
Embassy in Rome

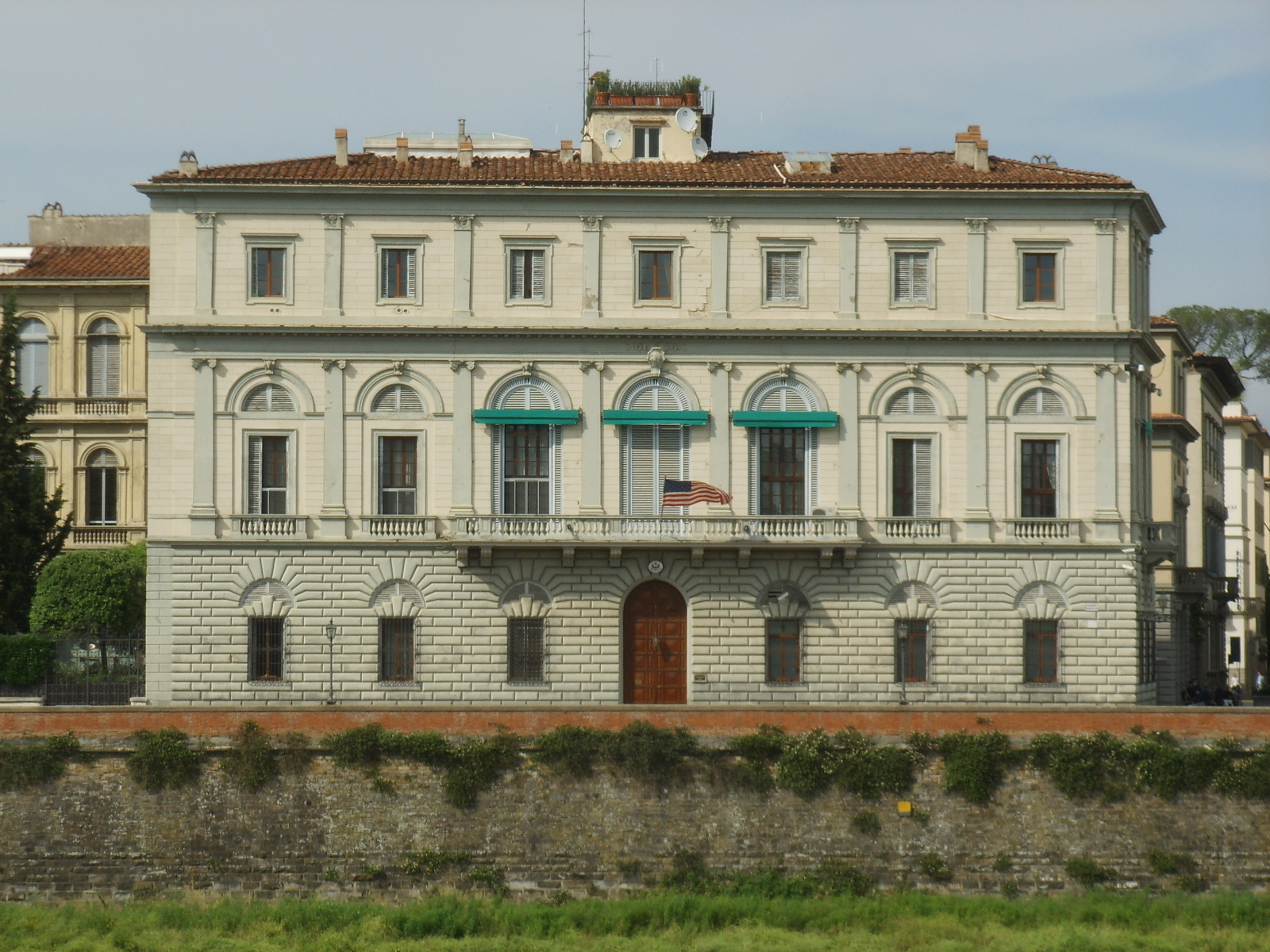
Consulate-General in Florence

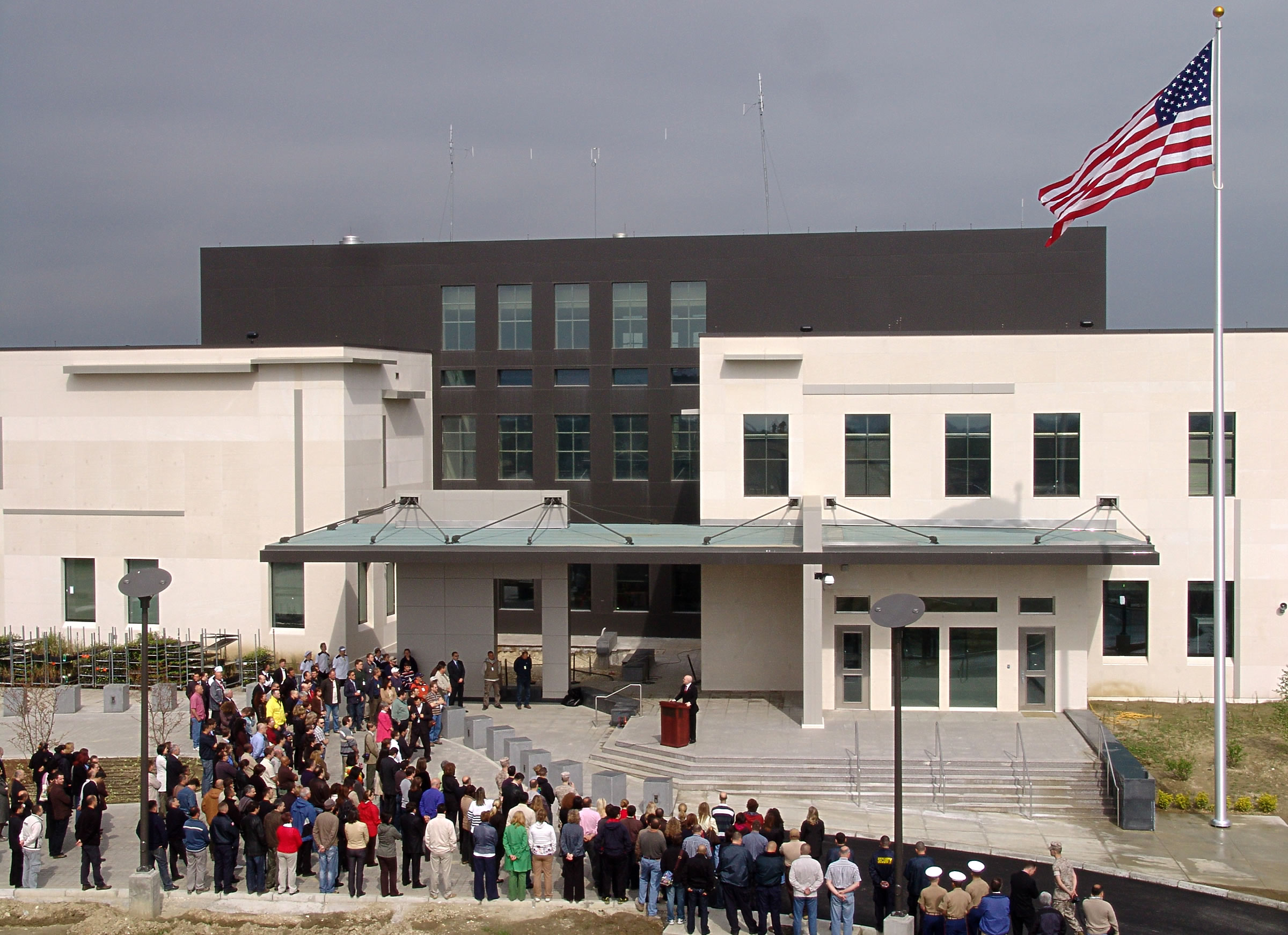
Embassy in Skopje

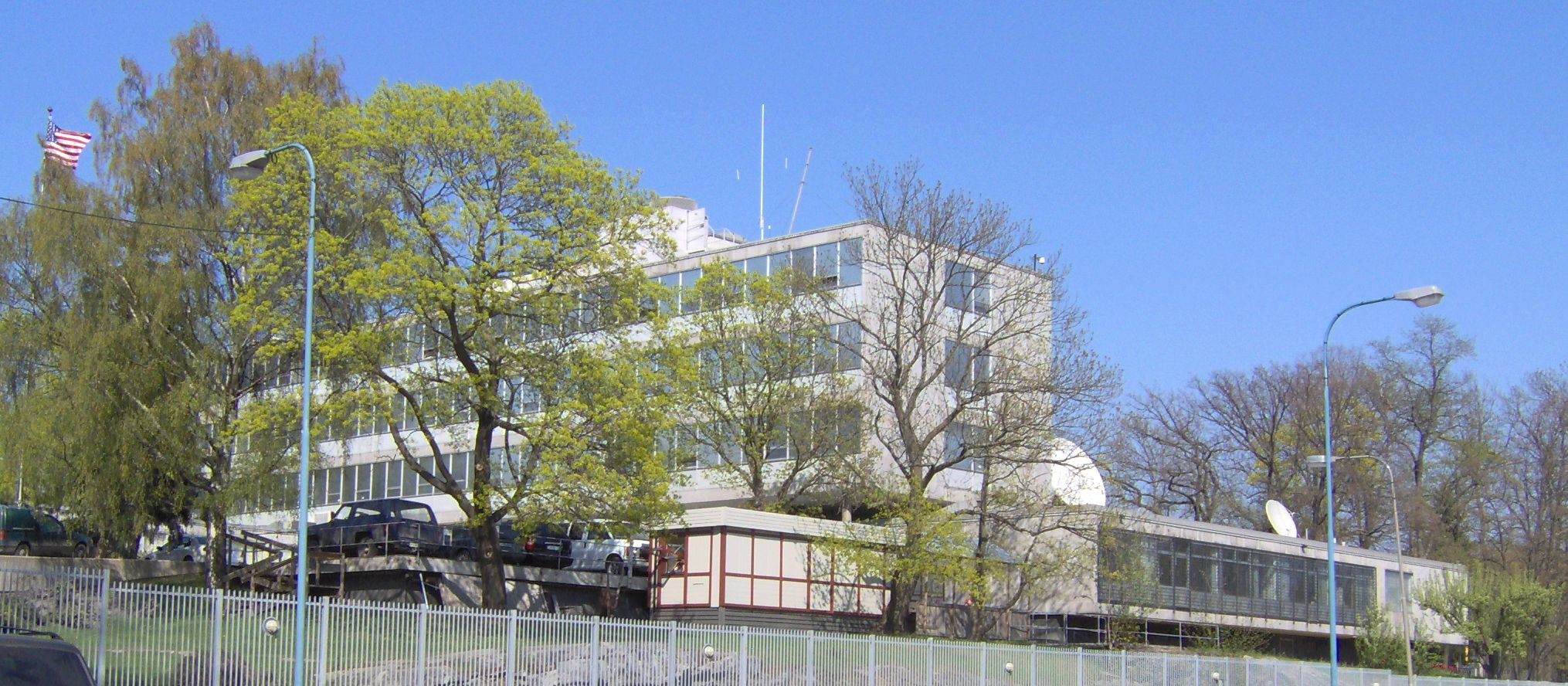
Embassy in Stockholm

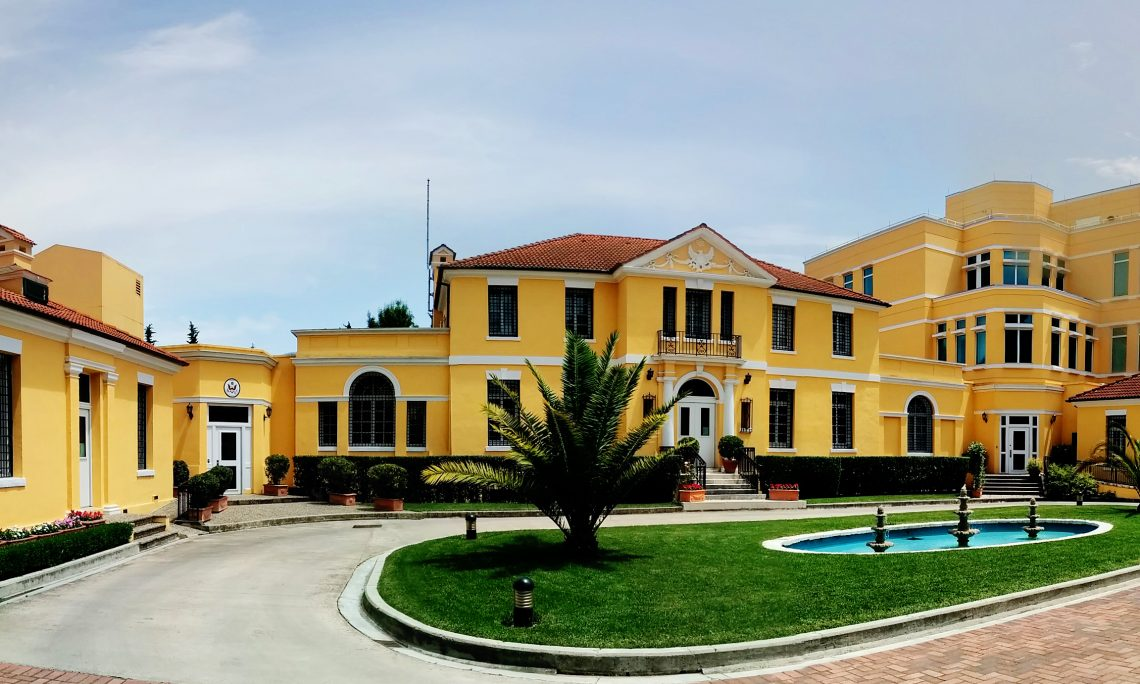
Embassy in Tirana

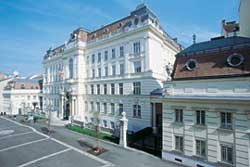
Embassy in Vienna

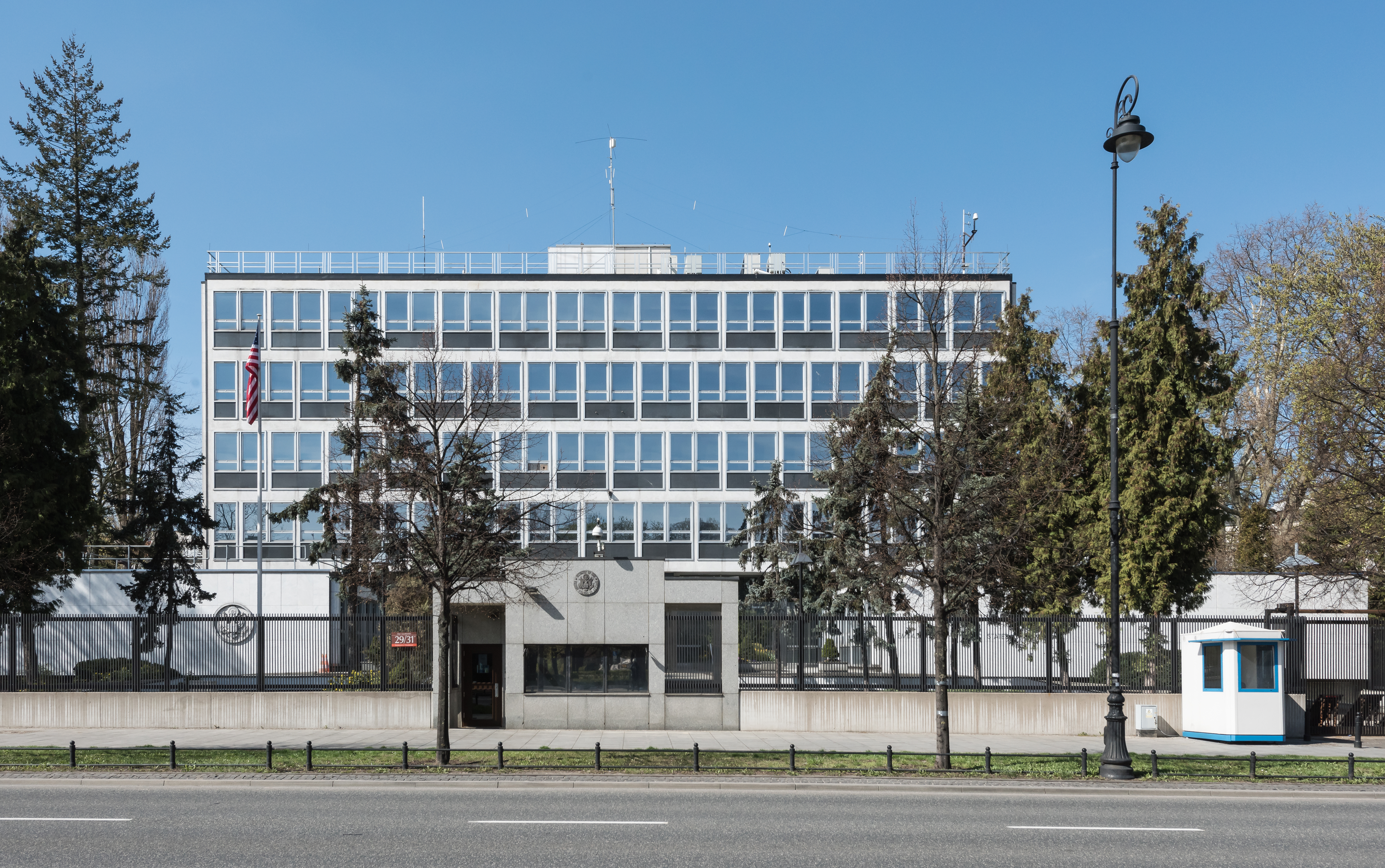
Embassy in Warsaw

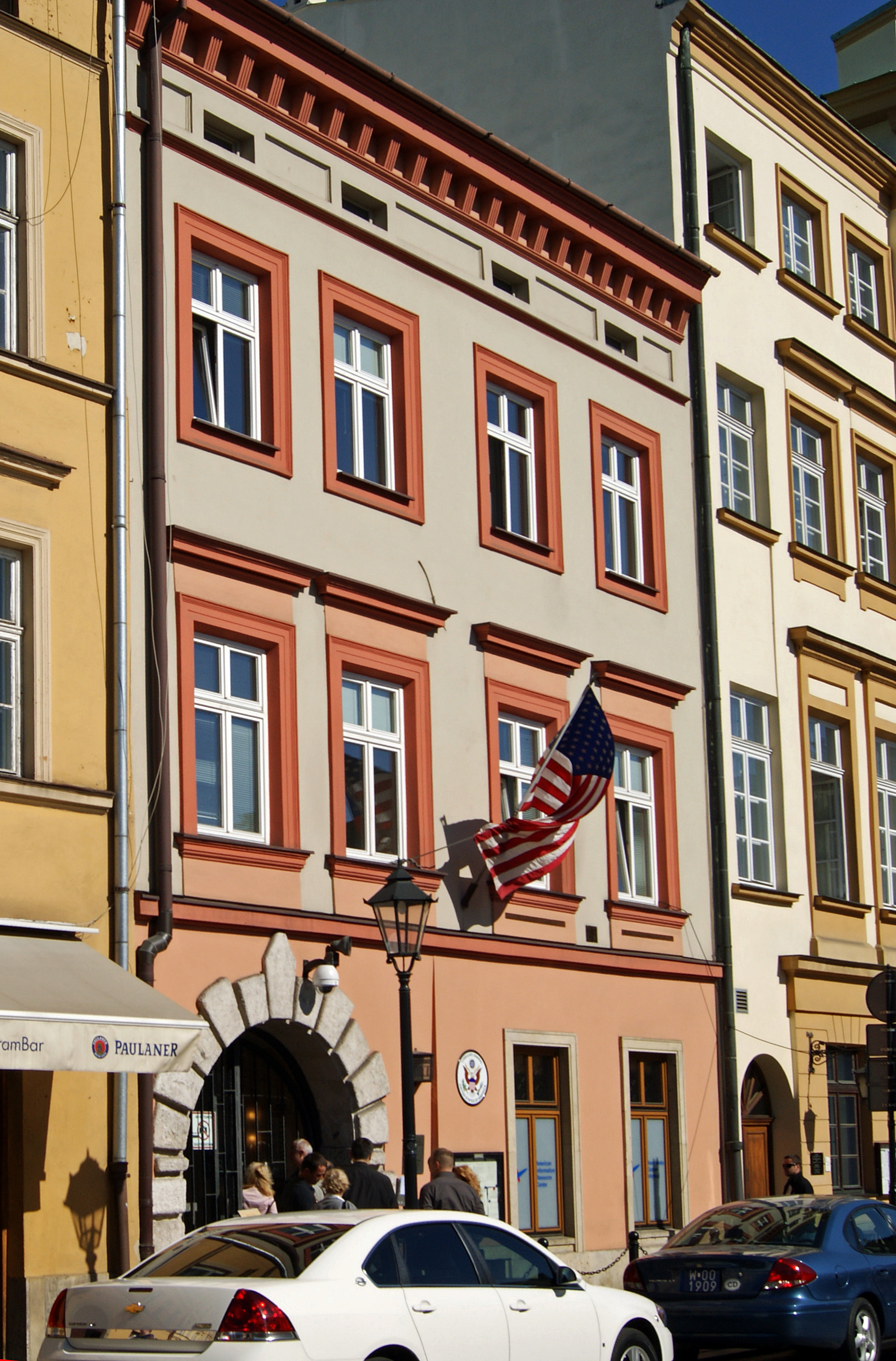
Consulate-General in Krakow

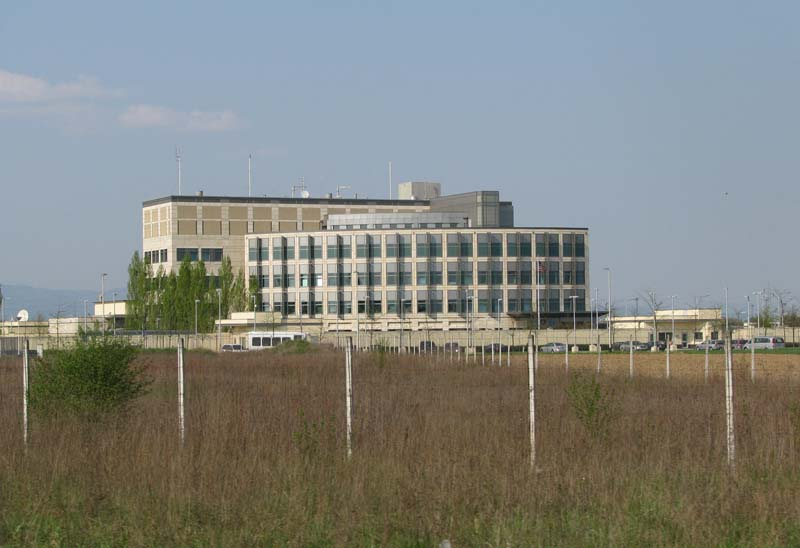
Embassy in Zagreb

=== Oceania ===
The U.S. has embassies in all countries in Oceania it recognizes apart from the Cook Islands, Kiribati, Nauru, Niue, and Tuvalu.

Host country	Host city	Mission	Concurrent accreditation	Ref.
Australia	Canberra	Embassy		
Australia	Melbourne	Consulate General		
Australia	Perth	Consulate General		
Australia	Sydney	Consulate General		
Fiji	Suva	Embassy	Countries: Kiribati; Nauru; Tuvalu	
Marshall Islands	Majuro	Embassy		
New Zealand	Wellington	Embassy	Countries: Cook Islands	
New Zealand	Auckland	Consulate General	Countries: Cook Islands	
Micronesia	Kolonia	Embassy		
Palau	Koror	Embassy		
Papua New Guinea	Port Moresby	Embassy		
Samoa	Apia	Embassy		
Solomon Islands	Honiara	Embassy		
Tonga	Nuku'alofa	Embassy		
Vanuatu	Port Vila	Embassy		

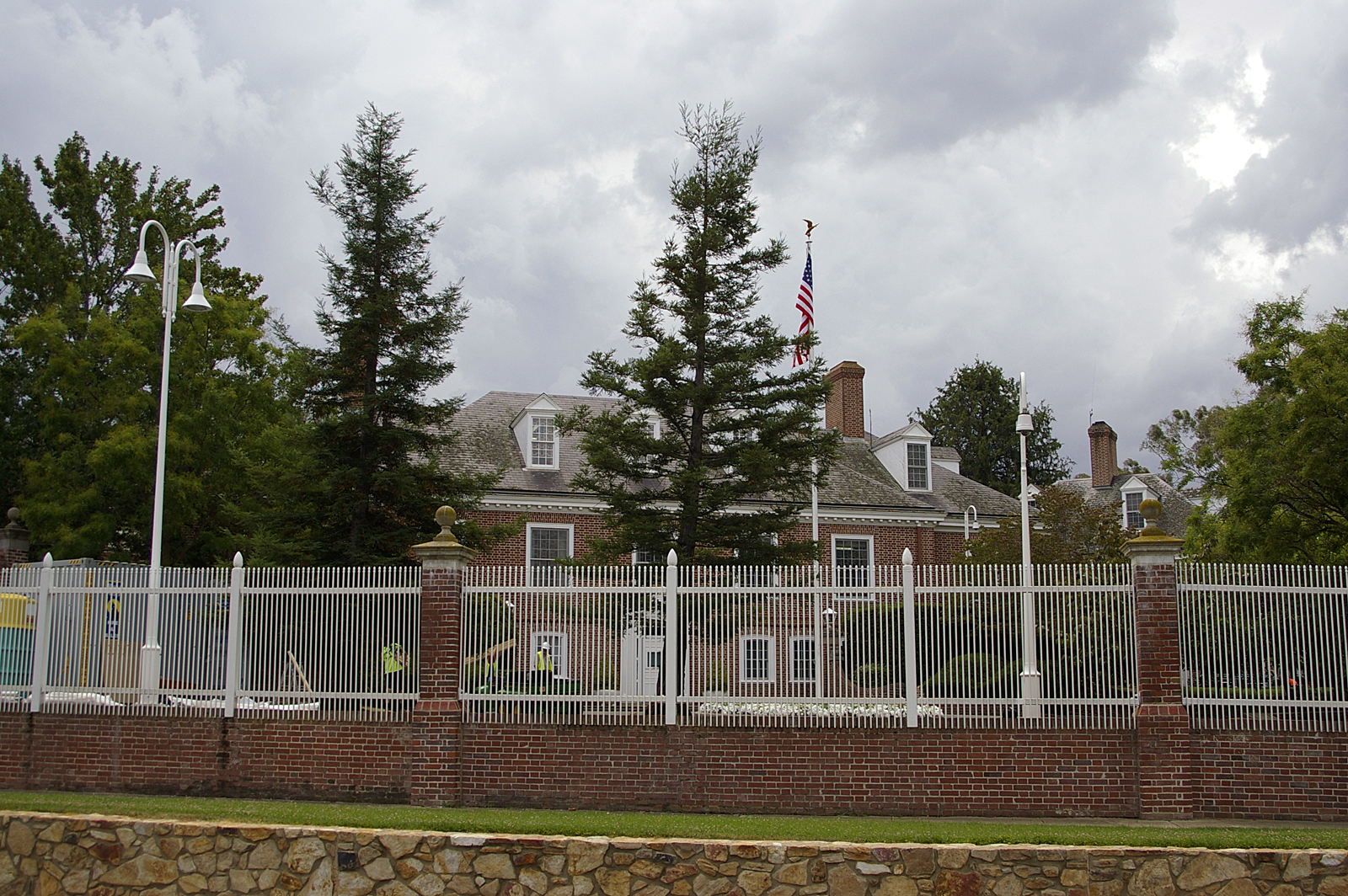
Embassy in Canberra

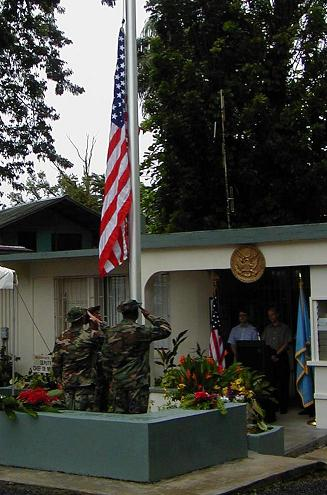
Embassy in Kolonia

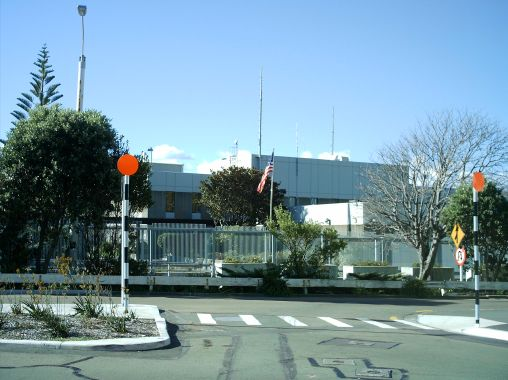
Embassy in Wellington

=== International organizations ===
Organization	Host city	Host country	Mission	Concurrent accreditation	Ref.
African Union	Addis Ababa	Ethiopia	Delegation		
Association of Southeast Asian Nations	Jakarta	Indonesia	Mission		
Asian Development Bank	Manila	Philippines	Delegation		
European Union	Brussels	Belgium	Mission		
ICAO	Montreal	Canada	Delegation		
International Monetary Fund	Washington, D.C.	United States	Permanent Mission		
NATO	Brussels	Belgium	Mission		
Organisation for Economic Co-operation and Development (OECD)	Paris	France	Delegation		
Organization of American States	Washington, D.C.	United States	Delegation		
OSCE	Vienna	Austria	Delegation		
Pacific Community	Nouméa	New Caledonia	Permanent Mission		
United Nations	New York City	United States	Permanent Mission	International Organizations: UNIDO; UNODC; International Fund for Agricultural Development; World Food Programme; Organisation for the Prohibition of Chemical Weapons	
United Nations	Geneva	Switzerland	Delegation	International Organizations: UNIDO; UNODC; International Fund for Agricultural Development; World Food Programme; Organisation for the Prohibition of Chemical Weapons	
United Nations	Nairobi	Kenya	Permanent Mission	International Organizations: UNIDO; UNODC; International Fund for Agricultural Development; World Food Programme; Organisation for the Prohibition of Chemical Weapons	
United Nations	Rome	Italy	Delegations	International Organizations: UNIDO; UNODC; International Fund for Agricultural Development; World Food Programme; Organisation for the Prohibition of Chemical Weapons	
United Nations	Vienna	Austria	Delegations	International Organizations: UNIDO; UNODC; International Fund for Agricultural Development; World Food Programme; Organisation for the Prohibition of Chemical Weapons	
UNESCO	Paris	France	Delegation		
World Bank	Washington, D.C.	United States	Permanent Mission		
World Trade Organization	Geneva	Switzerland	Permanent Mission		

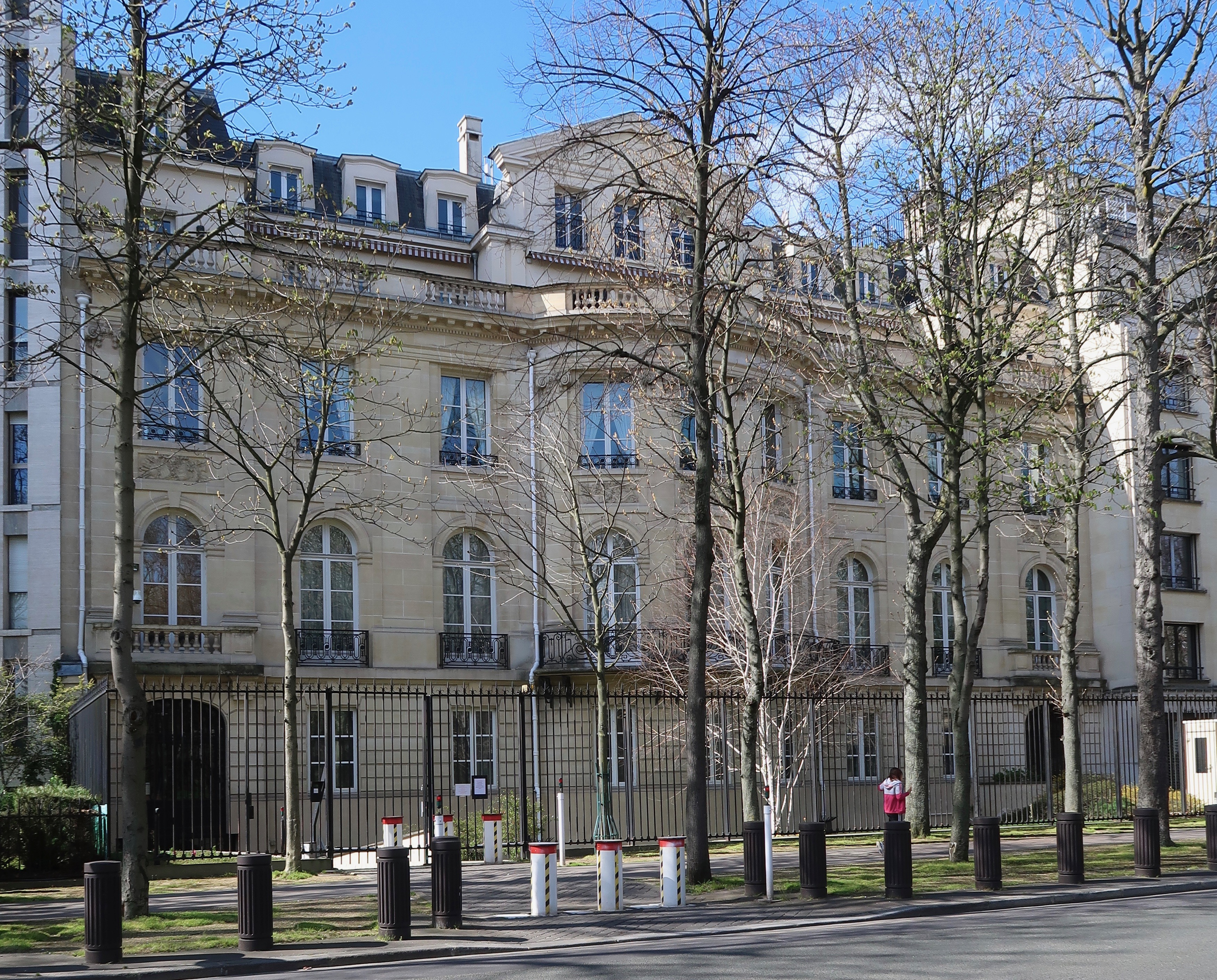
Permanent Mission to the OECD in Paris

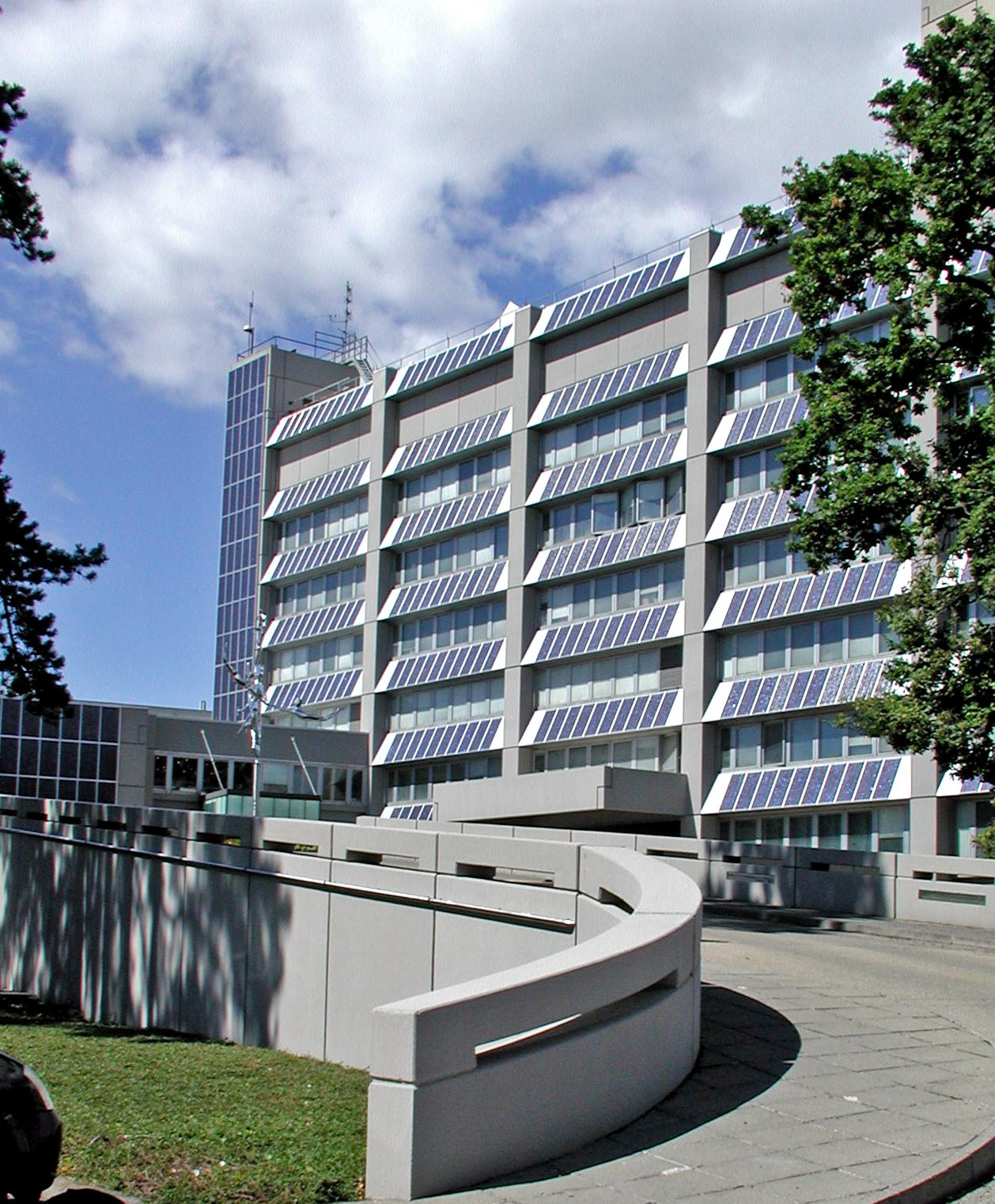
Permanent Mission to the United Nations in Geneva

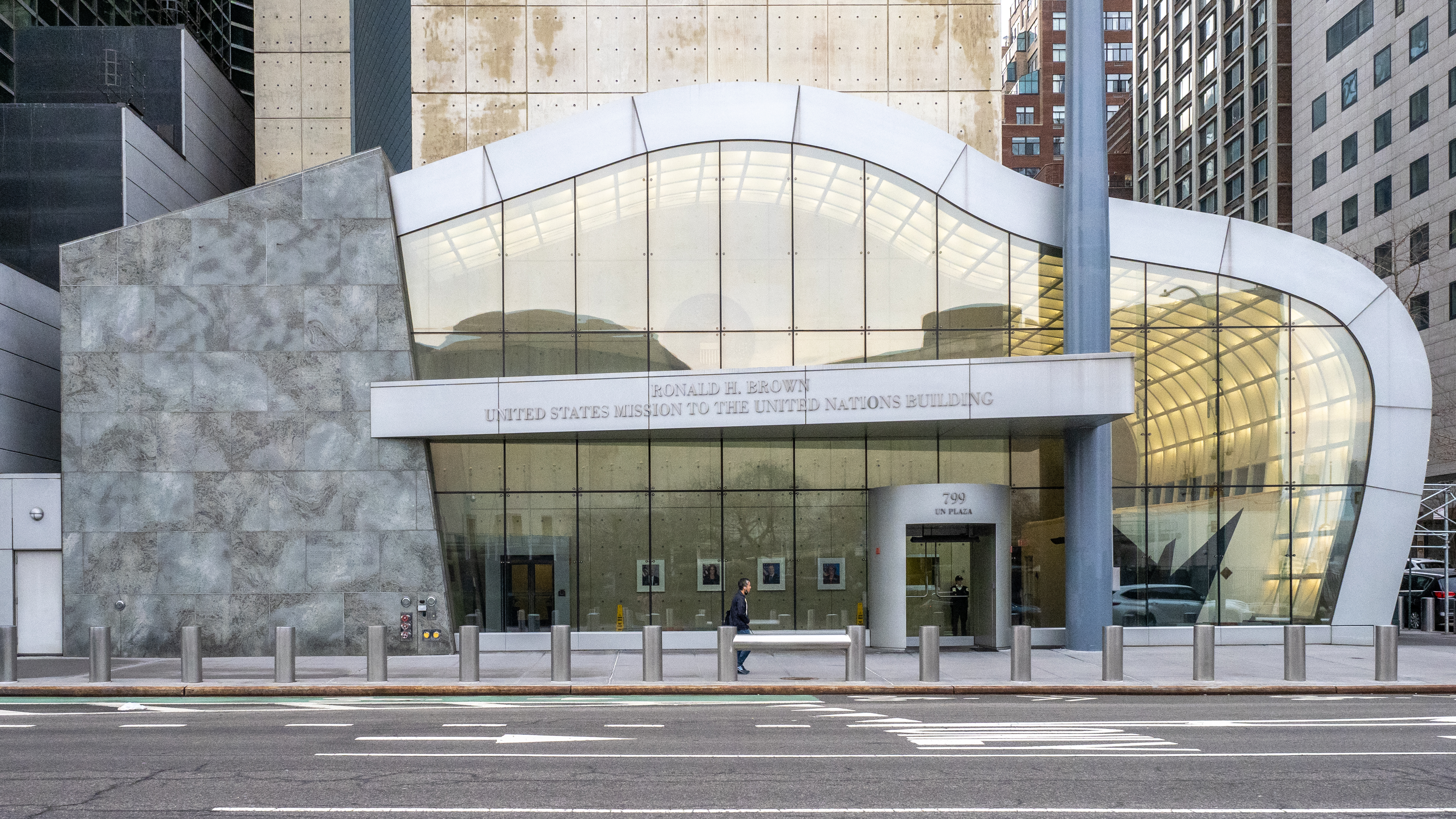
Permanent Mission to the United Nations in New York City

== Closed missions ==
=== Africa ===
Host country	Host city	Mission	Year closed	Ref.
French Algeria	Annaba	Consulate	1944	
Algeria	Constantine	Consulate	1972	
Algeria	Oran	Consulate	1993	
British Kenya	Mombasa	Consulate	1953	
Egypt	Alexandria	Consulate-General	2018	
Guinea-Bissau	Bissau	Embassy	1998	
Libya	Tripoli	Embassy	2014	
Libya	Benghazi	Consulate General	2012	
Spain	Tangier	Legation	1956	
Nigeria	Kaduna	Consulate General	1956	
Sudan	Khartoum	Embassy	2023	
Zaire	Bukavu	Consulate	Unknown	
Zaire	Kisangani	Consulate	Unknown	
Zaire	Lubumbashi	Consulate General	1995	

=== Americas ===
Host country	Host city	Mission	Year closed	Ref.
Antigua and Barbuda	St. John's	Embassy (Note: Continues as a consular agency.)	1994	
Colombia	Cartagena	Consulate	1948	
Texas	Austin	Legation	1849	
Venezuela	Maracaibo	Consular Agency	2019	

=== Asia ===
Host country	Host city	Mission	Year closed	Ref.
Afghanistan	Kabul	Embassy	2021	
China	Nanjing	Embassy	1950	
China	Qingdao	Consulate General	1950	
Taiwan	Taipei	Embassy (Note: Continues as an American Institute in Taiwan.)	1979	
China	Chengdu	Consulate General	2020	
Iraq	Basra	Consulate General	2018	
Iran	Tehran	Embassy	1979	
Iran	Tabriz	Consulate General	1979	
Israel	Haifa	Consular agency	2019	
Japan	Yokohama	Consulate	1973	
Philippines	Cebu City	Consulate	Unknown	
Philippines	Davao City	Consulate	Unknown	
South Vietnam	Saigon	Embassy (Note: Continues as a consulate-general nowadays.)	1975	
South Yemen	Aden	Embassy	1969	
Syria	Damascus	Embassy	2012	
Turkey	İzmir	Consulate General	1993	
Yemen	Sana'a	Embassy (Note: Resident in Riyadh, Saudi Arabia)	2015	

=== Europe ===
Host country	Host city	Mission	Year closed	Ref.
Belarus	Minsk	Embassy	2022	
Germany	Bremen	Consular agency	2018	
Germany	Stuttgart	Consulate General	1995	
Italy	Genoa	Consulate General	1993	
Italy	Palermo	Consulate	1994	
Norway	Bergen	Consulate	1953	
Portugal	Porto	Consulate	1966	
Soviet Union	Odesa	Consulate	1991	
Sweden	Gothenburg	Consulate	1988	
Russian Empire	Odesa	Consulate	1918	
Russia	Saint Petersburg	Consulate General	2018	
Russia	Vladivostok	Consulate General	2020	
Russia	Yekaterinburg	Consulate General	2021	
Ukraine	Lviv	Consular	2022	
United Kingdom	Birmingham	Consulate	1965	
United Kingdom	Bradford	Consulate	1953	
United Kingdom	Bristol	Consulate	1948	
United Kingdom	Cardiff	Consulate	1963	
United Kingdom	Glasgow	Consulate	1965	
United Kingdom	Kingston upon Hull	Consulate	1948	
United Kingdom	Liverpool	Consulate	1962	
United Kingdom	Manchester	Consulate	1963	
United Kingdom	Newcastle-on-Tyne	Consulate	1953	
United Kingdom	Plymouth	Consulate	1948	
United Kingdom	Southampton	Consulate	1948	

=== Oceania ===
Host country	Host city	Mission	Year closed	Ref.
Hawaiian Kingdom	Honolulu	Legation	1893	
Republic of Hawaii	Honolulu	Legation	1898	

== Missions to open ==
Country	Host city	Mission	Ref.
Antigua and Barbuda	St. John's	Embassy	
Cook Islands	Avarua	Embassy	
Dominica	Roseau	Embassy	
India	Ahmedabad	Consulate	
Kiribati	South Tarawa	Embassy	
Libya	Tripoli	Embassy	
Niue	Alofi	Embassy	
Syria	Damascus	Embassy	

== See also ==
- Ambassadors of the United States
- History of United States diplomatic relations by country
- List of countries by number of diplomatic missions
- List of diplomatic missions in the United States
- United States Foreign Service
- Diplomatic Security Service
- List of consular districts of the United States
- Timeline of United States diplomatic relations
