= SS City of Rio de Janeiro =

American passenger ship built in 1878; sank in 1901

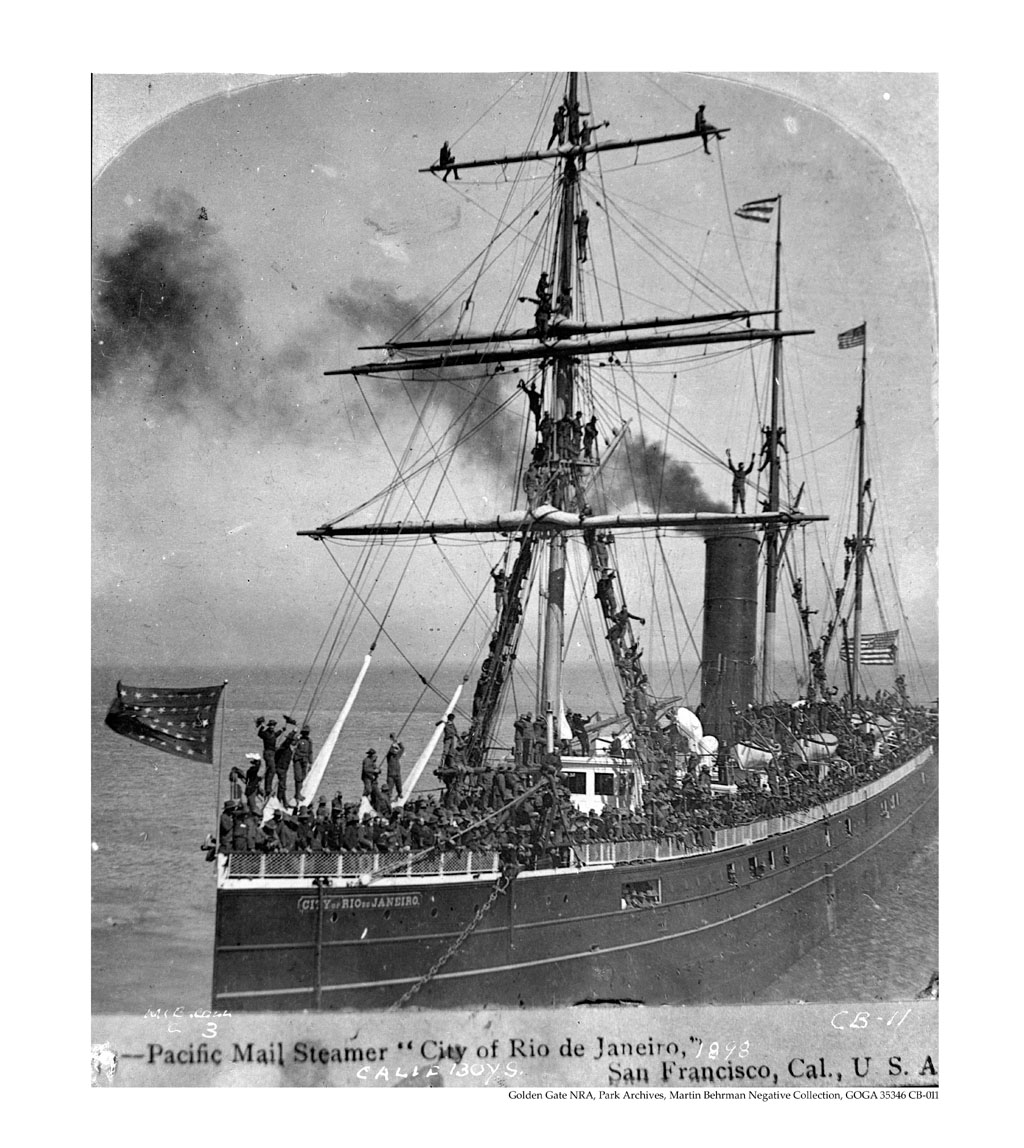
- Rio de Janeiro in 1898

History

United States
- Name: City of Rio de Janeiro
- Namesake: Rio de Janeiro
- Operator: United States & Brazil Mail Steamship Company; Pacific Mail Steamship Company (from 1881)
- Route: San Francisco to Honolulu, Hawaii, Yokohama, Japan and Hong Kong
- Builder: John Roach & Son, Chester, Pennsylvania
- Launched: 6 March 1878
- Fate: Sank 22 February 1901, San Francisco Bay

General characteristics
- Tonnage: 3500
- Length: 370 ft (110 m)
- Beam: 39 ft (12 m)
- Draft: 21 ft (6.4 m)
- Depth: 31 ft 6 in (9.60 m)
- Propulsion: 6 boilers, compound engine, single screw
- Sail plan: Barquentine rig
- SS Rio de Janeiro Shipwreck
- U.S. National Register of Historic Places
- NRHP reference No.: 88002394
- Added to NRHP: 11 November 1988

SS City of Rio de Janeiro was an iron-hulled steam-powered passenger ship, launched in 1878, which sailed between San Francisco and various Asian Pacific ports. On 22 February 1901, the vessel sank after striking a submerged reef at the entry to San Francisco Bay while inward bound from Hong Kong. Of the approximately 220 passengers and crew on board, fewer than 85 people survived the sinking, while 135 others were killed in the catastrophe. The wreck lies in 287 feet (87 m) of water just off the Golden Gate and is listed in the National Register of Historic Places as nationally significant.

City of Rio de Janeiro was one of many ships that were lost due to challenging navigational conditions in this area.

== History ==
Launched on 6 March 1878, the City of Rio de Janeiro was originally built for the United States & Brazil Mail Steamship Company, a two-ship shipping line between Brazil and the United States. This proved unprofitable, and she was sold to the Pacific Mail Steamship Company in 1881 and refitted to serve as an ocean liner, traveling between her home port in San Francisco to Honolulu, Hawaii, Yokohama, Japan and Hong Kong.

Alfred Daniel Jones, the Consul General of the United States in Shanghai died on board in 1893. He had had a nervous breakdown in Shanghai. He became violent and had to be restrained with manacles while on board. He raved incessantly for a number of days before dying.

In early March 1896, she ran out of coal while on passage between San Francisco and Hawaii, only reaching Honolulu by burning her wooden topmasts and deckhouses as fuel. In 1898 the US Government leased the ship for a short time to ferry troops to Manila in the Philippines as part of the Spanish–American War. After the war, she went back to her usual Pacific route.

== Sinking ==
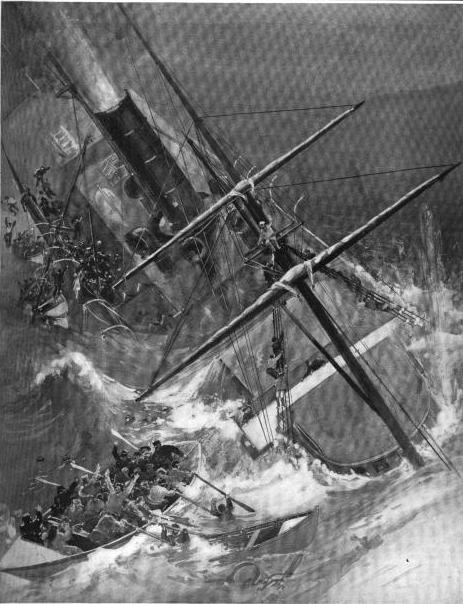
An artist's depiction of the sinking.

On 22 February 1901, while trying to pass through the Golden Gate in heavy fog, en route to her home port of San Francisco, the City of Rio de Janeiro collided with rocks, reportedly on the southern part of the straits at or near Fort Point, and sank stern first.

The damage to the ship was considerable. Much of the entire underside of the vessel had been ripped open by the collision, allowing seawater to rapidly fill the cargo holds and engine room. The ship was built in 1878, before watertight bulkheads came into use, thus it sank in less than ten minutes. The wreck was later found in 287 feet (87 m) of water.

There was much confusion because the officers were English-speaking Americans, while the seamen were non-English-speaking Chinese. The result was that few lifeboats were launched.

The catastrophe happened quickly and in dense fog. The lookout at the Fort Point Lifesaving Station, only a few hundred yards away, was unaware of the situation for two hours, until a lifeboat was sighted emerging from the fog. Fortunately Italian fishermen were nearby and were able to rescue survivors clinging to floating wreckage. One of those rescuers, Gaspare Palazzolo of Terrasini, Sicily, Captain of the boat Citta di N.Y., was awarded a gold medal by the Banco Italo-Americana di San Francisco for his heroism.

Of the 210 people aboard, 82 were rescued but 128 people died. The captain, William Ward, was among the dead. He had previously said that if ever faced with such a situation, he would go down with his ship. Among those lost in the wreck was Rounsevelle Wildman, the US Consul General at Hong Kong, and his wife and two children, who had been en route for Washington DC to participate in the inauguration of William McKinley.

== Aftermath ==
Soon after the sinking of the SS City of Rio de Janeiro, the United States Congress approved funding for a lighthouse on Mile Rocks, where the sinking took place. A bell buoy had been previously placed in 1889 by the United States Lighthouse Service near the rocks; however, strong currents in the area would pull the buoy beneath the surface of the water and set it adrift. An appropriation of $7000 was also made to establish a fog signal on Fort Point, approximately one and a half nautical miles away from Mile Rocks.

== Cargo ==
After the shipwreck, rumors circulated that the ship's cargo had included a substantial amount of gold and silver, but her manifest listed no such cargo. However, the manifest did list 2,423 slabs of tin, each of which weighed 107 pounds (49 kg). The ship's insurers paid a sum of $79,000 for the loss of the metal, which on December 13, 2014, market prices would be worth in excess of $2,900,000.

== Salvage attempts ==
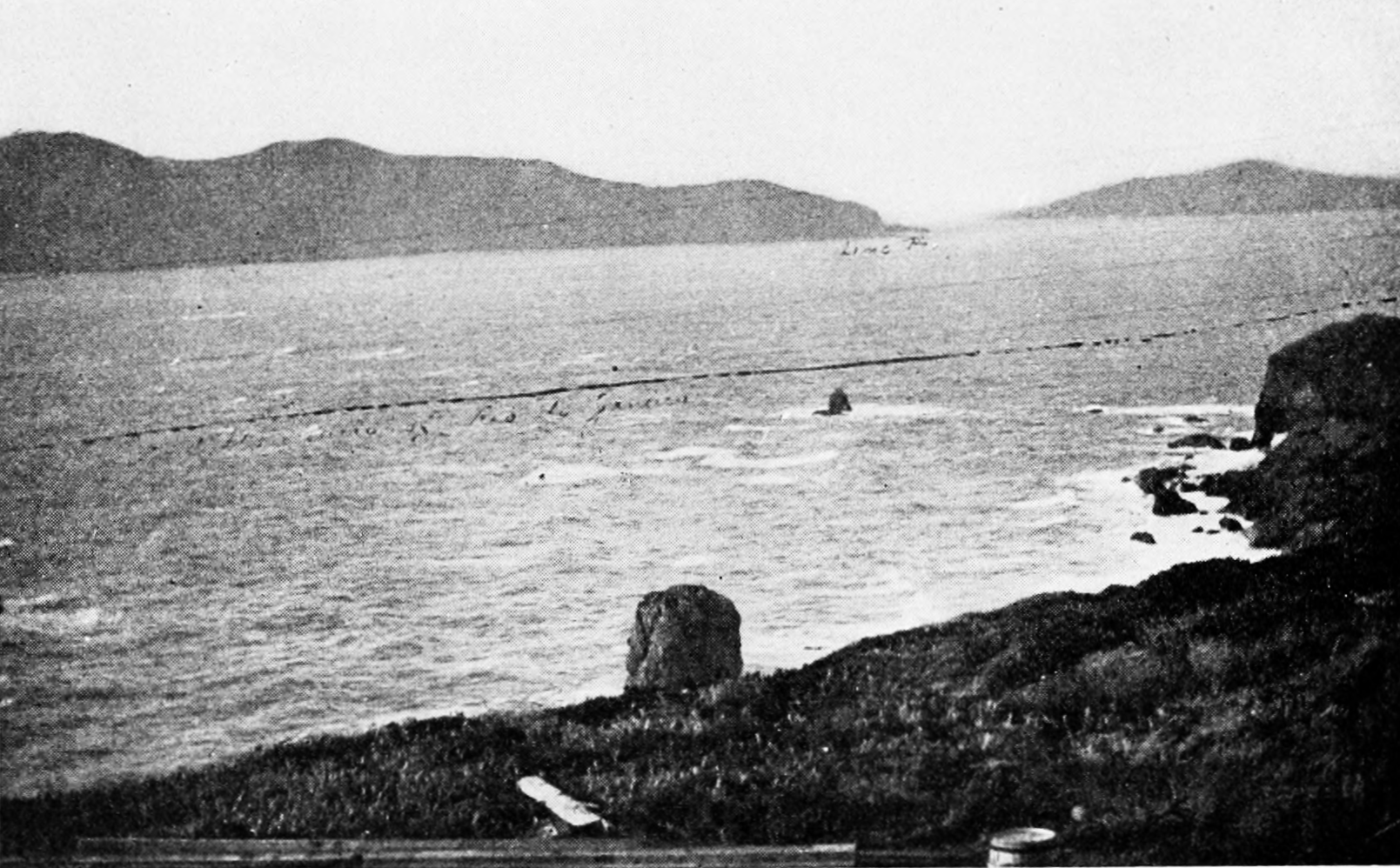
Photo with a line showing the probable course of the SS City of Rio de Janeiro as published by Popular Science Monthly in 1901

Divers engaged by the Pacific Mail Line immediately began a search for the ship but failed to find any traces of it due to the depth of the water in the area, well beyond the diving or salvage capabilities of the time.

For several years after the disaster, bodies washed up on the beach near Fort Point, including, in July 1902, the remains of Captain Ward, which were identified by the watch chain wrapped around his rib cage.

On November 15, 1905, the Los Angeles Herald reported that divers had found the wreck. It was asserted that there was no doubt of the identity of the wreckage found. One diver had a narrow escape from death during his exploration of the bottom of the Golden Gate.

In 1917, a wooden keg clearly marked Rio de Janeiro surfaced off Point Lobos. In 1919, more wreckage from the ship surfaced off Suisun Bay, 40 miles (64 km) away from the assumed site of the wreck between Mile Rock and Baker Beach.

Off Baker Beach, the currents are too strong and the water too deep for anyone other than professional divers. It has also been suggested that the currents may have pushed the ship out to sea as she sank, while some say that she could not be found because of the number of wrecks on the seabed in the area, and that even using modern sonar it would be impossible to distinguish whatever remains of the ship from all the other disintegrated remnants of sunken ships.

In 1931 Captain Haskell made a formal claim for the cargo and fabric of the wreck by right of discovery; he announced to a news conference that he had discovered the wreck using a two-man submarine of his own invention and planned to salvage $6 million worth of silver from the wreck. However, he disappeared without a trace in July 1931.

In 1987, Gus Cafcalas, a San Francisco-area mortgage banker, announced that he and four other men had discovered the wreck the previous fall in 200 feet of water, half a mile west of the Golden Gate Bridge, aided by sonar and photographs taken by a robot submarine. Cafcalas said they would not attempt to raise the ship because the condition of the hull and fierce tides and currents made the task virtually impossible, but that they hoped to probe the ship's interior for the rumored cargo of silver. He said the consortium was prepared to spend $1 million to salvage whatever was left on the wreck.

Cafcalas and his partners applied for a salvage permit from the California State Lands Commission under the name Segamb, Inc. (listed in several media reports as "Seagamb Corp."), and on February 6, 1989, the Commission authorized the issuance of a permit "for survey and mapping purposes, and retrieval of an object or objects sufficient to positively identify the shipwreck", subject to numerous conditions. However, Segamb never met the conditions, and the authorization was revoked on January 17, 1990.

The wreck of the Rio de Janeiro was located again in November 2014 and imaged in detail using sonar. There are no plans to salvage her.
