= Thomas R. Jernigan =

American politician (1847–1920)

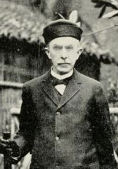

Consul General of the United States, Shanghai
- In office 1893–1897
- Preceded by: Alfred Daniel Jones
- Succeeded by: John Goodnow

Personal details
- Born: 24 February 1847 Barfield, Hertford County, North Carolina, United States of America
- Died: 1 November 1920 (aged 73)

Thomas Roberts Jernigan (1847–1920) was US consul in Kobe, Japan (1885–1889), and later US consul general in Shanghai, China (1893–1897). After leaving the diplomatic service he was Standard Oil Company's attorney in China, and served as chairman of the Shanghai International Settlement. From 1905, he went into private practice as a lawyer with Stirling Fessenden under the firm name Jernigan and Fessenden.

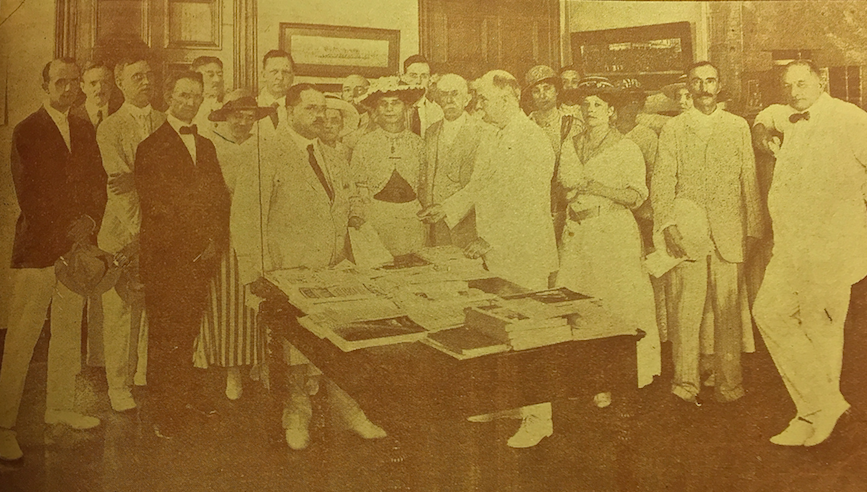
United States Consul General Thomas Sammons hands a cheque to Edward Isaac Ezra to purchase the US Consulate premises in Shanghai in 1916. Jernigan, standing in between Sammons and Ezra, acted for the consulate.

Jernigan Road (now, Xianxia Road (仙霞路)) in Shanghai was named after him. He wrote a number of works on Chinese economics.

Jernigan died in 1920 and was buried on a hill overlooking Nanjing. He is remembered on a plaque in Raleigh, North Carolina (corner of W Cabarrus and S McDowell on the north west side of the Raleigh Convention Centre.)

== Publications ==
- "Banking, Currency and Land Tenure in the Chinese Empire", in A History of Banking in all the Leading Nations, vol. 4 (1896).
- "A Hindrance to Our Foreign Trade", North American Review, Vol. 163, No. 479 (October 1896), pp. 438–447. Available from JSTOR
- "Commercial Trend of China", North American Review, Vol. 165, No. 488 (July 1897), pp. 63–69. Available from JSTOR
- China's Business Methods and Policy (1904). Available on Internet Archive
- China in Law and Commerce (1905). Available on Internet Archive
- Shooting in China (1908). Available on Internet Archive
