= Thomas Sammons =

Thomas Sammons may refer to:

- Thomas Sammons (politician) (1762–1838), American politician
- Thomas Sammons (consul) (1853–1935), United States Consul General in Asia and Australia
