= Alfred Daniel Jones =

American diplomat and politician (1857-1893)

Alfred D. Jones

Consul General of the United States, Shanghai
- In office May 6, 1893 – November 24, 1893
- Preceded by: Joseph A. Leonard
- Succeeded by: Thomas R. Jernigan

Wake County Treasurer
- In office 1885

North Carolina House of Representatives
- In office January 7, 1891 – January 3, 1893

Personal details
- Born: Alfred Daniel Jones; 3 July 1857 Cary, Wake County, North Carolina, U.S.
- Died: 9 December 1893 (aged 36) at sea (on board SS City of Rio de Janeiro)
- Party: Democratic
- Education: University of North Carolina at Chapel Hill
- Profession: Lawyer

Alfred Daniel Jones or Buck Jones(July 3, 1857 – December 9, 1893) was an American politician who served in North Carolina and as Consul General of the United States in Shanghai.

== Early life ==
Jones was born in Wake County, North Carolina, the son of Mary Elizabeth Courts and Wesley Jones. His paternal grandfather was Nathaniel Jones who arrived in the area of what is now eastern Cary, North Carolina around 1775 and owned 10,461 acres, including his White Plains plantation. His maternal grandfather was Daniel D. Courts, Esq.

He studied law at the University of North Carolina at Chapel Hill. While there, he was a member of the Dialectic Society. At commencement on June 7, 1877, he gave a speech about the importance of normal institutes called "The Teacher Must be Taught," receiving applause several times during the speech. According to The Observer, he was "congratulated and complimented by a number of prominent gentlemen" after his speech.

== Career ==
Jones was both a lawyer and planter. By May 1886, he had his own law practice in Raleigh, North Carolina with offices at the Court House. He advertised that he could work in all of North Carolina's courts. He tried his first case in January 1877—the State against C. C. Jewell who was charged with selling liquor without a license. Jones demonstrated "skill and tact" as he questioned the witnesses. He also made a "forcible speech" in closing. The jury found Jewell not guilty. The Raleigh Signal praised his performance, writing, "'Buck' has in him the making of an able and successful lawyer, and we doubt not that he will rapidly rise in the legal fraternity."

Around March 1889, he joined Apex, North Carolina attorney Herbert E. Norris to create the firm Jones & Norris. There offices were in over the clerk's offices in the Court House in Raleigh. They practiced in State and Federal court in numerous counties, including Chatham, Harnett, Moore, and Wake. They also advertised collections services and the negotiation of loans.

In November 1880, Jones ran for the North Carolina House of Representatives as a Democrat. His term began January 7, 1891 and ended January 3, 1893. In November 1884, Jones was elected Wake County Treasurer, defeating his opponent John B. Neathery by 4,742 votes to 4,279 votes. As county treasurer, he was bonded for $130,000—$66,000 from Wake County and $64,000 from the State.

Jones was a member of the original Watauga Club which was organized in Raleigh in May 1894 by young professionals who wanted to look toward the future of North Carolina, rather than obsessing about the past. One of their efforts was a successful campaign to create the North Carolina College of Agriculture and Mechanic Arts (now North Carolina State University). Other members of the Watagua Club included Josephus Daniels, Walter Hines Page (also of Cary), and William Joseph Peele.

In 1887, Jones served as the chief marshal for the North Carolina State Fair. In this capacity, he oversaw agricultural, domestic arts, fine arts, mechanical exhibitions.

On May 6, 1893, Jones was appointed to the position of Consul General of the United States in Shanghai, China by President Grover Cleveland. His nomination was supported by both senators from his state and Congressman Benjamin H. Bunn of his district. He took up his office in August 1893.

On November 24, 1893, he handed over the charge of the Consulate General to Vice-Consul William Delaney Hunter.

== Oratory ==
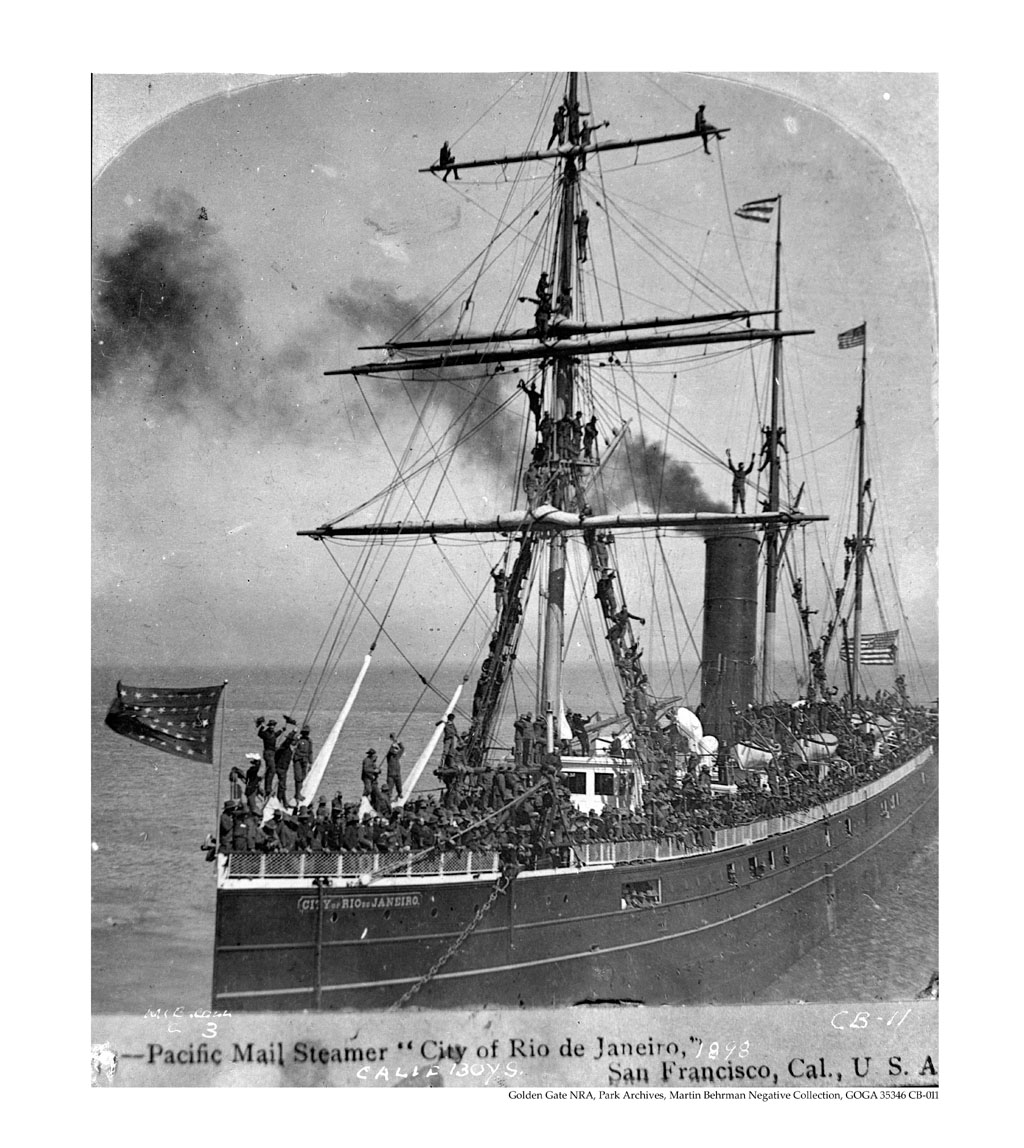
The SS City of Rio de Janeiro

While at the University of North Carolina at Chapel Hill, Jones gained a reputation for oratory and was selected to speak at commencement in 1877. On July 4, 1887, he gave an oration at Metropolitan Hall as part of Raleigh's Fourth of July Celebration.

On May 17, 1888, he gave the literary address for the commencement services at Bule's Creek Academy in Harnett County.

== Personal life ==
In 1880, Jones lived in Cary, North Carolina. He was a Mason and a member of the Knights of Pythias.

Upon his arrival in Shanghai in August 1893, Jones became ill. Newspapers reported that his illness became insanity in November 1893 after a disappointment in a love affair back in North Carolina. Around November 24, 1893, Jones was put on the Saikyō Maru to be returned to America with hopes of improving his health. In Japan, he changed ships to the steamer SS City of Rio de Janeiro. Soon after the steamer left port, he became violent and had to be restrained with manacles by the two marines from Monocacy who were his attendants. He "raved incessantly" for seven days before dying. Later, it was reported that accounts of his mistreatment aboard the SS City of Rio de Janeiro were "sensational."

His body arrived in San Francisco on December 17, 1893, and was embalmed. Senator Matt Whitaker Ransom and Representative Benjamin Hickman Bunn contacted the United States Department of State and made arrangement for Jones' body to be shipped to Raleigh. Once in Raleigh, a special train took Jones to his mother's home in Cary. For this trip, he was joined by Raleigh's Mayor Thomas Badger and North Carolina Secretary of State Octavius Coke.

His funeral was conducted at the White Plains Methodist Episcopal Church in Cary. He received an escort from the military, Masons, and members of the Knights of Pythias. His pall bearers were all Masons including Mayor Badger. Other dignitaries in attendance included Josephus Daniels and G. E. Leech, who both provided wreathes. There were also flowers from United States Secretary of State Walter Q. Gresham.

Jones was buried at his family estate White Plains in Cary with Masonic rituals. His grave is now at Hillcrest Cemetery in Cary.
