= Rounsevelle Wildman =

American journalist (1864–1901)

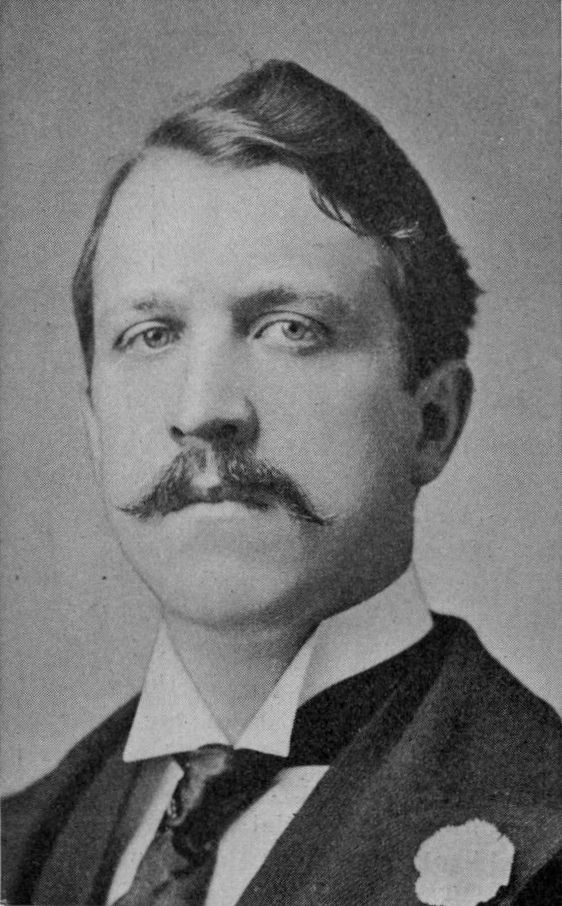
Rounsevelle Wildman

Rounsevelle Wildman (March 19, 1864, in Batavia, New York – February 22, 1901) was an American journalist, a member of the United States Foreign Service, and the owner and editor-in-chief of the literary magazine Overland Monthly from 1894 to 1897.

== Biography ==
His maternal grandfather, Colonel J. P. Rounsevelle, was a leading politician and financier in the state of New York. After education in Lima, New York at Genessee Wesleyan Seminary (of which his father was the president), Rounsevelle Wildman graduated from Syracuse University, where he studied journalism. After experience on newspapers in New York City, Chicago, and Kansas City, he became in 1885 a reporter for the Idaho Statesman in Boise. In Boise, he was an advocate for the Republican Party and gained a literary reputation for his contributions published by magazines in the eastern United States. In June 1890, President Benjamin Harrison, a Republican, appointed him the U.S. Consul in Singapore at the Straits Settlements. During his years in Singapore and its environs, he continued his literary work and was made Special Commissioner for the Smithsonian Institution of the Straits Settlements and Siam. He gathered large collection of valuable anthropological artifacts and sent them to various educational institutions. In recognition of his work, he was elected in 1891 a Member of the Royal Asiatic Society. In January 1893 Harrison appointed him the U.S. Consul at Barmen, Germany. However, in early 1894 the newly elected President Grover Cleveland, a Democrat, appointed one of his own supporters to replace Wildman, who left the U.S. consular service. In Singapore, Wildman befriended Sultan Abu Bakar of Johor, who asked him to go to Chicago in 1893 and take charge of the Johor exhibit at the World's Columbian Exposition. Wildman was also the exposition's Commissioner for the Straits Settlements.

After the end of the exposition, Wildman went to San Francisco and became the owner and editor of the Overland Monthly from 1894 to 1897. His purchase of the Overland Monthly was financed by loans of $1,000 each from Lloyd Tevis, Charles Frederick Crocker, Collis Potter Huntington, Claus Spreckels, Lloyd Tevis, and Wildman's maternal uncle, "Billy" Foote, who was a wealthy lawyer in San Francisco. In 1897 Wildman persuaded James Howard Bridge (1858–1939) to replace him as editor of the Overland Monthly. From 1893 to 1897, Wildman published several magazine articles describing his experience in the Malay Archipelago.

When President William McKinley, a Republican, took office in 1897, he appointed Wildman as the U.S. Consul to Hong Kong. In early 1898 he was promoted to the position of Consul General. When the Spanish–American War started in April 1898, the U.S. Pacific Fleet under the command of Commodore George Dewey went to Manila Bay and destroyed the Spanish fleet in the Battle of Manila Bay. While stationed in Hong Kong, Wildman delivered to Commodore Dewey the White House's dispatches ordering the attack in Manila Bay. Wildman functioned as a go-between for messages to and from Commodore Dewey and officials in Washington, D.C. Wildman was heavily involved with Emilio Aguinaldo and the Filipino armed forces who since 1896 were fighting for Filipino independence from Spain. The 1898 Treaty of Paris caused fighting to begin in February 1898 between Filipino independence forces and U.S. troops. Wildman's brother, Edwin Wildman Jr., who served under him as Vice-Consul in Hong Kong, wrote a book about Aguinaldo and the conflict in the Philippines.

In June 1890 in Washington, D.C., Rounsevelle Wildman married Leticia Sherman Aldrich (1865–1901). Rounsevelle and Leticia Wildman and their two children drowned in the February 1901 sinking of the S.S. City of Rio de Janeiro. The family was returning to the United States to participate on March 4, 1901, in the second inauguration of William McKinley.

== Selected publications ==
- Wildman, Rounsevelle (1894). The Panglima Muda: A Romance of Malaya.
- Wildman, Rounsevelle (1899). Tales of the Malayan Coast: From Penang to the Philippines.
