= Charles Denby Jr. =

American diplomat (1861–1938)

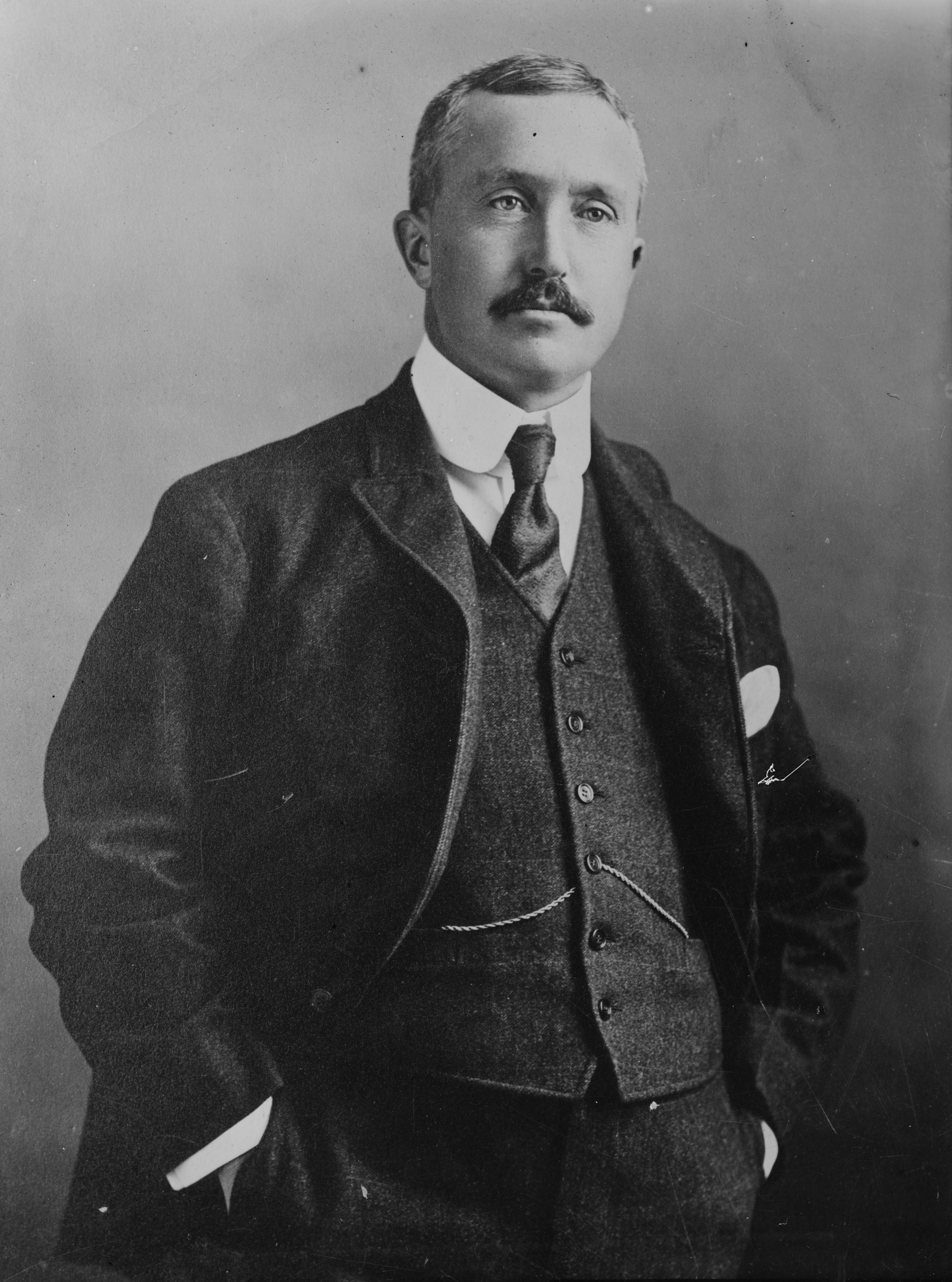
- Denby in 1915

Consul General of the United States, Shanghai
- In office 1907–1909
- Preceded by: James Linn Rodgers
- Succeeded by: Amos Parker Wilder

Consul General of the United States, Vienna
- In office 1909–1915

Personal details
- Born: November 14, 1861 Evansville, Indiana
- Died: February 15, 1938 (aged 76) Washington, D.C.

Charles Denby Jr. (November 14, 1861 – February 15, 1938) was an American diplomat in China and later in Vienna, Austria-Hungary and was known as one of the top scholars of Chinese language and culture of his time.

== Life ==
Charles Denby Jr. was born in Evansville, Indiana, to Charles H. Denby, who served as US Minister to China for many years, and Martha Fitch. His maternal grandfather, Graham N. Fitch was a United States representative and senator. His brother, Edwin Denby, was a United States representative and United States Secretary of the Navy. Charles was educated by private tutors before receiving his B.A. from Princeton University in 1882.

== Career ==
In 1885, Charles Jr. accompanied his father to China as second secretary to the US legation, and in 1894 he was promoted to first secretary.

After increasing incidents of riots against missionaries in China (such as the ones in 1891 in Nanjing and Yichang and 1895 in Chengdu) he became a supporter of a stronger US government support of American missionaries in China.

During the First Sino-Japanese War, he mediated many of the negotiations between China and Japan, and was the chief draftsman of the Treaty of Shimonoseki that ended the war. In 1900, he was appointed as secretary general of the provisional government in Tianjin, China during the Boxer Rebellion, and then from 1902 to 1905 he served as the chief foreign adviser to the Viceroy of Zhili, Yuan Shikai.

In 1905, he returned to the United States to become chief clerk in the State Department. In 1907, he returned to China as United States Consul General in Shanghai and two years later in 1909 was made Consul General in Vienna where he served until 1915. From 1915 to 1917 he served as president of Hupp Motor Car Company in Detroit. When America entered WWI, he re-joined the foreign service and became Director of the Bureau of Foreign Agents of the War Trade Board. In 1918 he went to China as a special agent of the State Department and was special representative of the United States Shipping Board in China and Japan during 1922 to 1923. Charles retired in 1923 to Washington, D.C., where he later died.

== Marriage and children ==
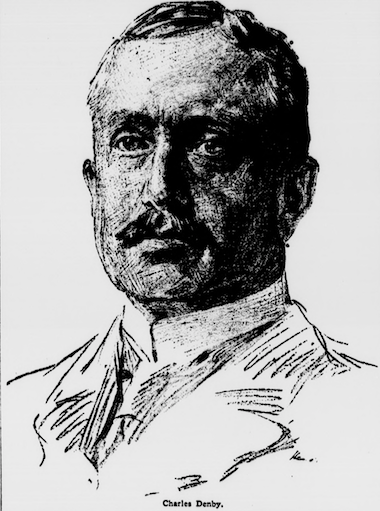
Portrait of Denby from 1916

Denby married Martha Dalzell Orr in 1895. They had three sons James Denby (also in the foreign service), Charles Denby, and Edwin Denby, a noted dance critic and poet.

== See also ==
- List of law clerks for the second seat of the Supreme Court of the United States
