= Edwin Cunningham (diplomat) =

American diplomat (1868-1953)

Edwin Sheddan Cunningham
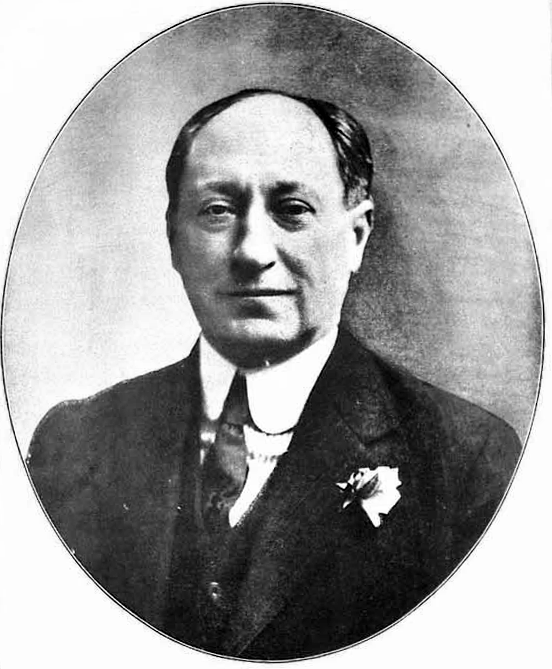

Consul General of the United States, Singapore
- In office 1912–1914

Consul General of the United States, Hankow
- In office 1914–1919

Consul General of the United States, Shanghai
- In office 1919–1935
- Preceded by: Thomas N. Sammons
- Succeeded by: Monnett Bain Davis

Personal details
- Born: July 6, 1868 Maryville, Tennessee, US
- Died: January 20, 1953 (aged 84) Maryville, Tennessee, US

Edwin Sheddan Cunningham (July 6, 1868 – January 20, 1953) was an American diplomat who served for many years in China, retiring as United States Consul General in Shanghai.

== Early life and education ==
Cunningham was born July 6, 1868, in Maryville, Blount County, Tennessee, the son of Major Ben and Jane Ann (Sheddan) Cunningham.

He graduated from Maryville College in Maryville, Tennessee, and received an LL.B. from the University of Michigan at Ann Arbor.

== Career ==
Following graduation Cunningham worked in a law publishing house in Rochester, New York and then practiced law in Maryville from 1896 to 1898.

In 1898, Cunningham was appointed consul to Aden, Arabia, and transferred to Bergen, Norway, in 1903. In 1906, he became consul to Durban, South Africa, and from 1910 to 1912, served as consul to Bombay, India. Cunningham also served as United States consul-general to Singapore from 1912 to 1914.

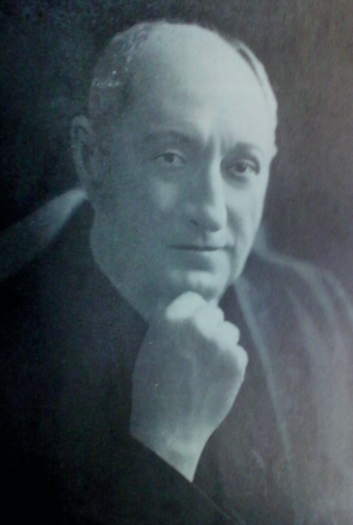
Cunningham in 1935

He served as consul general to Hankow, China, from 1914 to 1919 was then appointed consul-general in Shanghai, serving from 1920 to 1935. He was Chairman of the Court of Consuls between 1924 and 1925. From June 1926 he served as the dean of the consular corps.

In 1930, he was admitted to the bar of the United States Court for China on 25 August 1930 by Judge Milton D. Purdy.

He retired at the end of 1935 at the age of 67 having gone past the normal retirement age of 65 at the special request of the United States Secretary of State, Cordell Hull.

== Honours ==
In 1932, Maryville College awarded him an honorary LLD and the University of Michigan conferred an honorary Master of Arts in 1938.

== Marriage ==
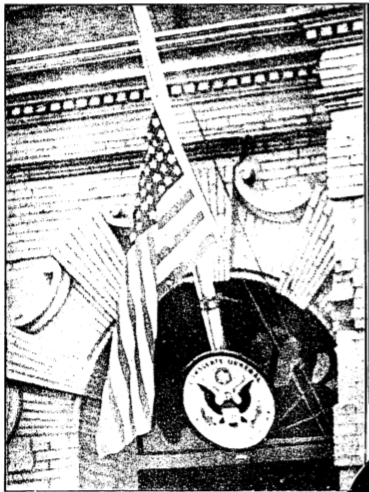
Flag of the United States at half mast mourning Rhoda Cunningham at the entrance to US Consulate, Shanghai in 1934.

Cunningham married Elizabeth Rhoda Israel (who went by the name Rhoda) on November 14, 1911, in London, England. Rhoda died in 1934 in Hangzhou, China and a funeral service was conducted in Shanghai on April 7, 1934, at the Holy Trinity Cathedral, Shanghai.

== Death ==
Cunningham died at his home in Maryville, Tennessee on 20 January 1953.
