= Ships lost in San Francisco =

Many ships have wrecked in and around San Francisco Bay. For centuries San Francisco Bay, with its strong currents, rocky reefs, and low fog conditions has experienced more than a hundred shipwrecks. Ever since San Francisco Bay was encountered during the land expedition of Gaspar de Portolà in 1769, it has been one of the most popular harbors.

During the California Gold Rush, thousands of ships sailed in and out of San Francisco. The sea became the cheapest way to bring goods to the growing city. From 1848 to 1869, ships carried 500,000 passengers to and from San Francisco. Many fishing and whaling vessels navigated the waters of San Francisco Bay. In the 1880s San Francisco was a whaling capital of the United States.

== Partial list of lost ships ==
=== Caroline Amelia ===
Caroline Amelia, a Danish bark, wrecked on Mile Rocks on March 19, 1850. The Daily Alta California wrote:

Danish bark Caroline Amelia, which cleared on the 16th inst. for Costa Rica, was wrecked on the Mile Rocks in the offing yesterday morning. She was running for "the needles" when the breeze suddenly died away and a strong ebb tide set her in shore. She dropped anchors but her chain cables parted, and, in spite of all the exertions of the officers and crew she was driven by force of the current directly upon the above named rocks, staving an ugly hole in her bottom. Being an old ship her timbers soon gave way and filling steadily she went down in about ten fathoms [60 ft; 18 m] of water, entirely out of sight. The captain succeeded in getting his chronometers, instruments, clothes, and money out of the ship before she sunk, and the crew saved all their dunnage.

=== Golden Fleece ===
Golden Fleece was a 968-ton clipper. It was wrecked on April 22, 1854, as it was exiting Golden Gate on a voyage way to Manilla. The wreck occurred at the rocks near Fort Point. The Daily Alta California wrote that "lying broadside OR to the rocks... bilged and full of water, her mainmast is gone, also the fore and main top mast". On April 22, 1854, the wreck was sold in a public auction and "The purchasers of the wreck are busily engaged stripping her of everything moveable, at the same time preparations are being made to raise her... The sails, rigging, guns, &C., saved by the consignee of the ship, were sold at auction yesterday, the two brass pieces bringing $580 [equivalent to $20,800 today]".

=== Granada ===
Granada was a 1,058 91/95-ton sidewheel steamship. It was wrecked because of the break in her main steam line on October 13, 1860. It lost power and was dragged ashore near Fort Point. In two days the steamer became a total loss and a local attraction. The Daily Alta California wrote that "The Granada was visited by crowds of people yesterday, as she lay high and dry beyond Fort Point". The wreck was sold on the auction and the salvaging began: "men... were taking the machinery out, and assisting the waves to break to pieces what is left of her".

=== Rescue ===
Rescue was a 139-ton tugboat that was wrecked at Point Bonita on October 3, 1874. Though it was built to rescue other boats, it was not able to rescue itself after it struck rocks in a dense fog. A pleasure passenger, Thomas Markey, was swept into the ocean. His body was never recovered.

=== Frank Jones ===
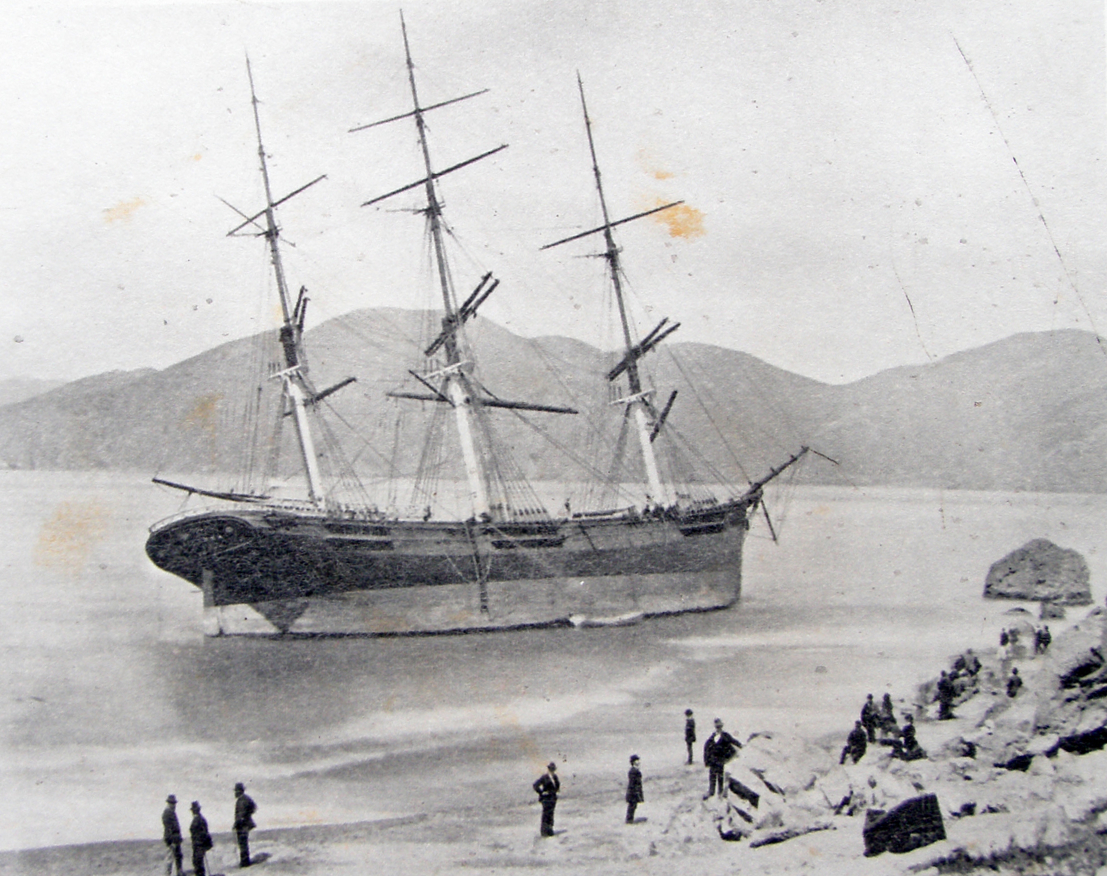
Frank Jones off Fort Point in 1877

Frank Jones wrecked on March 30, 1877, while leaving San Francisco on a voyage to Manila. It was attached to the tugboat Monarch, but the hawser (mooring rope) parted. Although another hawser was passed to Frank Jones, it parted as well. The anchor's chain proved to be too short to secure the vessel, and she was carried ashore around near Fort Point. The wreck was sold at Merchant's Exchange, but two attempts to bring the wreck to the beach for repair failed.

=== King Philip ===
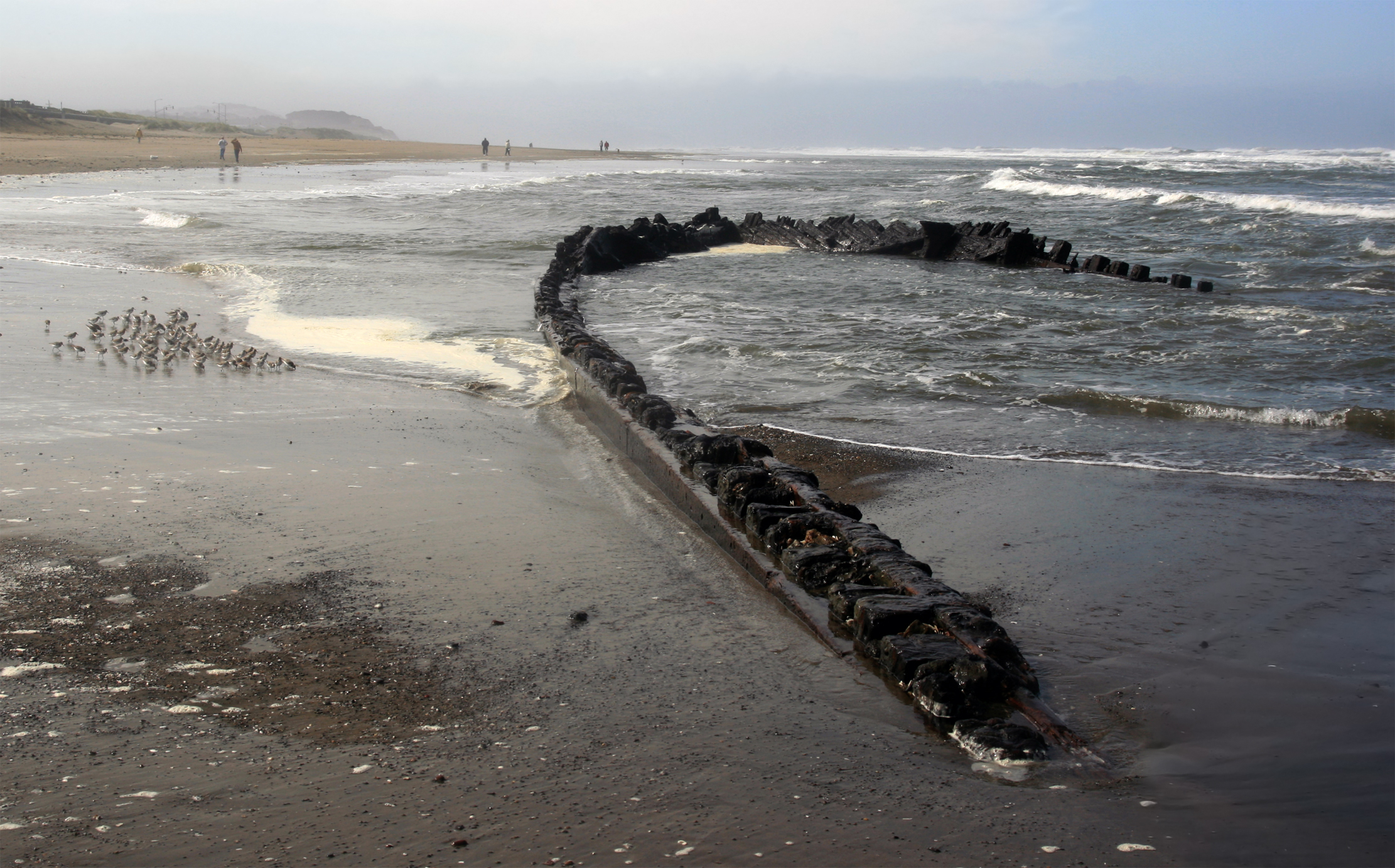
The wreck of the King Philip (stern) as it was seen in May 2011

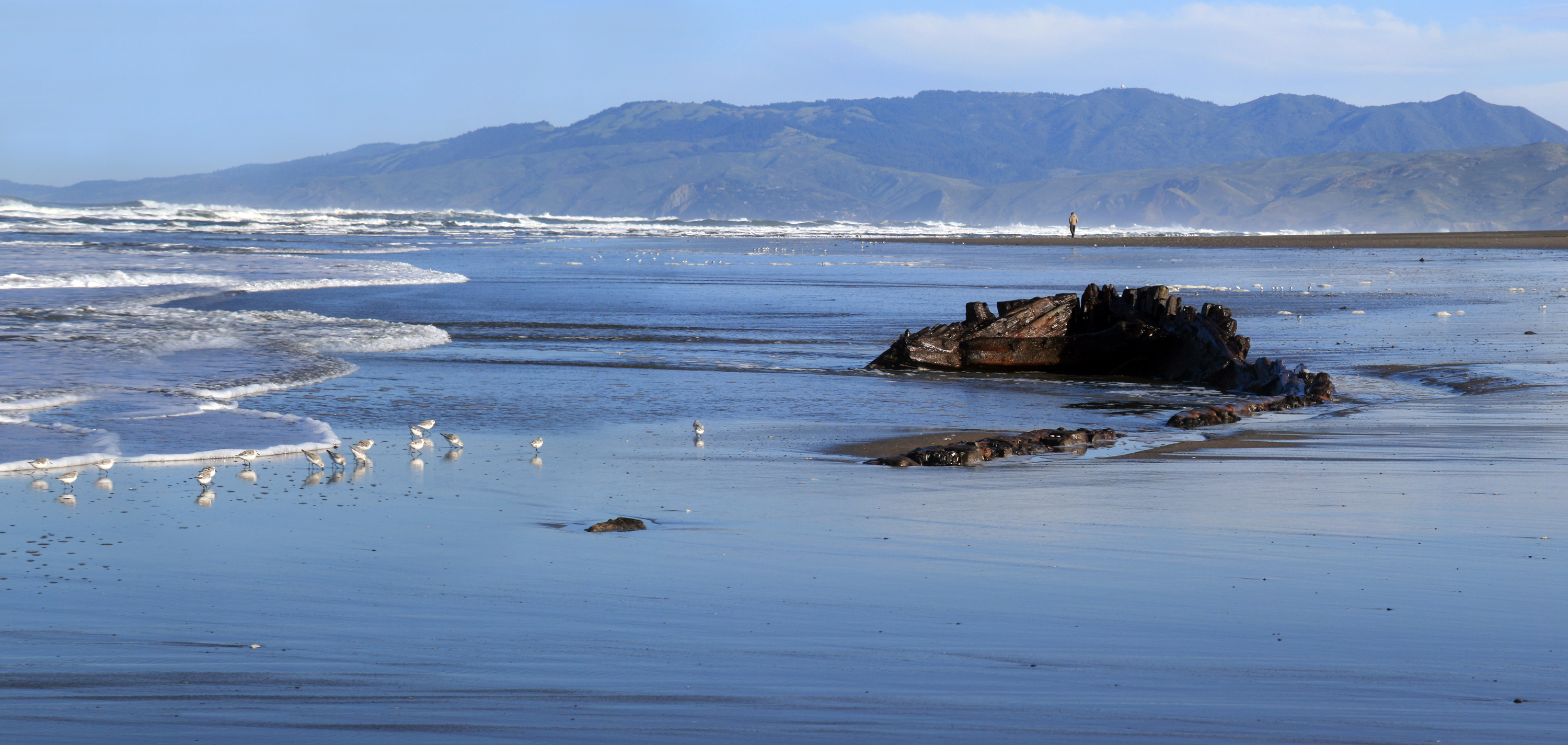
The wreck of the King Philip (bow) as it was seen in April 2011

King Philip, a 1,194 40/95-ton three-masted ship, was wrecked on January 25, 1878. The wreck occurred in low wind conditions that could not support its sails. A towboat was called to help another clipper, Western Shore, and did not help King Philip. It was carried ashore at Ocean Beach in San Francisco. The San Francisco Chronicle wrote that "Yesterday morning at and after daylight the sea was breaking well up to the vessel, and she moved very uneasily at times, but later in the day it appeared as if she had settled down in the sand... she was immovable". The tide was low and the sailors were able to get off the ship and walk to the beach. The wreck, which was buried in the sand, is the most preserved wreck of a wooden clipper ship off the coast of California.

Left in place at extreme low tide level in 1878, what is left of the wreck of the King Philip is usually covered in sand. Sometimes, as the profile of the sand on the beach shifts and changes, the timbers reemerge and are visible during low tide. The wreck was partially visible when the schooner Reporter wrecked on the same site on March 13, 1902. Contemporary accounts noted that the Reporter was "fast digging her own grave alongside the bones of the "King Philip", whose ribs are still seen..." The wrecks of both ships were buried in 1910 when a large amount of sand was pushed on to the beach as sand dunes were bulldozed during construction of the Great Highway. The first documented re-exposure came in 1982. Another re-exposure occurred in 1983. In March of that year, National Park Service archaeologist James Delgado documented the site with fellow archaeologist Martin T. Mayer. The wreck was re-exposed in May 1984 to a hitherto unseen level of exposure, when Delgado and a larger team returned to document more of the hull. That project determined the ship was nearly half intact (45%) from the keel to the 'tween deck level, which was still partially sheathed in "yellow", or Muntz metal, and was ballasted with rocks from San Francisco's Telegraph Hill. Tangled wire rope, rigging elements, and timbers from the schooner Reporter were also found mixed into the hull. In 1984, the wreck was exposed extensively enough to allow exploration by divers. After its appearance in 1985, the wreck was not visible for 22 years. The construction of the Ocean Beach sewer outfall resulted in more dumping of sand on Ocean Beach. This caused the ship to be buried again. It was re-exposed in November 2010, three years after its previous appearance. As of April 2011, the wreck was again visible, this time to the same extent as it had been in 1984. Stephen Haller, the park historian for the Golden Gate National Recreation Area of the National Park Service, says that the King Philip is the best-preserved wreck of a wooden ship in the San Francisco Bay area, which has a total of approximately 200 old shipwrecks.

=== SS City of Chester ===
The coastal steamer City of Chester, bound for Eureka with 90 passengers on the morning of August 22, 1888, sank six minutes after colliding with the liner Oceanic, which was arriving from Asia. Initial news reports criticized the Chinese crew of the Oceanic, but they were later praised after their bravery in rescuing many passengers from the City of Chester became known.

In May 2013 a NOAA crew surveying another nearby shipwreck extended their survey to try to find the City of Chester and discovered it "sitting upright, shrouded in mud, 216 feet [66 m; 36 fathoms] deep at the edge of a small undersea shoal".

There are no plans to raise the wreck, but an exhibit at the San Francisco headquarters of the Gulf of the Farallones National Marine Sanctuary is planned.

=== SS City of Rio de Janeiro ===
SS City of Rio de Janeiro was an iron hulled steam powered passenger ship. The opinion of the United States Court of Appeals for the Ninth District described the wreck:

The steamship Rio de Janeiro, whose home port was San Francisco, on entering the bay of San Francisco on the 22d day of February, 1901, on one of her return trips from Hong-Kong and intermediate ports, struck a reef of rocks near the Golden Gate, and, within 20 minutes, sank beneath the waters, carrying down a large number of passengers and crew and all her cargo.The record shows that the disaster occurred about half-past 5 in the morning. * * * The fog was so dense that the day afforded no light. It was very dark, but the water was smooth, and there was but little, if any, list to the ship as she sank. * * * She carried 211 persons and 11 lifeboats, 3 of which were swung by davits from the sides of the ship, and 8 of which were on skids out the roof of the deck houses.

Only 79 passengers were saved. In July 1902, the partly decomposed body of the ship's captain, William Ward, was found in the pilothouse that had been torn from the bulk and washed ashore at Baker Beach.

=== Yosemite ===
Yosemite was a single-ended, 827-ton steam schooner. It was wrecked on February 7, 1926, near Point Reyes, approximately 30 miles (50 km) WNW of San Francisco. At the time of the wreck, it contained 25 tons of dynamite as cargo. After receiving a distress signal, the nearby schooner Willamette rescued the crew. Yosemite was then tugged to San Francisco, but detached from the tugboat and on February 8, 1926, drifted to Ocean Beach around Cliff House and broke apart on impact. Some speculated that the dynamite exploded, others believed that the schooner was broken by the surf. The San Francisco Chronicle wrote that "Whatever the cause, the ship was splintered to atoms". The Lurline pier was damaged by wreckage. According to the Chronicle, "Thousands of spectators crowded the beach for the next few days, picking up souvenirs and posing for pictures amidst the wreckage."
