= James Rodgers (consul) =

American diplomat and Consul General (1861-1930)

James L. Rodgers
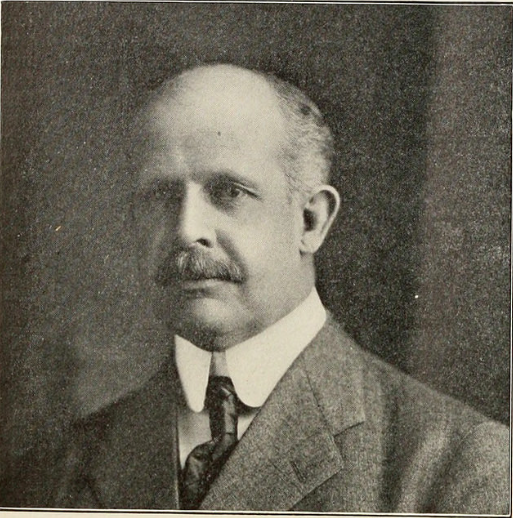

Consul General of the United States, Shanghai
- In office 1905–1907
- Preceded by: John Goodnow
- Succeeded by: Charles Denby Jr.

Consul General of the United States, Havana
- In office 1907–1916

Consul General of the United States, Montreal
- In office 1918–1920

Personal details
- Born: 10 September 1861 Columbus, Ohio, United States
- Died: 3 February 1930 (aged 68) Columbus, Ohio, US

James Linn Rodgers (September 10, 1861 - February 3, 1930) was an American diplomat who served as United States Consul General to Shanghai, Havana and Montreal in the early 20th century.

== Early life ==
Rodgers was born on September 10, 1861, in Columbus, Ohio, the son of Andrew Denny Rodgers, a prominent businessman, and Eliza Sullivant Rodgers. He was educated at Ohio State University and was for nine years editor of the Columbus Dispatch. He also served in the Ohio state troops where he attained the rank of Colonel. In 1895 he was appointed private secretary by Governor elect Ada Bushnell and served as private secretary until 1900 when Bushnell left office. He was then a member and sometimes president of the state game and fish commission.

== Diplomatic career ==
In 1905, Rodgers was appointed United States Consul General in Shanghai, serving until 1907 when he was transferred to be US consul-general in Havana, Cuba where he served until 1916. In 1916 he was appointed by the State Department as special agent to the de facto government of Venustiano Carranza pending the confirmation by the Senate of Henry P. Fletcher as ambassador to Mexico. In 1918, he was appointed United States Consul General in Montreal. He resigned from the position on October 31, 1920.

== Post-retirement ==
Post retirement Rodgers represented the Pure Oil Company in negotiations with the Venezuelan government and later was associated with the foreign department of the Foundation Company in New York.

== Family ==
Rodgers married Miss Frances Fay of Ohio. They had one daughter Francis Russell Rislinger and a son, James Linn Rodgers Jr.

== Death ==
Rodgers died on February 3, 1930, of heart disease in Columbus, Ohio, and was buried at Green Lawn Cemetery in Columbus following funeral services at the Trinity Church.
