= John Goodnow =

American businessman and diplomat (1858–1907)

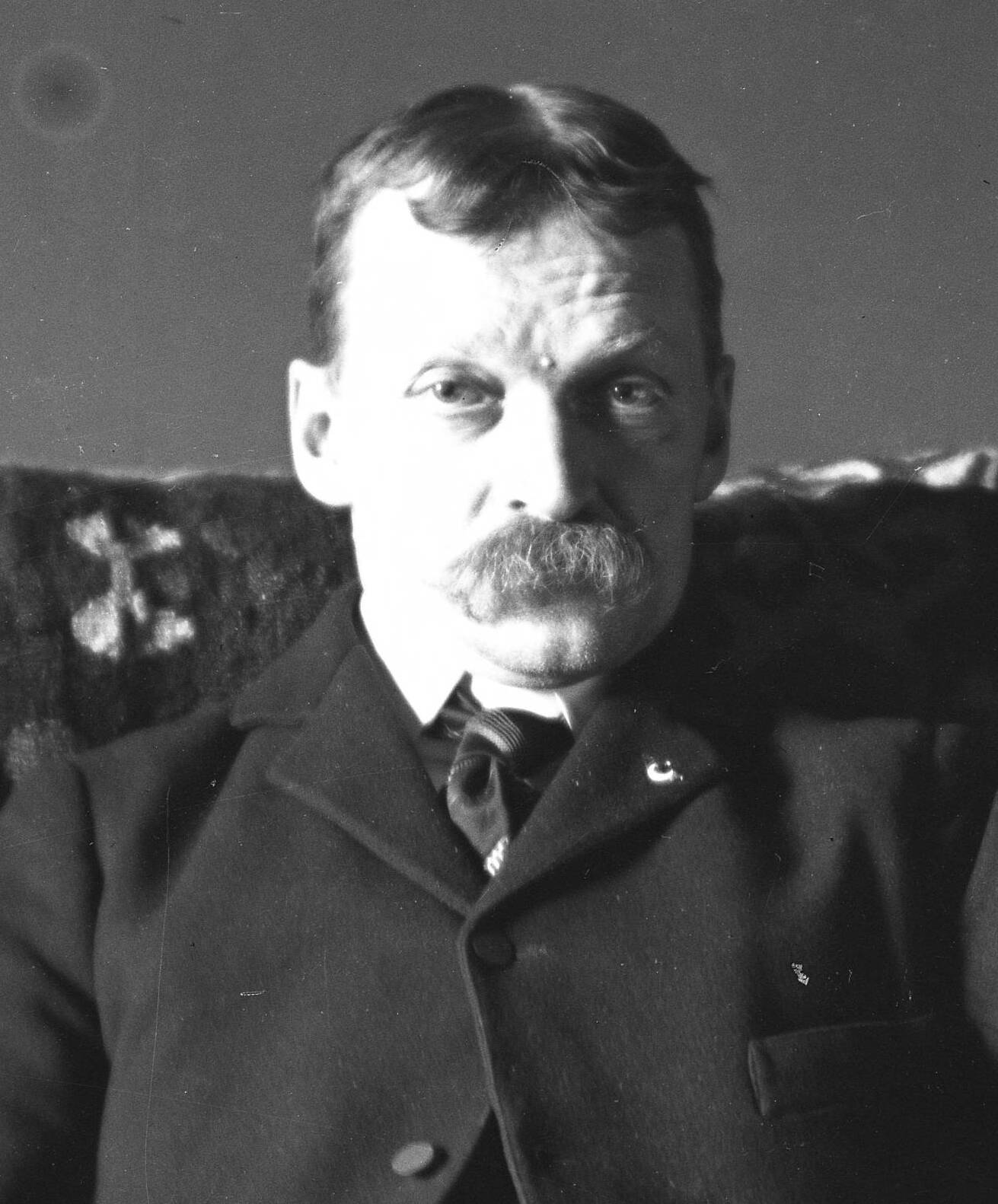

Consul General of the United States, Shanghai
- In office 1897–1905
- Preceded by: Thomas R. Jernigan
- Succeeded by: James Linn Rodgers

Personal details
- Born: 29 June 1858 Greensburg, Indiana, United States of America
- Died: 7 December 1907 (aged 49) Málaga, Spain

John Goodnow (June 29, 1858 – December 7, 1907) was a businessman and American diplomat who served for eight years as United States Consul General in Shanghai.

== Early life ==
Goodnow was born June 29, 1858, in Greensburg, Indiana, the son of Lt Col. James Goodnow of the 12th Indiana Volunteers. He attended the University of Minnesota and resided in Minneapolis until 1897.

== Diplomatic career ==
In 1897, Goodnow was nominated for the position of United States Consul-General in Shanghai, China by Republican President William McKinley. He had been president of the Republican State League. His nomination had been opposed by Republicans in his home state. However, the Senate approved the nomination.

Goodnow resigned from the foreign service in 1905 following an investigation into misconduct in office. The alleged misconduct included permitting the transfer of Chinese ships to the US flag under a fraudulent bill of sale; irregularity of accounts; improper threat of legal proceedings and breaking and entering into premises of a US Citizen.

== Death ==
Goodnow died of diaphragmatic paralysis in Málaga, Spain on December 7, 1897. He was buried in the English Cemetery, Málaga.

In 2007, journalist Alfonso Vázquez, a contributor to the newspaper La Opinión de Málaga, located the gravestone of John Goodnow in the English Cemetery of Málaga. The discovery was made beside the Anglican church of Saint George, where the stone lay partially hidden beneath debris, foliage, and discarded materials—a reflection of the cemetery's neglected condition at the time. The gravestone confirmed that Goodnow, former Consul General of the United States in Shanghai, died in Málaga in 1907 and was buried there. However, in subsequent years, the gravestone has gone missing and is currently considered lost.
