= Thomas Sammons (consul) =

Thomas N. Sammons
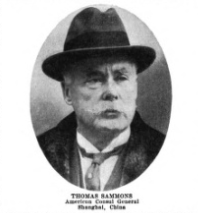

Consul General of the United States, Melbourne
- In office 1920–1924

Consul General of the United States, Shanghai
- In office 1914–1919
- Preceded by: Amos Parker Wilder
- Succeeded by: Edwin Cunningham

Personal details
- Born: 7 February 1863 Fonda, New York, U.S.
- Died: 15 October 1935 (aged 72) Chicago, Illinois, U.S.
- Education: New York Law School (LLB); George Washington University

Thomas N. Sammons (February 7, 1863 – October 15, 1935) was an American diplomat who served for many years in Korea, Japan and China before retiring as United States Consul General to Australia.

== Early life ==
Sammons was born February 7, 1863, in Fonda, New York, the youngest of seven children of John and Julia Flynn Sammons who were Irish immigrants.

He attended public schools in Albany, New York and then university at New York Law School and George Washington University. Following graduation, he first worked as a telegraph operator and then became a reporter and editor. From 1898 to 1905 he worked as a private secretary to United States Senator Addison G. Foster of Washington.

== Career ==
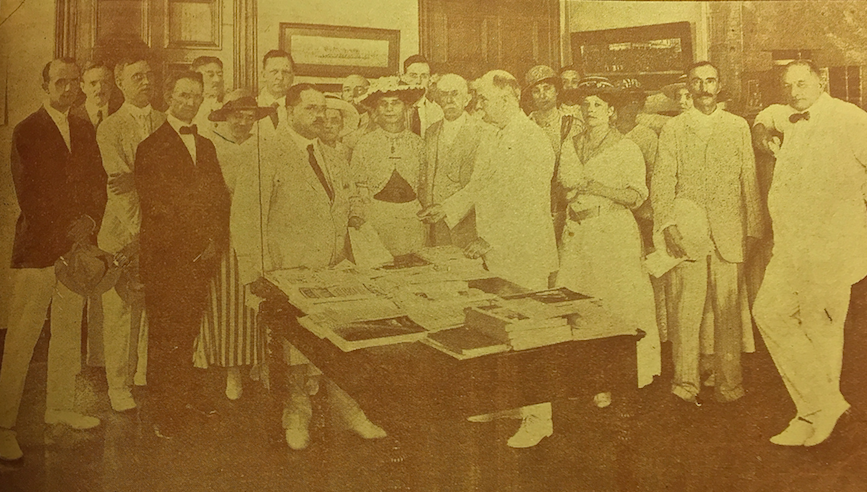
Sammons handing a check to Mr Edward Ezra in 1916 in payment for the site of the US Consulate in Shanghai.

In 1905, Sammons was appointed United States Consul-General in Manchuria, China, being first assigned to Niuzhuang (now Yingkou) and then Mukden (now Shenyang) and Andong (now Dandong). He was involved with the negotiations relating to the opening of the ports under the Treaty between the United States and China for the extension of the commercial relations between them signed in 1903 as a follow-up to the Boxer Protocol. From 1907 to 1909 he was US consul-general to Korea and between 1909 and 1913 he was US Consul-General in Yokohama, Japan. Sammons was appointed United States Consul General in Shanghai, serving from 1914 to 1919 when he was transferred to be US consul-general in Melbourne, the then capital of Australia. In 1921, he was slated to become United States Minister to China, but the appointment did not proceed.

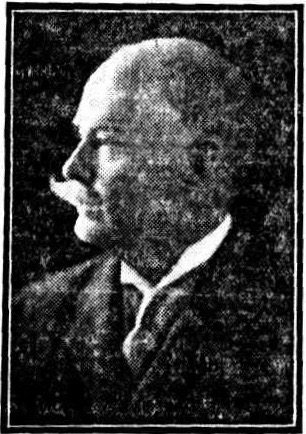
Sammons on his arrival in Australia in 1919

He retired in 1925 due to ill health.

== Family ==
Sammons married Elizabeth Wheeler on 30 October 1888. They had a son, Wheeler. Wheeler became publisher of Systems Magazine and Who's Who in America.

== Death ==
Sammons died at his home at 536 Deming Pl. in Chicago on October 15, 1935, after suffering from Parkinson's Disease for almost 10 years.
