= Mile Rocks Lighthouse =

Lighthouse in California, United States

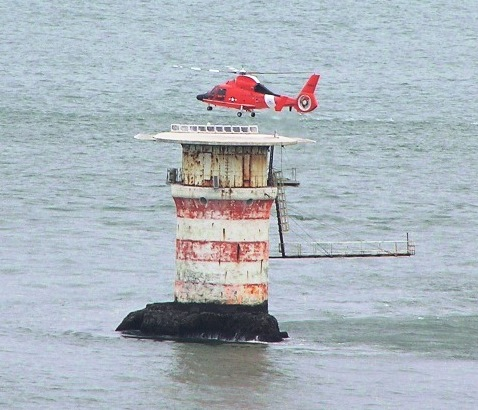
- Mile Rocks Lighthouse with helicopter landing on the top
- Location: offshore Lands End; San Francisco; California; United States
- Coordinates: 37°47′34″N 122°30′37″W

Tower
- Constructed: 1906 (first)
- Foundation: massive reinforced concrete enclosed with steel plates basement
- Construction: steel tower
- Automated: 1966
- Shape: cylindrical tower with aerobeacon and helipad on the top (current); 3-stage cylindrical tower with balcony and lantern (first)
- Markings: white and red horizontal bands tower (current) white tower
- Power source: solar power
- Operator: United States Coast Guard
- Fog signal: blast every 30s. continuously

Light
- First lit: 1966 (current rebuilt)
- Focal height: 49 feet (15 m)
- Lens: 3rd order Fresnel lens (original), aerobeacon (current)
- Range: 15 nmi (28 km; 17 mi)
- Characteristic: Fl W 5s.

Mile Rocks Lighthouse is located on a rock about 2.3 miles (3.7 km) southwest of the Golden Gate Bridge, off of Lands End in San Francisco, California. It was completed in 1906, replacing a nearby bell buoy. In 1966, the light was automated, and the original 85 ft (26 m) tower of the lighthouse was demolished and replaced by a helipad. The lighthouse was at one time painted with alternating red and white rings, but as of 2017, the lighthouse is painted plain white.

== History ==
In 1889, the United States Lighthouse Service placed a bell buoy near the rocks. However, strong currents in the area would pull the buoy beneath the surface of the water and set it adrift.

On February 22, 1901, the SS City of Rio de Janeiro wrecked on the rocks, which prompted the lighthouse to be built. One hundred and twenty-eight persons, of 209 aboard, lost their lives when the ship sank.

The lighthouse was constructed by contractor James McMahon who hired sailors from San Francisco after his original crew refused to work in the dangerous conditions. Mile Rocks Lighthouse was finished in 1906 after considerable difficulty caused by the heavy seas and strong currents near the site.

The rock upon which the lighthouse is built measures only 40 by 30 feet (12.2 by 9.1 m) at high water. The base of the tower is a large block of concrete protected by steel plating. Steel and concrete in the foundation weigh 1500 tons. The superstructure is made of steel and houses the fog signal apparatus and the quarters for the former keepers.

In 1966, the light was automated and the tower was removed, leaving only the foundation and first story. The top of the first story was modified to support a helipad for the US Coast Guard. The original third order Fresnel lens was transferred to the Old Point Loma Lighthouse in San Diego.

== Gallery ==
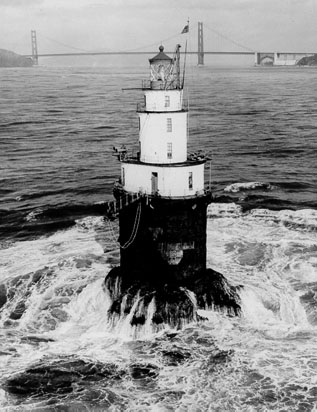
Mile Rocks Lighthouse in 1962, showing the original configuration.

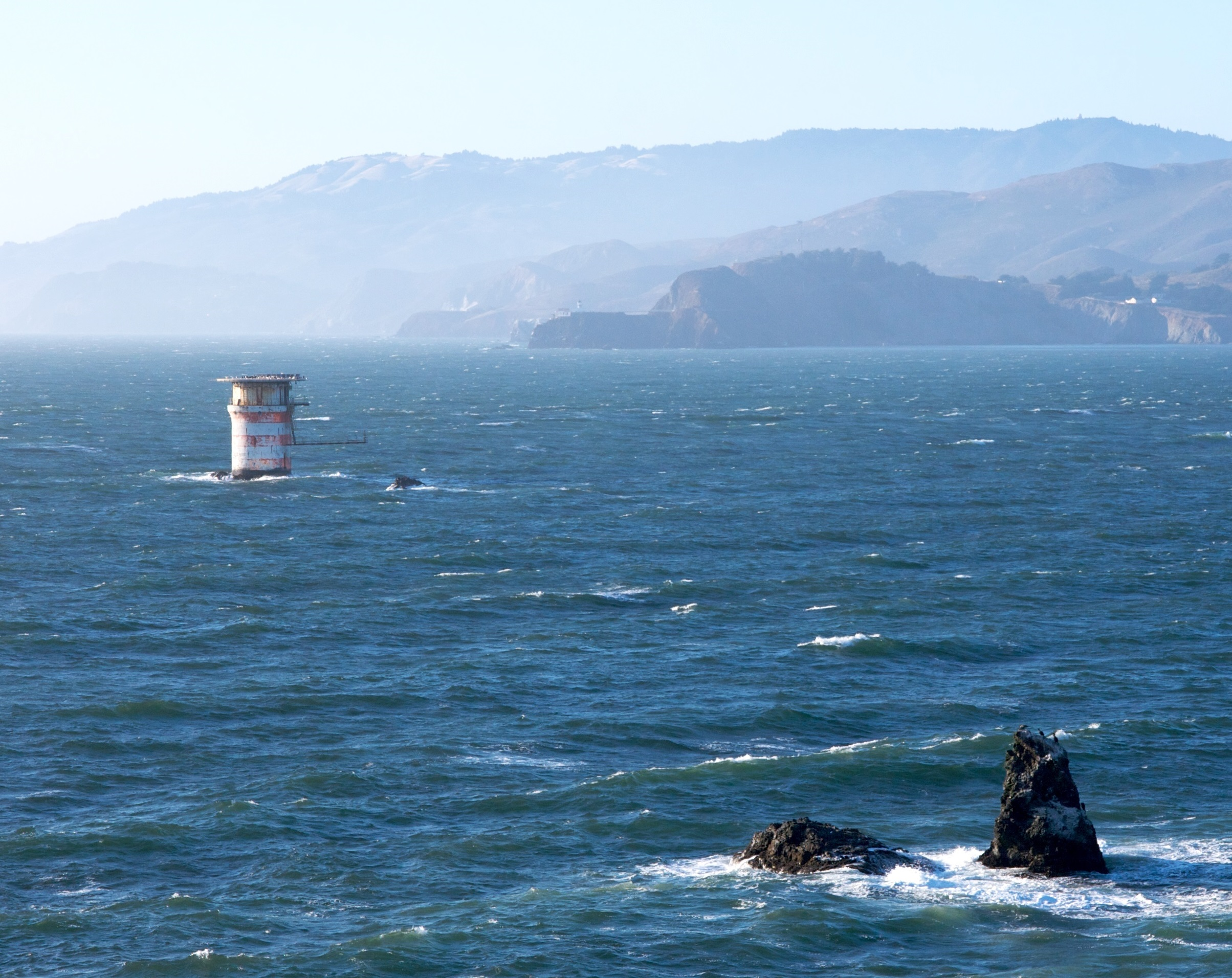
Mile Rocks lighthouse, with Point Bonita and Marin headlands in distance

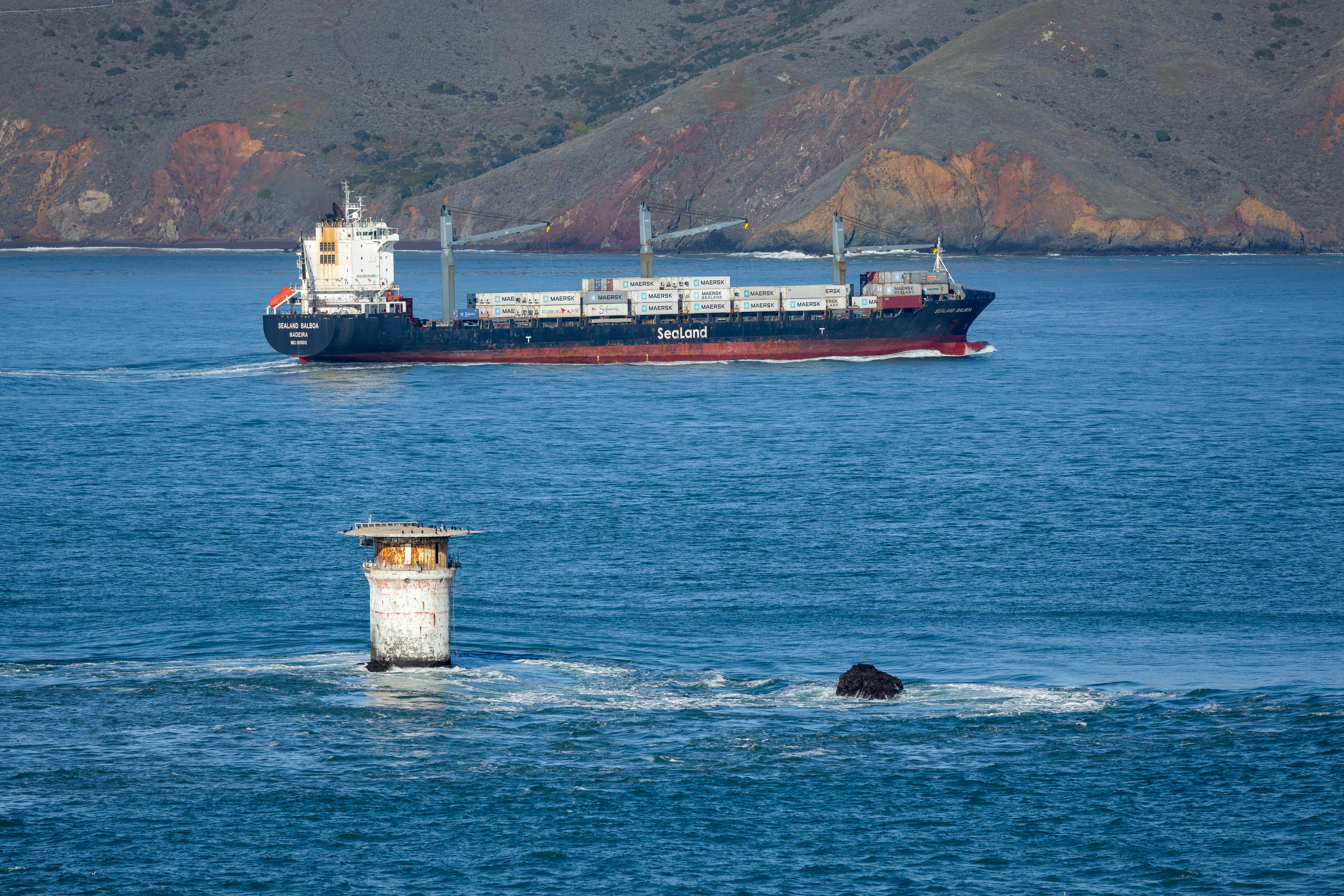
Mile Rocks Light with Container ship Sealand Balboa in December 2019

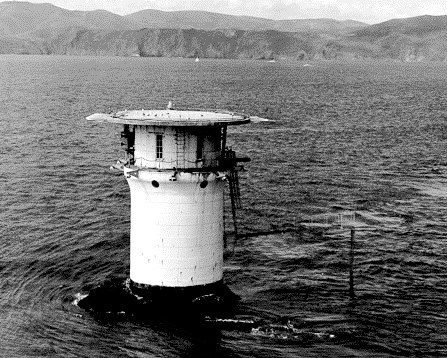
The lighthouse after modifications

== See also ==
- List of lighthouses in the United States
