= Consulate General of the United States, Shanghai =

United States diplomatic mission in China

Consulate General of the United States of America Shanghai
- 美国驻上海总领事馆
- Seal of the United States Consulate General in Shanghai

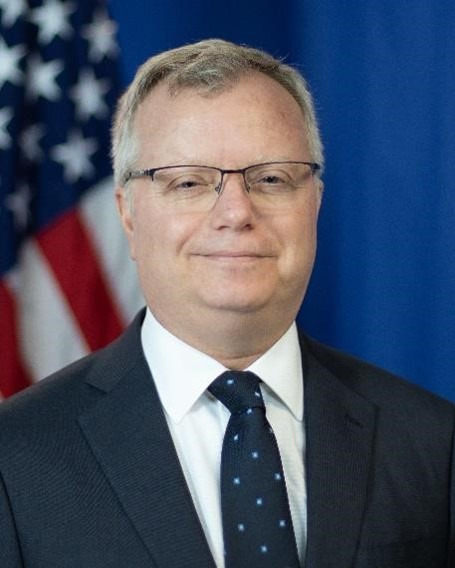
- Incumbent; Scott Walker since August 2023
- Formation: 1844 (to Qing Dynasty); 1980 (to PRC)
- Abolished: 1950-1980
- Website: china.usembassy-china.org.cn/embassy-consulates/shanghai/

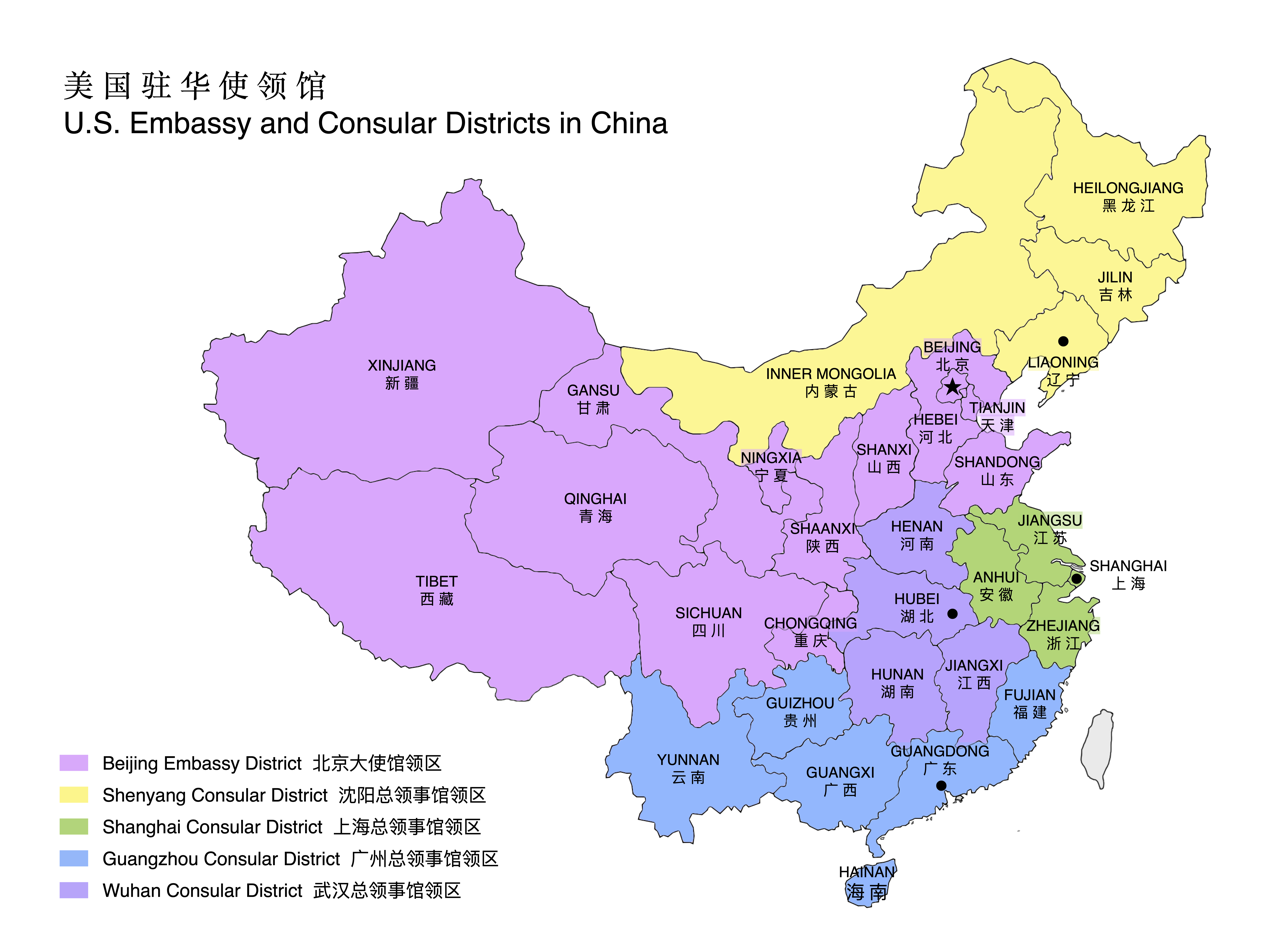
Area in green colour denotes the consular district of Consulate General Shanghai

The Consulate General of the United States in Shanghai is one of the five American diplomatic and consular posts in the People's Republic of China.

First established in 1844 following the signing of the Treaty of Wanghia, the U.S. Consulate General in Shanghai had a presence until the conclusion of the Chinese Communist Revolution and it closed in 1950. It reopened in 1980 at its present location at 1469 Huai Hai Zhong Road (at the corner with Urumqi Road) in an early 20th-century mansion.

The Consulate General has two other offices in Shanghai. The Consular Section (American Citizen Services Unit & Nonimmigrant Visa Unit) is located in the Westgate Mall and the Public Affairs Section is located in the Shanghai Centre both on Nanjing West Road.

== History ==
The history of the U.S. Consulate General in Shanghai dates from the earliest days of diplomatic relations between the United States and China. The Consulate General is among the oldest American diplomatic and consular posts in the Far East, and the second oldest in China.

=== Establishment ===
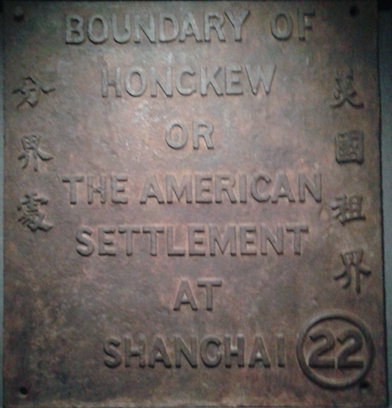
Boundary Stone of the American Settlement in Shanghai.

The first American consular presence in Shanghai dates to the mid-nineteenth century, following the conclusion of the Treaty of Wanghia, a treaty of "peace, amity, and commerce", between the United States and the Qing Dynasty in 1844. In the absence of an officially appointed consul, American businessman Henry Wolcott — local agent for a Boston trading company — raised the Stars and Stripes above his company office near the Bund and became the first Acting U.S. Consul in Shanghai.

In 1854, in recognition of growing American trade and interests in the port city, the United States Government appointed Robert Murphy the first professional American Consul in Shanghai. His offices were located on Whangpoo Road (now Huangpu Road), north of Suzhou Creek, in the area that would soon become the hub of Shanghai's American Settlement. As Shanghai's linkages with the West grew, so too did the American Consulate.

=== Growth in the 19th century ===
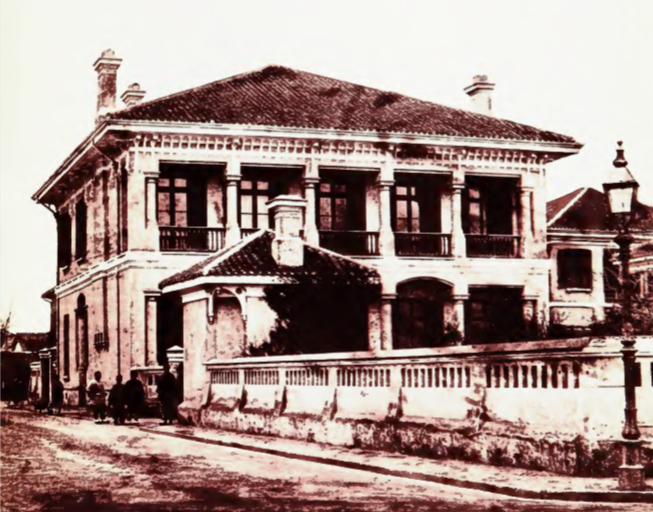
US Consulate General, Shanghai, 1880

President Abraham Lincoln named George Seward to be Consul in 1861 and promoted him to Consul General two years later. He served in that position until 1876 when he was appointed US Minister to China. During his fifteen years in Shanghai, Seward oversaw the expansion of the American Settlement and its merger with the British Settlement and French Concession, creating a joint International Settlement. (The French left the International Settlement soon after.)

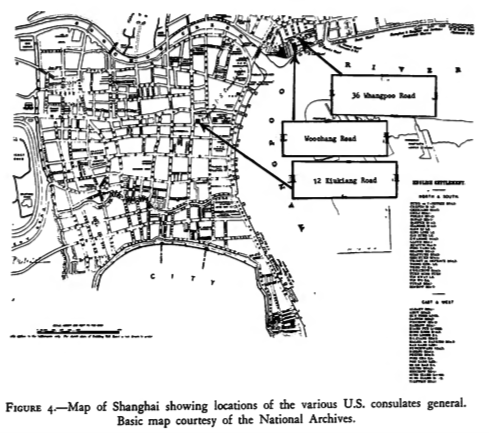
Map showing locations of US Consulates in Shanghai to 1910.

In 1874, Seward signed a lease for a consular compound to be built with its main entrance off Woochang Road (now Wuchang Road) and on the banks of the Huangpu River. In 1885, the land was sold and the new owners terminated the lease with effect from 1 February 1889. The consulate moved to new buildings at 12 Kiukiang Road (Jiujiang Road) in what was traditionally considered the British Concession.

=== Early twentieth century ===
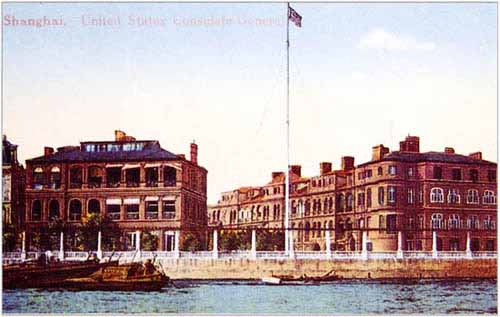
The United States Consulate in 1916

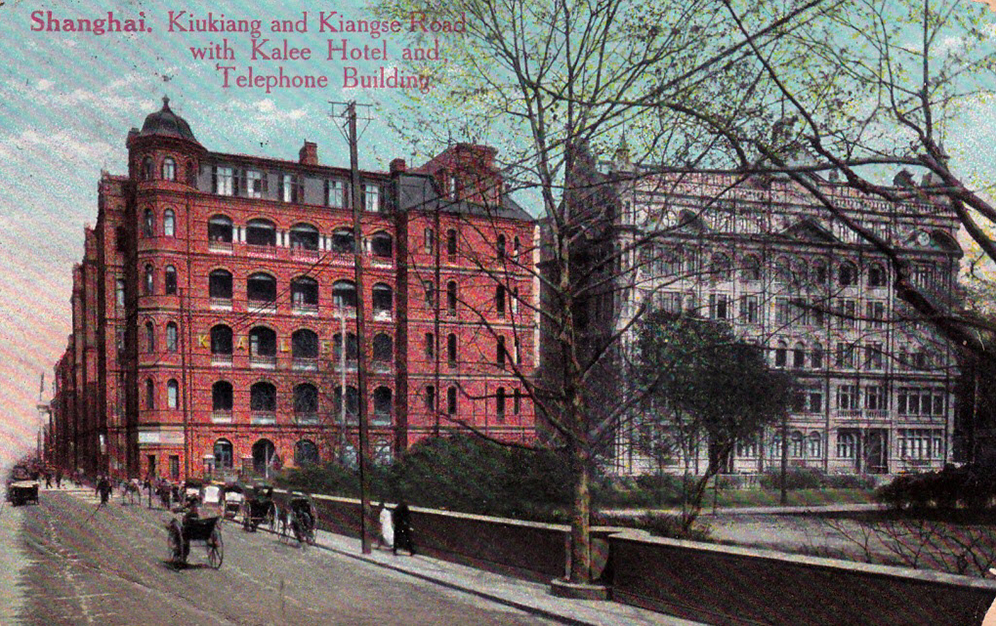
Kalee Hotel, the home of the consulate from 1930 to 1936

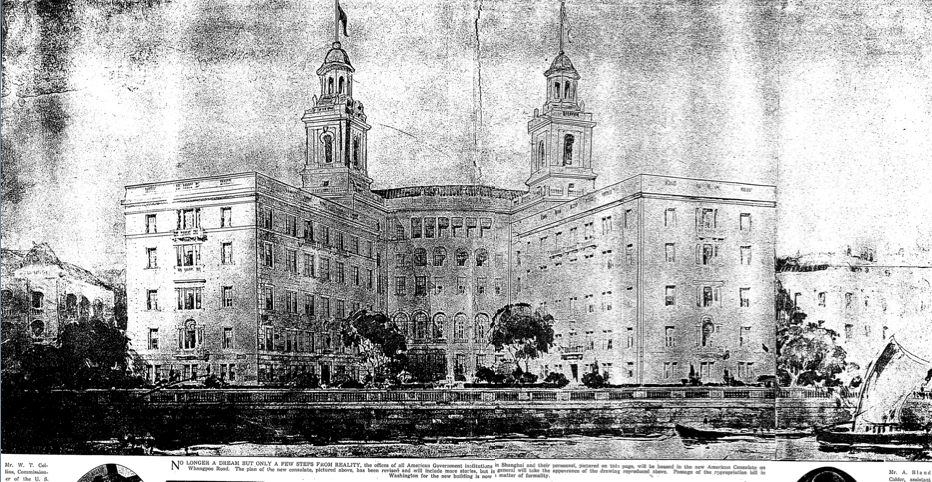
Plan for the New US Consulate General Shanghai, 1935

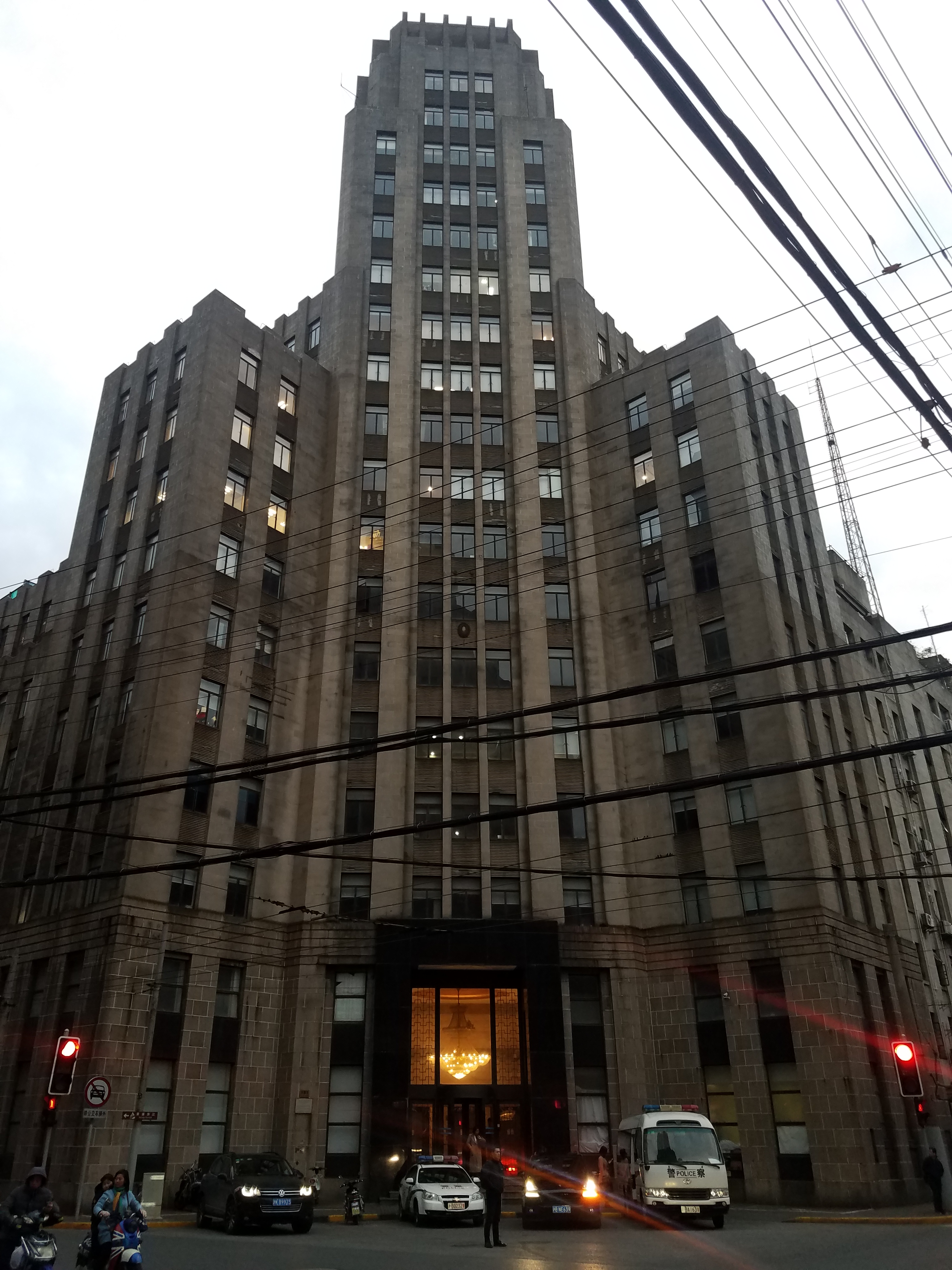
The Development Building on Fuzhou Road. The consulate was located on multiple floors in this building from 1936 to 1941

In 1901, the consulate returned to Hongkew, when Consul General John Goodnow agreed a ten-year lease to take over the old Club de Recrio building at 36 Whangpoo Road on a block away from the previous premises leased by Seward.

By the early twentieth century, more than 1,500 Americans called Shanghai home. The American community contributed to the economy and life of the city, founding businesses, hospitals, schools, and educational exchanges.

In 1911 a lease was signed for the Consulate General to move to six buildings in the Clifton Estate at 13-19 Whangpoo Road to accommodate a quickly growing staff and range of responsibilities. These buildings were occupied by the consulate, prison, post office, and two residences (at nos. 13 and 19). The United States Court for China was located across the private road in No. 11. In 1916, Mr Edward Isaac Ezra purchased the buildings with the intent of developing them. The US Consul General, Thomas Sammons contacted Mr Ezra who agreed to sell the premises to the US Government for the same price he had paid for them. These new offices — at a cost of $355,000 (425,000 taels) — were the most expensive U.S. embassy or consulate in the world at that time. The area was 6.258 mow (4172 square metres) and had a 275-foot (25 metres) water frontage.

The area came to be known as consular row with - starting from Garden Bridge - the Russian, German, American and Japanese consulates all located in a row at the confluence of Suzhou Creek and the Huangpu River.

In the 1930s, after substantial lobbying, it was decided to re-build the Consulate General. In 1930, the U.S. Consulate General moved south of Suzhou Creek, leaving the old American Settlement for the first time in nearly 30 years. The consulate was first located in the old Kalee Hotel at 248-250 Kiangse Road (now Jiangxi Road). The government offices were located on the Ground Floor and the Consulate and United States Court for China on the first floor. The upper floors were used as accommodation for consular staff. The US Marshal also built the consular jail in as part of the new premises.

The old Whangpoo Road premises were demolished in 1931 and the original plan was that the consulate would be re-built within a year. However, in 1932, Congress withdrew the appropriations for 1933, leaving the consulate in the old Kalee Hotel building. Appropriations were obtained in 1935 and grand plans for the new consulate announced. These never came to fruition. (The site and the site of the former German Consulate General next door that was demolished in 1937 is now the location of the Seagull Hotel which was built in the 1980s.)

In 1936, following a decision to raze the old Kalee Hotel, the consulate moved to the newly completed Development Building on the southwest corner of Kiangse Road and Foochow Road (now Fuzhou Road). The 4th and 5th Floor were occupied by the consulate, the 6th Floor, by the United States Court for China and the United States Treasury attache, with the 7th Floor having 3 suites for consular officers. Other consular officers moved to residential premises in the rest of Shanghai.

By the 1930s, the Consulate General hosted a staff of ten State Department officials, a trade commissioner from the Department of Commerce, and an agent from the Department of Agriculture, as well as the United States Court for China, a jail, wharf, post office, and a parade ground for visiting Navy and Marine detachments.

=== World War II ===
On December 8, 1941, the United States Consulate was occupied by the Japanese military at the beginning of the Pacific War. The US Consul, Edward Stanton, reported to the State Department:

"I have received a formal communication today (Dec 8) from the Japanese Consul General reading as follows: 'I have the honour to inform you that I have been instructed by His Imperial Japanese Majesty's Government to request you that the function of the American Consulate General at Shanghai will be here forth suspended and that the office of the American Consulate General be closed as from today. All the officers of the American Consulate General will be treated in accordance with international law and the principle of reciprocity.'"

The Consul and other staff were interned either at home or in the Metropole Hotel across the road from the consulate for 6 months before being repatriated via Maputo, Mozambique.

On March 7, 1942, the premises were handed over to the Swiss Consul-General in Shanghai, Emile Fontanel. The Japanese authorities requested the premises be handed over for other uses. Having received permission from the State Department, the 6th and 7th Floors were vacated and all archives and property moved to the 4th and 5th Floors. These floors were subsequently given up and the archives and property moved to other premises. The records were returned at the end of the war.

=== From World War II to Cold War ===
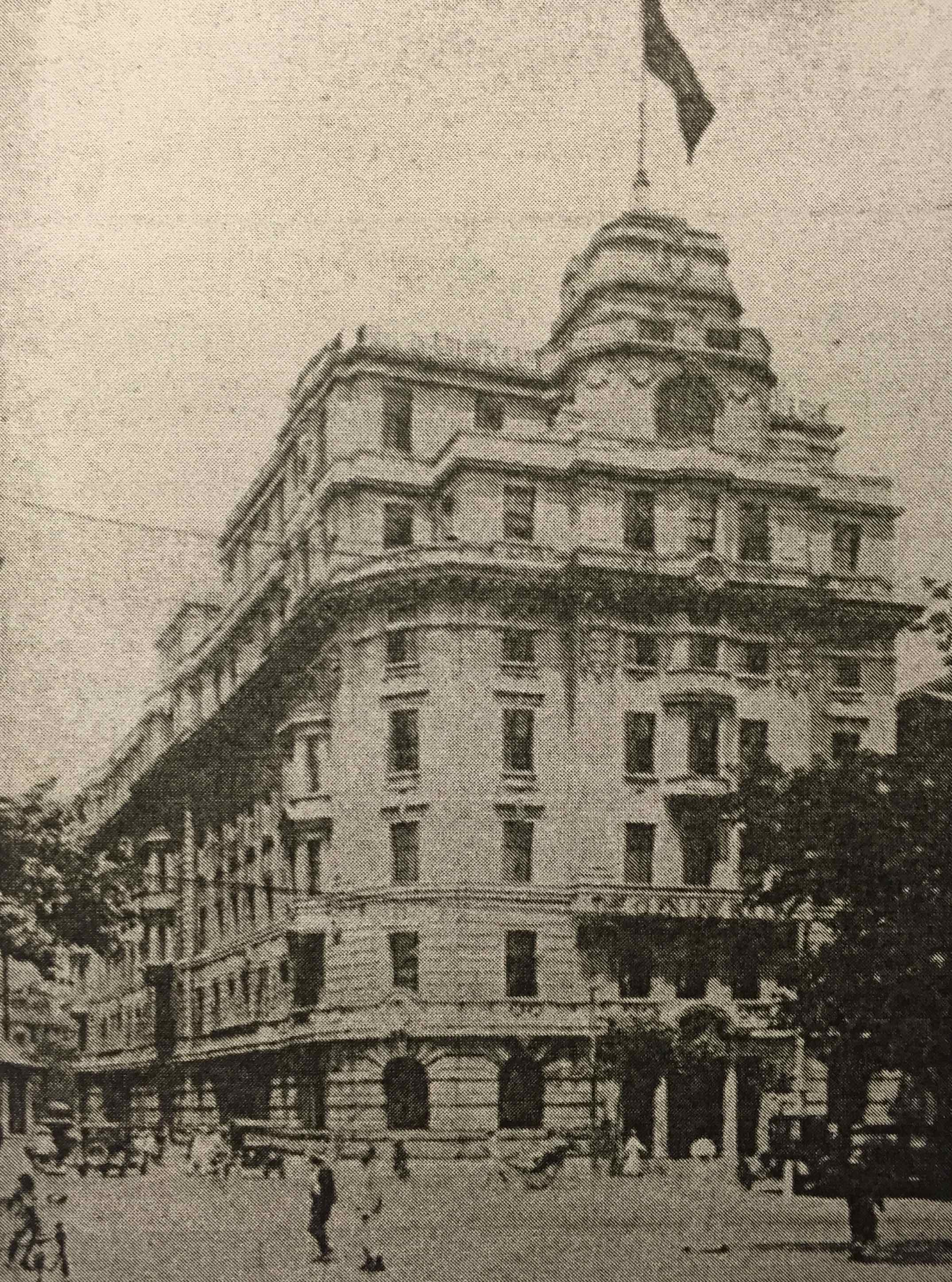
The Glen Line Building at the Corner of Peking Road and the Bund, Shanghai, home of the consulate from 1945 to 1950

On September 5, 1945, less than a month after Japan's surrender, the U.S. Consulate General resumed operations in the old Glen Line Building at 28 The Bund.

On May 29, 1949, the People's Liberation Army entered Shanghai. The new Communist government did not recognize the diplomatic status of the consulate staff, and on April 25, 1950, Consul General Walter McConaughy lowered the American flag and closed the consulate.

=== Rebirth and renewal ===
With the signing of the Joint Communiqué on the Establishment of Diplomatic Relations, the United States established normal diplomatic relations with China and on April 28, 1980 (almost exactly 30 years after it closed) the United States Consulate General in Shanghai reopened at its present location at 1469 Central Huaihai Road (at the corner of Urumqi Road).

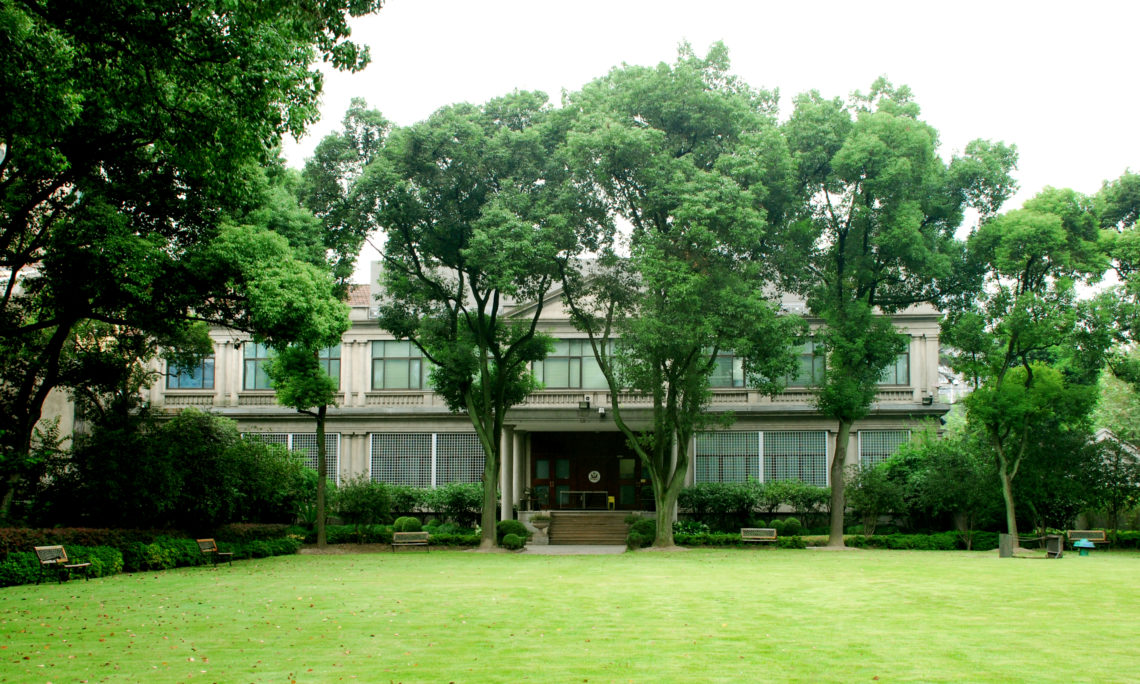
Main building of the current US Consulate in Shanghai

The current Consulate property was built in 1921. The main house is a villa in the French Renaissance style. Prior to the Consulate assuming the lease, the property hosted numerous and varied occupants. The first was Jardine, Matheson and Co., the largest British trading firm in Asia at the time. During World War II, a Japanese businessman and his family, and later the Swiss Consul General, took up residence in the house. In 1946, Rong Hongyuan (Yung Hungyuen), scion of a wealthy textile family, bought the property, but fled Shanghai soon after. Following the establishment of the People's Republic of China, the house was used by the All-China Women's Federation, was a center for "political education" during The Cultural Revolution, and finally served as a government guesthouse prior to the U.S. Consulate taking the lease. The present Consulate property sits on three acres, and includes several outbuildings, an orange grove, a Chinese rock garden, and a carp pond. Extensive renovations, both to the interior and exterior of the building, were carried out in 1997 and 2003–2005.

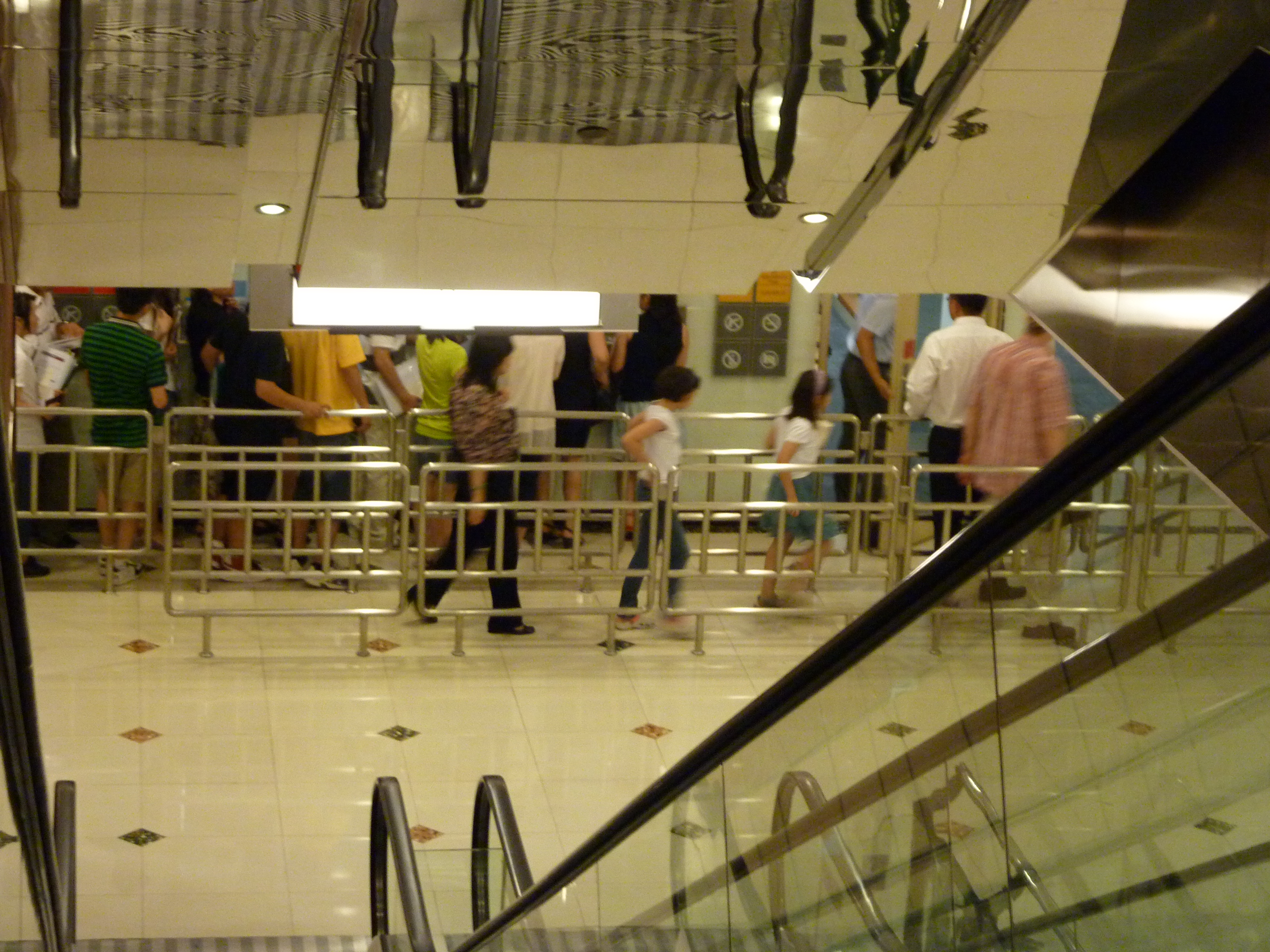
People queueing to access American Citizen services and the US Visa Section at Westgate Mall

On April 17, 2003, the consular section of the Consulate moved to the Westgate Mall on West Nanjing Road. All visa interviews and American citizen services were processed there.

== Consuls General ==
=== Post-1980 ===
- Scott C. Walker, 2023–Current
- James Heller, 2020–
- Sean B. Stein, 2017–2020
- M. Hanscom Smith, 2014–2017
- Robert Griffiths, 2011–2014
- Beatrice Camp, 2008–2011
- Ken Jarrett, 2005–2008
- Doug Spelman, 2002–2005
- Henry (Hank) Levine, 1999–2002
- Ray Burghardt, 1997–1999
- Joe Borich, 1994–1997
- Jerome Ogden, 1992–1994
- Pat Wardlaw, 1989–1992
- Charles Sylvester, 1987–1989
- Thomas (Stan) Brooks, 1983–1987
- Don Anderson, 1980–1983

=== Pre-1950 ===
==== Consuls General ====
- Walter P. McConaughy, 1949–1950
- John M. Cabot, 1948–1949
- Monnett B. Davis, 1946–1947
- Frank P. Lockhart, 1940–1942
- Clarence E. Gauss, 1936–1940 (Later appointed Ambassador to China)
- Monnett B. Davis, 1935–1936
- Edwin S. Cunningham, 1920–1935
- Thomas N. Sammons, 1914–1919
- Amos Parker Wilder, 1909–1914
- Charles Denby Jr., 1907–1909
- James Linn Rodgers, 1905–1907
- John Goodnow, 1897–1905
- Thomas R. Jernigan, 1894–1897
- Alfred Daniel Jones, 1893–1893 (Died in office)
- Joseph A. Leonard, 1889–1893
- General John Doby Kennedy, 1886–1889
- Enoch J. Smithers, 1885–86
- General Julius H. Stahel, 1884–85
- Owen N. Denny 1880–1883
- David H. Bailey, 1879–1880
- G. Wiley Wells, 1877–1879
- John C. Myers 1876–1877
- George F. Seward, 1863–76 (Promoted to Minister to China)

==== Consuls ====
- George F. Seward, 1862–1862
- William L.G. Smith, 1858–1862
- George B. Glover, 1858–1858
- Robert C. Murphy
- John N. A. Griswold, 1848–1851
- Henry G. Wolcott, 1845–1848

== See also ==
- List of diplomatic missions of the United States
- U.S. Embassy, Beijing
- U.S. Consulate General, Chengdu
- U.S. Consulate General, Guangzhou
- U.S. Consulate General, Shenyang
- U.S. Consulate General, Wuhan
- Americans in China
