= Edward Isaac Ezra =

Chinese businessman (1883-1921)

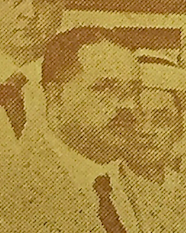
- Born: 3 January 1883; Shanghai, China
- Died: 15 December 1921 (aged 38); Baikal Road Jewish Cemetery
- Occupations: Businessman philanthropist

Edward Isaac Ezra (3 January 1883 – 15 December 1921) was a wealthy Jewish businessman, who was the first member of the Shanghai Municipal Council who was actually born in China, and who was at one time "one of the wealthiest foreigners in Shanghai". According to one report, Ezra amassed a vast fortune estimated at from twenty to thirty million dollars primarily through the importation of opium, and successful real estate investment and management in early twentieth century Shanghai. Ezra was the largest stockholder and the managing director of Shanghai Hotels Ltd., and its major financier, and controlled such hotels as the Astor House Hotel in Shanghai.

== Family background ==
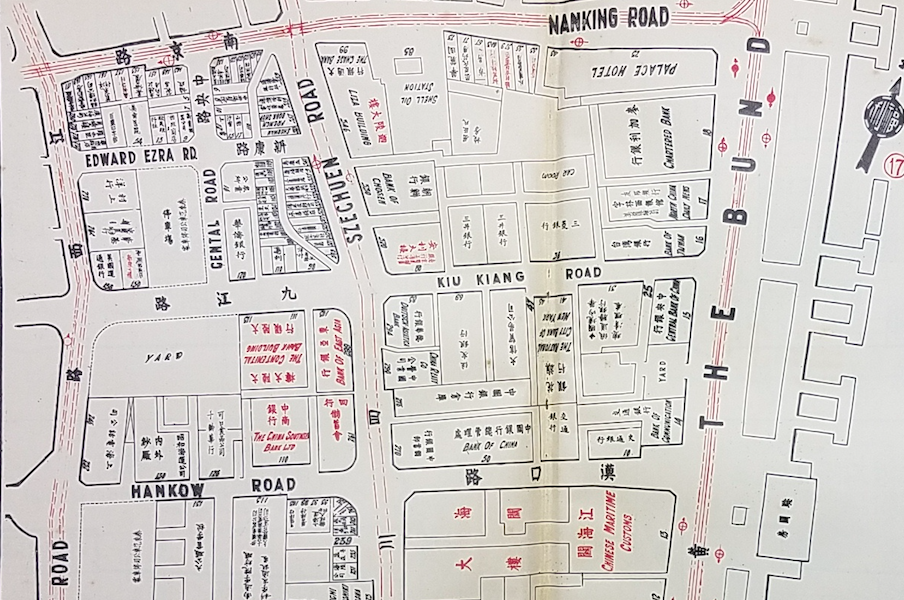
Map showing location of Edward Ezra Road

Edward Isaac Ezra was born in Shanghai, China on 3 January 1883, the oldest of the nine children of Isaac "Ned" Ezra (died 1892), one of the first Jewish merchants in Shanghai. Ezra Road (now Shashi No.2 Road 沙市二路 – between Nanjing East Road and Jiujiang Road) was named after his father and his mother, Flora Abraham (died 1899). He was the older brother of Rachel Ezra Levy (born 1884 in Shanghai; married Nissim Simon Levy; died 2 January 1968 in Hong Kong); Ellis Isaac Ezra (born ca. 1885); and twins Isaac Isaac Ezra (born 8 February 1892) and Judah Isaac Ezra (born 8 February 1892); and four other sisters. In 1907 Ezra married Mozelle Robinson Sopher (born 1890 in Shanghai; died August 1979 in Hong Kong), and they had two children, Cecil (born 1908) and Denzil (born 1914).

== Business activities ==
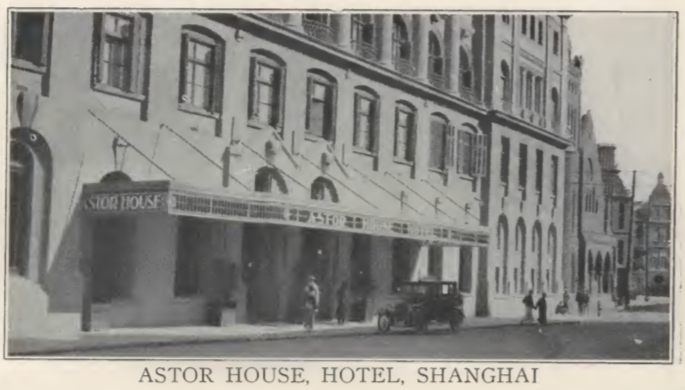
Astor House Hotel, owned by Ezra

In 1896 The Central Stores Company, which was largely financed by Ezra, took over the Central Hotel (later the Peace Hotel) on the southern corner of Nanjing Road and the Bund. From 1900 Ezra had diversified his economic activities, adding large-scale real estate investments, construction, and management. Ezra was considered one of Shanghai's major landowners. Ezra "erected – on the land bounded by Nanking, Kiujiang, Szechwan and Kiangse Roads – 1,000,000 taels worth of residences that enjoyed modern amenities. The family interests included hotels," including the Astor House Hotel.

Ezra was the managing director of Shanghai Hotels Limited from 1907, chairman of the Far Eastern Insurance Company, chairman of the Shanghai Gas Company, chairman of the China Motors Ltd. Additionally, he held large proprietary interests in, and was president and chairman of, the China Press and the Evening Star newspapers.

In 1913 Ezra was elected the first president of the Shanghai Opium Combine. At the same time Ezra was leading the legal cartel, he was also organising an illegal underground opium smuggling and distribution network, involving his younger brothers, twins Isaac Isaac Ezra and Judah Isaac Ezra, and some Chinese associates. When it was exposed, Ezra was granted immunity from prosecution by testifying against Paul Yip, his Chinese partner, who received an 18-month prison sentence.

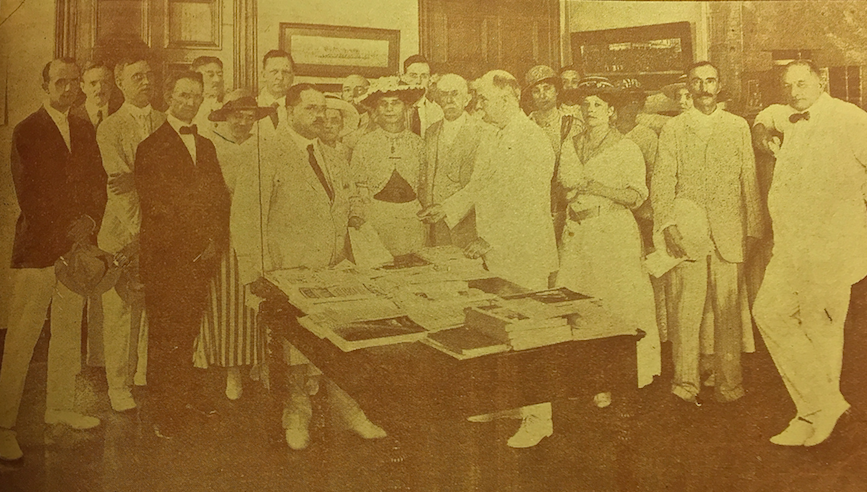
American Consul General Thomas Sammons handing a check to Mr Ezra in 1916 in payment for the site of the US Consulate.

By 1915 Ezra had generated enough wealth to be able to re-sell at the price he had paid for it a choice property in the most desirable part of the Hongkou District on the northern bank of the Suzhou Creek diagonally across Huangpu Road from the Astor House Hotel, to the United States for their consulate. By 1920 the Astor House Hotel was making a handsome profit under his leadership.

In 1917 Ezra purchased The China Press newspaper from its founder, American journalist Thomas Franklin Fairfax Millard.

== Social activities ==
Ezra's relationship to the Sassoon family by marriage, as well as his immense wealth, allowed him both social standing and political position. His own home on Joffre Road (now 1209 Huaihai Lu) in the Shanghai French Concession was an indicator of his wealth. According to Paul French, "Ezra was extremely rich and lived in considerable style in the Ezra mansion" with "Louis XV furniture throughout, a ballroom for 150 dancers, a music room to seat an audience of 80 in comfort, and elegantly designed French windows giving out on to 25 acres (10 ha) of gardens."

In 1900, Ezra, also a philanthropist, helped organise and fund the Society for the Rescue of the Chinese Jews, which aimed at restoring Kaifeng Jews to orthodox Judaism. Ezra was the president of the Shanghai Zionist Association from its founding in 1903. Ezra was the vice-president of the Jewish Communal organisation of China, and vice-president of the Synagogue.

Ezra was an active member and past Master of the Lodge Saltoun in East-Asia, and made his way up to the highest degrees in freemasonry. Ezra was a member of the Shanghai Club; the Shanghai Race Club; the Masonic Club; and the Cercle Sportif Francais.

From 1912 to 1918, Ezra was one of the nine-member Shanghai Municipal Council that administered the Shanghai International Settlement. Despite an obvious conflict of interest in relation to his opium business, Ezra refused to resign from the Council. In 1919 Ezra resigned from public life because of a gambling scandal involving his brother, Judah, who had paid the favourite team to lose in a baseball tournament in 1918.

== Death ==
Ezra died of a cerebral hemorrhage at the Shanghai Nursing Home after collapsing in his office at Kiukiang Road about noon on Thursday, 15 December 1921, aged only 38, in abject poverty and isolation, abandoned by his former colleagues. Ezra was buried at the Baikal Road Jewish Cemetery in the Yangpu District after a service conducted by Rabbi Hirsch.

Ezra's premature death accelerated the decline of the family's prestige and wealth. According to Douglas Valentine, "Left to their own devices, the degenerate Ezra brothers squandered the family fortune and by the mid-1920s had decided to trafficking in illicit drugs." After 1925 Judah and Isaac both moved to San Francisco, where they were among the first to import narcotics from Asia to the United States. The Ezra brothers formed a connection with Italian Mafiosi Antone "Black Tony" Parmiagni, Charles "Lucky" Luciano and Frank Costello, Jewish gangster Meyer Lansky, and with Ye Ching Ho (Pinyin: Ye Qinghe), also known as Paul Yip (or Paul Yi), an agent of Chiang Kai-shek's Kuomintang and with the approval of Chiang's Nationalist government, "which relied on opium profits for its survival". In May 1933 the Ezra brothers were arrested in California for distributing narcotics on the West Coast of the United States. Despite their guilty pleas and co-operation with authorities in testifying against their confederates, they were fined $12,000 each and were imprisoned for twelve years, thus "bringing their family's fortunes to an abrupt and dramatic conclusion." After their release from prison, the Ezra brothers were deported.
