= Taipei Film House =

Coordinates: 25°03′11″N 121°31′20″E

Former United States Ambassador's Residence in Taipei Taipei Film House
- 臺北之家
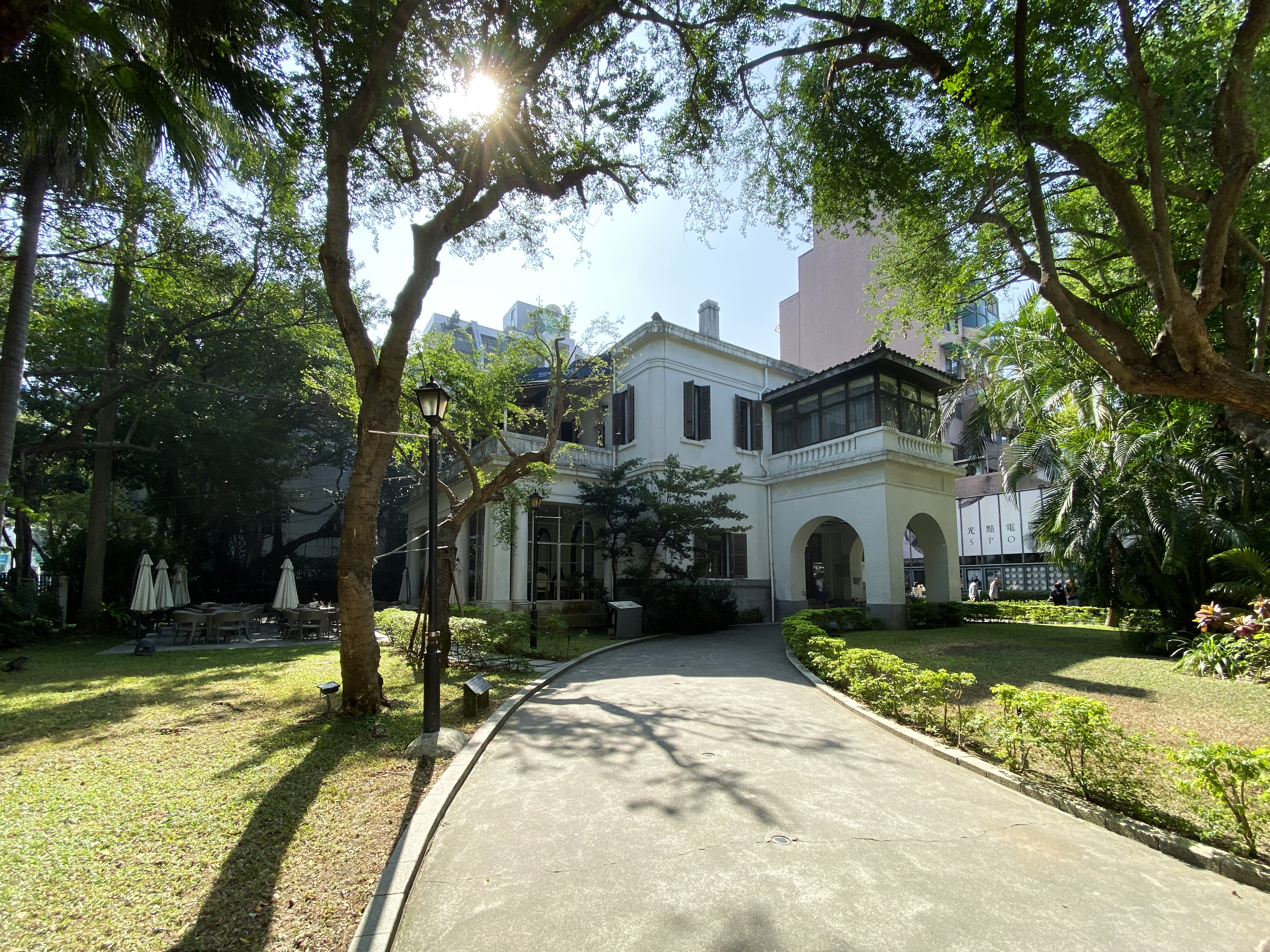
- Interactive map of the Former United States Ambassador's Residence in Taipei Taipei Film House area

General information
- Type: Former Ambassador's Residence; Movie theater
- Location: Zhongshan, Taipei, Taiwan
- Completed: 8 December 1926
- Opening: 10 November 2002

Technical details
- Floor count: 2
- Floor area: 375 square feet (34.8 m^{2})

Design and construction
- Main contractor: Taiwan Real Estate Co., Ltd.

Website
- www.spot.org.tw

The Former United States Ambassador's Residence, Taipei (Chinese: 前美國大使官邸) is a former official residence of the United States Ambassador in Zhongshan District, Taipei, Taiwan. The building currently houses the Taipei Film House (Chinese: 臺北之家) also called SPOT-Taipei (Chinese: 光點臺北; pinyin: Guāngdiǎn Táiběi) as a movie theater.

== History ==
=== Empire of Japan ===
At the end of the 19th century, flourishing commerce in tea and camphor led many Western foreign countries such as the United States, the Netherlands, and Britain to establish consulates and trade offices in the Dadaocheng district of Taihoku Prefecture. The United States built its consulate at this location during the Japanese rule in 1926 as the American Consulate in Taihoku.

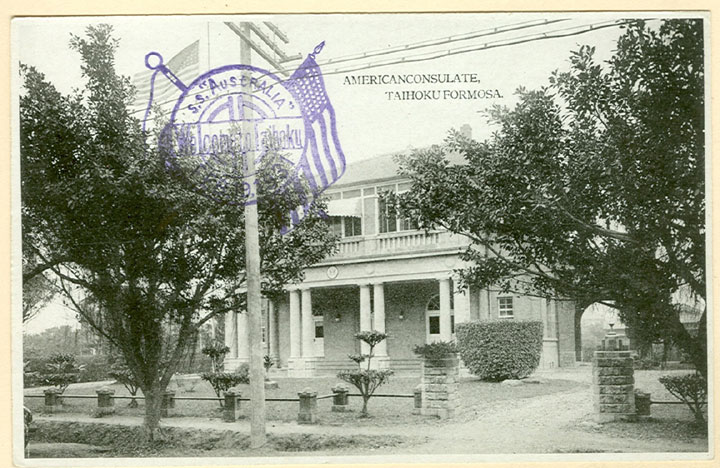
The Consulate seen during the Japanese rule of Formosa

In 1913, seeing that Formosa's strategic position was gradually becoming more important, the U.S. government upgraded their offices in Formosa.

In 1941, World War II broke out between Japan and the United States in the Pacific, forcing the American consulate in Taihoku to close.

=== Republic of China ===
After the Japanese surrender ceremonies were conducted by the Republic of China on 25 October 1945, the United States established its consulate at the building on 4 April 1946. In 1948, it was upgraded to a consulate-general as the Consulate General of the United States, Taipei and handled American business in Taiwan at the present address in Taipei's Zhongshan District. The first appointee to be stationed as consul general at the consulate was Robert C. Strong.

In 1950, the Korean War broke out, the United States again started aiding the Republic of China. In addition, an ambassador was accredited to the Republic of China. In 1953, it was upgraded to an embassy status, succeeding the embassy in Nanjing. After that, it served as the US Ambassador's residence. Ambassadors Karl L. Rankin, Everett F. Drumright, Alan G. Kirk, Jerauld Wright, Walter P. McConaughy and Leonard S. Unger all made this building their home. It now stands as an historic witness to relations between Taipei and Washington, D.C.

In November 1953, when then-U.S. Vice President Richard Nixon visited Taiwan, he and his wife stayed at this ambassador's residence.

On 1 January 1979, the United States switched diplomatic relations from the Republic of China to the People's Republic of China and subsequently the American Institute in Taiwan was established on 16 January 1979 to maintain non-diplomatic relations with Taiwan. The US embassy in Taipei and this residence was closed on 28 February 1979 and the building was left abandoned.

On 20 February 1997, the building was listed as historic monument by the government of the Republic of China. In 2000, the Taipei City Government and Taiwan Semiconductor Manufacturing Company (TSMC) under the Cultural and Educational Foundation began renovating the building. The building now houses the Taipei Film House.

== Architecture ==
The building is a two-story mansion with white exterior wall with Victorian and American colonial style. The main hallway faces north with jutting veranda on its east side. The interior layout is designed around the central staircase.

== Transportation ==
The building is accessible within walking distance northeast of Zhongshan Station of Taipei Metro.

== See also ==
- American Institute in Taiwan
- Taiwan–United States relations
- Cinema of Taiwan
