= David H. Bailey =

David H. Bailey may refer to:

- David H. Bailey (mathematician) (David Harold Bailey, born 1948), American mathematician and computer scientist
- David Bailey (diplomat) (David Haworth Bailey, 1830–1896), US politician and consul to China
