= George Seward (diplomat) =

American diplomat

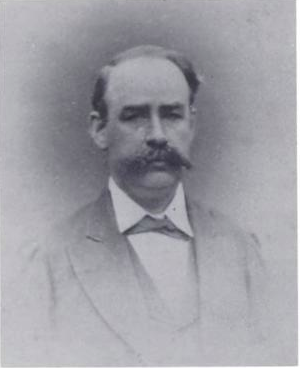

United States Minister to China
- In office 1876–1880
- Preceded by: Benjamin Parke Avery
- Succeeded by: James Burrill Angell

Consul General of the United States, Shanghai
- In office 1863–1876
- Preceded by: Office established
- Succeeded by: John C. Myers

Consul of the United States, Shanghai
- In office 1861–1863
- Preceded by: William L.G. Smith

Personal details
- Born: November 8, 1840 Florida, Orange County, New York
- Died: November 28, 1910 (aged 70) New York City, New York
- Resting place: Woodlawn Cemetery, The Bronx, New York
- Party: Republican
- Spouse: Kate Sherman (m. 1870-1910, his death)
- Children: 4
- Education: Union College (attended)
- Awards: Order of the Dannebrog Third Class (Denmark); Order of the Dragon of Annam (French Indochina)

George Frederick Seward (November 8, 1840 – November 28, 1910) was a United States diplomat in China during the mid and late 19th century. He served as "Envoy Extraordinary and Minister Plenipotentiary" to China from 1876 until 1880. He later was an insurance executive with the Fidelity and Casualty Company.

== Diplomatic career in China ==
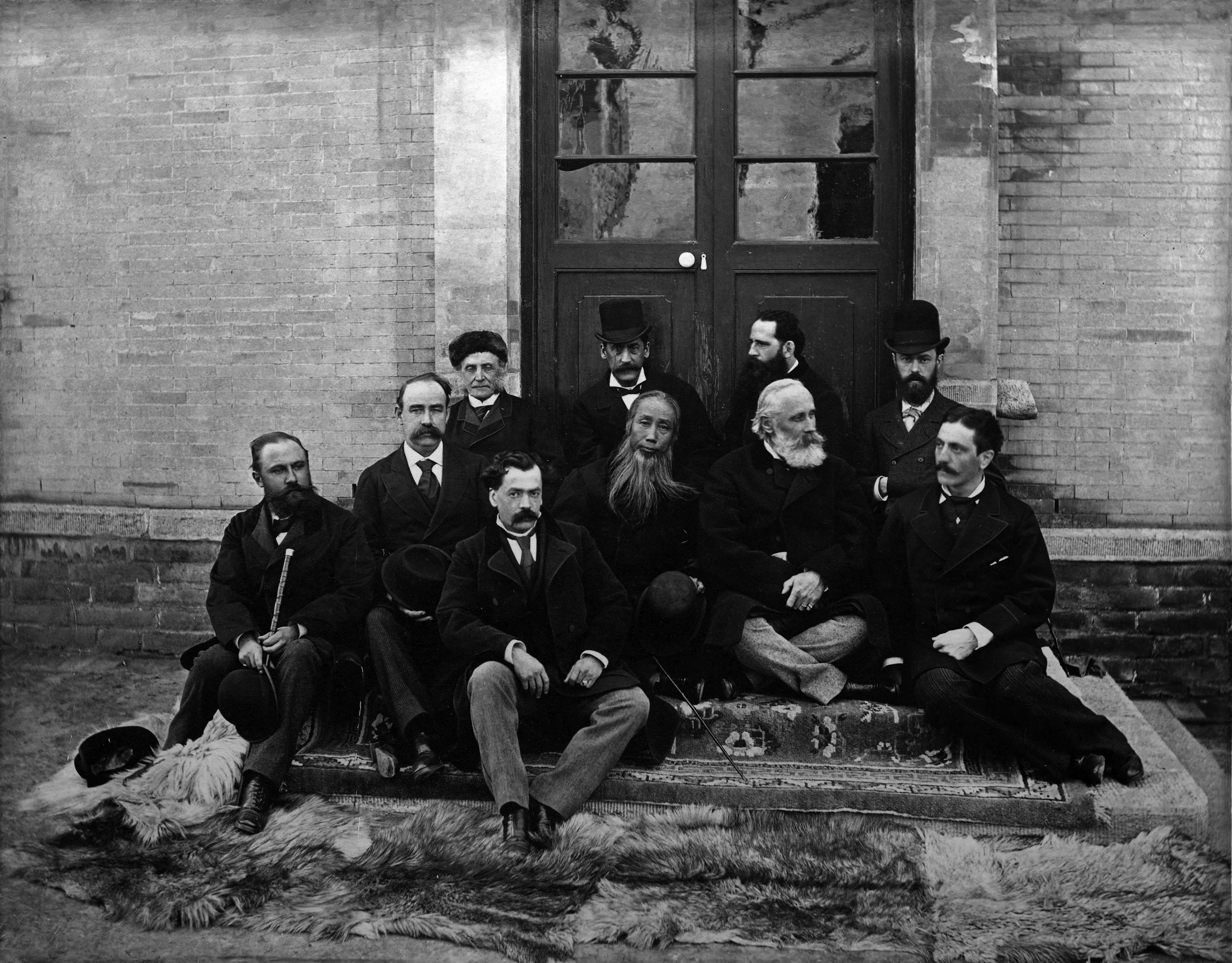
George Seward and ministers from other countries in China

Seward was a native of Florida, New York, and was educated at the S. S. Seward Institute. He attended Union College; he later served as a trustee of the school and was awarded the honorary degree of LL.D. In 1861, he was appointed to the position of U.S. Consul in Shanghai, an appointment secured through his uncle William H. Seward, who was serving as United States Secretary of State. He was appointed United States Consul General in Shanghai in 1863, and U.S. Minister to China on January 7, 1876.

During his service, Seward played a key role in early treaty negotiations that would eventually become known as the Chinese Exclusion Act. Seward opposed restricting Chinese immigration.

His successor at Shanghai, John C. Myers of Reading, Pennsylvania, had reported to State Department superiors that Seward and his vice-counsul Oliver Bradford had been engaging in private land and capital speculation in China that seemed to violate the noninterference provisions of the Burlingame Treaty of 1868. However, Myers had been suspended for his efforts, as had his successor Wiley Wells, ex-Congressman from Mississippi. Wells and Myers then sought redress from Congress, and a committee considered impeaching George Seward.

Meanwhile, the Hayes administration nominated John Singleton Mosby as consul at Hong Kong. Mosby's predecessor, David H. Bailey, had been nominated as Seward's successor in Shanghai and had traveled to Washington to defend his cronies. Upon arriving at his post, Mosby heard many reports about a network of embezzlement and shady speculation masterminded by Seward, and which also included Bailey and Loring in Hong Kong, missionary Chester Holcombe, David Sickels and Torrey in Bangkok and Adolph Studer in Singapore. Mosby's initial report to his immediate supervisor, Frederick W. Seward (George's cousin), mentioned only Bailey's improprieties, but received no reply and Bailey was confirmed. In March 1879, Mosby wrote to President Hayes' confidante, General Thomas C. H. Smith, about an embezzlement scheme operated by David B. Sickels (U.S. Consul at Bangkok) and his vice-counsel Torrey (a Hong Kong native whose correspondence with Loring whom Mosby had fired had accepted and read by Mosby). President Grant heard similar reports on his around-the-world cruise after his presidency ended, and encouraged Mosby to follow up, as well as spoke with President Hayes upon his return.

By October 1879, Frederick Seward had resigned under fire, and before the 1880 elections (which Republican James Garfield won), Secretary of State William M. Evarts cleaned house in the far East. George Seward was replaced as Minister to China during the summer of 1880.

== Later life ==
Seward became an executive with the Fidelity and Casualty Company; he was appointed vice president in 1887 and president in 1893. Seward served as the company's president until his death. His other business interests included service as president of the Virginia Electrolytic Company, and a director of the Virginia Laboratory Company and the Tin Products Company.

In addition to his business interests, Seward's civic and professional affiliations included member of the American Geographical Society, Academy of Political and Social Science and Institute of Civics, Municipal League for Civic Reform, Philippine Progress Commission, New Jersey Historical Society, and New York City's Author's Club, Reform Club, and Lawyer's Club. In addition, Seward was chairman of the executive committee for New York City's Chamber of Commerce.

== Awards ==
In addition to his LL.D. from Union College, Seward received the Order of the Dannebrog Third Class from the government of Denmark and the Order of the Dragon of Annam from the French colonial government of Indochina to recognize services he performed on behalf of each country during his consular service.

== Death and burial ==
Seward died in New York City on November 28, 1910. His funeral was held at Madison Square Presbyterian Church. He was buried at Woodlawn Cemetery in The Bronx.

== Family ==
In 1870, Seward married Kate Sherman of California. They were the parents of four children—George, Marian, Annie, and Emma.
