= Graves B. Erskine =

United States Marine Corps general

Graves Blanchard Erskine
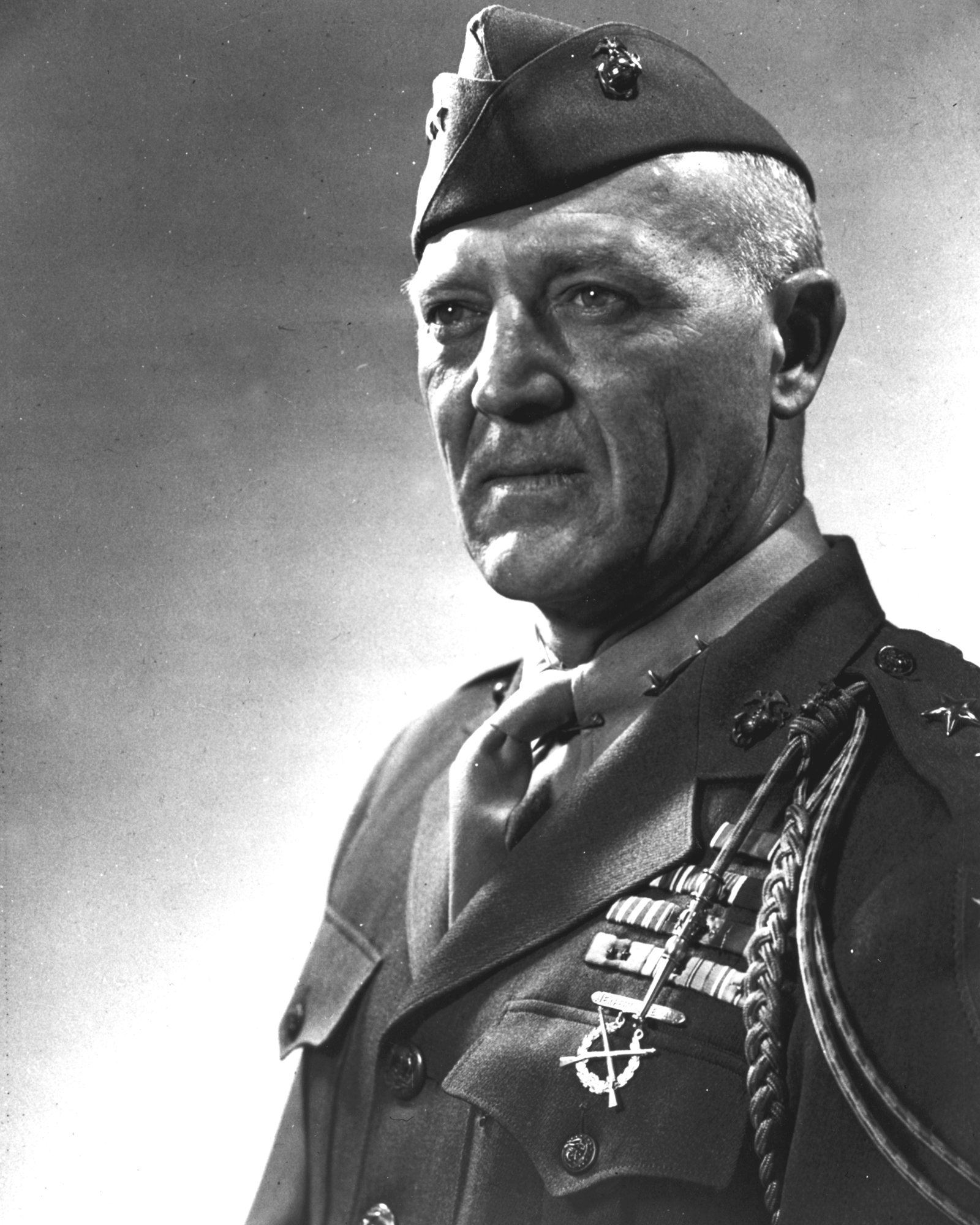
- Erskine c. 1945
- Born: June 28, 1897; Columbia, Louisiana, U.S.
- Died: May 21, 1973 (aged 75); Bethesda, Maryland, U.S.
- Burial place: Arlington National Cemetery
- Military career
- Allegiance: United States of America
- Branch: United States Marine Corps
- Service years: 1912–1916 (National Guard); 1917 – 1953 (USMC)
- Rank: General
- Commands: 3rd Marine Division; 1st Marine Division; Camp Pendleton; Fleet Marine Force, Atlantic
- Conflicts: World War I; German Spring Offensive; Battle of Château-Thierry; Battle of Belleau Wood; Battle of Soissons; Hundred Days Offensive; St. Mihiel Offensive; Banana Wars; Haiti intervention; Dominican intervention; Nicaraguan intervention; Chinese Civil War; World War II; Attack on Pearl Harbor; Aleutian Islands campaign; Gilbert and Marshall Islands campaign; Battle of Kwajalein; Marianas campaign; Battle of Saipan; Battle of Tinian; Volcano and Ryukyu Islands campaign; Battle of Iwo Jima; Korean War
- Awards: Navy Distinguished Service Medal; Silver Star Medal; Legion of Merit (2) w/ Combat "V"; Purple Heart Medal
- Other work: Director of Special Operations of the Department of Defense (1953–1961)

General Graves Blanchard Erskine (June 28, 1897 – May 21, 1973) was a United States Marine Corps officer who led the 3rd Marine Division during the Battle of Iwo Jima in World War II.

== Early life and education ==
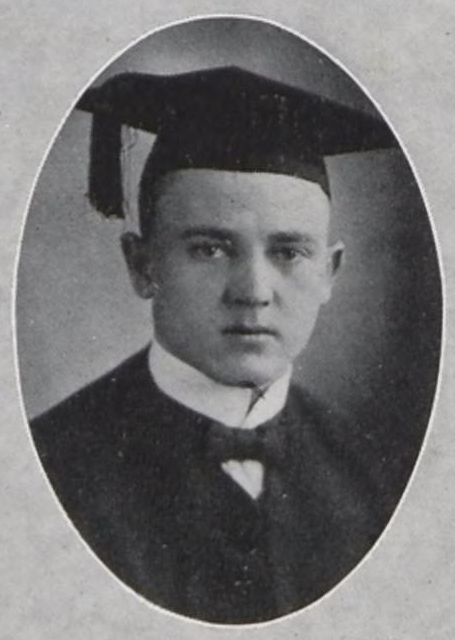
Erskine in the Louisiana State University yearbook, 1917

Erskine was born in Columbia, Louisiana, on June 28, 1897, where he graduated from high school at age 15 as class valedictorian. He entered Louisiana State University in the fall of 1912, and joined the Louisiana National Guard. In 1916, he saw duty on the Mexican border. He joined the U.S. Marine Corps Reserve, May 21, 1917; and graduated in June 1917, just a few weeks after the American entry into World War I.

== Career ==
Upon graduation, Erskine reported for active duty in the U.S. Marine Corps as a second lieutenant on July 5, 1917.

=== World War I ===
In January 1918, he sailed for France, and as a platoon leader in the 6th Marine Regiment, participated in the Aisne-Marne Defensive (Battle of Chateau-Thierry), where he was wounded in action; also fighting at Belleau Wood; Bouresches; and Soissons. In the St. Mihiel Offensive, he was so seriously wounded that he was evacuated to the United States in October 1918, spending a year in the hospital and undergoing nine surgeries.

For bravery in action, he was awarded the Silver Star Medal, was cited by General John J. Pershing, Commander-in-Chief (C-in-C) of the American Expeditionary Force (AEF), and in General Orders of the War Department, and entitled to wear the French Fourragère as a member of the 6th Marine Regiment.

=== Interwar period ===
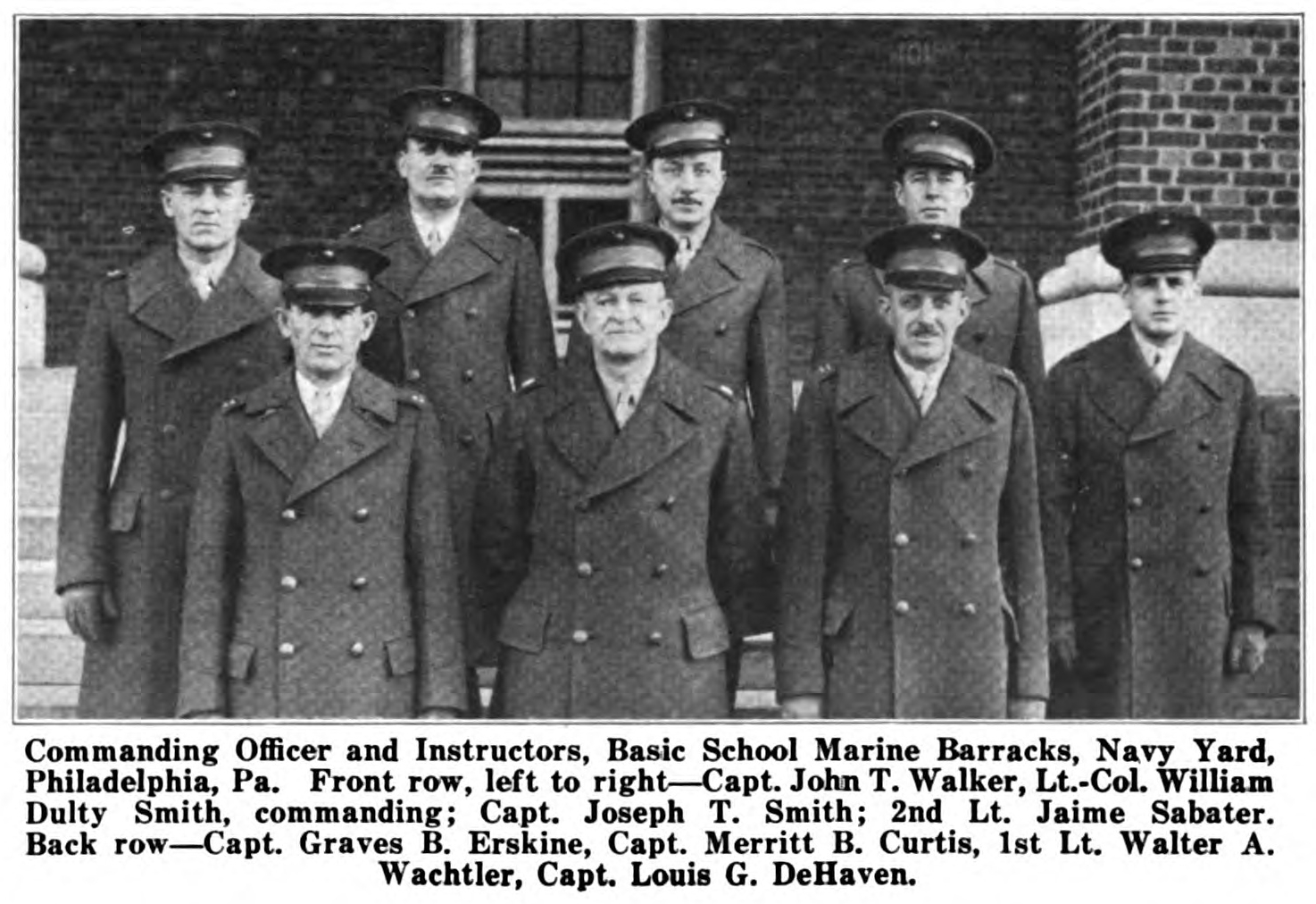
Erskine (back row, far left) in Leatherneck Magazine, May 1932

Following recruiting duty in Kansas City, Missouri, he was assigned foreign shore duty with the 1st Provisional Marine Brigade in Haiti; sea duty aboard the USS Olympia; and again foreign shore duty, with the 2nd Marine Brigade in Santo Domingo. In September 1924, he became Depot Quartermaster, Marine Barracks, Quantico, Virginia. He later completed instruction at the U.S. Army Infantry School, Fort Benning, Georgia, and was assigned to the Marine Corps Schools, Quantico as an instructor.

In March 1928, he was assigned two years' duty in Nicaragua, serving briefly with the 2nd Marine Brigade, and later with the Nicaragua National Guard Detachment. During this period, he organized the Presidential Guard, served as aide and personal bodyguard to President José María Moncada Tapia, and commanded a battalion of the Guardia Nacionale in jungle operations against organized bandits in northern Nicaragua.

Upon his return to the United States, he was an instructor at the Basic School, Marine Barracks, Philadelphia Navy Yard; completed the Command and General Staff School, Fort Leavenworth, Kansas; and served as an instructor again at Marine Corps Schools, Quantico. From January 1935 until May 1937, he was stationed in China, serving as a member of the Marine detachment at the Embassy of the United States in Nanjing. In June 1937, he began a three-year assignment as a section chief at Marine Corps Schools, Quantico, then served as executive officer of the 5th Marine Regiment at Quantico and Guantanamo Bay, Cuba.

=== World War II ===
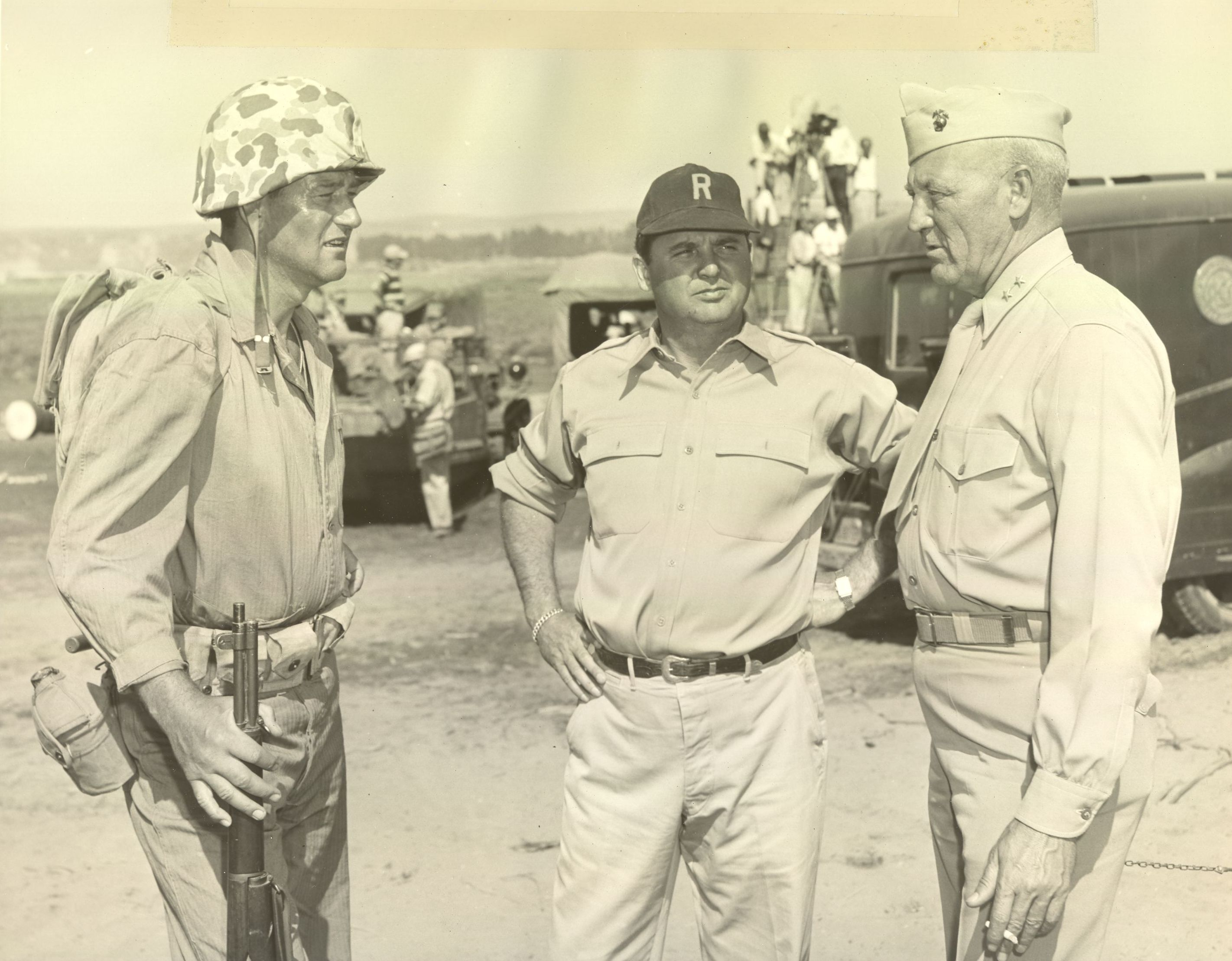
John Wayne (left) and Erskine (right) on the set of the film Sands of Iwo Jima (1949). Erskine was a technical advisor.

When World War II broke out, he was serving as chief of staff, Amphibious Force, Atlantic Fleet (later redesignated Amphibious Corps, Atlantic Fleet). In September 1942, he joined the Amphibious Corps, Pacific Fleet, in San Diego, California, as chief of staff, and performed duty in Alaska in July and August 1943 during the planning and training phase of the assault on Attu and Kiska in the Aleutians. Immediately after this, he assumed duty as chief of staff of the V Amphibious Corps and embarked for the Pacific area. Overseas, he was promoted to brigadier general in November 1943 (with rank from September 1942), and was assigned additional duty as deputy commander, V Amphibious Corps. For exceptionally meritorious service during the assault and capture of Kwajalein, Saipan, and Tinian, he received two awards of the Legion of Merit, both with combat "V". He also performed additional duties during the Marianas campaign as Chief of Staff of East Marine Force, Pacific.

Following the Marianas operation, he was promoted to major general in September 1944, and the following month assumed command of the 3rd Marine Division. He led the 3rd Division in the battle for Iwo Jima where members of the division were awarded the Presidential Unit Citation for extraordinary heroism, and he was awarded the Navy Distinguished Service Medal.

=== Post-war military career ===
Immediately after the war, as commanding general of the 3rd Marine Division then stationed on Guam, he organized vocational schools on Guam to aid Marines under his command in postwar trades and skills, prior to their return to civilian life.

In October 1945, Erksine was ordered to Washington and as a result of a special Congressional Act was appointed Administrator of the Retraining and Reemployment Administration (RRA). In June 1947, upon his request to return to duty with the Marine Corps, the general assumed command of the Marine Barracks, Marine Training and Replacement Command, Camp Pendleton, California. The following month, with the return of the 1st Marine Division from China to Camp Pendleton, he became commanding general of the 1st Marine Division, as well as commanding general of Camp Pendleton. In May 1949, he was assigned additional duty as deputy commander of Fleet Marine Force, Pacific.

During this period, the Marine air units at El Toro were molded together with the 1st Marine Division troops at Camp Pendleton, and it was this combination that embarked for Korea when hostilities erupted in that area.

In June 1950, the Secretary of Defense appointed Erskine as Chief of Military Group, Joint State-Defense Mutual Defense Assistance Program Survey Mission to Southeast Asia. In carrying out his assigned duties with the Mission, he visited the Philippines, French Indochina, Malaya, Thailand and Indonesia. Upon completing this assignment, Erskine received orders in December 1950 directing him to assume duties as commanding general of the Department of the Pacific, San Francisco, California. He also performed additional duties as Member of the Advisory Group, Western Sea Frontier; and commanding general, Marine Corps Emergency Forces, Western Sea Frontier.

In July 1951, as a lieutenant general, he became commanding general, Fleet Marine Force, Atlantic.

Upon his retirement from active duty in the Marine Corps, Erskine was advanced to four-star rank, July 1, 1953, by reason of having been specially commended for heroism in combat.

=== Department of Defense ===
He was authorized to retire from active service by a Special Act of the United States Congress in June 1953. In the same year, he became director of special operations of the United States Department of Defense, and served in this post for over eight years, until October 31, 1961.

=== Death ===
Erskine died, on May 21, 1973, at Bethesda, Maryland. He is buried at Arlington National Cemetery.

== Military awards and decorations ==
Erskine's military awards include:

1st Row	Navy Distinguished Service Medal		Silver Star Medal	Legion of Merit w/ 5/16 inch gold star & Combat "V"
2nd Row	Purple Heart Medal w/ gold star	Navy Presidential Unit Citation w/ 3/16 inch bronze star	Marine Corps Expeditionary Medal w/ 3/16 inch bronze star	World War I Victory Medal w/ Aisne, St. Mihiel, & Defensive Sector clasps
3rd Row	Nicaraguan Campaign Medal (1933)	American Defense Service Medal w/ Base clasp	American Campaign Medal	Asiatic-Pacific Campaign Medal w/ four 3/16 inch bronze stars
4th Row	World War II Victory Medal	National Defense Service Medal	Nicaraguan Medal of Merit	Knight Grand Cross, Most Exalted Order of the White Elephant
Rifle Expert Badge

== Honors ==
- Admiral Richard Byrd, during his last mission to Antarctica, named Erskine Bay in honor of Erskine.
- Honorary Chieftain in the Cherokee Indian Tribe
- Kentucky colonel.
