= List of ambassadors of the United States to China =

Ambassador of the United States to the People's Republic of China 美利坚合众国驻华大使
- Seal of the United States Department of State

- Flag of a United States ambassador

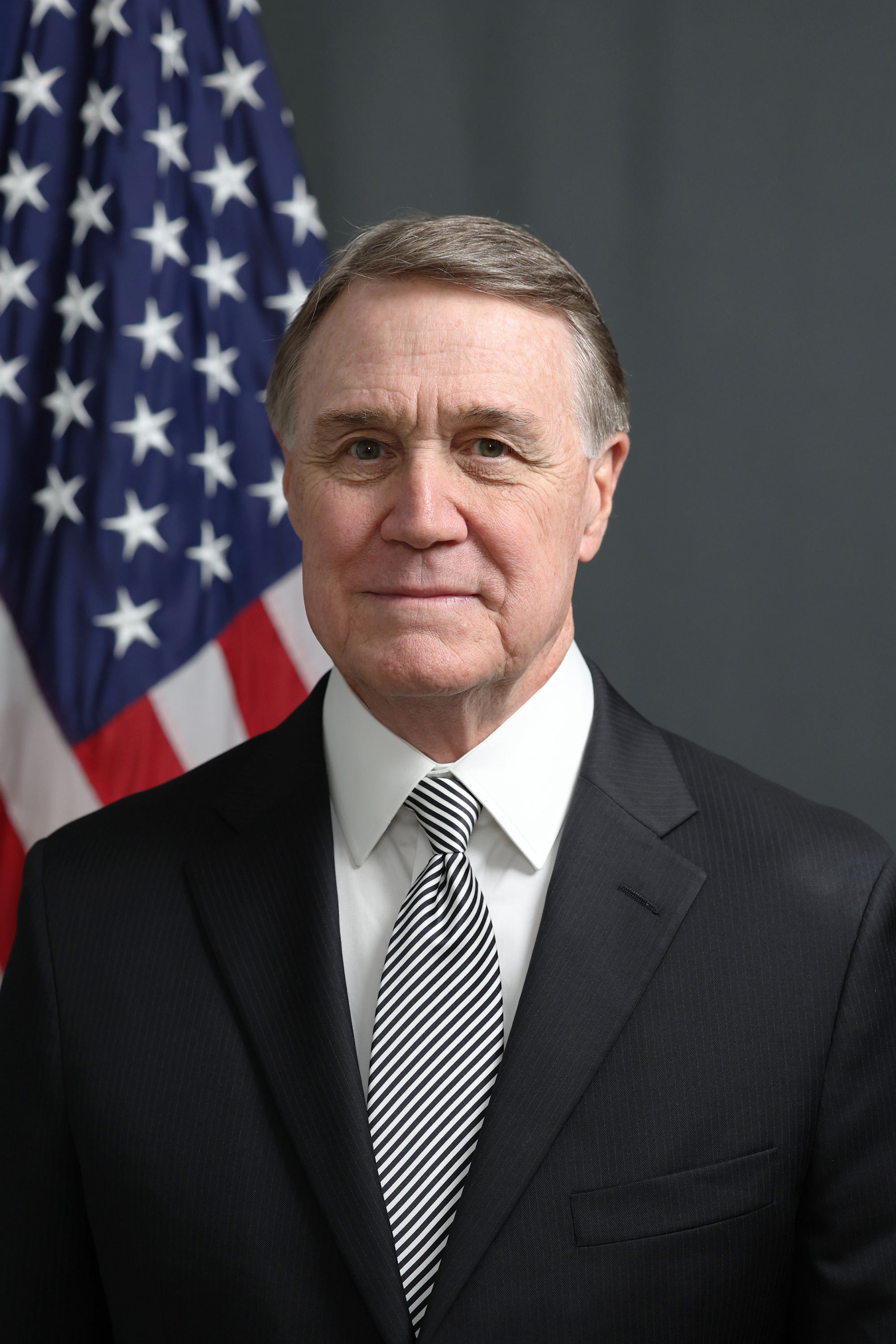
- Incumbent; David Perdue since May 16, 2025
- Residence: Beijing
- Nominator: The president
- Appointer: The president; with Senate advice and consent
- Formation: June 12, 1844; 182 years ago
- First holder: Caleb Cushing
- Website: china.usembassy-china.org.cn

The United States ambassador to China is the chief United States diplomat to the People's Republic of China. The United States has sent diplomatic representatives to China since 1844, when Caleb Cushing, as commissioner, negotiated the Treaty of Wanghia. Commissioners represented the United States in China from 1844 to 1857. Until 1898, China did not have a system in place for the Emperor to accept the Letters of Credence of foreign representatives. From 1858 to 1935, the United States representative in China was formally Envoy Extraordinary and Minister Plenipotentiary to China. The American legation in Nanjing was upgraded to an embassy in 1935 and the Envoy was promoted to Ambassador Extraordinary and Plenipotentiary.

During the republican era, the United States recognized the Beiyang Government in Beijing from 1912 to 1928 and the Nationalist Government in Nanjing (and Chongqing from 1937 to 1945) from 1928 onwards. After the Communist Party established the People's Republic of China in mainland China in 1949 and the Kuomintang moved the Republic of China government from Nanjing to Taipei of Taiwan, the United States continued to recognize the Republic of China as the legitimate Chinese government and maintained its embassy in Taiwan. However, in 1973, the United States established a Liaison Office in Beijing to represent its interests in mainland China. In 1976, the Chief of the Liaison Office was promoted to the rank of ambassador. In December 1978, the United States severed official relations with the Republic of China and in January 1979, established formal relations with the People's Republic of China. The United States Liaison Office in Beijing was upgraded to an embassy on March 1, 1979. The American Institute in Taiwan was established in 1979 to serve as the unofficial United States representative to Taiwan, with the director of its Taipei Office taking the role of a de facto ambassador.

== Chronology ==
Representation is as follows (years refer to dates of actual service):

Qing Empire:

- Commissioner to the Great Qing: 1843 to 1857
- Envoy Extraordinary and Minister Plenipotentiary: 1858 to 1912

Republic of China:

- Envoy Extraordinary and Minister Plenipotentiary to the Republic of China: 1913 to 1935
- Ambassador Extraordinary and Plenipotentiary to the Republic of China: 1935 to 1979
- Director of the Taipei Office of the American Institute in Taiwan: 1979 to present

People's Republic of China:

- Chief of the United States Liaison Office in the People's Republic of China: 1973 to 1979
- Ambassador Extraordinary and Plenipotentiary to the People's Republic of China: since 1979

== List of envoys to the Qing Empire ==
Name	Portrait	Home state	Presented credentials	Terminated
Caleb Cushing		Massachusetts	June 12, 1844	August 27, 1844
Alexander Hill Everett		Massachusetts	October 26, 1846	June 28, 1847
John W. Davis		Indiana	October 6, 1848	May 25, 1850
Humphrey Marshall		Kentucky	July 4, 1853	January 27, 1854
Robert Milligan McLane		Maryland	November 3, 1854	December 12, 1854
Peter Parker		Massachusetts	July 15, 1856	August 25, 1857
William B. Reed		Pennsylvania	May 3, 1858	November 11, 1858
John Elliott Ward		Georgia	August 10, 1859	December 15, 1860
Anson Burlingame		Massachusetts	August 20, 1862	November 21, 1867
John Ross Browne		California	October 28, 1868	July 5, 1869
Frederick Low		California	April 27, 1870	July 24, 1873
Benjamin Avery		California	November 29, 1874	November 8, 1875
George Seward		California	April 24, 1876	August 16, 1880
James Burrill Angell		Michigan	August 16, 1880	October 4, 1881
John Russell Young		New York	August 17, 1882	April 7, 1885
Charles Harvey Denby		Indiana	October 1, 1885	July 8, 1898
Edwin H. Conger		Iowa	July 8, 1898	April 4, 1905
William Woodville Rockhill		District of Columbia	June 17, 1905	June 1, 1909
William J. Calhoun		Illinois	April 21, 1910	February 26, 1913 (Note: Diplomatic relations with China interrupted on February 12, 1912 upon the abdication of Puyi.)

== List of envoys to the Republic of China ==
Name	Portrait	Home state	Presented credentials	Terminated
William J. Calhoun		Illinois	April 21, 1910	February 26, 1913 (Note: Diplomatic relations with China interrupted on February 12, 1912 upon the abdication of Puyi.)
Paul Samuel Reinsch		Wisconsin	November 15, 1913	September 15, 1919
Charles Richard Crane		Illinois	June 12, 1920	July 2, 1921
Jacob Gould Schurman		New York	September 12, 1921	April 15, 1925
John Van Antwerp MacMurray		New Jersey	July 15, 1925	November 22, 1929 (Note: Diplomatic relations with Beijing's Beiyang government terminated and recognition given to Nanjing's National Government on October 1, 1928.)
Nelson T. Johnson		Oklahoma	February 1, 1930	September 17, 1935
George Marshall		Virginia	December 20, 1945	January 1947

== List of ambassadors to the Republic of China ==
Name	Portrait	Birthplace	Presented credentials	Terminated
Nelson T. Johnson		Oklahoma	September 17, 1935	May 14, 1941
Clarence E. Gauss		Connecticut	May 26, 1941	November 14, 1944
Patrick J. Hurley		Oklahoma	January 8, 1945	September 22, 1945
John Leighton Stuart		Chekiang	July 19, 1946	August 2, 1949

The Communists took the Nationalist capital of Nanjing in April 1949, but Stuart was not recalled from China until August 1949. The United States did not recognize the new government of the People's Republic of China upon its founding in October 1949. The Consulate in Taipei was upgraded to an embassy in 1953, and therefore the Ambassador to China maintained residence at Taipei, Taiwan, in the Republic of China until relations were severed in 1979. (See: Former American Consulate in Taipei)

Name	Portrait	Home state	Presented credentials	Terminated
Karl L. Rankin		Maine	April 2, 1953	December 30, 1957
Everett F. Drumright		Oklahoma	March 8, 1958	March 8, 1962
Alan G. Kirk		New York	July 5, 1962	January 18, 1963
Jerauld Wright		District of Columbia	June 29, 1963	July 25, 1965
Walter P. McConaughy		Alabama	June 28, 1966	April 4, 1974
Leonard S. Unger		Maryland	May 25, 1974	January 19, 1979

For a list of de facto United States ambassadors to Republic of China since 1979, see list of Directors of the American Institute in Taiwan.

== List of chiefs of the United States Liaison Office in Beijing ==
Between May 1973 and March 1979 prior to the official establishment of diplomatic relations, the United States dispatched a head of United States Liaison Office in Beijing.

Name	Portrait	Home state	Presented credentials	Terminated
David K. E. Bruce		Virginia	May 14, 1973	September 25, 1974
George H. W. Bush		Texas	September 26, 1974	December 7, 1975
Thomas S. Gates Jr.		Pennsylvania	May 6, 1976	May 8, 1977
Leonard Woodcock		Michigan	July 26, 1977	March 7, 1979 (Note: Upon normalization of diplomatic relations with the People's Republic of China, Leonard Woodcock was promoted from liaison to ambassador in the new embassy.)

== List of ambassadors to the People's Republic of China ==
The United States established diplomatic relations with the People's Republic of China, and terminated them with the Republic of China, on January 1, 1979. The American Embassy at Taipei closed February 28, 1979, while the American Liaison Office at Beijing was redesignated the American Embassy on March 1, 1979.

Name	Portrait	Home state	Presented credentials	Terminated
Leonard Woodcock		Michigan	March 7, 1979	February 13, 1981
Arthur W. Hummel Jr.		Maryland	September 24, 1981	September 24, 1985
Winston Lord		New York	November 19, 1985	April 23, 1989
James Lilley		Maryland	May 8, 1989	May 10, 1991
J. Stapleton Roy		Pennsylvania	August 20, 1991	June 17, 1995
Jim Sasser		Tennessee	February 14, 1996	July 1, 1999
Joseph Prueher		Tennessee	December 15, 1999	May 1, 2001
Clark Randt		Connecticut	July 28, 2001	January 20, 2009
Jon Huntsman Jr.		Utah	August 28, 2009	April 30, 2011
Gary Locke		Washington	August 16, 2011	February 21, 2014
Max Baucus		Montana	March 20, 2014	January 16, 2017
Terry E. Branstad		Iowa	July 12, 2017	October 4, 2020
R. Nicholas Burns		Massachusetts	April 1, 2022	January 18, 2025
David Perdue		Georgia	May 16, 2025	present

== See also ==
- Embassy of the United States, Beijing
- China–United States relations
- Foreign relations of China
- Ambassadors of the United States
- Americans in China
