= Everett F. Drumright =

American diplomat (1906-1993)

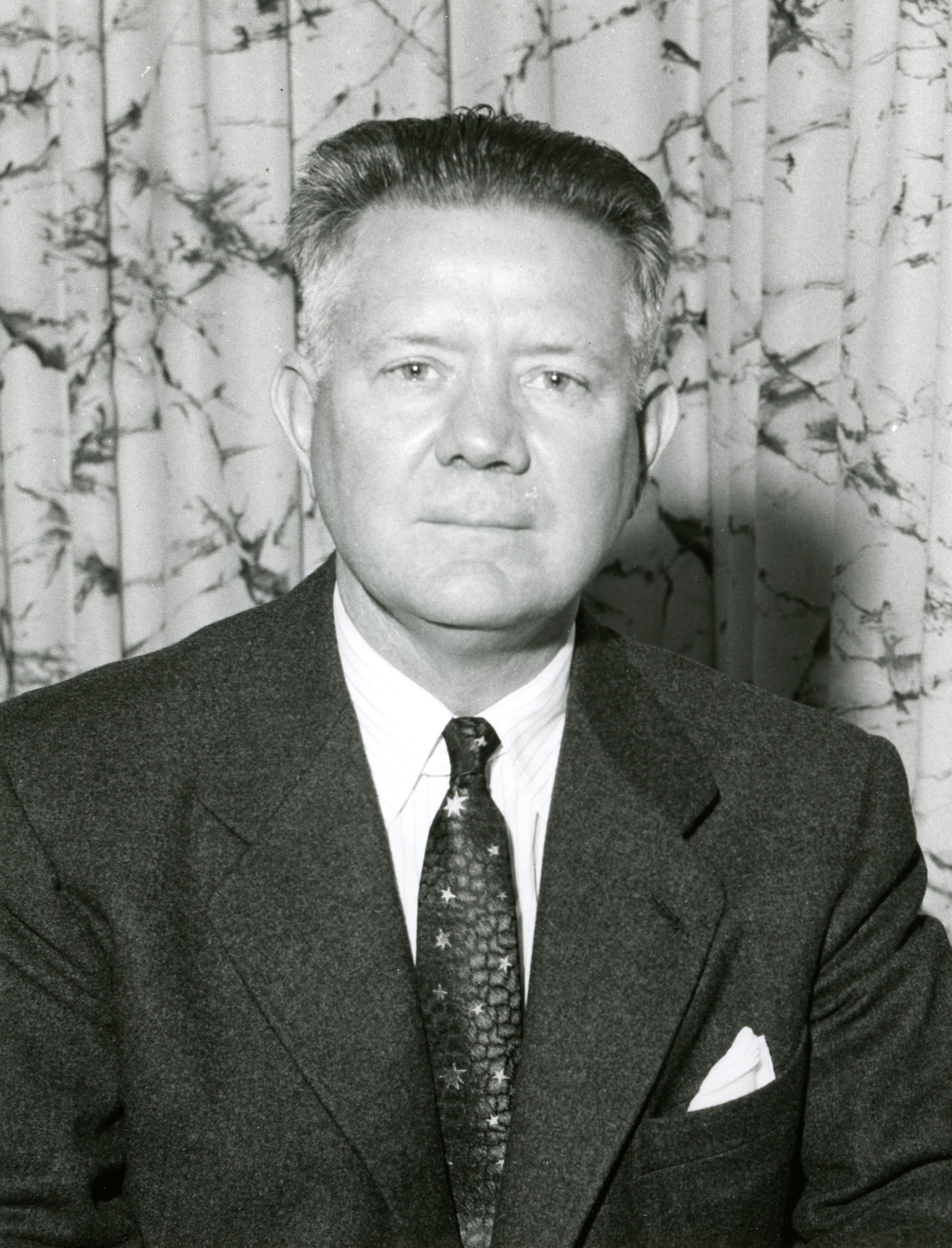

United States Ambassador to Taiwan
- In office March 8, 1958 – March 8, 1962
- President: Dwight D. Eisenhower; John F. Kennedy
- Preceded by: Karl L. Rankin
- Succeeded by: Alan G. Kirk

Personal details
- Born: September 15, 1906 Drumright, Oklahoma, U.S.
- Died: April 24, 1993 (aged 86) Poway, California, U.S.
- Resting place: Arlington National Cemetery

Everett Francis Drumright (September 15, 1906 - April 24, 1993) was an American diplomat who served in a variety of posts, including as U.S. Ambassador to the Republic of China (Taiwan).

== Early years ==
Drumright was born in Drumright, Oklahoma. He graduated from the University of Oklahoma with a degree in business administration in 1929. After graduation, Drumright briefly worked for his father's business while studying for the Foreign service exam.

== Foreign Service career ==
On January 2, 1931, Drumright began his diplomatic career as a Vice-consul in Ciudad Juárez, Mexico. He held a variety of posts with the United States Department of State, including as a language officer in China and Tokyo. In 1945, he was named as the chief of the U.S. Division of Chinese Affairs.

From 1948 to 1951, Drumright was stationed in South Korea, participating in the establishment of the U.S. Embassy Seoul. From 1951 until 1953, he worked overseas with posts in Embassy New Delhi, and Consulate General Bombay. In 1953 he was named Deputy Assistant Secretary of State for Far Eastern Affairs, and served in that post for several years.

=== United States Ambassador ===
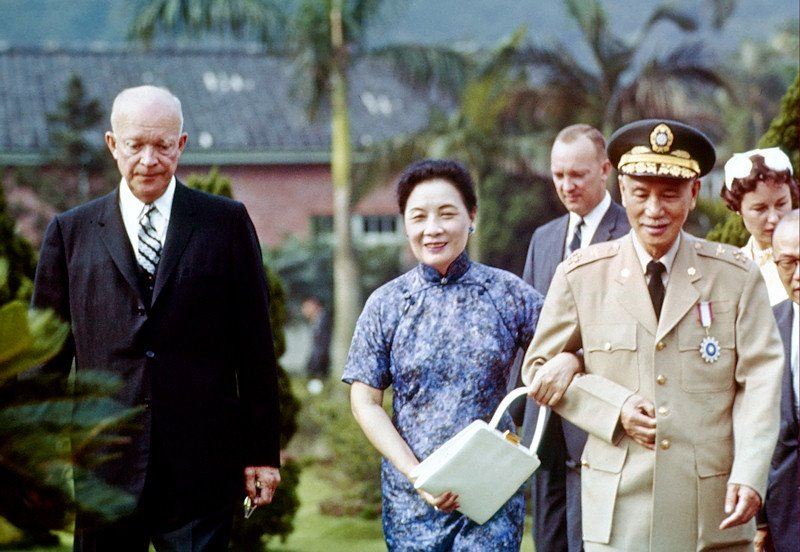
Ambassador Drumright, rear, along with President Dwight D. Eisenhower and President Chiang Kai-shek during the former's visit to Taiwan in 1960.

In 1958, Drumright was nominated by President Dwight D. Eisenhower to serve as U.S. Ambassador to the Republic of China on Taiwan. He was subsequently confirmed by the United States Senate. Drumright continued to serve in the role throughout the early years of John F. Kennedy's presidency.

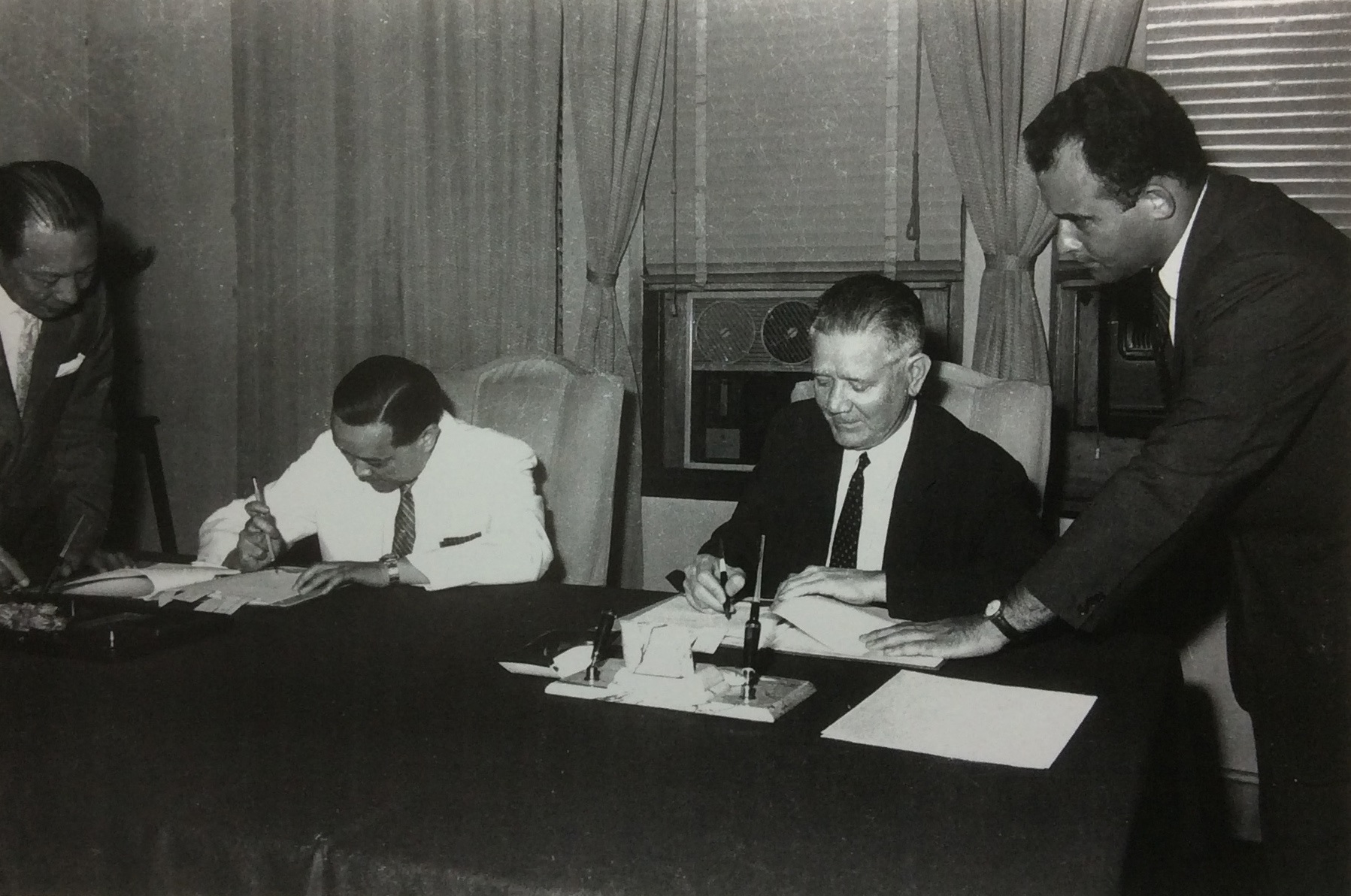
Signing ceremony of the fourth Surplus Agricultural Commodities Agreement, signed by Ambassador Drumright (right) and Foreign Minister Shen Chang-huan (left).

In 1960, Drumright worked to establish the fourth Surplus Agricultural Commodities Agreement between the Republic of China and the United States. Under the terms of the agreement, the government of the Republic of China would purchase surplus agricultural commodities and pay the United States in New Taiwan dollars. The United States agreed to then allocate those dollars towards mutual defense projects and educational exchange programs.

During his tenure in Taiwan, Drumright worked closely with Secretary of State John Foster Dulles and President Chiang Kai-shek during the crisis over Quemoy and Matsu, two islands off the China coastline. The islands were the target of takeover attempts and a propaganda campaign by the Communist Government in Beijing.

While Ambassador, Drumright resided in the building that is now known as the Taipei Film House. Drumright retired from government service in 1962.

== Personal ==
Drumright was married to Florence Teets Drumright in 1953. He served on the board of the Chinese Historical Society of Southern California.

He died in 1993 at the age of 86 at Pomerado Hospital in Poway, California.

== Legacy ==
Drumright's public papers now belong to the diplomatic archives collection at the University of Oklahoma.

After his death, a scholarship fund was established in Drumright's name to support international students at the University of Illinois at Chicago.

== See also ==
- China–United States relations
- Taiwan–United States relations

Diplomatic posts
Preceded by Karl L. Rankin	United States Ambassador to the R.O.C. March 8, 1958–March 8, 1962	Succeeded by Alan G. Kirk
