= Christ's Church, Tianshui Subdistrict =

- 天水堂
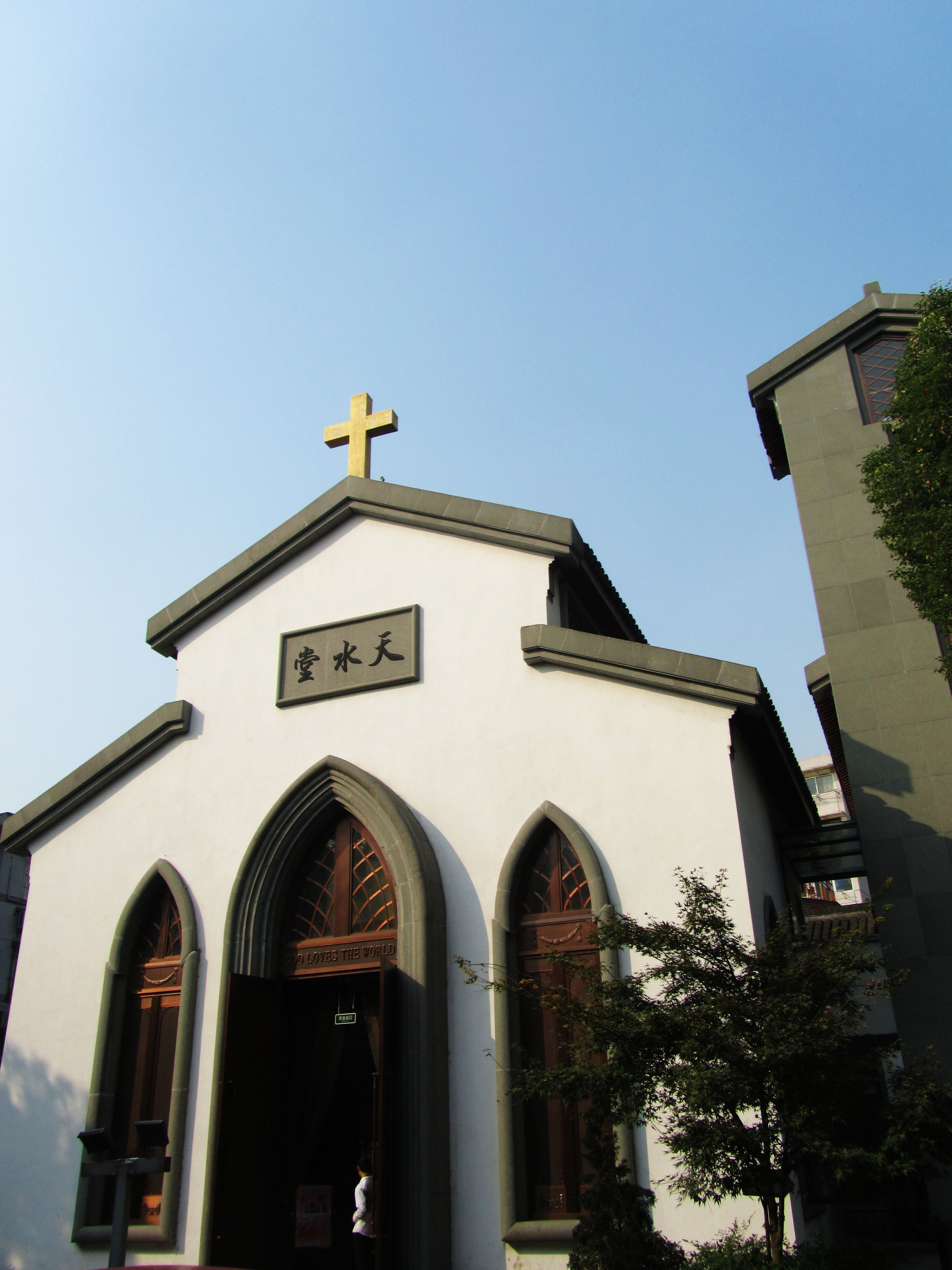
- Christ's Church, Tianshui Subdistrict in 2012

- Location in Zhejiang
- 30°16′16.9″N 120°9′44″E
- Location: Gongshu District, Hangzhou, Zhejiang, China
- Denomination: Protestantism

History
- Status: Parish church
- Founded: 1860
- Founder: John Leighton Stuart

Architecture
- Functional status: Active
- Architectural type: Church building
- Style: Chinese architecture
- Completed: 1875 (reconstruction)

Specifications
- Materials: Bricks

The Christ's Church, Tianshui Subdistrict (Chinese: 天水堂; pinyin: Tiānshuǐ Táng) is a Protestant church located in Tianshui Subdistrict, Gongshu District of Hangzhou, Zhejiang, China.

== History ==
The church was originally built by missionaries of the Presbyterian Church in the United States in 1860. After raising funds in 1874, John Leighton Stuart, father of John Leighton Stuart, rebuilt the church in 1875. In addition, he built missionary residential buildings and men's and women's schools behind the church, forming a building complex covering an area of 53,333.33 square metres (574,075.2 sq ft). John Leighton Stuart born in the church on 24 June 1876 and lived here until he was 11 years old. After John Leighton Stuart died of illness in 1913, the missionary work was replaced by Chinese priests.

The church was closed in 1958 and used as workshop of Hangzhou Chain Factory. On 5 April 1984, the church recovered part of its houses and resumed its gathering. The renovation project of the church started on 29 March 2009, and held a thanksgiving service on 25 September 2009.
