= David Bailey (diplomat) =

American diplomat

David H. Bailey

Consul General of the United States, Shanghai
- In office 1879–1880
- Preceded by: Guilford Wiley Wells
- Succeeded by: Owen N. Denny

Personal details
- Born: September 27, 1830 Wilmington, Ohio, U.S.
- Died: January 20, 1896 (aged 65) Wilmington, Ohio, U.S.

David Haworth Bailey (September 27, 1830 – January 20, 1896) was an American diplomat who served for 10 years in Hong Kong and Shanghai.

== Early life ==
Bailey was born September 27, 1830, in Wilmington, Ohio, the son of Macajah Bailey and Phebe Haworth.

He attended Woodward College in Cincinnati for 2 years. He worked an attorney at law and as a newspaper editor in Cincinnati, Leavenworth, Kansas and Wilmington, Ohio.

He was a Worthy Grand Master of the American Protestant Association of Ohio and a Right Worthy Grand Master of the national association from 1855 to 1857. He was a member of the Kansas Legislature from 1860 to 1861 and a presidential elector (Ulysses S. Grant and Schuyler Colfax) for the 6th Ohio District in 1868.

== Diplomatic career ==
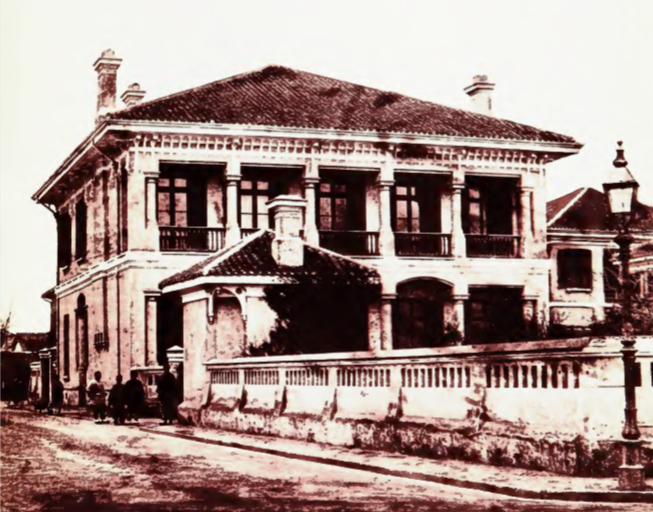
U.S. Consulate General, Shanghai, 1880. This picture was sent by Bailey to the State Department in 1880

In 1870, Bailey was appointed United States Consul in Hong Kong where he served until 1878. In that year he was appointed United States Consul General in Shanghai where he served until 1880. During that time, former President Grant visited Shanghai and Bailey was responsible for entertaining him.

John Singleton Mosby who succeeded Bailey in Hong Kong found discrepancies in his predecessor's recordkeeping, and believed Bailey had colluded with his vice-consul Loring (who Mosby fired), to bilk the government of thousands of dollars in fees. Mosby believed Bailey had pocketed fees charged Chinese emigrants sailing to the U.S. on foreign-flag ships (certifying that they emigrated voluntarily and were not part of notorious "coolie traffic"), and claimed "expenses" for shipboard examinations (by the illiterate proprietor of a local boardinghouse frequented by sailors) of those emigrating on U.S.-flag ships equal to the fees charged. Mosby thought Bailey had almost doubled his salary over the previous eight years by embezzlement and kickbacks, and stopped charging for shipboard examinations (which he personally conducted).

The investigations into allegation made by Mosby led to Bailey (and U.S. Minister George Seward's) resignations. In 1884, Bailey was sued by the United States Government for $39,000 to recover fees collected by him but not accounted for. He made no defense. At the time he was reported to still be living in Hong Kong.

== Family ==
Bailey married Clara Esther Harlan. They had four children: Barclay Bailey, Susannah Bailey who married E. Venable, Marie Bailey, and Harlan Bailey who married Lue Merrick of Austin MN. Harlan served in the Army, then spent the rest of his life serving those around him as an Episcopal priest and missionary on the West Coast.

== Death ==
Bailey died on January 20, 1896, in Wilmington Ohio.
