= Embassy of the United States, Nanjing =

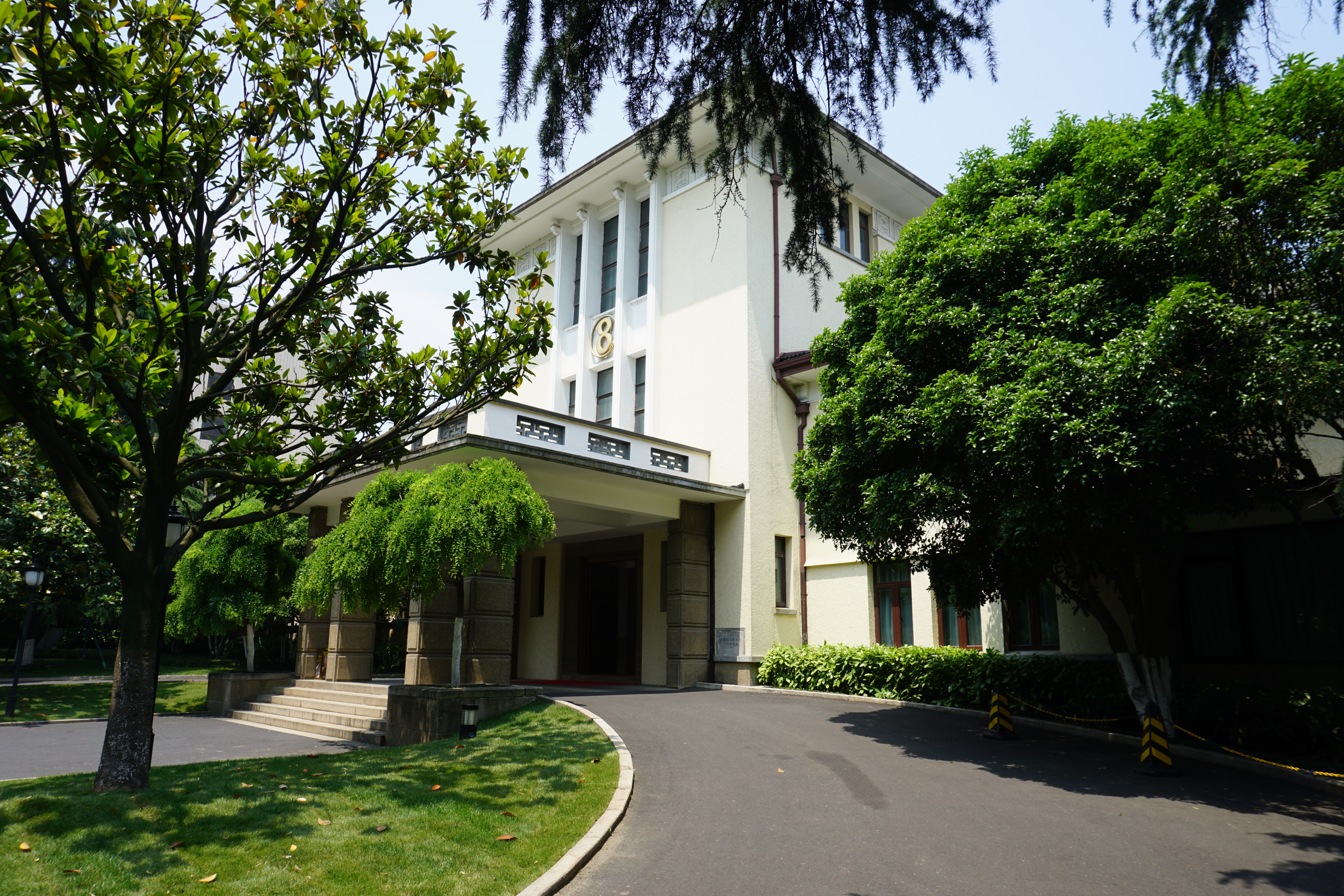
- Former U.S. Embassy in Nanjing, now Xikang Guesthouse, May 2015
- Location: Nanjing, Jiangsu, China
- Address: 33 Xikang Road (formerly 18 Xikang Road) and 82 Shanghai Road
- Coordinates: 32.063°N 118.763°E
- Opened: 1935 (Upgraded from consulate)
- Relocated: 1937
- Closed: February 18, 1950
- Ambassador: John Leighton Stuart (Last U.S. Ambassador before closure in 1950)

The Embassy of the United States, Nanjing is a former U.S. Embassy to the Republic of China from 1935 to 1937 and 1946 to 1950. It was located in Nanjing, Jiangsu, China, with a total of 2 sites situated on Shanghai Road and Xikang Road. The former embassy is now the site of the "Xikang Hotel", connected to the Provincial Committee Courtyard to the west.

The Xikang Road buildings consist of three identical Western-style buildings and three Western-style bungalows. The three brick and stone structures are two stories high with a basement level, each covering an area of 936 square meters, forming a "concave" shape. The three bungalows, built of brick and wood, are situated behind them and were employee residences, each covering an area of 96 square meters.

== History ==
The consulate at 82 Shanghai Road was upgraded from the embassy in China in 1935. After the outbreak of the Second Sino-Japanese War in 1937, the embassy followed the Chiang Kai-shek regime and relocated to Chongqing. The original building was then taken over by the Japanese army.

In April 1946, the embassy returned to Nanjing from Chongqing and was relocated to 33 Xikang Road (formerly 18 Xikang Road). The original Shanghai Road consulate was then turned into a press office.

After the People's Liberation Army entered Nanjing in April 1949, the U.S. Ambassador to China, John Leighton Stuart, left in August. After the establishment of the People's Republic of China, the last U.S. diplomat in China, P.B. Peck, left Nanjing for the U.S. on February 18, 1950, leading to the closure of the embassy. After that, the embassy was moved from Nanjing to Taipei until the United States established diplomatic relations with the People's Republic of China in 1979.

In November 1952, with the restoration of Jiangsu's provincial governance, the Chinese Communist Party Jiangsu Provincial Committee was established and moved into the former embassy site at 33 Xikang Road, where they stayed until they moved to a newly constructed building in 1960.
