= Karl L. Rankin =

American diplomat (1898–1991)

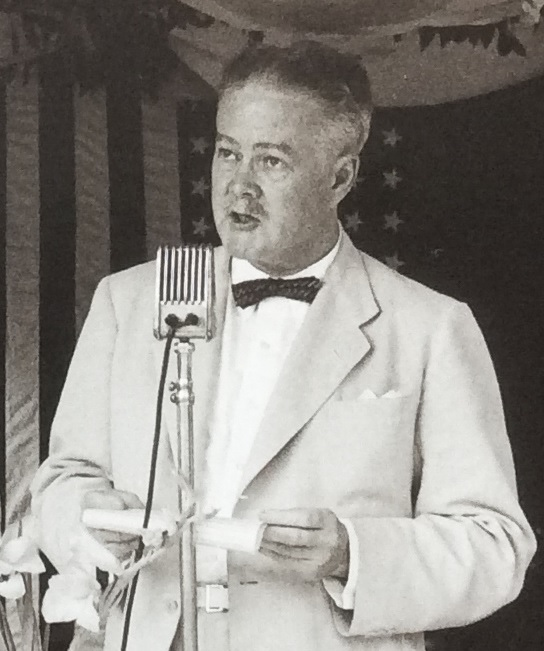
- Rankin delivering remarks at National Taiwan University Hospital's new facility groundbreaking ceremony, 31 August 1953

United States Ambassador to Yugoslavia
- In office December 13, 1957 – April 22, 1961
- Preceded by: James Williams Riddleberger
- Succeeded by: George F. Kennan

United States Ambassador to China
- In office April 2, 1953 – December 30, 1957
- Preceded by: John Leighton Stuart
- Succeeded by: Everett F. Drumright

Personal details
- Born: September 4, 1898 Manitowoc, Wisconsin, United States
- Died: January 15, 1991 (aged 92) Kennebunkport, Maine, United States
- Education: California Institute of Technology; Federal Polytechnic Institute; Princeton University

Military service
- Allegiance: United States
- Branch/service: United States Navy
- Battles/wars: World War I

Karl Lott Rankin (September 4, 1898 – January 15, 1991) was an American diplomat from Wisconsin.

== Background ==
Rankin was born September 4, 1898, to Emmet and Alberta Rankin in Manitowoc, Wisconsin. He would serve in the United States Navy during World War I and attended college at the California Institute of Technology, the Federal Polytechnic Institute in Zurich, Switzerland; and Princeton University.

== Diplomatic career ==
As an official for the United States Department of State, Rankin began his career as Assistant Trade Commissioner in Prague, Czechoslovakia from 1927 to 1929. Later, he would serve as Commercial Attaché in Prague from 1929 to 1932, in Athens, Greece and Tirana, Albania from 1932 to 1939, in Brussels, Belgium and Luxembourg from 1939 to 1940, in Belgrade, Serbia and Yugoslavia from 1940 to 1941, and in Cairo, Egypt in 1944. While working as Commercial Attaché in Belgrade in 1940, Rankin also served a U.S. Consul. From 1941 to 1942, Rankin was detailed to Manila, Philippines. Rankin returned to Athens in 1944, this time as Economic Officer, serving until 1946. He would hold the same position in Vienna, Austria from to 1946 to 1947, when he again returned to Athens as Counselor until 1949. That year Rankin was promoted to U.S. Consul General in Canton, China; and also became Consul General in Hong Kong from 1949 to 1950. Rankin was appointed U.S. Chargé d'Affaires to the Republic of China, based in Taipei, from 1950 to 1953, before being named Ambassador from 1953 to 1957. Finally, Rankin returned to Yugoslavia, serving as U.S. Ambassador from 1957 to 1961.

== Personal life ==
Rankin was first married to Pauline Jordan on October 3, 1925. After his retirement from the diplomatic corps, they made his home in South Bridgton, Maine. In 1964, he published a memoir, China Assignment. Pauline Rankin died in 1976 and he married Ruth Thompson Garcelon in 1978. Rankin died of prostate cancer on January 15, 1991, in Kennebunkport, Maine. He was a Congregationalist.
