= Alan Goodrich Kirk =

United States Navy admiral

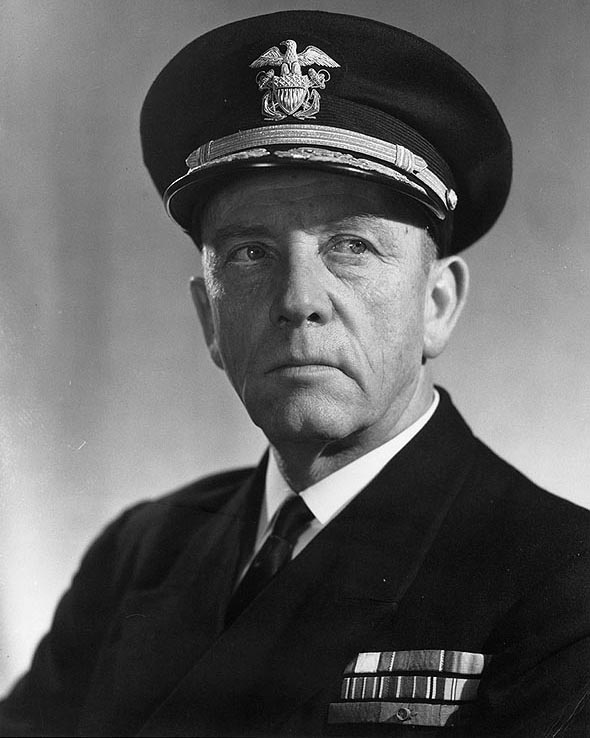
- Admiral Alan G. Kirk

United States Ambassador to Taiwan
- In office June 7, 1962 – January 18, 1963
- President: John F. Kennedy
- Preceded by: Everett F. Drumright
- Succeeded by: Jerauld Wright

United States Ambassador to the Soviet Union
- In office July 4, 1949 – October 6, 1951
- President: Harry S. Truman
- Preceded by: Walter Bedell Smith
- Succeeded by: George F. Kennan

United States Ambassador to Belgium concurrent with United States Ambassador to Luxembourg
- In office April 1, 1946 – May 6, 1949
- President: Harry S. Truman
- Preceded by: Charles W. Sawyer
- Succeeded by: Robert Daniel Murphy

Personal details
- Born: Alan Goodrich Kirk; October 30, 1888 Philadelphia, Pennsylvania, U.S.
- Died: October 15, 1963 (aged 74) Washington, D.C., U.S.
- Resting place: Arlington National Cemetery
- Spouse: Lydia Chapin (m. 1918)
- Relatives: Caspar F. Goodrich (uncle)
- Education: United States Naval Academy

Military service
- Allegiance: United States
- Branch/service: United States Navy
- Years of service: 1909–1946
- Rank: Admiral
- Commands: U.S. Naval Forces, France
- Battles/wars: World War I; World War II
- Awards: Navy Distinguished Service Medal; Legion of Merit

Alan Goodrich Kirk (October 30, 1888 – October 15, 1963) was a United States Navy admiral during World War II who most notably served as the American senior naval commander during the Normandy landings. After the war he embarked on a diplomatic career serving as U.S. ambassador to Belgium, the Soviet Union and the Republic of China (Taiwan).

== Biography ==
Kirk graduated from the United States Naval Academy in the class of 1909. His classmates included Jesse B. Oldendorf, Olaf M. Hustveldt, and Theodore S. Wilkinson. Kirk served in the United States Navy during World War I and World War II. During his wartime naval service, Kirk became the U.S. naval attaché in London (1939 to 1941). He was Director of the Office of Naval Intelligence from March 1941 but, obstructed and opposed by Rear Admiral Richmond Turner, he was unable to develop the office into an effective center along the lines of the British Royal Naval Operational Intelligence Centre (which he had seen while in London). Eventually, he requested a transfer to an Atlantic destroyer squadron.

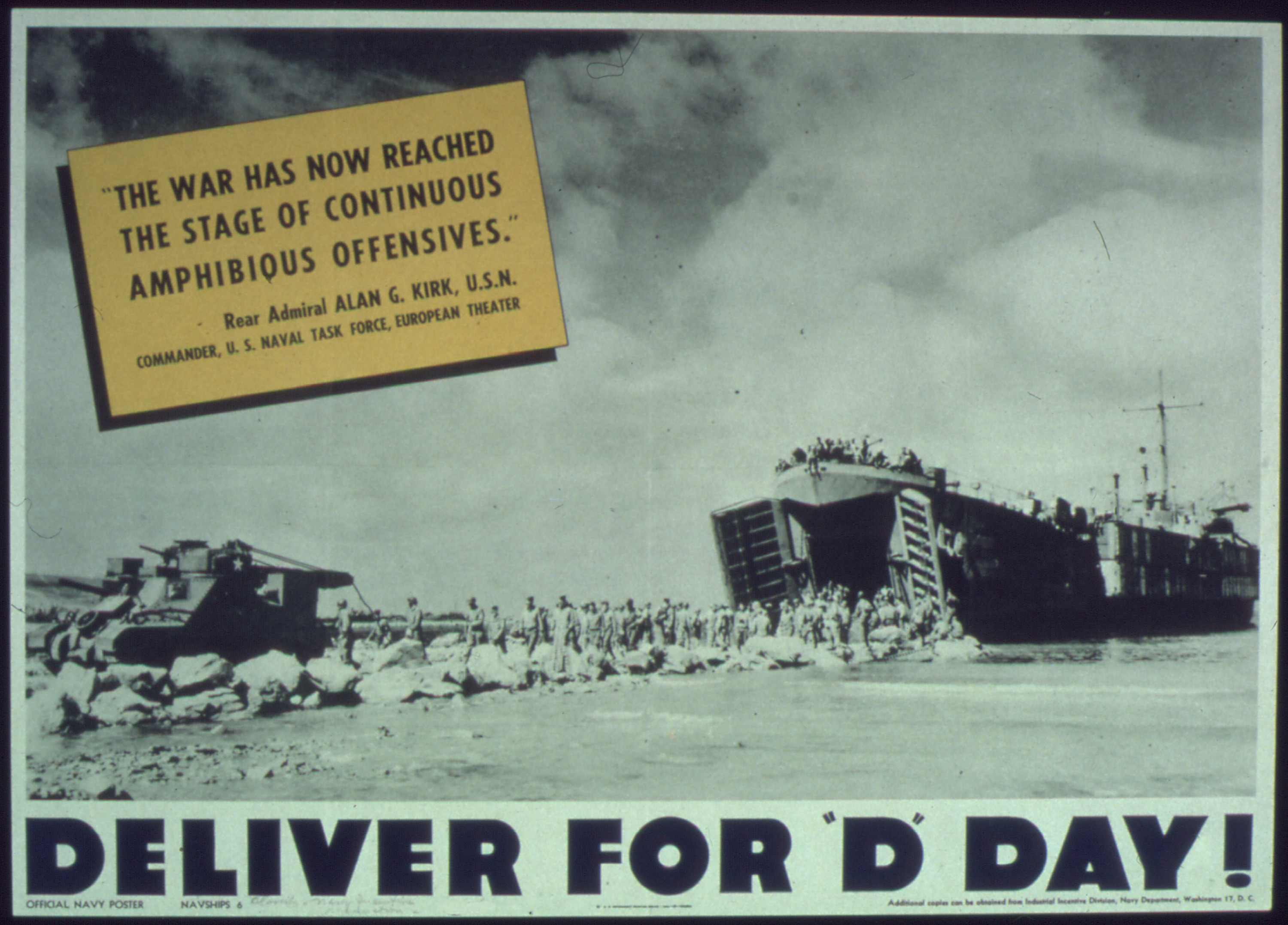
Quote, "Deliver for D-Day!"

Kirk served as an amphibious commander in the Mediterranean in 1942 and 1943 (the Allied invasion of Sicily and Italy). In addition, he was the senior U.S. naval commander during the Normandy landings of June 6, 1944 where he commanded the Western Naval Task Force embarked on the heavy cruiser USS Augusta. He served as Commander U.S. Naval Forces in France during 1944 and 1945. He retired from the Navy as a full admiral in 1946. He was decorated with Legion of Honour by the Provisional Government of the French Republic for his World War II service.

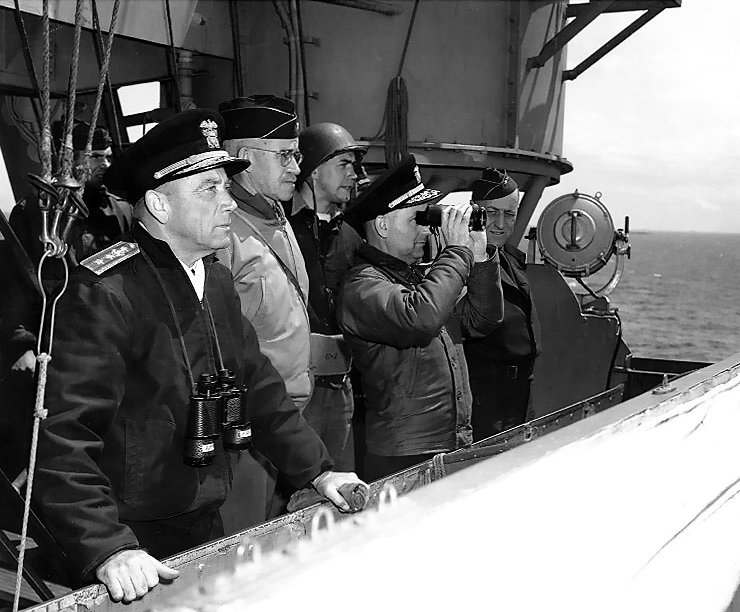
Senior officers watching operations from the bridge of USS Augusta (CA-31), off Normandy, June 8, 1944. They are (from left to right): Rear Admiral Alan G. Kirk, Lieutenant General Omar Bradley, Rear Admiral Arthur D. Struble (with binoculars), and Major General William B. Kean.

After retirement from the United States Navy, Kirk embarked on a diplomatic career, and subsequently served in several United States embassies abroad, beginning with the combined posting of U.S. Ambassador to Belgium/U.S. Envoy to Luxembourg (resident in Brussels, Belgium), 1946–49; as U.S. Ambassador to the Soviet Union, July 4, 1949, to October 6, 1951; and finally as United States Ambassador to the Republic of China (Taiwan), June 7, 1962, to January 16, 1963. He served as ambassador to the Soviet Union during the beginning of the Korean War, and expressed concern that the conflict could escalate to World War III, comparing it to proxy conflicts of the 1930s such as the Spanish Civil War and the Soviet–Japanese border conflicts which he believed precipitated World War II.

Admiral Kirk took his post as the second president of American Committee for the Liberation of the Peoples of Russia, in February 1952. As a former U.S. ambassador to the Soviet Union, he oversaw the recruitment of emigres in New York City and Munich, a group that would later form the core of Radio Liberty's staff. Less than a year after taking office, Kirk was forced to resign due to poor health. Also in 1952, he served briefly as Director of the Psychological Strategy Board, which planned for and coordinated government psychological operations.

In 1962 he was portrayed onscreen in the film The Longest Day by Australian actor John Meillon.

Alan Goodrich Kirk died on October 15, 1963, in New York at the age of 74 and was buried at Arlington National Cemetery.

== See also ==
- Perle Mesta

Diplomatic posts
Preceded by Charles W. Sawyer	United States Ambassador to Belgium; 1946 – 1949	Succeeded by Robert Daniel Murphy
Preceded by Walter Bedell Smith	United States Ambassador to the Soviet Union; 1949 – 1951	Succeeded by George F. Kennan
Preceded by Everett Drumright	United States Ambassador to Taiwan; 1962 – 1963	Succeeded by Jerauld Wright
