= Benjamin Parke Avery =

American journalist (1828–1875)

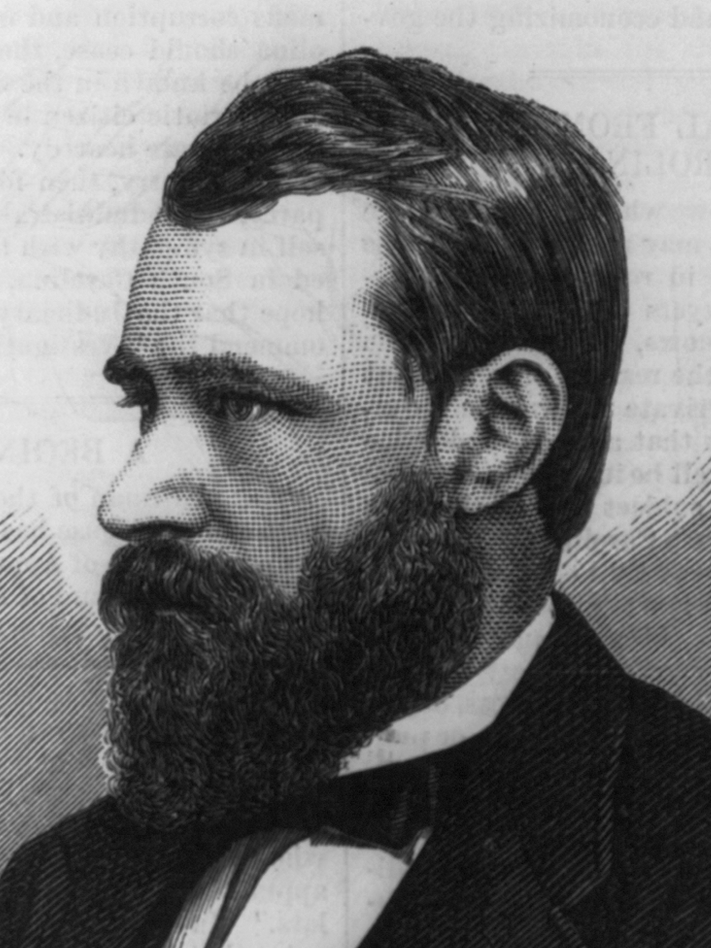
Benjamin Parke Avery in 1874, U. S. Minister to China

Benjamin Parke Avery (1828–1875) was an American journalist, poet, essayist, printer, and diplomat. He served as a U.S. Department of State’s chief of mission for China in 1874.

== Biography ==
Avery arrived in California aboard the Aurora in 1849. He worked as a prospector for a while before buying a drug store in the mining town of North San Juan, California, and then a newspaper.

He became part owner and editor for the Marysville Appeal. A newspaper he established in San Francisco was also contracted as state printer for California. He was friends with Charles Crocker and Leland Stanford.

He served as a U.S. Department of State’s chief of mission (now known as ambassador) for China in 1874.

== Death and legacy ==
He died in Peking (now Beijing) on November 8, 1875. His death received newspaper coverage and tribute.

After his death, Edward Bosqui wrote a reminisce about him and Ina Coolbrith dedicated a poem to him. The California Historical Society has a collection of his papers.

== See also ==
- List of ambassadors of the United States to China
