= John Leighton Stuart =

American missionary and diplomat (1876–1962)

Rev. John Leighton Stuart DD DHL
- 司徒雷登
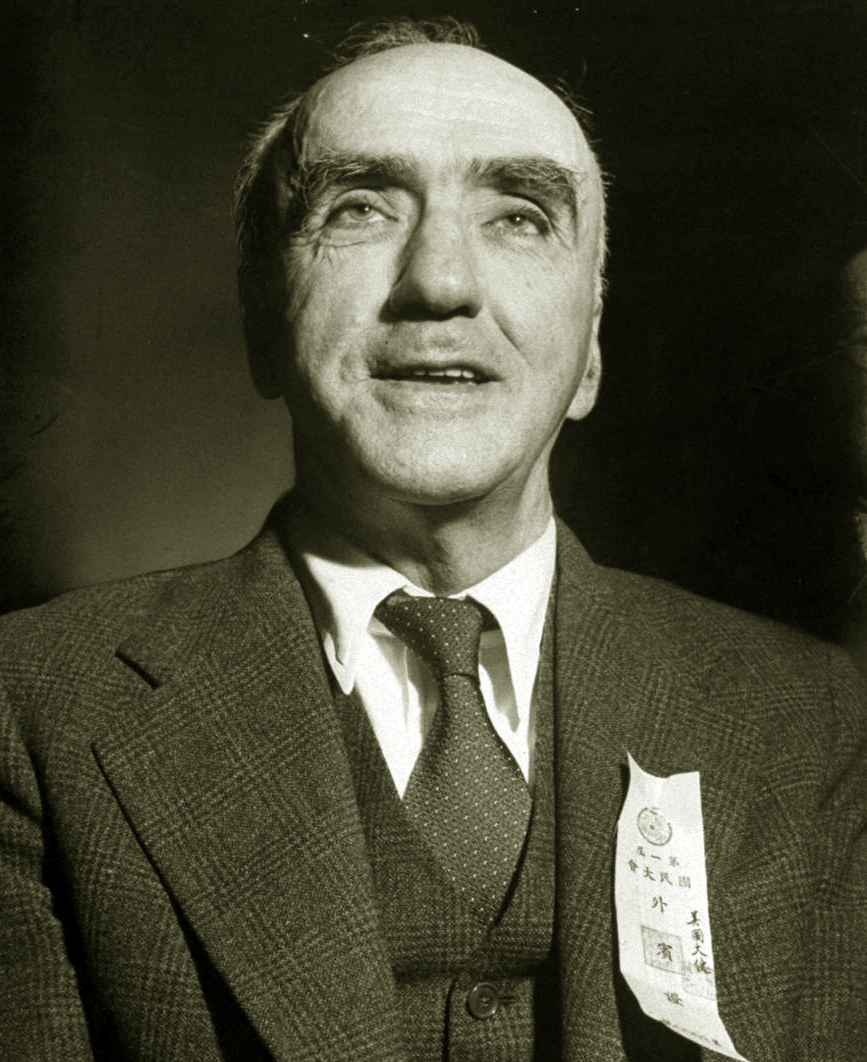
- Stuart in 1948

4th United States Ambassador to the Republic of China
- In office July 10, 1946 – November 28, 1952
- Appointed by: Harry S. Truman
- Preceded by: Patrick J. Hurley
- Succeeded by: Karl L. Rankin

1st President of Yenching University
- In office January 1919 – 1945
- Succeeded by: Wu Leichuan (acting)

Personal details
- Born: June 24, 1876 Christ's Church, Hangzhou, Zhejiang, China
- Died: September 19, 1962 (aged 86) Washington D.C., United States
- Resting place: Anxianyuan Cemetery, Hangzhou, Zhejiang, China; 30.393194°N 120.207990°E
- Citizenship: United States
- Education: Hampden–Sydney College; Union Theological Seminary; (DD)
- Occupation: Missionary; Educator; Diplomat
- Awards: Doctor of Humane Letters by Princeton (1933); Honorary Citizen of Hangzhou (1946)

John Leighton Stuart (Chinese: 司徒雷登; pinyin: Sītú Léidēng; June 24, 1876 – September 19, 1962) was a missionary educator, the first President of Yenching University and later United States ambassador to China. He was a towering figure in U.S.-China relations in the first half of the 20th century, a man TIME magazine described as "perhaps the most respected American in China." According to one Chinese historian, "there was no other American of his ilk in the 20th century, one who was as deeply involved in Chinese politics, culture, and education and had such an incredible influence in China."

== Early life ==
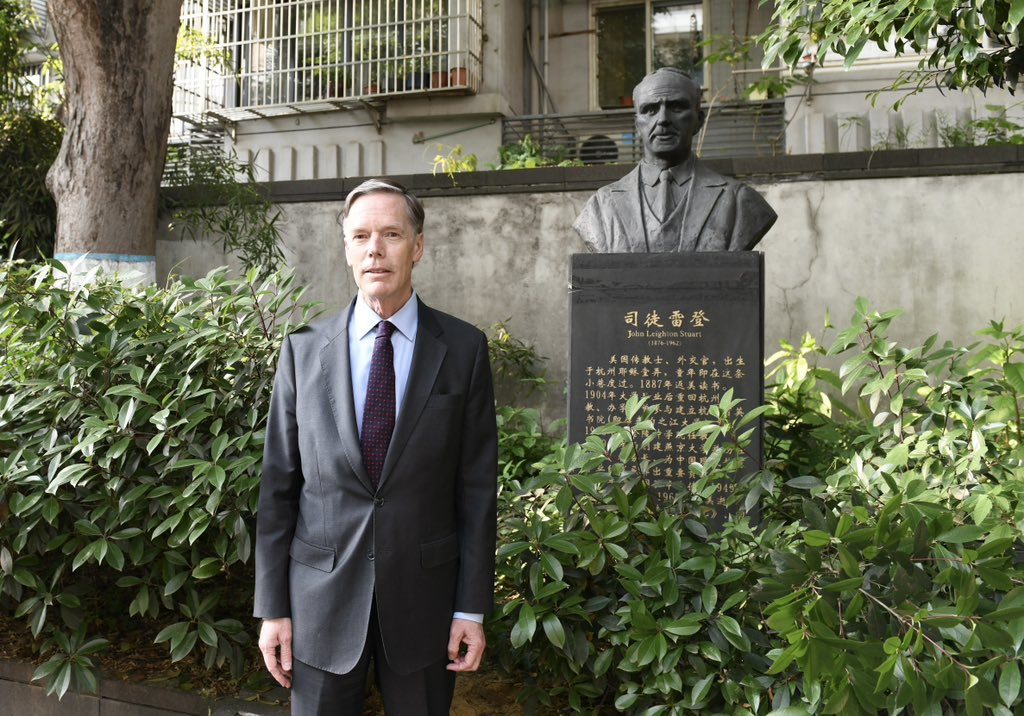
Ambassador R. Nicholas Burns in the former home of John Leighton Stuart in Hangzhou

Stuart was born in Hangzhou, China, on June 24, 1876, of Presbyterian missionary parents from the United States. His father was a third-generation Presbyterian minister from a distinguished family in Virginia and Kentucky (cousins included J.E.B. Stuart, John Todd Stuart and Mary Todd). They arrived in China in 1868, one of the first three Presbyterian ministers sent to China from the U.S. and the first Christian minister to preach in Hangzhou. Stuart's mother, Mary Horton (known affectionately as "Mother Stuart" in Hangzhou), founded the Hangzhou School for Girls, one of the first institutions of its kind in China. His mother's family had played a leading role in the American revolution in Boston, where her Yankee brand of Calvinism valued and promoted the education of women. Stuart had three younger brothers, David Todd (1878), Warren Horton (1880) and Robert Kirland (1883).

Although an American by nationality who spoke English with a Southern accent, Stuart considered himself more Chinese than American. He spoke the Hangzhou dialect. At age 11, he left China to live for several years with relatives of his mother in Mobile, Alabama. At 16, he was sent to prep school in Virginia, where his outdated clothing and mid-19th century diction handed down from his missionary family in China made him a target for teasing by classmates. He graduated from Hampden-Sydney College and later Union Theological Seminary in Richmond, Virginia, where he aspired to become a missionary educator, inspired by the influence of Robert Elliott Speer.

== Missionary and academic ==
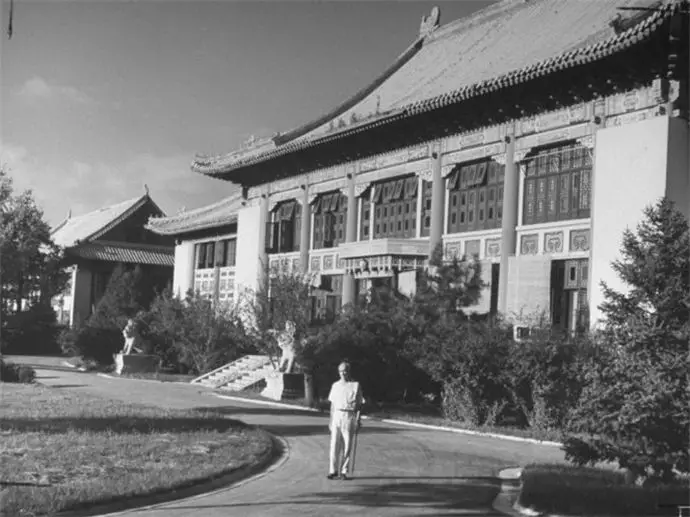
Dr. Stuart at the campus he created in Beijing, 1946

In 1904, after his marriage, he returned to China with his wife, Aline Rodd, of New Orleans, and became a second-generation missionary in China. There, he helped to establish Hangchow Presbyterian College, which later became Zhejiang University. Together, they had one child, Jack, who would become a Presbyterian minister also.

In 1908, Stuart became a professor of New Testament Literature and Exegesis at the Nanking Theological Seminary. During his tenure, he published 'Essentials of New Testament Greek in Chinese' and 'Greek-Chinese-English Dictionary of the New Testament' (1918). His missionary work in China was sponsored by U.S. President Woodrow Wilson's church in Washington, D.C., where Stuart preached and visited Wilson in the White House on home leave. Stuart's family had close ties with Wilson's family in Staunton, Virginia, where Stuart's father, John Linton, had been named after Wilson's uncle.

In January 1919, Stuart became the first president of Yenching University. Over the next two decades, he built "the Beijing institution into China's greatest university" according to the historian John Pomfret. He established financial, educational and physical foundations of the institution. He quickly made the university among the top universities, and the leading Christian institution, in China. He developed the Yenching campus (now home to Peking University) in traditional Chinese architectural styles, even though many Chinese faculty preferred a campus more western in design. Stuart's hope was that China would one day absorb the institution as its own, rather than view it as an imposition of cultural imperialism. He also served on the Board of Trustees of Tsinghua University. He forged partnerships between Yenching and Harvard University, and in 1928 helped to create the Harvard–Yenching Institute, an important legacy in cultural exchange. He also formed partnerships with Princeton University, Wellesley College, and the University of Missouri. He cared much about students and teachers and their interactions and is remembered fondly by Yenching alumni for performing their weddings and for hosting an ongoing salon for student intellectuals on campus. Princeton awarded him an honorary doctorate of humane letters in 1933. In 1936, Yenching threw him a 60th birthday banquet, where kitchen and cleaning workers presented him with a plaque to hang above his door that read, "His kindness knows no class boundaries."

After the establishment of the People's Republic of China in 1949, Yenching University ceased to exist. In 1952, Peking University relocated to the Yenching campus and absorbed most of its academic departments while Tsinghua University absorbed other departments. The official Peking University history museum makes no mention of Stuart or the institution's western ties, yet the campus stands as his memorial.

== Political activities ==
"Stuart was the consummate friend of China," wrote historian John Pomfret. "In the 1910s, he had argued that Americans should educate the Chinese more and proselytize them less. Stuart had been an early advocate of tearing up the unequal treaties with China, calling on the United States in 1925 to take the lead with 'an act of aggressive goodwill." He supported Chinese nationalism. He was sympathetic to students and faculty at Yenching who participated in May Fourth Movement (1919–1921) and May Thirtieth Movement (1925). He favored the Northern Expedition (1926-1927) against the warlord factions in Beijing. He led a protest with Yenching students against the Japanese invasion of Manchuria (1937). When the invaders overran Beijing in 1937, the Japanese ordered Stuart to fly the puppet regime flag at the Yenching University campus and offer his personal "thanks" to the Japanese military for the institution's "liberation". Stuart, well known among Chinese as a man with a strong moral conscience, declined promptly, sending a terse note to the Japanese commander: "We are refusing to comply with these orders." He resisted Japanese aggression in China in his sermons and speeches on campus and in travels throughout the country. After Japan's attack on Pearl Harbor, the Japanese incarcerated Stuart in Beijing for three years and eight months until the war ended.

His deep involvement with China's politics, education and culture won him respect among Chinese intellectuals and students during the 1930s and 1940s. Wen Yiduo, a scholar whom Mao Zedong and the Chinese communists often praised, expressed his respect and admiration for John Leighton Stuart in his famous last speech. Yet, when Wen Yiduo's last speech was included in Chinese textbooks in Mainland China, the paragraph praising John Leighton Stuart was deleted.

== U.S. Ambassador to China ==
On July 4, 1946, Stuart was appointed the U.S. Ambassador to China and, in this position, worked in concert with George C. Marshall to mediate between Nationalists and Communists. He forged ties with the leaders in the Nationalist Party, particularly Chiang Kai-shek, and with Communist leader Zhou Enlai, both of whom spoke the same Zhejiang dialect as Stuart. He had taught and protected underground Communist Party members at Yenching University, some of whom had become party leaders. The efforts of Marshall and Stuart to mediate between the Kuomintang and the Chinese Communist Party (CCP) are commemorated in the Zhou Enlai/Deng Yingchao Memorial Hall in Nanjing.

After Marshall's departure from China in January 1947, Stuart led the mediation efforts that changed from all-out support of the Nationalist government to mediating the coalition government, to negotiating an understanding with the Chinese Communist party. When the Nationalist government fled Nanjing, and Communist forces entered the city in April 1949, Stuart maintained the U.S. Embassy in Nanjing. He sought accommodation with the Communist Party in an effort to maintain U.S. presence and influence in China, making contact through a graduate of Yenching University, Huang Hua, who became a member of the Nanjing Military Council.

In recommending constructive engagement as an alternative to the official U.S. policy toward China, "Stuart came to advocate the kind of asymmetrical Cold War response to communism that George F. Kennan envisioned and that Yale Professor John Gaddis described in his 1980 Bernath Prize Lecture to the Society for Historians of American Foreign Relations." At the time, however, Washington was unwilling to open a dialogue with Communist China.

In reaction to the State Department White Paper on China, CCP chairman Mao Zedong published a sarcastic essay Farewell, Leighton Stuart!, which was long taught in Chinese schools as one of the founding documents of the revolution. Mao wrote:

John Leighton Stuart, who was born in China in 1876, was always a loyal agent of U.S. cultural aggression in China. He started missionary work in China in 1905 and in 1919 president of Yenching University, which was established by the United States in Peking. He has fairly wide social connections and spent many years running missionary schools in China, he once sat in a Japanese gaol during the War of Resistance. On July 11, 1946, he was appointed U.S. ambassador to China. On August 2, 1949, because all the efforts of U.S. imperialism to obstruct the victory of the Chinese people's revolution had completely failed, Leighton Stuart had to leave China quietly.

Stuart was recalled to the U.S. on August 2, 1949, and formally resigned as ambassador on November 28, 1952. He was the last person to hold that position before resumption of diplomatic relations between the two countries three decades later. After suffering a stroke that incapacitated him for the remainder of his life, Stuart died in Washington, D.C. in 1962. His obituary in The New York Times reported, "During his years as a missionary and educator, Dr. Stuart -- gentle mannered and humane -- was one of the most respected Americans in China."

Stuart's memoirs, Fifty Years in China, were not completed when he was incapacitated by a stroke. The last three chapters of the book were finished by Stanley Hornbeck of the U.S. State Department, who also made revisions in earlier chapters.

== Final wish and official recognition ==
Stuart specified in his will that he be buried in China, in Beijing, at the Yenching University campus, where his wife was buried following her death in 1926. In November 2008, his ashes were finally taken to China from Washington and buried where his father and mother and a brother were interred, at his birthplace, Hangzhou.

On September 4, 2016, CCP general secretary Xi Jinping recognized Stuart during a banquet held to welcome the heads of foreign delegations attending the G20 Summit in Hangzhou, noting to the assembled crowd of diplomats, "A hundred and forty years ago, in June 1876, John Leighton Stuart, the former US ambassador to China, was born here in Hangzhou. He went on to live in China for over 50 years and was buried in Hangzhou." Chinese historians said it was the first time since Mao Zedong's famous essay that a top Chinese official had recognized Stuart in public, a signal of the rehabilitation of Stuart's official reputation in modern China.

Fifty years after Stuart left China, Hangzhou officials restored the Stuart house in Hangzhou as a memorial to the family's contributions to China. The design of the house, a New Orleans style double gallery with garconniere in the rear, was inspired by Aline Rodd Stuart's childhood home on Chestnut Street in the Garden District of New Orleans.

The improved Chinese view on Stuart's personality was vividly pictured in the Chinese television series Diplomatic Situation where he is one of the main positive characters.

== Works ==
- The Essentials of New Testament Greek in Chinese. Based on Huddilston's the Essentials of New Testament Greek (1917)
- The Jerusalem Meeting of the International Missionary Council: March 24 - April 8, 1928. The christian life and message in relation to non-christian systems. Christianity and Confucianism, Volume 1 (1928)
- John Leighton Stuart (1946). Fifty Years in China: The Memoirs of John Leighton Stuart, Missionary and Ambassador. Random House. pp. 5–6. ISBN 978-1-40670-5294.
- The Challenge of Asia to Christianity

== References and further reading ==
- Shaw, Yu-ming (1992). An American Missionary in China: John Leighton Stuart and Chinese-American Relations'. Cambridge: Council on East Asian Studies Harvard University: Distributed by Harvard University Press. ISBN 978-0-674-47835-0.
- Philip West, Yenching University and Sino-Western Relations, 1916-1952 (Cambridge: Harvard University Press, 1976).
- Charles W. Hayford, "The Ashes of the American Raj in China; John Leighton Stuart, Edgar Snow, and Pearl S. Buck," The Asia-Pacific Journal Vol 50-5-08, December 9, 2008 .
- Kenneth W Rea, John C Brewer, ed., John Leighton Stuart: The Forgotten Ambassador: The Reports of John Leighton Stuart, 1946-1949 (Westview Press 1981), ISBN 0-86531-157-9.
- John Leighton Stuart (1946). Fifty Years in China: The Memoirs of John Leighton Stuart, Missionary and Ambassador. Random House. pp. 5–6. ISBN 978-1-40670-5294.
- John Leighton Stuart, Greek-Chinese-English dictionary of the New Testament (Presbyterian Mission Press 1918).
- Mao Tse-tung, "Farewell, Leighton Stuart!," In: Selected Works of Mao Tse-tung (Beijing, Foreign Languages Press 1969), vol. IV, p. 433-440.

Diplomatic posts
Preceded by Patrick J. Hurley	US Ambassador to China; 1946–1949	Succeeded by Karl L. Rankin
