= Arthur Goldschmidt =

Arthur Goldschmidt may refer to:

- Arthur Goldschmidt Jr., historian of Egypt and professor of Middle East history
- Arthur E. Goldschmidt, American economist and diplomat
