= Gung Ho! =

1943 war film directed by Ray Enright

- Realart reissue film poster
- Directed by: Ray Enright
- Written by: Lt. W. S. LeFrançois USMCR (based on his Saturday Evening Post story "We Mopped Up Makin Island")
- Screenplay by: Lucien Hubbard; Joseph Hoffman
- Produced by: Walter Wanger
- Starring: Randolph Scott
- Cinematography: Milton R. Krasner
- Edited by: Milton Carruth
- Music by: Frank Skinner
- Production company: Walter Wanger Productions
- Distributed by: Universal Pictures
- Release date: December 20, 1943 (United States)
- Running time: 88 minutes
- Country: United States
- Language: English
- Budget: $866,898
- Box office: $2,176,489

Gung Ho! (full title: Gung Ho!: The Story of Carlson's Makin Island Raiders) is a 1943 American war film directed by Ray Enright and starring Randolph Scott. The story is based somewhat on the real-life World War II Makin Island raid led by Lieutenant Colonel Evans Carlson's 2nd Marine Raider Battalion.

== Plot ==
Lieutenant C.J. Cristoforos announces that the United States Marine Corps is seeking volunteers for a hazardous mission and special unit. Among the volunteers are a hillbilly who, when asked whether he can kill someone, responds that he already has. Other volunteers include Harbison, an ordained minister who wants the most dangerous assignment because that is where he will be needed most; "Pig Iron", a boxer from a background of poverty and hard work; Frankie Montana (from Brooklyn), who resents being called a "no-good kid" who is initially rejected by Cristoforos but wins him over; battling half-brothers Larry O'Ryan and Kurth Richter; a Filipino wishing to avenge his sister, who was caught in Manila by the Japanese, who teaches the Raiders knife fighting; an embittered Marine whose brother was killed at Pearl Harbor; a man who fought against fascism in Spain and Greece; and one Marine who admits, "I just don't like Japs".

Sgt. "Transport" Anderof is reunited with the commander of the unit, Lt. Col. Thorwald, with whom he served in China. Thorwald explains that he left the Marine Corps to serve with the Chinese communist Eighth Route Army fighting the Japanese during the Second Sino-Japanese War to find out about them and evaluate their chances. Afterward, Thorwald decided to form a unit using the qualities of Gung Ho or "work together".

Those who make it through the training are sent to Hawaii for further jungle warfare training, where they witness the damage of the attack on Pearl Harbor. In Hawaii they hear a radio bulletin announcing the Battle of Guadalcanal. The Marines are ordered to board two submarines destined for a commando raid on a Japanese-held island.

After a claustrophobic voyage, the Raiders invade the island from rubber boats. The Marine landing is met by fire from snipers hiding in palm trees. The Marines dispose of them, attack the Japanese headquarters, wipe out the garrison, destroy installations with explosives, then board the submarines for their return home.

== Cast ==
- Randolph Scott as Lt. Col. Thorwald
- Alan Curtis as Pvt. John Harbison
- Noah Beery Jr. as Cpl. Kurt Richter
- J. Carrol Naish as Lt. C.J. Cristoforos
- Sam Levene as Plt Sgt. Leo "Transport" Andreof
- David Bruce as Larry O'Ryan
- Richard Lane as Capt. Dunphy
- Walter Sande as Gunner McBride
- Louis Jean Heydt as Lt. Roland Browning
- Robert Mitchum as Pvt. "Pig-Iron" Matthews
- Rod Cameron as Pvt. Rube Tedrow
- Grace McDonald as Kathleen Corrigan
- Milburn Stone as Cmdr. Blake
- Peter Coe as Pvt. Kozzarowski
- Harold Landon as Pvt. Frankie Montana
- Chet Huntley as Narrator

== Production ==
When producer Walter Wanger acquired the rights to the Makin Island raid and Lt. W.S LeFrançois' story, the United States Navy film liaison Lt. Albert J Bolton insisted that neither Carlson nor his executive officer James Roosevelt be singled out. The screenplay depicted a fictional Lt. Col. Thorwald with no executive officer. The screenplay did include a character played by J. Carrol Naish, a Raider lieutenant of Greek extraction based on Marine Raider Lt. John Apergis as well as Gunnery Sergeant Victor "Transport" Maghakian who served in the raid and survived the war. Though many incidents in the film did not occur in the real Makin Island raid, Carlson wrote to Wanger that he was pleased with the film.

Like many other films about the United States Marine Corps, the movie was filmed at Marine Corps Recruit Depot San Diego and Camp Pendleton with Marine extras and technical advisors including Carlson, Maghakian and Lt. Wilfred Sylvio LeFrancois with all three men being awarded the Navy Cross on the actual raid. The Japanese were played by Chinese and Filipino extras.

== Themes ==
The fast-moving film is a template for many war films and other adventure or western films where a group of professional killers and misfits in polite society are handpicked by an inspiring leader, trained to perfection, then use their initiative and skills in marksmanship, combat and knife fighting on an enemy who greatly outnumber them.

Thorwald/Carlson lectures throughout the film that the Japanese have no initiative and cannot think for themselves or deviate from a plan; thus unexpected action pays off. This is demonstrated in several scenes where a Marine defeats his opponent in unarmed combat by spitting tobacco in his eyes, a small but fast runner strips down to his trousers and quickly zig-zags through enemy fire to hurl hand grenades at a machine-gun nest, Marines destroy a Japanese pillbox and its occupants by squashing both with a road construction steamroller, and a speechless Robert Mitchum who has been shot in the throat and is unable to give warning, kills a Japanese infiltrator attempting to kill the battalion surgeon (Milburn Stone) by throwing his knife in the Japanese soldier's back. The climax of the film has the Raiders painting a giant American flag on the roof of a building, then luring the counterattacking Japanese to the area where their own air force bombs and strafes them.

In contrast to the Japanese and the rest of the American military, Thorwald orders that his officers wear no rank insignia and have no special privileges. He tells his Raiders, "I will eat what you eat and sleep where you sleep" and participate in the same training. Thorwald's Marines participate in "Gung Ho Sessions" where they discuss the unit's plans and each man participates without regard to rank.

== Reception ==
Bosley Crowther in a January 1944 review for The New York Times praised the film, its performances and settings but said "the stabbings and stickings go on ad nauseum. [sic] Gung Ho! is for folks with strong stomachs and a taste for the submachine gun".

=== Box Office ===
The movie was a big hit and earned profits of $577,460.

It recorded admissions in France of 748,212 when released there in 1945.

=== Re-issue ===
The film was re-released in the early 1950s by Realart Pictures who gave Robert Mitchum second billing on the posters.

The film has often been shown to recruits and Marines of the United States Marine Corps.

== Influences on popular culture ==
In the early 1960s Louis Marx and Company came out with a "Gung Ho Commando Outfit" for children.

== See also ==
- Public domain film
- List of American films of 1943
- List of films in the public domain in the United States
