= Abe Kōsō =

Japanese vice admiral and war criminal (1892–1947)

Kōsō Abe
- 阿部 孝壮
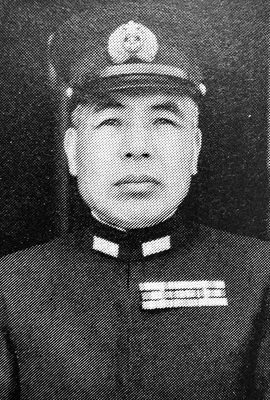
- Born: March 24, 1892; Mikawa, Yamagata, Japan
- Died: June 19, 1947 (aged 55); Asan-Maina, Guam
- Education: Imperial Japanese Naval Academy
- Military career
- Allegiance: Empire of Japan
- Branch: Imperial Japanese Navy
- Service years: 1912–1945
- Rank: Vice admiral
- Units: Azuma, Yakumo, Izumo, Yamakaze, Akikaze, Asama, Naka, Ashigara, Haruna, Yamashiro, Hyūga
- Commands: Jintsu, Naka, Tenryū, Mikuma, Myōkō, Hiei; 6th Air Base Group; Tateyama Naval Gunnery School
- Conflicts: World War II; Battle of the Coral Sea; Makin Raid

Kōsō Abe (阿部 孝壮, Abe Kōsō; March 24, 1892 – June 19, 1947) was a vice admiral in the Imperial Japanese Navy during World War II.

== Biography ==
=== Early career ===
A native of what is now the town of Mikawa, Yamagata prefecture in northern Japan, Abe was a graduate of the 40th class of the Imperial Japanese Naval Academy in 1912. He ranked 73rd out of 144 cadets. He served as midshipman on the cruisers Azuma and Yakumo from 1912 to 1913, and after commissioning as an ensign in 1915, was assigned to the cruiser Izumo. He returned to naval artillery and torpedo school later that year, and did not graduate until late 1917, so he was unable to participate in combat operations in World War I.

As a lieutenant from 1918, lieutenant commander from 1924, and commander from 1930, he served as chief gunnery officer on the destroyers Yamakaze and Akikaze, cruisers Asama, Naka and Ashigara, and battleships Haruna, Yamashiro and Hyūga. He was promoted to captain on 15 November 1934.

Abe was given his first command on November 15, 1935, the cruiser Jintsu. He subsequently served as captain of Naka, Tenryū, Mikuma, Myōkō, and Hiei in the 1930s.

Abe was promoted to rear admiral on November 15, 1940. He commanded the transport division for the Port Moresby Invasion Force in abortive Operation Mo during the Battle of the Coral Sea.

=== The Makin Raid incident ===
From February 5, 1942 – November 29, 1943, Abe was commander of the 6th Base Force at Kwajalein in the Marshall Islands. As such, he was essentially the wartime military governor of the Marshall Islands, Gilbert Islands, Nauru, Ocean Island and Wake Island in the central Pacific Ocean.

On August 17–18, 1942, a force of approximately 200 US Marine commandos landed by submarine and raided Makin Island. The Makin Island raid was intended to destroy Japanese installations, gather intelligence data, test raiding tactics, boost home front morale, and possibly to divert Japanese attention from Guadalcanal. At a loss of 30 men, the US Marines killed the 85-160 Japanese on the island, destroyed the radio station, fuel depot, supplies and installations. The raid attracted much attention in the American press, spawning a 1943 propaganda movie entitled Gung Ho!. Nine US Marines who had been accidentally left behind during the raid were captured by Japanese forces, and moved as prisoners of war to Kwajalein, where they were held for about a month.

The initial plan was to send those American prisoners to Japan for incarceration. However, reportedly over the protests of Captain Yoshio Obara (a local Japanese commander on Kwajalein) and Commander Hiusakichi Naiki (the chief of military police on Kwajalein), Abe ordered the execution of the prisoners by beheading on October 16, 1942.

Personal Report of Howard Ward

Personal Howard O. Ward

=== Subsequent career ===
From December 27, 1943 – April 25, 1945, Abe was Commandant of the Tateyama Naval Gunnery School in Tateyama, Chiba, Japan. Until the end of the war, he served as a commander of base units at Sasebo Naval Base in Kyūshū, Japan.

=== War crimes trial and execution ===
After the war, Abe was arrested by SCAP authorities and charged with war crimes, largely based on witness testimony regarding the Makin Raid Incident. Abe was extradited to Guam, where a military tribunal convicted him on May 23, 1946, of "violation of the law and custom of war and the moral standards of civilized society." Abe was executed by hanging on Guam on June 19, 1947. His remains were not returned to his family.

Obara was sentenced to 10 years in prison, and Naiki to five years in prison, for their roles in the executions.
