= Arthur E. Goldschmidt =

American economist and diplomat

Arthur Eduard Goldschmidt (February 17, 1910 - September 21, 2000) was an American economist and diplomat who served as United States Ambassador to the United Nations Economic and Social Council.

== Biography ==
Goldschmidt was born and raised in San Antonio, and received a bachelor's degree from Columbia University in 1932. He was a friend of President Lyndon B. Johnson.

He began his career in the U.S. government at the Federal Emergency Relief Administration where he served from 1933 to 1936. He worked for the Power Division of the Public Works Administration from 1938 to 1940 and was chief of the United States Department of the Interior's power division from 1942 to 1949 before working for the United Nations in 1950. As director of the division of power, he assisted the United States Secretary of Energy in supervising the discharge of the Department's responsibilities in electric power matters.

From 1950 to 1967, Goldschmidt was director of technical assistance for the special fund operations of the United Nations. He was the United States representative at the United Nations Economic and Social Council from 1967 to 1969 with the rank of ambassador, succeeding James Roosevelt.

Goldschmidt died on September 21, 2000, at a retirement community in Haverford, Pennsylvania.
