= Evans Carlson =

United States Marine Corps general

Evans Fordyce Carlson
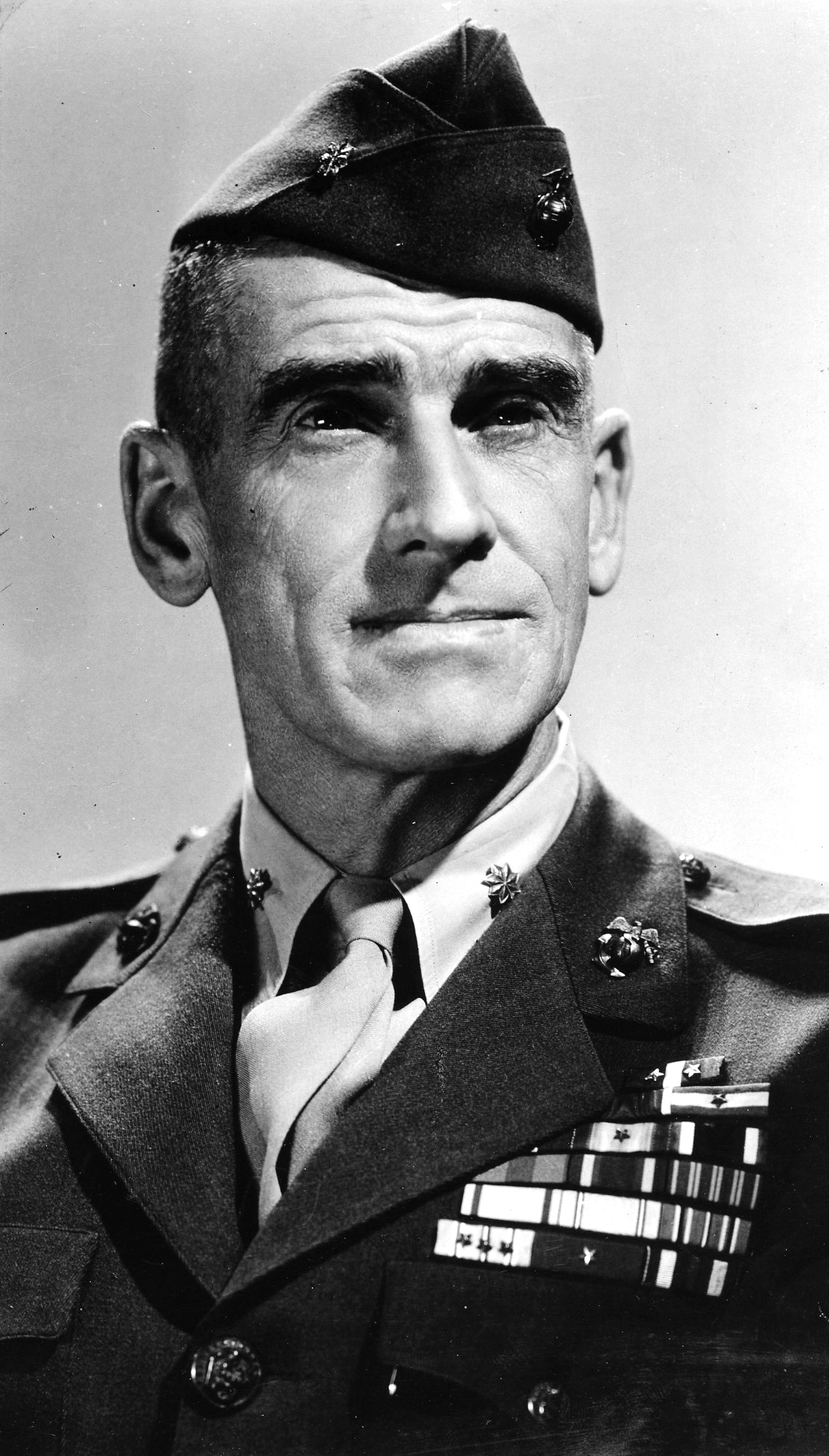
- Carlson c. 1942–1945
- Born: February 26, 1896; Sidney, New York, U.S.
- Died: May 27, 1947 (aged 51); Portland, Oregon, U.S.
- Burial place: Arlington National Cemetery
- Military career
- Allegiance: United States
- Branch: United States Army; United States Marine Corps
- Service years: 1912–1921 (Army); 1922–1939, 1941–1946 (Marine Corps)
- Rank: Brigadier general
- Unit: 2nd Marines
- Commands: 2nd Raider Battalion
- Conflicts: Pancho Villa Expedition; World War I; United States occupation of Nicaragua; Second Sino-Japanese War (observer); World War II; Makin Island Raid; Guadalcanal campaign; Carlson's patrol; Battle of Tarawa; Battle of Saipan
- Awards: Navy Cross (3); Legion of Merit; Purple Heart Medal (2); Combat Action Ribbon; Croce al Merito di Guerra (Italy)

Evans Fordyce Carlson (February 26, 1896 – May 27, 1947) was a United States Marine Corps officer who led "Carlson's Raiders" during World War II. Many credit Carlson with developing the tactics and attitude that would later come to define America's special operations forces. He is renowned for the "Makin Island raid" in 1942, and his raiders' "Long Patrol" (aka Carlson's patrol) behind Japanese lines on Guadalcanal, in which 488 Japanese were killed. Carlson popularized the phrase "gung-ho".

== Early years ==
Evans Carlson was born on February 26, 1896, in Sidney, New York, the son of a Congregationalist minister. He ran away from his home in Vermont in 1910 and two years later disguised his age to enter the United States Army.

== U.S. Army service ==
Enlisting in the army at the age of sixteen, he served in the Philippines and Hawaii. Discharged in 1915 after earning the rank of sergeant, he was recalled to active duty by the National Guard after the Battle of Columbus (1916), serving as an instructor in El Paso.

== World War I ==
During World War I, John J. Pershing awarded Carlson the Purple Heart Medal. In 1918, he was promoted captain of artillery and served in Germany with the Army of Occupation. In October 1919, he was discharged from the army.

== U.S. Marine Corps career ==
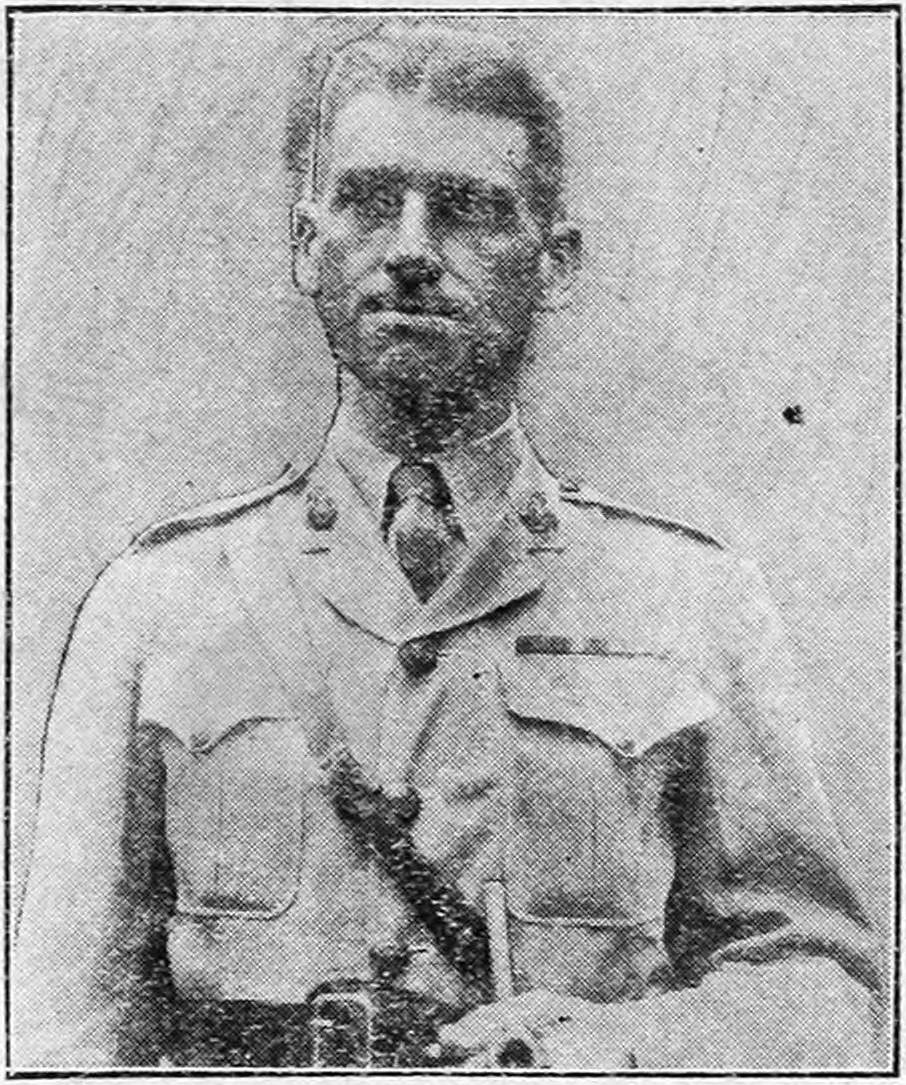
First Lieutenant Carlson in The China Weekly Review, September 14, 1929

In 1922, Carlson joined the Marines, and was commissioned a second lieutenant in 1923. While based in Marine Corps Base Quantico, Carlson was a horse agent for Smedley Butler, before a short tour aboard the USS Nevada (BB-36). Then in February 1925, he started a nine month flight course at Naval Air Station Pensacola, but was cut after only four months. In 1926, he was stationed in Portland, Oregon. In February 1927, he was deployed to Shanghai, China, where he served until 1929.

=== Nicaragua ===
Carlson was ordered to Nicaragua in 1930 as an officer in the Guardia Nacional. A first lieutenant at the time, he earned the Navy Cross for leading 12 Nicaraguan soldiers in a night attack against 100 Sandinistas threatening Portillo. Carlson also led the relief mission following the 1931 Nicaragua earthquake at Managua. He was then made Managua's chief of police in 1932. In 1933, he joined the American troop withdrawal following the 1932 Nicaraguan general election.

=== Friendship with the Roosevelts ===
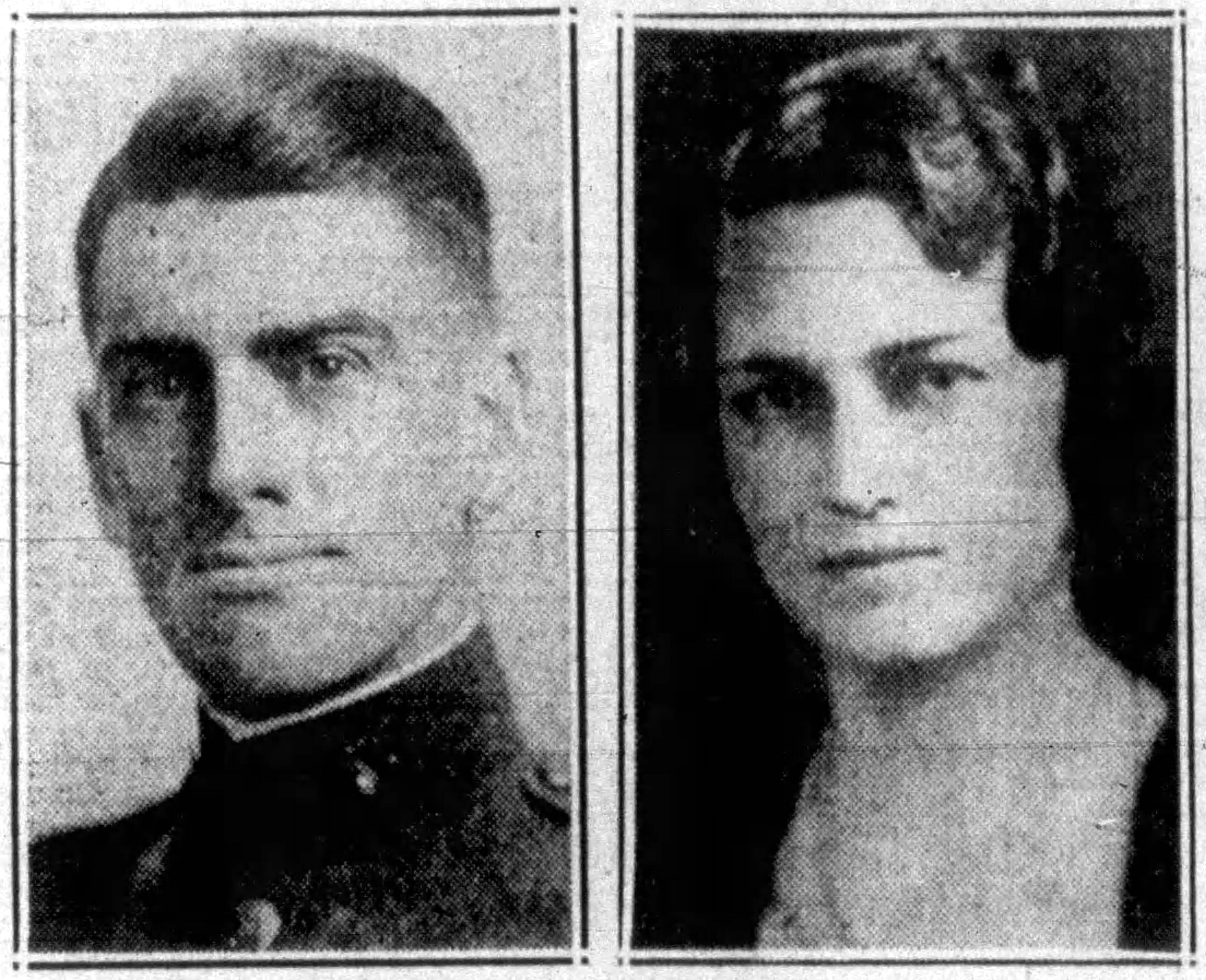
Captain and Mrs. Evans F. Carlson c. 1931

Carlson served as executive officer of the Marine Corps Detachment at President Roosevelt's alternative White House and vacation retreat at Warm Springs, Georgia, where he became closely acquainted with President Franklin D. Roosevelt and his son James.

=== Second and third China tours ===
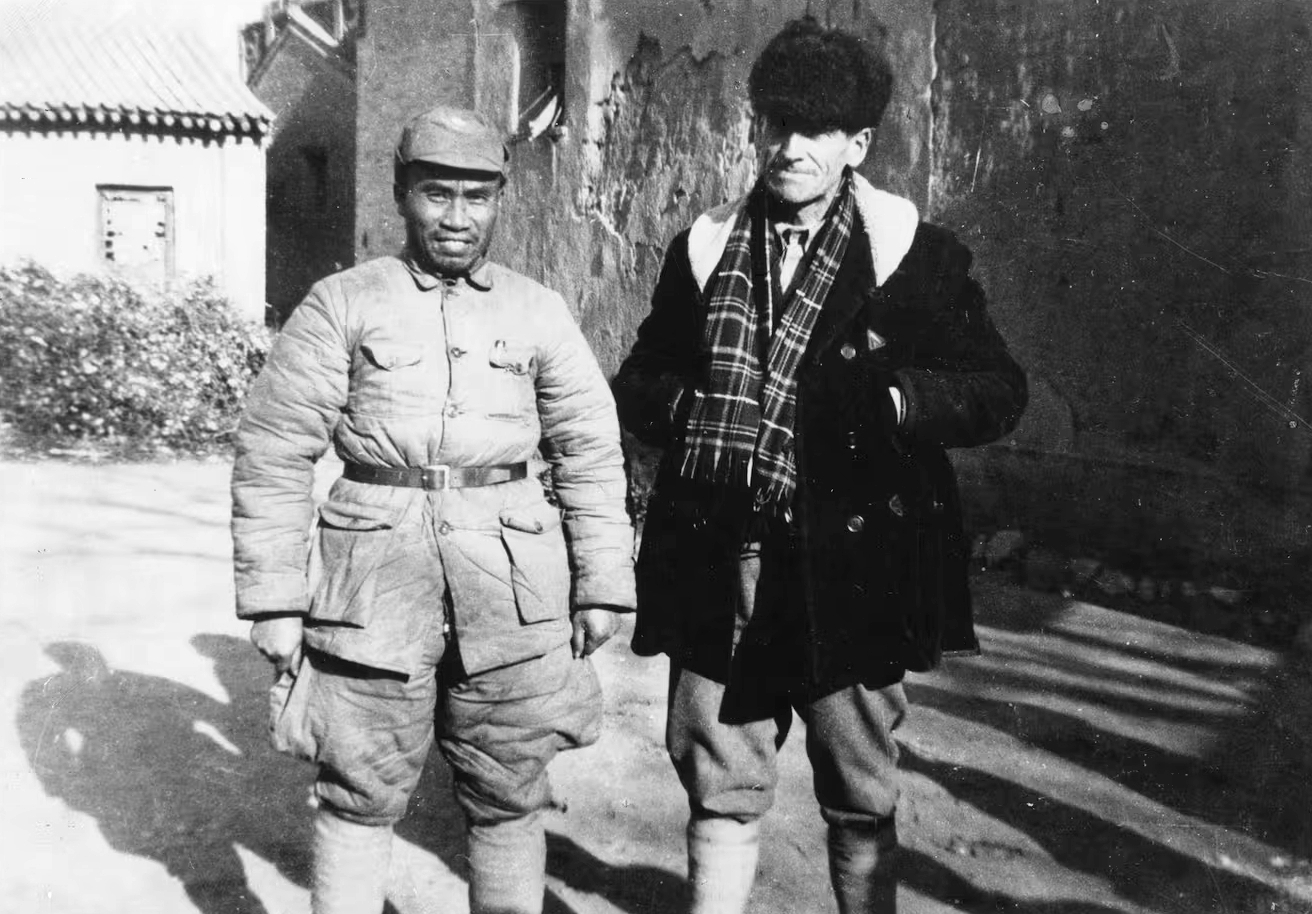
Carlson with Chinese Red Army Commander Zhu De at the Eighth Route Army's field headquarters in Shanxi province, December 1937

From 1933 until 1935, Carlson was again in China, first in Shanghai, then with the Legation Guard in Beijing. While in China, he studied the Chinese language and history. Promoted to captain upon his return to Marine Corps Base Quantico, he was able to devote time studying foreign affairs at George Washington University.

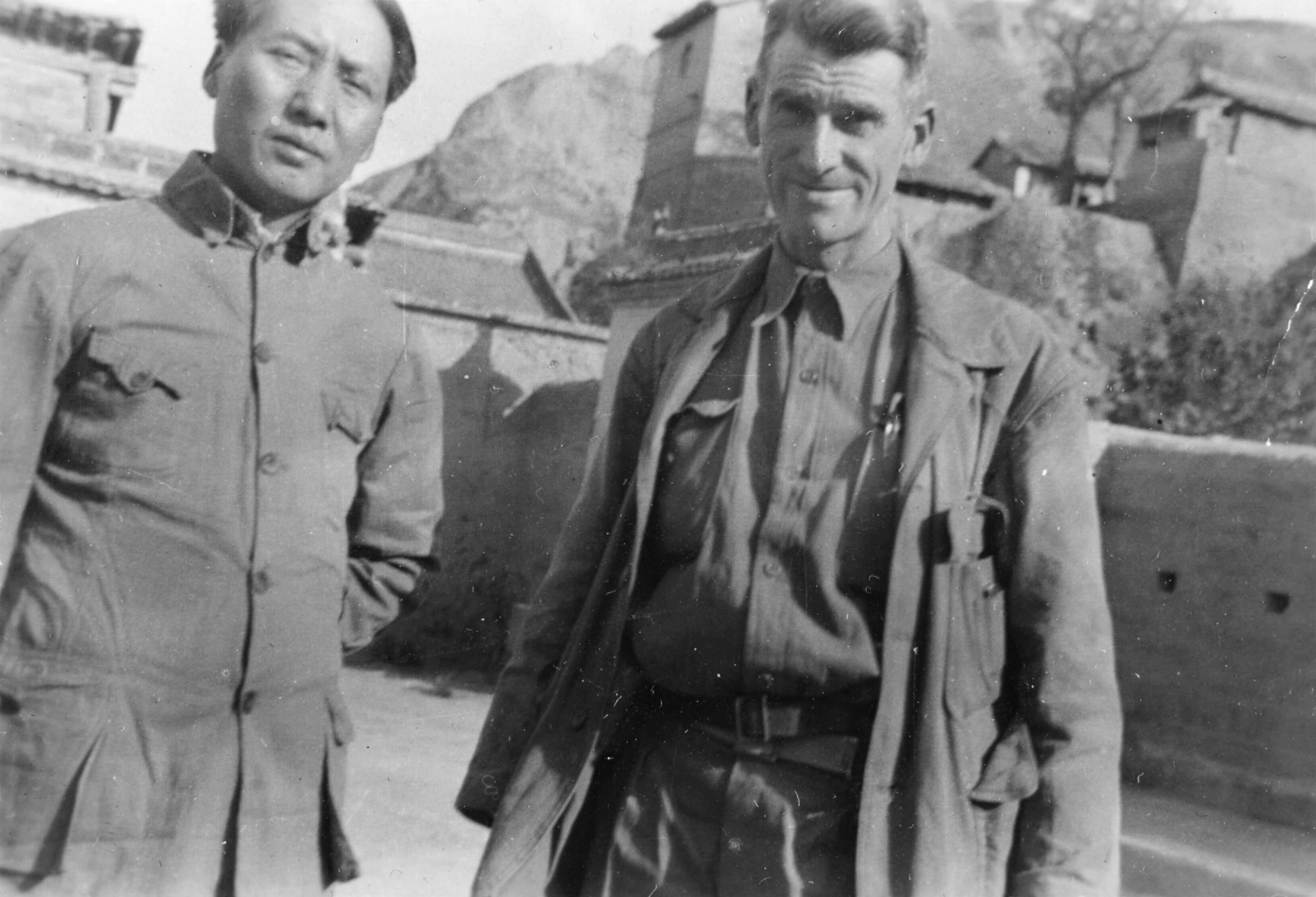
Carlson with Chinese Communist Party Chairman Mao Zedong c. 1937

He met Edgar Snow in China and read Snow's Red Star Over China. This encounter led him to visit the Chinese communist troop headquarters in northern China, where he met Chinese Communist leaders such as Mao Zedong, Zhou Enlai and Deng Xiaoping. Traveling thousands of miles through the interior of China with the communist guerrillas, often on foot and horseback over the most hazardous terrain, he lived under the same primitive conditions. He was impressed by the tactics used by Chinese Communist guerrillas to fight Japanese troops. Carlson adopted the phrase "gung ho" from Rewi Alley's Chinese Industrial Cooperatives. Carlson often had left-wing political views, prompting General David M. Shoup to say of him, "He may be red, but he's not yellow."

From 1937 until 1938, Carlson was again in Shanghai, witness to the Battle of Shanghai in the Second Sino-Japanese War, the Eighth Route Army in Xi'an, and the Chinese Communists' capital in Yan'an. Besides Edgar Snow, Carlson met Helen Foster Snow and Agnes Smedley during these journeys. Over an argument with Harvey Overesch, Carlson resigned his Marine Corps commission in Hankow. Returning to China under the auspices of the Chinese Industrial Cooperatives, after writing Twin Stars of China, Carlson found "The situation here is disappointing. Gone is all the vim and enthusiasm of the early months of the war. In their place is conflict, profiteering and apathy." In 1941, Thomas Holcomb offered Carlson a commission as a major in the Marine Corps Reserve.

=== World War II, "Carlson's Raiders" ===
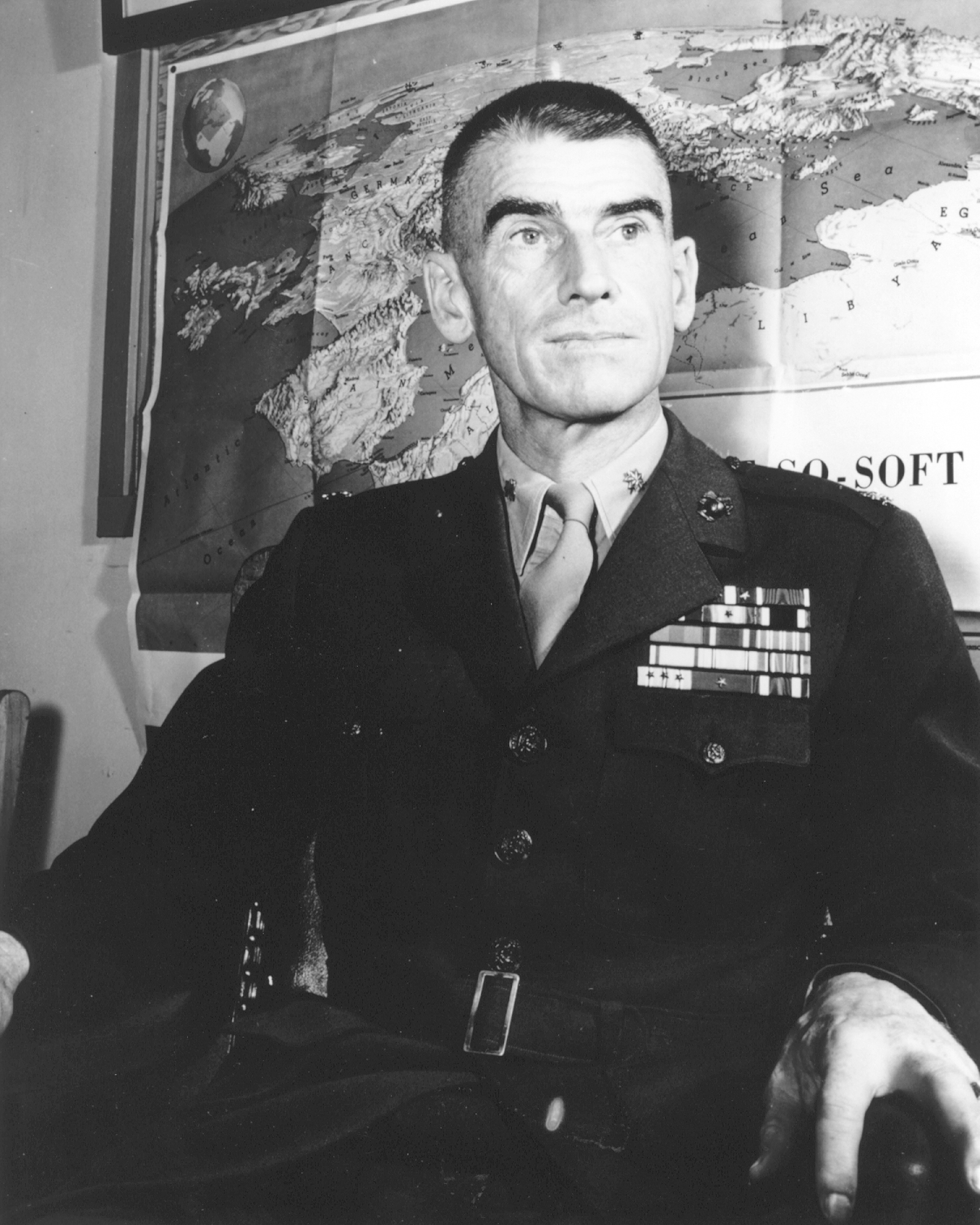
Lt. Col. Carlson c. 1941–1946

In 1942, he was placed in command of the Second Marine Raider Battalion with the rank of lieutenant colonel, a new combat organization whose creation he influenced. Because of his relationship with President Roosevelt and the president's son, Captain James Roosevelt, a Marine reserve captain who authored a letter to the Commandant of the Marine Corps proposing the creation of the Raiders, the Marine Corps authorized the creation of the Raiders despite misgivings about Carlson's philosophy.

In the United States military there was a sharp caste-system divide between officers and enlisted personnel, and even experienced noncommissioned officers were expected to be subservient to even the newest, greenest second lieutenant. Drawing on his time in China and his experience in having gone back and forth between officer and enlisted status in both the Army and the Marine Corps, and believing that this policy was not in the best interests of the service, Carlson radically reformed the raider battalion along much more egalitarian lines. Leaders were expected to serve the unit and the fighters they led, not to be served. Responsibility, not privilege, would be the keyword for battalion leadership when the Second Raiders formed up. Using an egalitarian and team-building approach, Carlson promulgated a new way for senior NCOs to mentor junior officers and work with the officers for the betterment of the unit. Even more controversial in concept, Carlson gave his men "ethical indoctrination," designed to "give (his men) conviction through persuasion," describing for each man what he was fighting for and why.

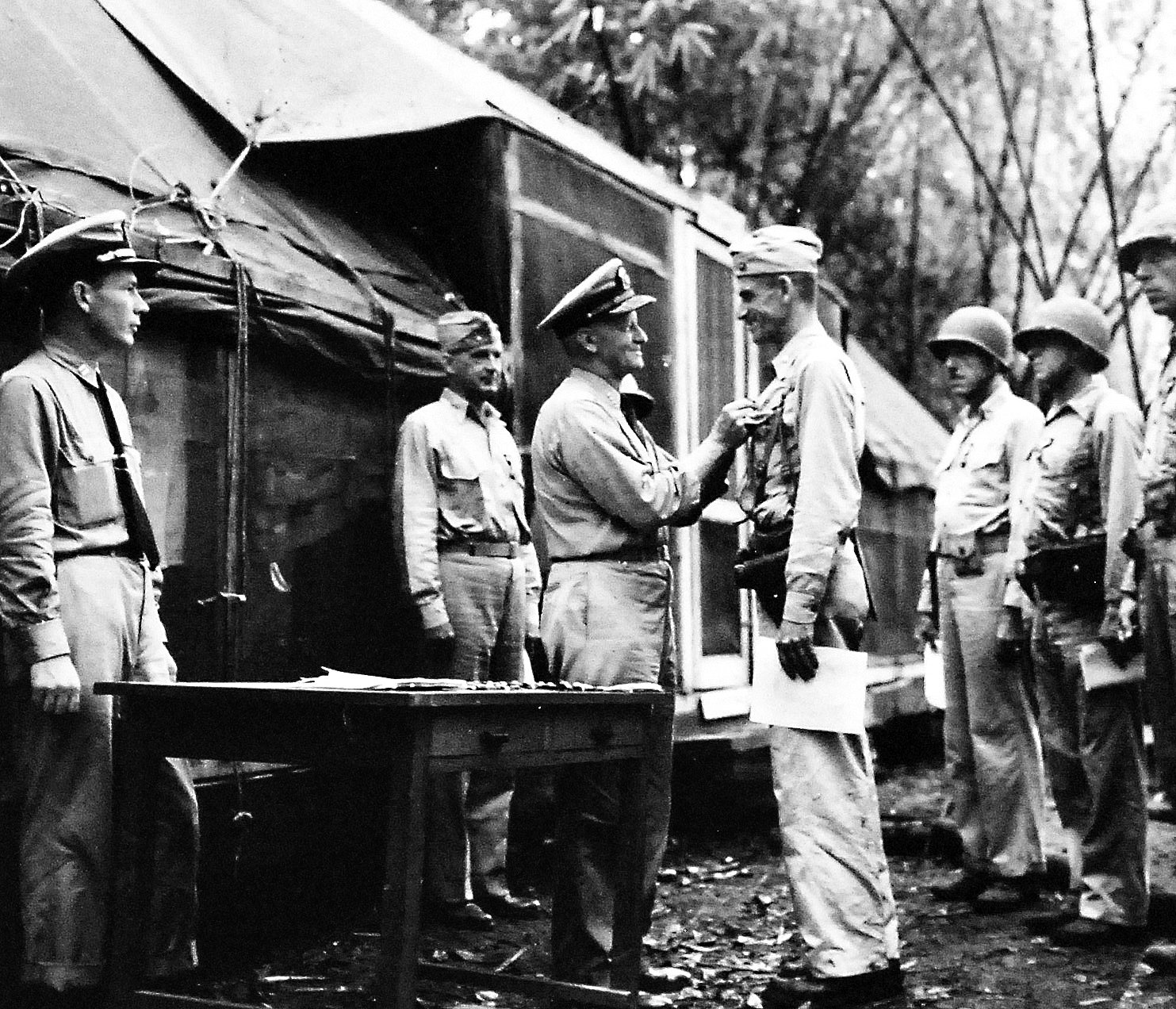
Lt. Col. Carlson is decorated by Admiral Chester W. Nimitz, September 30, 1942

Of more lasting importance to the Marine Corps, Carlson also changed the organization of his squads, eschewing an eight-man squad dictated by the Marines in favor of a 10-man squad composed of a squad leader and three 3-man "fireteams", each containing a BAR, a Thompson, and an M1 rifle.

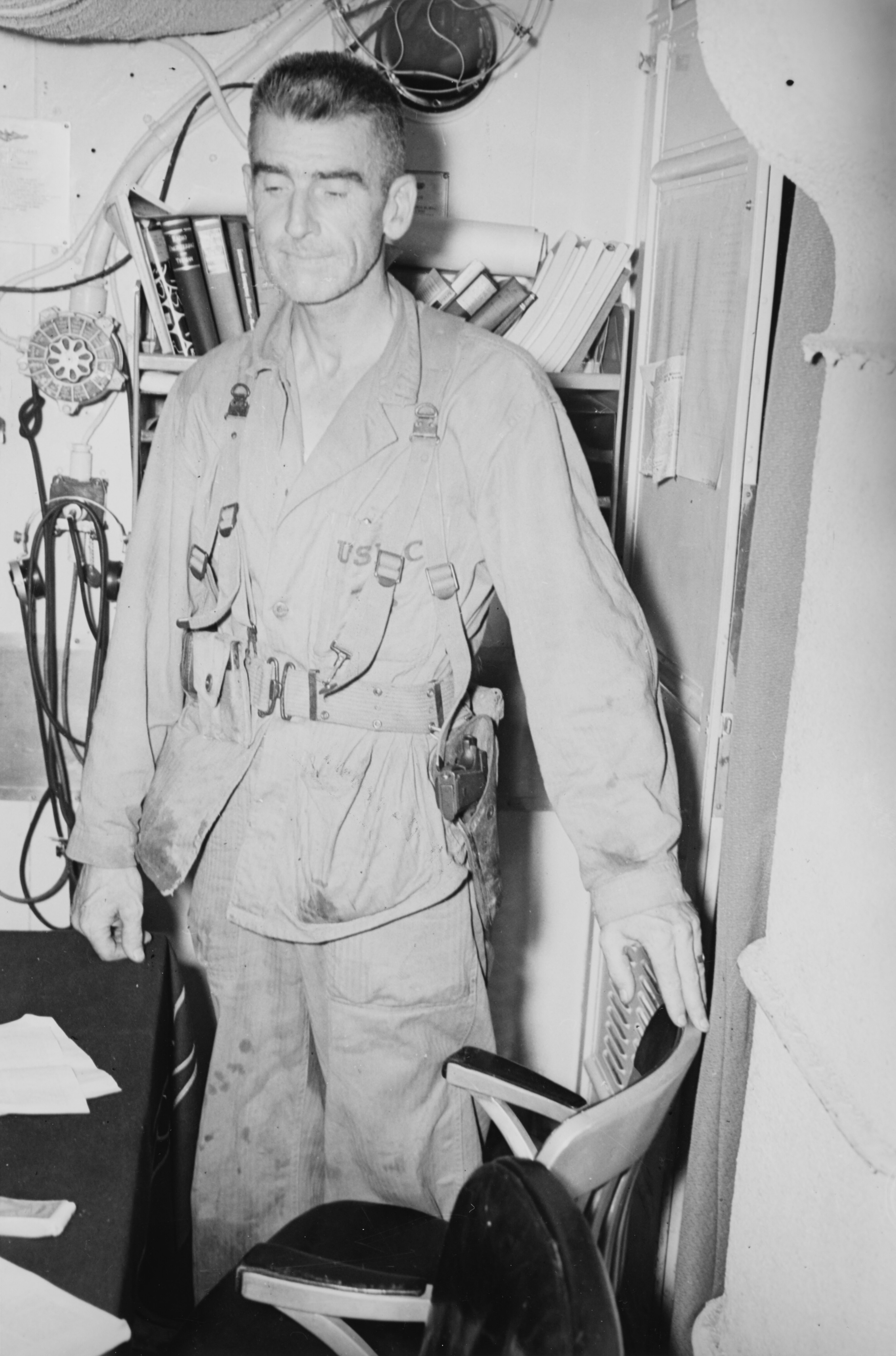
Lt. Col. Carlson after the Makin Island Raid

Carlson's leadership of the Second Raiders in the Makin Raid, August 17, 1942, earned him a second Navy Cross (5/16-inch gold star in lieu of second Navy Cross). He received a third Navy Cross (second 5/16-inch gold star in lieu of third Navy Cross) for extraordinary heroism and distinguished leadership on Guadalcanal in November and December 1942.

On March 15, 1943, the four raider battalions were placed under the control of the newly created 1st Raider Regiment, commanded by the former commander of the 3rd Raiders, Col. Harry B. Liversedge. A week later Carlson was relieved as commander of the 2nd Raiders by Lt. Col. Alan Shapley, an officer of much more orthodox thinking, and made executive officer of the 1st Raider Regiment. Within a month Shapley had reorganized the 2nd Raiders into a traditional organization, and Liversedge then standardized the organization of the four raider battalions along the lines of the 1st Raider Battalion, although all adopted the 3-fireteam squad-organization concept pioneered by Carlson, which was soon adopted by the Marine Corps as a whole.

=== Later service in the Pacific ===
Carlson was soon ordered back to the United States for medical treatment of malaria and jaundice, and served as a technical advisor to Walter Wanger's Gung Ho!: The Story of Carlson's Makin Island Raiders (released December 1943).

He subsequently returned to the Pacific campaign and participated in the Battle of Tarawa in November 1943, as an observer, and was cited for volunteering to carry vital information through enemy fire from an advanced post to division headquarters. During the Battle of Saipan in 1944, he was wounded while attempting to rescue a wounded enlisted radioman from a front-line observation post, and was awarded a second Purple Heart (5/16-inch gold star in lieu of second Purple Heart).

== Retirement and death ==
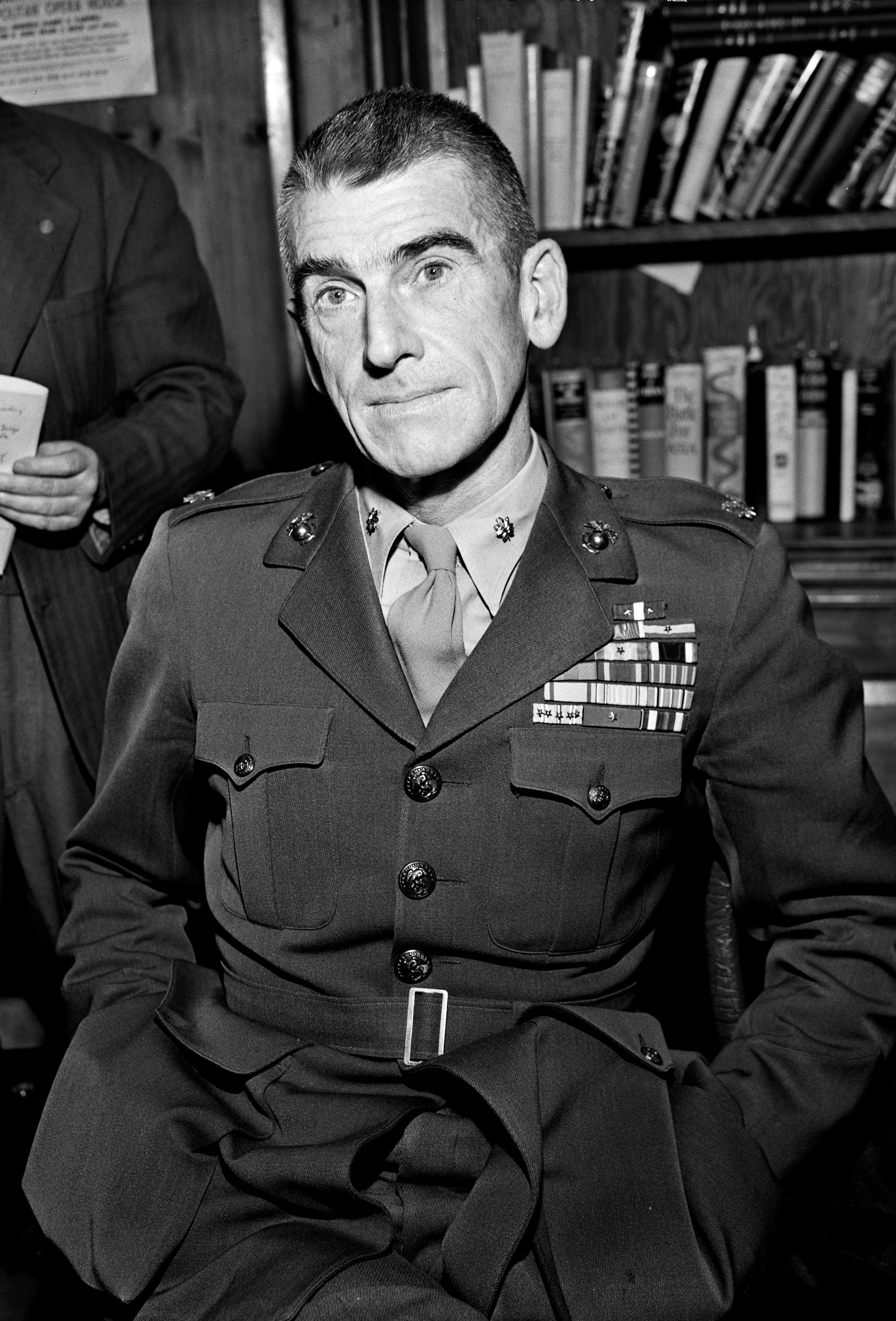
Carlson at a press conference where he praised the Chinese Eighth Route Army, March 11, 1944

Physical disability resulting from the wounds received on Saipan caused Carlson's retirement on July 1, 1946. He was advanced to the rank of brigadier general on the retired list at that time for having been specially commended for the performance of duty in actual combat.

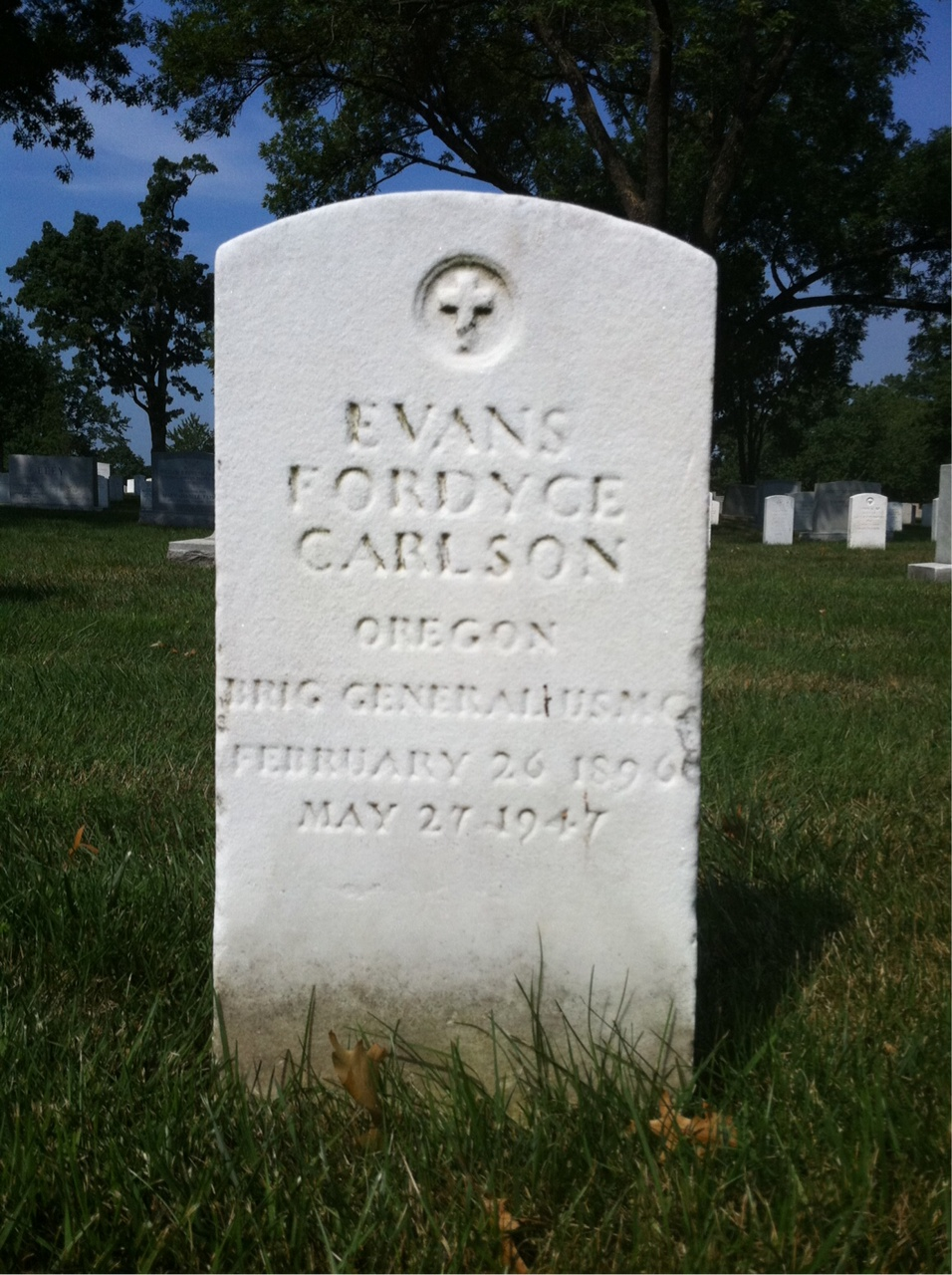
Grave at Arlington National Cemetery

On May 27, 1947, at age 51, Carlson died as the result of a cardiac ailment at Emanuel Hospital in Portland, Oregon. He had been living in Brightwood, Oregon, since his retirement. He was survived by his wife, Mrs. Peggy Tatum Carlson, and a son by a previous marriage, Evans C. Carlson.

General Carlson is buried in Arlington National Cemetery.

== Awards and decorations ==
General Carlson's awards include:

Navy Cross with two 5/16 gold stars | Legion of Merit
Purple Heart Medal with 5/16 gold star	Presidential Unit Citation (Navy) with three 3/16 bronze stars	Marine Corps Expeditionary Medal
Mexican Service Medal	World War I Victory Medal with France clasp	Yangtze Service Medal
Second Nicaraguan Campaign Medal	China Service Medal	American Defense Service Medal
American Campaign Medal	Asiatic-Pacific Campaign Medal with three 3/16 bronze stars	World War II Victory Medal
Italian Croce al Merito di Guerra	Nicaraguan Presidential Order of Merit with 5/16 gold star	Nicaraguan Medal of Distinction with 3/16 silver star

=== Navy Cross citations ===
Nicaragua (May 16, 1930 – May 1, 1931)

CARLSON, EVANS FORDYCE
First Lieutenant, U.S. Marine Corps
Guardia Nacional de Nicaragua
Date of Action: May 16, 1930 – May 1, 1931

The Navy Cross is presented to Evans Fordyce Carlson, First Lieutenant, U.S. Marine Corps, for extraordinary heroism while attached to the Guardia Nacional from May 16, 1930, to May 1, 1931. Upon joining the Guardia Nacional, First Lieutenant Carlson was assigned at Jalapa in the bandit area of Nueva Segovia. On July 8, 1930, he received a report that a group of one hundred bandits were looting the town of Portillo. He immediately left with a detachment of sixteen men to gain contact. Four of the men deserted en route but with the remaining twelve men he pushed on and overtook and gained contact with a group of forty bandits, completely routing them, killing two and wounding seven, without any casualties to his detachment. Arms, ammunition, equipment and clothing looted from the town of Portillo were recaptured. Lieutenant Carlson maintained his district in a most excellent manner and by his activities and well-directed operations kept it singularly free from banditry.

Makin Island, Raid (August 17–18, 1942)

CARLSON, EVANS FORDYCE
Lieutenant Colonel, U.S. Marine Corps (Reserve)
Commanding Officer, 2d Marine Raider Battalion
Date of Action: August 17–18, 1942

The Navy Cross is presented to Evans Fordyce Carlson, Lieutenant Colonel, U.S. Marine Corps (Reserve), for extraordinary heroism and distinguished service as Commanding Officer of the Second Marine Raider Battalion in action against Japanese forces on Makin Island, August 17–18, 1942. In the first operation of this type ever conducted by United States forces, Lieutenant Colonel Carlson personally directed his forces in the face of intense fire of enemy ground troops and aerial bombing barrage, inflicting great personnel and material damage on the enemy. In the withdrawal of his forces under adverse sea conditions, he displayed outstanding resourcefulness, initiative and resolute purpose in evacuating all wounded and disabled men. His high courage and excellent leadership throughout the engagement were in keeping with the finest traditions of the United States Naval Service.
SPOT AWARD, October 1942

Guadalcanal, Long Patrol (November 4 – December 4, 1942)

CARLSON, EVANS FORDYCE
Lieutenant Colonel, U.S. Marine Corps (Reserve)
Commanding Officer, 2d Marine Raider Battalion
Date of Action: November 4 – December 4, 1942

The Navy Cross is presented to Evans Fordyce Carlson, Lieutenant Colonel, U.S. Marine Corps (Reserve), for extraordinary heroism and courage as leader of the Second Marine Raider Battalion in action against enemy forces in the British Solomon Islands during the period from November 4 to December 4, 1942. In the face of most difficult conditions of tropical weather and heavy growth, Lieutenant Colonel Carlson led his men in a determined and aggressive search for threatening hostile forces, overcoming all opposition and completing their mission with small losses to our men while taking heavy toll of the enemy. His personal valor and inspiring fortitude reflect great credit upon Lieutenant Colonel Carlson, his command and the United States Naval Service.
SPOT AWARD, January 1943

== Works ==
Carlson wrote books about his third tour in China when he was attached to the Chinese 8th Route Army:

- Twin Stars of China, Dodd, Mead & Company, 1940.
- The Chinese army its organization and military efficiency, International Secretariat, Institute of Pacific Relations, 1939. (ASIN B00089LO5S)
- Evans F. Carlson on China at War, 1937–1941, China and U.S. Publication. (ASIN B0006F13D2)

== See also ==
- Marine Raiders
- Merritt Edson

== Sources ==
- Who's Who in Marine Corps History, History Division, United States Marine Corps. (URL accessed November 27, 2021)
- Evans F. Carlson, Brigadier General, United States Marine Corps, Arlington National Cemetery profile.
