= Raid on Makin Island =

U.S. raid against Japanese forces in the Pacific during World War II

- Part of the Gilbert and Marshall Islands campaign of the Pacific Theater (World War II)
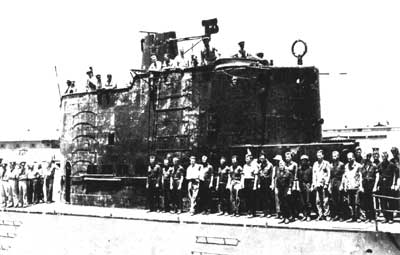
- U.S. Marines return to Pearl Harbor, Hawaii on board the American submarine Nautilus following the raid, 26 August 1942.
Date	August 17–18, 1942
Location	Makin Island, Pacific Ocean 3°09′N 172°50′E
Result	American victory

Belligerents
United States	Japan

Commanders and leaders
(United States) Chester W. Nimitz; (United States) Evans Carlson	(Empire of Japan) Kōsō Abe; (Empire of Japan) Kyuzaburō Kanemitsu †

Strength
211 troops (from the 2nd Marine Raider Battalion); 2 submarines	2 officers; 69 other ranks; 2 civilians attached; 13 aircraft; 3 small ships

Casualties and losses
19 killed; 17 wounded; 9 captured (later executed); 2 missing	46–160+ killed; 2 flying boats destroyed; 2 small boats sunk
- Location within Pacific Ocean

The raid on Makin Island was an attack by Marine Raiders of the United States Marine Corps on the Japanese-controlled Makin Island from August 17–18, 1942. Aims of the raid included destroying local installations, acquiring prisoners of war and military intelligence on the Gilbert Islands, and diverting Japanese attention and reinforcements from the Guadalcanal campaign and battle of Tulagi and Gavutu–Tanambogo. Only the first of these objectives were achieved, but the raid did boost morale and provide a test for Raider tactics.

== Preparations and organization ==
The raid was among the earliest American offensive ground combat operations of World War II. The force was drawn from the 2nd Raider Battalion and comprised a small battalion command group and two of the battalion's rifle companies. Because of space limitations aboard ship, each company embarked without one of its rifle sections. Headquarters Battalion, A Company, and 18 men from B Company—totalling 121 Marines—embarked aboard the submarine Argonaut, and the remainder of B Company—totalling 90 men—embarked aboard Nautilus. The raiding force was designated Task Group 7.15 (TG 7.15).

The Imperial Japanese Navy created the Makin Atoll Garrison in 1942. It was part of the Marshall Islands Garrison and was officially titled the 62nd Guard Unit. At the time of the Makin raid the total force opposing the American landing consisted of 71 armed personnel of the Japanese seaplane base led by Warrant Officer (Heisouchou) Kyuzaburo Kanemitsu of the Guard Unit equipped with light weapons. There were also four members of the seaplane tender base and three members of a meteorological unit. Two civilian personnel were attached to the Japanese forces as interpreters and civilian administrators.

== Raid ==
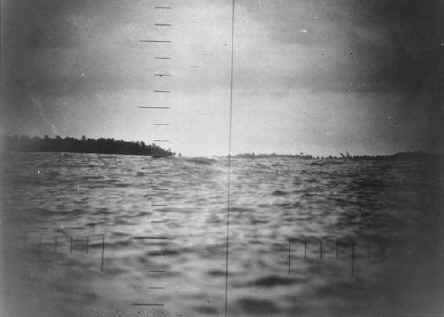
Makin as seen by USS Nautilus

On 17 August 1942 the Marine Raiders were launched in "Landing Craft Rubber Large" (LCRL) inflatable boats powered by small, 6 hp (4.5 kW) outboard motors shortly after midnight on 17 August. At 05:13, Companies A and B of the 2nd Raider Battalion, commanded by Lieutenant Colonel Evans Carlson, successfully landed on Makin. The landing had been very difficult because of rough seas, high surf, and the failure of many of the outboard motors. Carlson decided to land all his men on one beach, rather than two beaches as originally planned. At 05:15, Lieutenant Oscar Peatross and a 12-man squad landed on Makin. In the confusion of the landing, they did not get word of Carlson's decision to change plans and to land all the Raiders on one beach. Thus, Peatross and his men landed where they originally planned. It turned out to be a fortunate error. Undaunted by the lack of support, Peatross led his men inland.

At 07:00 with Company A leading, the Raiders advanced from the beach across the island to its north shore before attacking southwestward. Strong resistance from Japanese snipers and machine guns stalled the advance and inflicted casualties. The Japanese then launched two banzai charges, which were wiped out by the Raiders, thus killing most of the Japanese on the island. At 09:00 Peatross and his 12 men found themselves behind the Japanese, who were fighting the rest of the Raiders to the east. Peatross's unit killed eight Japanese and Kanemitsu, knocked out a machine gun, and destroyed the enemy radios, while suffering three dead and two wounded. Failing to contact Carlson, they withdrew to the submarines at dusk as planned.

At 13:30, 12 Japanese planes, including two flying boats, arrived over Makin. The flying boats, carrying reinforcements for the Japanese garrison, attempted to land in the lagoon but were met with machine gun, rifle and Boys anti-tank rifle fire from the Raiders. One plane crashed, and the other burst into flames. The remaining planes bombed and strafed but inflicted no American casualties.

== Evacuation ==
At 19:30 on 17 August the Raiders began to withdraw from the island using 18 rubber boats, many of which no longer had working outboard motors. Despite heavy surf, seven boats with 93 men made it to the subs. The attempt by most of the Raiders to reach the submarines failed. Despite significant effort, 11 of 18 boats were unable to breach the unexpectedly strong surf. Having lost most of their weapons and equipment, the exhausted survivors struggled back to the beach to link up with 20 fully armed men, who had been left on the island to cover their withdrawal. An exhausted and dispirited Carlson dispatched a note to the Japanese commander that offered to surrender, but the Japanese messenger was killed by other Marines, who were unaware of Carlson's plan.

At 09:00 on 18 August, the submarines sent a rescue boat to stretch rope from the ships to the shore that would allow the remaining Raiders' boats to be pulled out to sea. However, just as the operation began, Japanese planes arrived and attacked, sinking the rescue boat and attacking the submarines, which were forced to crash-dive and wait on the bottom the rest of the day. The submarines were undamaged. At 23:08, having managed to signal the submarines to meet his Raiders at the entrance to Makin Lagoon, Carlson had a team led by Lieutenant Charlie Lamb build a raft made up of three rubber boats and two native canoes powered by the two remaining outboard motors. Using that raft, 72 exhausted Raiders sailed 4 miles (6.4 km) from Makin to the mouth of the lagoon, where the submarines picked them up.

=== Casualties ===
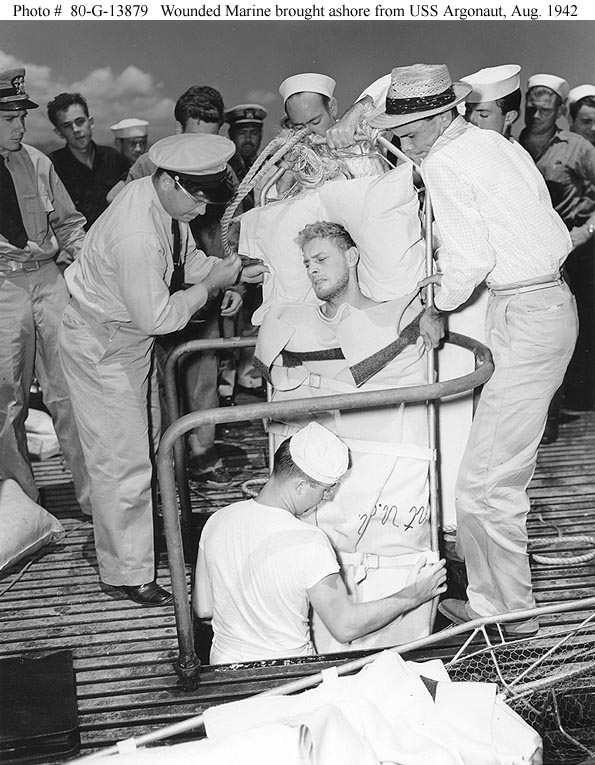
A Marine Raider, injured during the Makin operation, is lifted through a hatch on USS Argonaut to be taken ashore at Pearl Harbor, 26 August 1942.

USMC casualties were given as 18 killed in action and 12 missing in action. Of the 12 Marines missing in action, one was later identified among the 19 Marine Corps graves found on Makin Island. Of the remaining 11 Marines missing in action, 9 were inadvertently left behind or returned to the island during the night withdrawal. They were subsequently captured, moved to Kwajalein Atoll, and executed by Japanese forces. Admiral Abe Kōsō was subsequently tried and executed by the Allies for the murder of the nine Marines. The remaining two Marines missing in action were not accounted for.

Carlson reported that he had personally counted 83 Japanese bodies and estimated that 160 Japanese were killed based on reports from the Makin Island natives with whom he spoke. Additional Japanese personnel may have been killed in the destruction of two boats and two aircraft. Historian Samuel Eliot Morison states that 60 Japanese were killed in the sinking of one of the boats. Japanese records indicate 46 killed of all ranks (not including the purported large casualties Carlson reported for the boats he had sunk). This was confirmed when supporting Japanese forces returned to the island and found 27 Japanese survivors of the raid.

== Aftermath ==
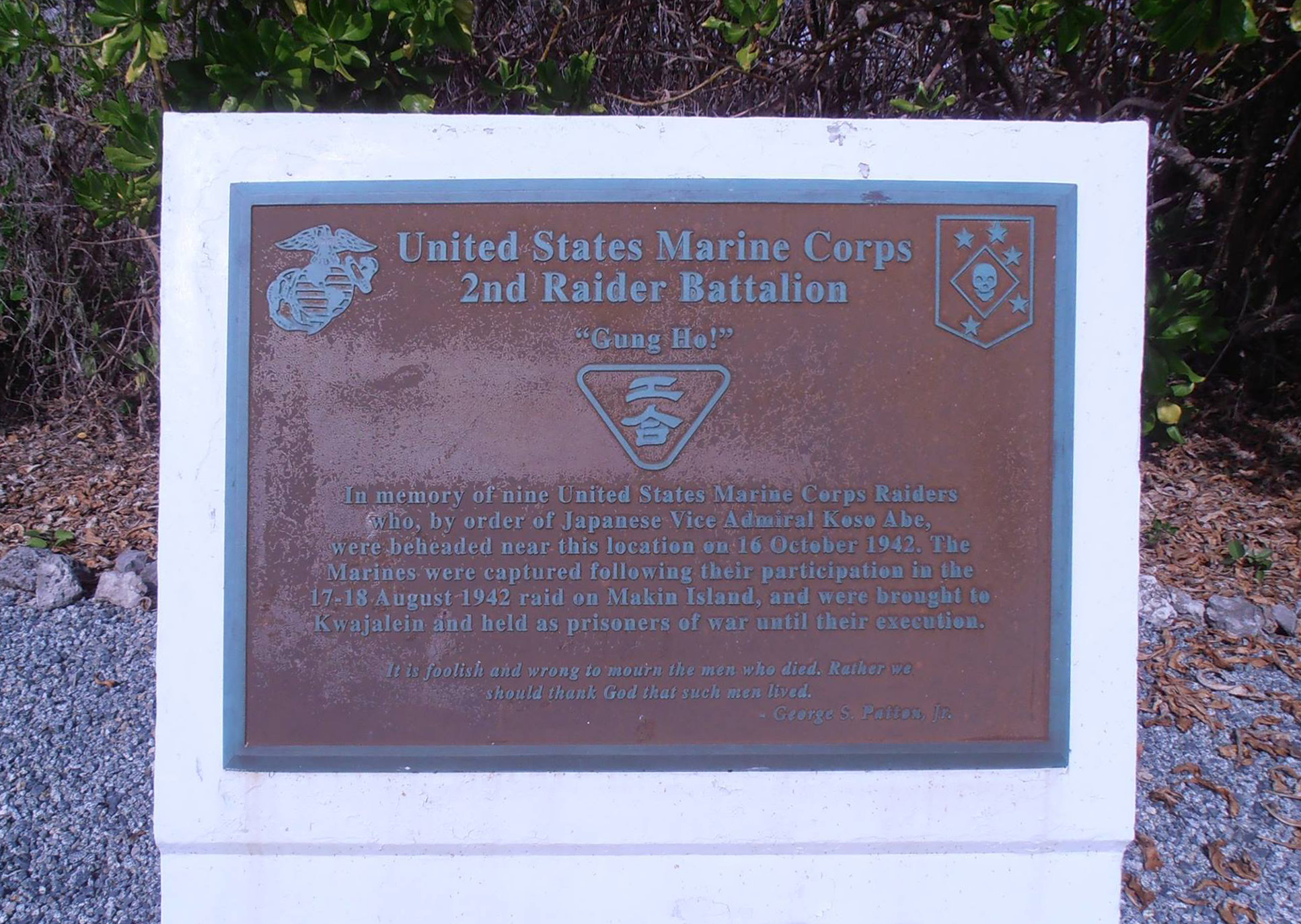
A plaque commemorating the Makin Island raid, located on the island of Kwajalein.

Although the Marine Raiders succeeded in killing over half of the Imperial Japanese garrison on the island, the raid failed to meet its other material objectives. No Japanese prisoners were taken, and no meaningful intelligence was collected. Also, no significant Japanese forces were diverted from the Solomon Islands area. In fact, because the vulnerabilities to their garrisons in the Gilbert Islands were highlighted by the raid, the Japanese strengthened their fortifications and defensive preparations on the islands in the central Pacific. As a result, the objective to dissipate Japanese forces may have had the unintended consequence of causing heavier losses for American forces during the battles of the Gilbert and Marshall Islands campaigns. However, the raid did succeed in its objectives of boosting morale and testing Raider tactics.

The 1943 American propaganda film Gung Ho! was loosely based on the raid, and Evans Carlson was employed as a technical advisor during production.

In 2000, 58 years after the raid, the remains of nineteen Marines were found on Makin Island through bioarchaeological excavation and recovery then sent to the Defense Department's Central Identification Laboratory in Hawaii where they were identified. Six of these Marines were returned to their families for private burial ceremonies. The remaining thirteen were buried with full honors at Arlington National Cemetery after a funeral service at Fort Myer Chapel at which Commandant James L. Jones spoke. The remaining eleven Marines have not yet been located.

Dallas H. Cook (posthumously) and James Roosevelt each received a Navy Cross citation for their efforts during the raid, and Clyde A. Thomason posthumously received a Medal of Honor. Thomason was the first enlisted Marine to receive the Medal of Honor during World War II.

== Bibliography ==
- Hough, Frank O.; Verle E. Ludwig; Henry I. Shaw Jr (1958). Pearl Harbor To Guadalcanal, History Of The Marine Corps Operations In World War II, Volume I. Washington, D.C.: United States Marine Corps.
- Morison, Samuel Eliot (2001) [1949]. Coral Sea, Midway and Submarine Actions, May 1942 – August 1942, vol. 4 of History of United States Naval Operations in World War II. Champaign, Illinois: University of Illinois Press. ISBN 978-0-252-06995-6.
- Morison, Samuel Eliot (1961). Aleutians, Gilberts and Marshalls, June 1942 – April 1944, vol. 7 of History of United States Naval Operations in World War II. Boston: Little, Brown and Company. ASIN B0007FBB8I.
- Rottman, Gordon (2005). Duncan Anderson (ed.). US Special Warfare Units in the Pacific Theatre 1941–45. Oxford: Osprey. ISBN 1-84176-707-7.
- Rottman, Gordon L. (2014). Carlson's Marine Raiders; Makin Island 1942. Oxford: Osprey Raid Series #44. ISBN 978-1-4728-0327-6.
- Peatross, Oscar F. (1995). John P. McCarthy; John Clayborne (eds.). Bless 'em All: The Raider Marines of World War II. Review. ISBN 0-9652325-0-6.
- Smith, George W. (2003). Carlson's Raid: The Daring Marine Assault on Makin. Berkley Trade. ISBN 978-0-425-19019-7. Review of this book:
- Wiles, W. Emerson "Tripp" (2007). Forgotten Raiders of '42: The Fate of the Marines Left Behind on Makin. Potomac Books. ISBN 978-1-59797-055-6.
- Young, Howard. "Carlson's Raiders on Makin, 17–18 August 1942", Marine Corps Gazette 87(8): August 31, 2003.
