= Marine Raiders =

USMC special operations unit

- Marine Raider insignia
- Active: 1942–1944; 2006–present
- Country: United States of America
- Branch: United States Marine Corps
- Role: Amphibious warfare Direct action Raiding; Special operations
- Size: 800
- Garrison/HQ: Marine Corps Base Camp Lejeune
- Motto: "Gung-ho!" (Carlson's Raiders)
- Engagements: World War II: Guadalcanal campaign; Battle of Tulagi and Gavutu–Tanambogo; Battle of Edson's Ridge; Battle for Henderson Field; Carlson's Patrol; Raid on Makin Island; New Georgia Campaign; Battle of Enogai; Battle of Bairoko; Bougainville Campaign

Commanders
- Notable commanders: Merritt A. Edson; Evans Carlson; Samuel B. Griffith

The Marine Raiders are special operations forces originally established by the United States Marine Corps during World War II to conduct amphibious light infantry warfare.

Despite the original intent for Raiders to serve in a special operations capacity, most combat operations saw the Raiders employed as conventional infantry. This, combined with the resentment within the rest of the Marine Corps that the Raiders were an "elite force within an elite force", led to the original Raider units being disbanded.

Four Raider battalions served operationally but all were disbanded on 8 January 1944, when the Marine Corps made the doctrinal decision that the Raiders had outlived their original mission, while also needing personnel to adequately fill the newly created 4th and 5th Marine divisions – partially supplied by disbanding numerous special purpose Marine regiments and battalions that had been created during WWII. The changing nature of the war in the Pacific, with many large-scale amphibious assaults to come against well-defended islands, negated the requirements for small light units that could strike deep into enemy territory.

On 1 February 1944, the 1st Raider Regiment was redesignated the 4th Marine Regiment, thus assuming the lineage of the regiment that had fought throughout the Philippines campaign (1941–1942), finally being utterly destroyed in the May 1942 Battle of Corregidor. The 1st, 3rd, and 4th Raider Battalions became respectively the 1st, 3rd, and 2nd Battalions of the 4th Marines. The 2nd Raider Battalion filled out the regimental weapons company. Personnel in the Raider Training Center transferred to the newly formed 5th Marine Division. Leavened with new men, the 4th Marines went on to earn additional distinctions in the assaults on Guam and Okinawa. At the close of the war, the regiment joined the occupation forces in Japan and participated in the release of the remaining members of the old 4th Marines from POW camps.

In 2014, the Marine Special Operations Regiment, serving under the United States Marine Corps Forces Special Operations Command (MARSOC), was renamed the Marine Raider Regiment. This change was implemented as homage to the World War II Raiders. Marine special operators of the Marine Raider Regiment are once again called "Marine Raiders".

== History ==
=== Provisional Rubber Boat Companies ===
One of the deficiencies of the Fleet Marine Force was a lack of fast transport ships that could keep up with a Naval fleet. Until fast attack transports entered the Navy, either the fleet would have to keep its speed down to the speed of the transport ships, or the fleet would have to split in two components; neither option was desirable. With the start of World War II in 1939, a group was formed to come up with a solution that could be rapidly implemented. The group found a large number of destroyers built for the First World War that were in the mothball fleet. These destroyers had four boilers and four smoke stacks and were fast enough to keep up with the fleet. The group discovered that by removing two boilers and smoke stacks room could be found to quarter a company of 130 Marines who would be landed by inflatable boats. These high speed transports were named APDs by the Navy. The APDs later had four Higgins boats attached to them.

In February 1941 one company ("A", "E" and "I" respectively) from each battalion of the recently formed 7th Marines were designated "Provisional Rubber Boat Companies" and participated in a Fleet Landing Exercises (FLEX-7) in 1941. After the exercise, General Holland Smith assigned the APDs and rubber boat function to the 1st Battalion 5th Marines.

=== Creation ===
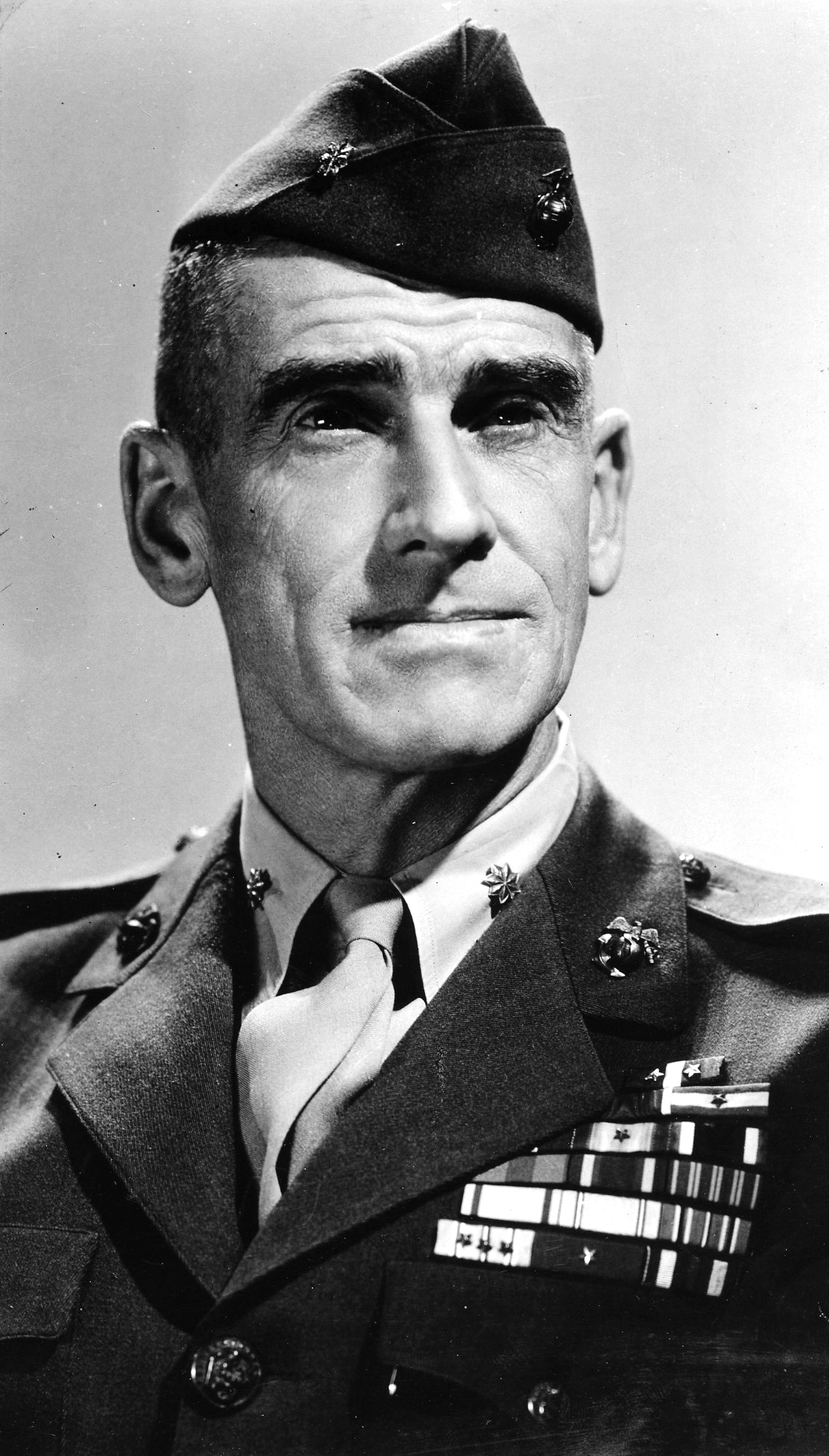
Lt. Col. Evans F. Carlson

With America thrust into the war, President Franklin D. Roosevelt became interested in creating an American counterpart to the British Commandos and the Marine Corps was the natural place for this organization. Indeed, the commanding general of the 2nd Marine Division initially proposed the name "Marine Commandos". The Commandant of the Marine Corps, Major General Thomas Holcomb, was of the opinion, however, that "the term 'Marine' is sufficient to indicate a man ready for duty at any time, and the injection of a special name, such as 'Commando,' would be undesirable and superfluous." General Holcomb redesignated the 1st Battalion 5th Marines as the "1st Separate Battalion" and created the 2nd Separate Battalion to be commanded by Carlson in response to pressure from the President.

The debate over the creation of these elite units came to a climax when the new commander of the Pacific Fleet, Admiral Chester Nimitz, requested "commando units" for raids against lightly defended Japanese-held islands. The commandant selected the term "Raiders" and created two battalions. The 1st Raider Battalion was activated on 16 February 1942, followed by the 2nd Raider Battalion on 19 February. Carlson was given a promotion to Lieutenant Colonel and placed in command of the 2nd Raiders, and Lt. Col. (later, Major General) Merritt A. "Red Mike" Edson, command of the 1st.

The Raiders were created by an order from President Roosevelt, acting on proposals from Colonel William J. Donovan and Major Evans F. Carlson. Carlson had been a soldier in the Punitive Expedition to capture Pancho Villa in Mexico and World War I, became a Marine officer during the American occupation of Nicaragua, and served as an Intelligence Officer of the 4th Marines in China. He had seen the tactics and strategy of Communist Chinese irregulars, Zhū Dé and the Eighth Route Army in particular, as they fought the occupying Japanese and became enthralled with their version of guerrilla warfare. In 1933 Carlson had commanded the Marine Detachment at the Warm Springs, Georgia vacation retreat of President Roosevelt, where he formed a close friendship with both Franklin D. Roosevelt and his son James. Carlson resigned from the Marines to speak to American businessmen to warn them against providing materials to Japan. Carlson rejoined the Marines in April 1941, gaining a commission from the Commandant as a reserve major. Carlson still had the President's ear as well as FDR's son James Roosevelt, who was now a Marine Captain and was his friend and protégé.

The Raiders were given the best of the Marines' equipment, and were handpicked from available volunteers. The two units approached their common mission from different directions. Carlson used egalitarian and team-building methods: he treated officers and enlisted men with minimum regard to rank as leaders and fighters, gave his men "ethical indoctrination," describing for each man what he was fighting for and why, and used the Chinese phrase "Gung-ho!" as a motivational slogan which he learned from the Communist forces during his years in China. He also eschewed standard Marine Corps organization, forming six rifle companies of two platoons each, and innovating 3-man "fire teams" as its basic unit. Edson's battalion, however, more closely followed standard Marine Corps doctrine in training, organization, and discipline.

=== Combat in the Central Pacific and Solomons ===
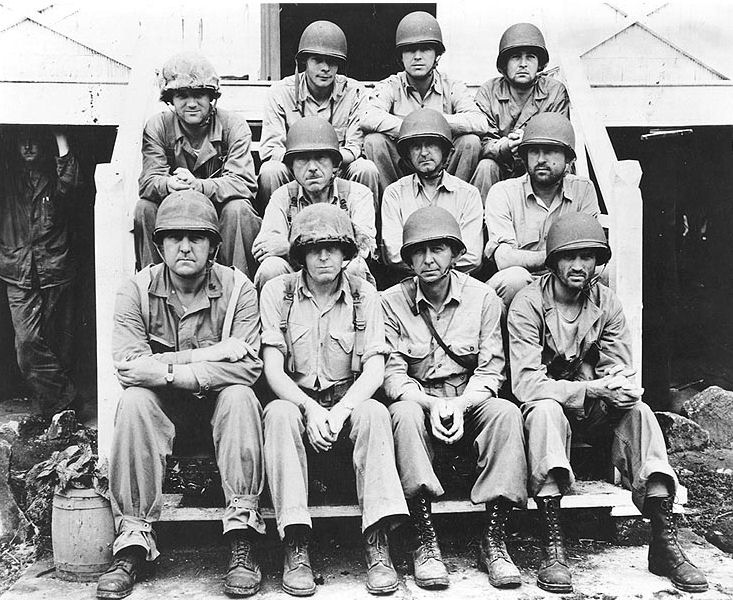
Marine officers on Tulagi. Lt. Col. Edson is second from left in front row.

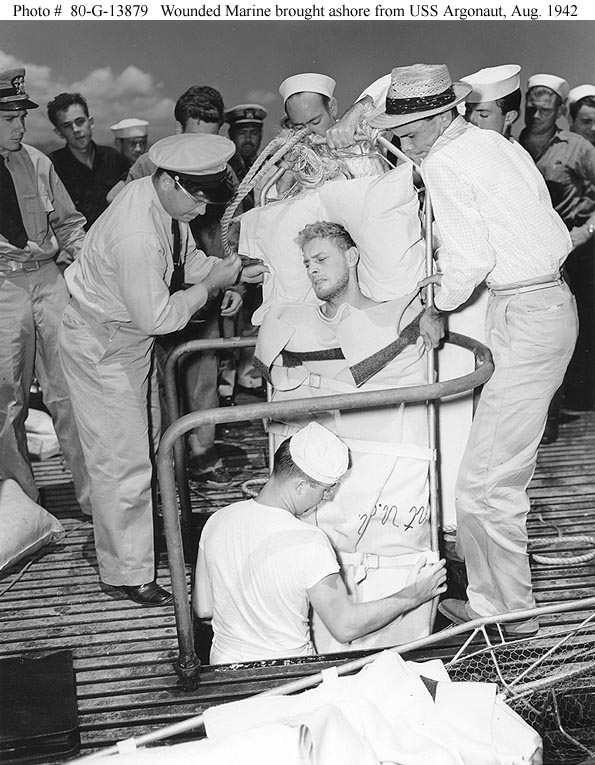
A Marine Raider, injured during the Makin operation, is lifted through a hatch on USS Argonaut to be taken ashore at Pearl Harbor, 26 August 1942.

Both Raider battalions were put into action at roughly the same time. On 7 August 1942, Edson's 1st Raider Battalion, assigned to the 1st Marine Division, landed on Tulagi in the British Solomon Islands Protectorate as the opening phase of the Guadalcanal campaign. After the capture of Tulagi, the Raiders were moved to Guadalcanal to defend Henderson Field. One of their most notable engagements was the "Battle of Edson's Ridge", where the 1st Raiders, remnants of the 1st Parachute Battalion, and the 2nd Battalion 5th Marines scored a major defensive victory over Imperial Japanese Army forces on the night of 13–14 September. Out of the action both Edson and Major Kenneth D. Bailey were awarded the Medal of Honor, the latter posthumously. The Marine Raiders battledress was the M1942 Frog Skin pattern. In 1942, the Marine Raiders were the first unit issued with the M1942 Frog Skin pattern, which was reversible with a five-colour jungle pattern on one side and a three-colour beach pattern on the other side.

Carlson's 2nd Raider Battalion boarded the submarines Nautilus (SS-168, Cdr William H. Brockman, Jr.) and Argonaut (APS-1, Cdr John R. "Jack" Pierce) and raided Makin Island on 17–18 August. During the raid, Sergeant Clyde A. Thomason was posthumously awarded the Medal of Honor and was the first Marine recipient of this honor during World War II. Unfortunately, nine men were unintentionally left on the island when the Raiders returned to the submarines. These men were captured and later beheaded at Kwajalein.

After the Battle of Savo Island, 1400 men in various support units of the 2nd Marine Regiment who had not yet landed on Tulagi were returned to Espiritu Santo after the transports they were on were withdrawn from the area. Deeming them "idle Marines", Admiral Richmond K. Turner decided to form them into a "2nd Provisional Raider Battalion" without consulting the Commandant of the Marine Corps. The unit was ordered created on 29 August 1942 but the order was superseded on 28 September 1942 by theater commander Admiral Robert L. Ghormley. Admiral Turner believed that regimental or larger sized Marine units were not suitable for Marine amphibious forces and desired that all Marine battalions be re-formed as Raider battalions, which may have influenced the Marine Corps to take a dim view of the entire Raider concept.

In the fall of 1942, two additional Raider battalions were created; the 3rd Raiders in Samoa, commanded by Lt. Col. Harry B. Liversedge, and the 4th Raiders at Camp Pendleton, California, commanded by now-Lt. Col. James Roosevelt. These battalions distinguished themselves in heavy combat alongside the 1st and 2d Raiders in the 1943 campaigns in the upper Solomons. On 15 March 1943, the four battalions were organized as the 1st Marine Raider Regiment at Espiritu Santo, with Liversedge as commander and Carlson as executive officer. Lt. Col. Alan Shapley was named commander of the 2nd Raiders a week later and immediately returned it to a standard organization.

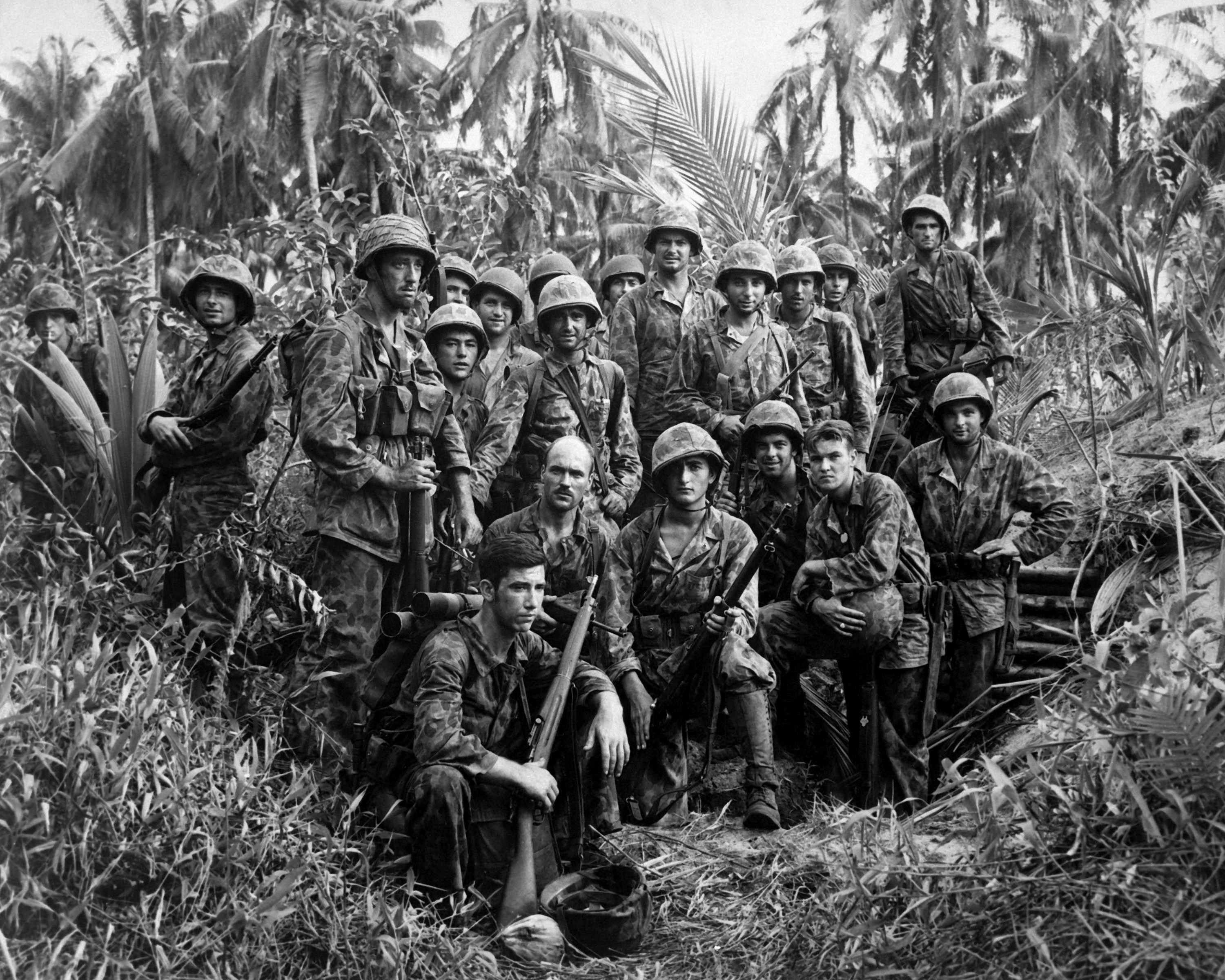
Marine Raiders gathered in front of a Japanese dugout on Bougainville.

The 1st Raider Regiment enforced a common organization among the battalions. Each had a weapons company, and four rifle companies composed of three rifle platoons and a weapons platoon. The result reflected a mixture of Edson's and Carlson's ideas. Carlson's 3-man fire team and 10-man squad organizations were adopted, first by the Raiders and then by the entire Marine Corps. Edson contributed the concept of a highly trained, lightly equipped force using conventional tactics to accomplish special missions or to fill in for a line battalion.

During the New Georgia Campaign, the 1st Marine Raider Regiment was task organized for a new mission with the 1st and 4th Raiders, and two attached battalions of the 37th Infantry Division, commanded by Liversedge. At the same time, the 2nd and 3rd Raider Battalions were temporarily attached to the 2nd Marine Raider Regiment (Provisional) under Shapley, for the invasion of Bougainville, the final combat action of the Raiders before their dissolution. PFC Henry Gurke of the 3rd Raider Battalion was awarded the Medal of Honor for actions of 6 November 1943, on Bougainville.

In December 1943 command of the 1st Raider Regiment passed to Lieutenant Colonel Samuel D. Puller. The regiment left New Caledonia on 21 January and landed on Guadalcanal three days later. The provisional 2d Raider Regiment disbanded and rejoined into the 1st, with the senior Shapley in command and Puller the executive officer.

=== Deactivation ===
In early 1944 the Marine Corps had four divisions, with two more being formed. Even with nearly a half million Marines in service, the Corps had insufficient manpower to allocate to the new divisions, because of large numbers of men assigned to defense, parachute, raider, barrage balloon, amphibious tractor and other specialized units. With no further expansion of the Corps planned, the only way to add manpower to the new divisions was to obtain it from existing organizations.

The anticipated need for commando-type units had not materialized, and the development of the amphibious tractor and improved fire support had ended the need for light assault units. The Raiders had generally performed the same missions as line infantry battalions, either wasting their training and skills, or exposing the lightly armed Raiders to excessive casualties. There was also institutional opposition to the existence of an elite force within the Corps. Two senior officers who had been opposed to the Raiders on this basis advanced to positions where they could abolish the units. On 1 January 1944, Gen. Alexander Vandegrift became Commandant of the Marine Corps, and Gen. Gerald C. Thomas became the Director of Plans and Policies.

The previous Director of Plans and Policies had already proposed to disband the Raiders and the Paramarines as "handpicked outfits ... detrimental to morale of other troops." Admiral Ernest King, Chief of Naval Operations, concurred in the proposal, and Vandegrift ordered the change on 8 January 1944. Manpower from the deleted units and their stateside training establishments were redirected to the new divisions, and supply requirements were simplified by the increased uniformity. On 1 February 1944, the 1st Raider Regiment was redesignated the 4th Marine Regiment, and eventually became part of the 6th Marine Division. The 1st, 4th, and 3d Raider Battalions became respectively the 1st, 2d, and 3d Battalions, 4th Marines. The 2nd Raider Battalion became the regimental weapons company, lacking the manpower to form an entire Battalion after the costly fighting in the Solomons. Personnel of the Raider Training Battalion at Camp Pendleton transferred to the 5th Marine Division. Many of the men who were formerly assigned to Raider units went on to serve with distinction during 1944 and 1945. For example, Michael Strank, one of the six men in the iconic photograph of the flag raising at Iwo Jima was a former Raider.

During the war, a total of 8,078 men, including 7,710 Marines and 368 sailors, were assigned to Raider units. Raiders received a total of seven Medals of Honor and 136 Navy Crosses.

=== Post World War II ===
MCSOCOM Detachment One insignia

According to the Marine Corps Times, the 20 June 2003 activation of the Marine Corps Forces Special Operations Command, which began with Detachment One, paid homage to the Marine Raiders. The Detachment's insignia, designed by Gunnery Sergeant Anthony Siciliano, incorporated the Raiders' famous knife, the United States Marine Raider stiletto, and the Raiders' insignia as a tribute and link to the famed battalions, which existed for only two years after their 1942 inception. MCSOCOM Detachment One served as a three year proof of concept to validate the Marine's capability as a special operations force. Det-1 deployed to Iraq in 2004 as Task Unit Raider under the Command of Naval Special Warfare Task Group One. The extraordinary success of the Det-1 Marines led to the establishment of MARSOC in 2006.

=== Revival ===
On 6 August 2014, Marine Commandant James F. Amos announced at a MARSOC change of command ceremony that all units within the parent command would undergo a name change. For example, the 1st Marine Special Operations Battalion would now be known as the 1st Marine Raider Battalion.

While the critical skills operators within Marine Special Operations Command (MARSOC) have the title of Marine Raider, the Raider lineage can be traced through the 4th Marine Regiment (as mentioned above) and the Marine reconnaissance battalions. The 1st and 2nd Force Reconnaissance Companies provided the initial personnel when MARSOC was created.

== Commanding officers ==
List of commanding officers of all Raider units, as listed on the official website.

1st Marine Raider Battalion

- Lt. Col./Col. Merritt A. Edson (February–May, July–September 1942)
- Maj./Lt. Col. Samuel B. Griffith (May–July 1942, January–September 1943)
- Maj. Ira J. Irwin (September 1942 – January 1943)
- Maj. George W. Herring (September–October 1943)
- Maj. Charles L. Banks (October 1943 – February 1944)

2nd Marine Raider Battalion

- Lt. Col. Evans Carlson (February 1942 – March 1943)
- Lt. Col. Alan Shapley (March–August 1943)
- Lt. Col. Joseph P. McCaffery (September–November 1943)
- Maj. Richard T. Washburn (November 1943 – January 1944)

3rd Marine Raider Battalion

- Lt Col. Harry B. Liversedge (September 1942 – March 1943)
- Lt. Col. Samuel S. Yeaton (March–June 1943)
- Lt. Col. Fred D. Beans (June 1943 – January 1944)

4th Marine Raider Battalion

- Lt. Col. James Roosevelt (October 1942 – April 1943)
- Maj. James R. Clark (April–May 1943)
- Lt. Col. Michael S. Currin (May–September 1943)
- Maj. Robert H. Thomas (September 1943 – February 1944)

1st Marine Raider Regiment

- Col. Harry B. Liversedge (March–December 1943)
- Lt. Col. Samuel D. Puller (December 1943 – January 1944)
- Lt. Col. Alan Shapley (January–February 1944)

2nd Marine Raider Regiment

- Lt. Col. Alan Shapley (September 1943 – January 1944)

== Marine Raider Medal of Honor recipients ==
List of the nine Medal of Honor recipients, six of them posthumously ( †), who served in Raider units during World War II, as listed on the official website.

- Maj. Kenneth D. Bailey (1910–1942) †, commanding officer of C Company, 1st Raider Battalion
- Cpl. Richard E. Bush (1924–2004), 1st Battalion 4th Marines (formerly served in 1st Raider Battalion)
- Lt. Col. Justice M. Chambers (1908–1982), commanding officer of 3rd Battalion 25th Marines (formerly served in 1st Raider Battalion)
- Col. Merritt A. Edson (1897–1955), commanding officer of 1st Raider Battalion
- PFC. Henry Gurke (1922–1943) †, 3rd Raider Battalion
- Sgt. Clyde A. Thomason (1914–1942) †, 2nd Raider Battalion
- GySgt. William G. Walsh (1922–1945) †, 3rd Battalion 27th Marines (formerly served in 2nd Raider Battalion)
- 1st. Lt. Jack Lummus (1915–1945) †, 2nd Battalion 27th Marines
- Cpl. Mitchell Red Cloud Jr. (1925–1950) †, 19th Infantry Regiment 24th Infantry Division (formerly served in 2nd Raider Battalion)

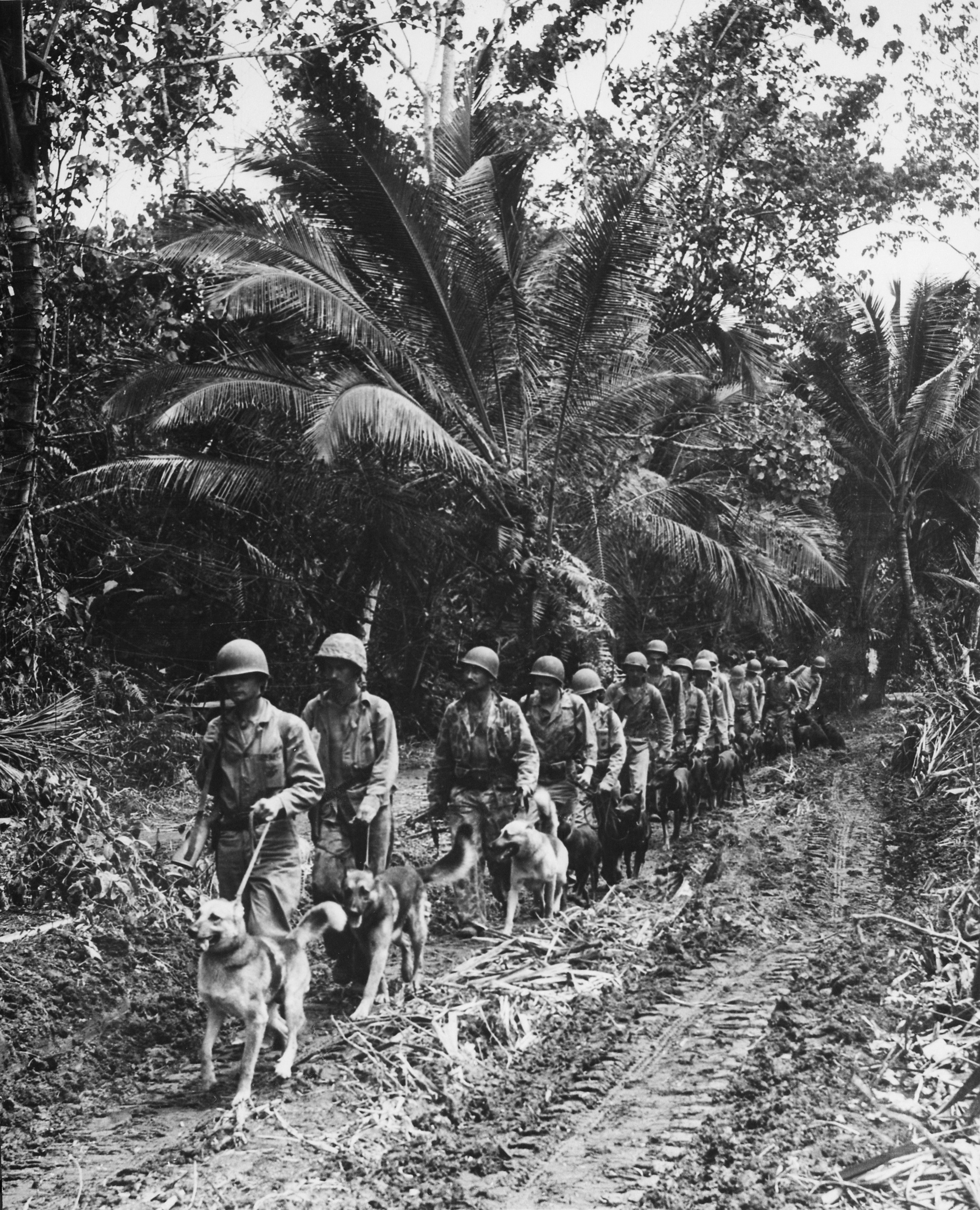
Raiders with their war dogs at Bougainville.

== See also ==
- List of former United States special operations units
- List of United States Marine Corps battalions
- Marine Raider Museum
- United States Marine Corps Force Reconnaissance
- United States Marine Corps Reconnaissance Battalions
