= James Roosevelt =

American general, businessman, and politician (1907–1991)

James Roosevelt II
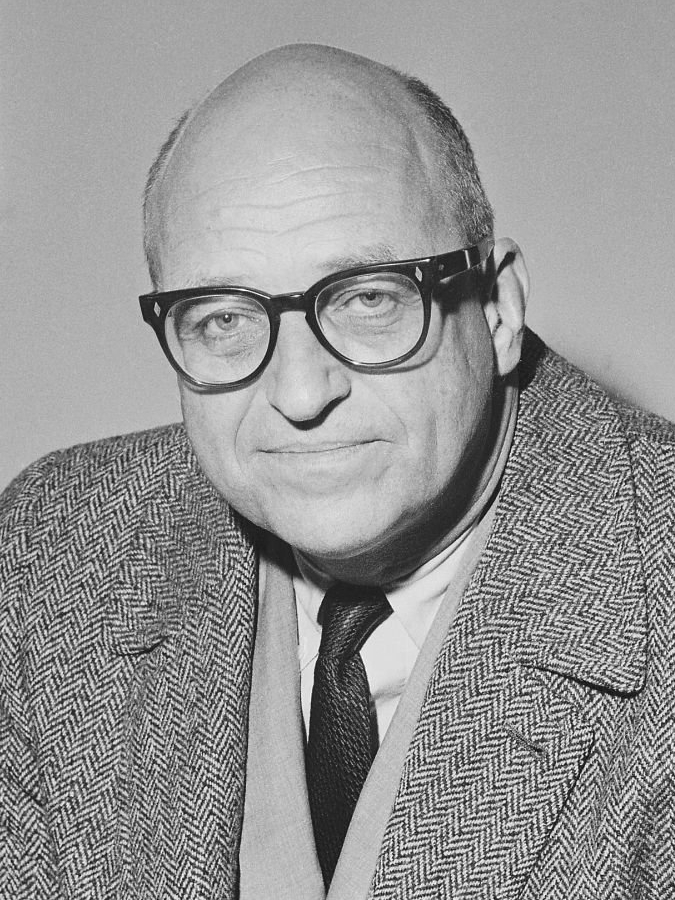
- Roosevelt in 1962

Member of the U.S. House of Representatives from California's 26th district
- In office January 3, 1955 – September 30, 1965
- Preceded by: Sam Yorty
- Succeeded by: Thomas M. Rees

Chair of the California Democratic Party
- In office July 21, 1946 – August 8, 1949
- Preceded by: William M. Malone
- Succeeded by: Oliver Jesse Carter

Secretary to the President
- In office July 1937 – November 1938
- President: Franklin D. Roosevelt
- Preceded by: Louis McHenry Howe
- Succeeded by: Marvin H. McIntyre

Personal details
- Born: James Roosevelt II; December 23, 1907 New York City, New York, U.S.
- Died: August 13, 1991 (aged 83) Newport Beach, California, U.S.
- Party: Democratic
- Spouses: Betsey Maria Cushing (m. 1930; div. 1940) Romelle Theresa Schneider (m. 1941; div. 1955) Gladys Irene Kitchenmaster Owens (m. 1956; div. 1969) Mary Winskill (m. 1969)
- Children: 7, including Sara and James III
- Parents: Franklin Delano Roosevelt; Anna Eleanor Roosevelt
- Relatives: Roosevelt family
- Education: Harvard University (AB); Boston University

Military service
- Allegiance: United States
- Branch/service: United States Marine Corps Reserve
- Years of service: 1936–1959
- Rank: Brigadier general
- Unit: Marine Raiders; 2nd Raider Battalion; 4th Raider Battalion
- Commands: 4th Raider Battalion
- Battles/wars: World War II; Battle of Makin; Battle of Okinawa
- Awards: Navy Cross; Silver Star

James Roosevelt II (December 23, 1907 – August 13, 1991) was an American businessman, Marine officer, activist, and Democratic Party politician. The eldest son of President Franklin D. Roosevelt and Eleanor Roosevelt, he served as an official Secretary to the President for his father and was later elected to the United States House of Representatives representing California, serving five terms from 1955 to 1965. Roosevelt received the Navy Cross while serving as a Marine Corps officer during World War II.

== Early life and career ==
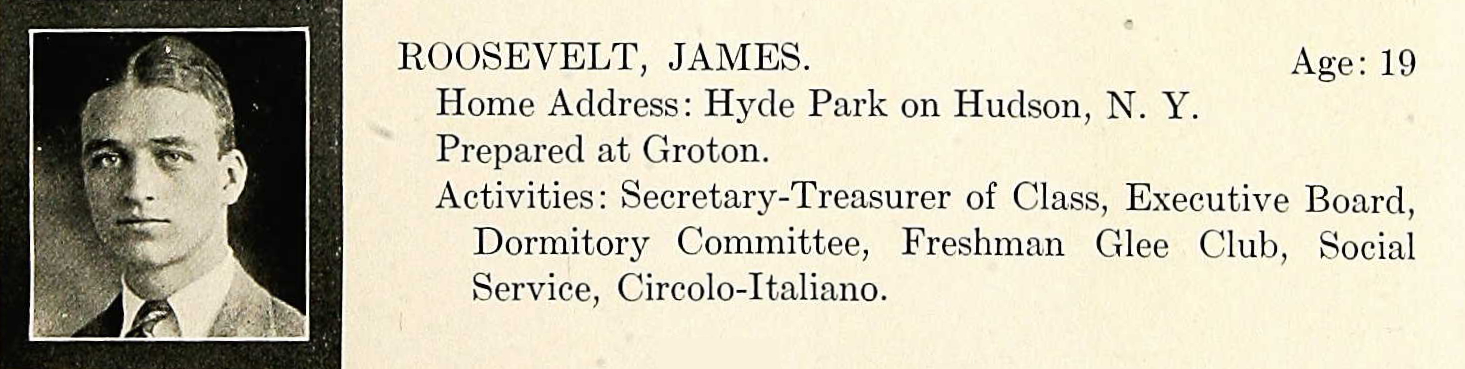
Roosevelt in the Harvard University yearbook, 1930

Roosevelt was born at 123 East 36th Street in New York City. He was named after James Roosevelt I, his paternal grandfather. He attended the Potomac School and St. Albans School in Washington, D.C., and the Groton School in Massachusetts. At Groton, he rowed, played football, and was a prefect in his senior year. After graduating in 1926, Roosevelt attended Harvard, where he rowed with the freshman and junior varsity crews. At Harvard, he followed family traditions in joining the Signet Society and Hasty Pudding Club, of which both his father and his maternal granduncle and paternal fifth cousin once removed, President Theodore Roosevelt, had been members, the Fly Club, which his father had joined, and the Institute of the 1770. Roosevelt graduated from Harvard in 1930 and was elected permanent treasurer of his class.

After graduation, Roosevelt enrolled in the Boston University School of Law. He also took a sales job with the firm of Victor De Gerard of Boston in 1930, remaining with that firm when it amalgamated with the John Paulding Meade Company which, in turn, amalgamated with O'Brion, Russell and Company in 1932. Roosevelt abandoned his law studies within a year due to his success at the firm. In 1932, Roosevelt started his own insurance agency, Roosevelt & Sargent, in partnership with John A. Sargent. As president of Roosevelt & Sargent, he made a substantial fortune (about $500,000 or more than $9 million in 2018 dollars). Roosevelt resigned from the firm in 1937, when he officially went to work at the White House, but retained his half-ownership.

Roosevelt was elected a director of Boston Metropolitan Buildings, Inc. in 1933. He also served briefly as president of the National Grain Yeast Corporation from May to November 1935.

== Politics and the White House ==
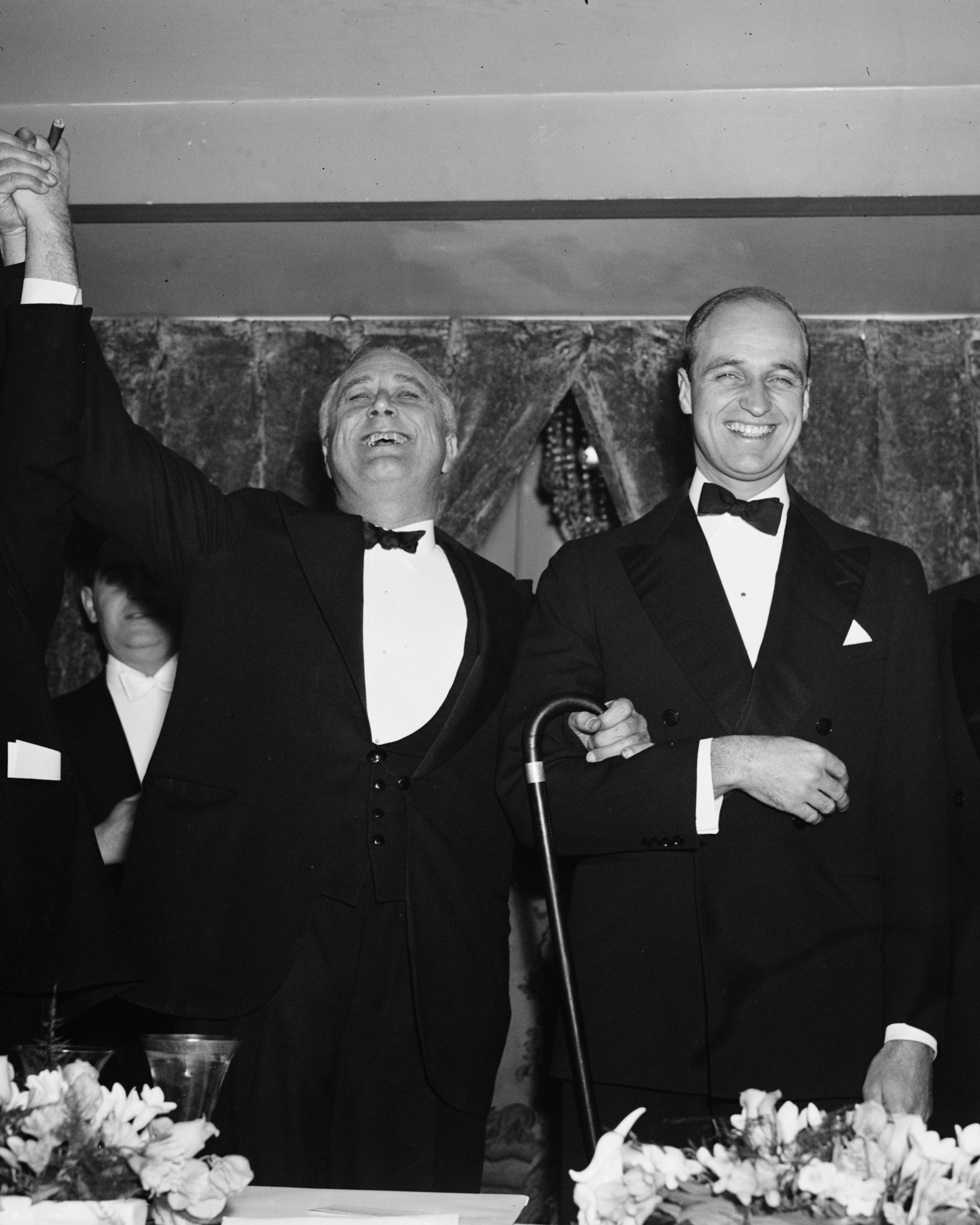
Roosevelt (right) with his father in 1937

Roosevelt attended the 1924 Democratic National Convention where he served, in his words, as his father's "page and prop". In 1928, he and some Harvard classmates campaigned for Democratic presidential nominee Al Smith. In 1932, Roosevelt headed his father's Massachusetts campaign and made about 200 campaign speeches that year. Although FDR lost the Massachusetts Democratic primary to Smith, he easily carried Massachusetts in the November election. Roosevelt was viewed as his father's political deputy in Massachusetts, allocating patronage in alliance with Boston mayor James Michael Curley. He was also a delegate from Massachusetts to the Constitutional Convention for the repeal of Prohibition in 1933.

Roosevelt was a close protege of Joseph P. Kennedy Sr. In fall 1933, the two journeyed to England to obtain the market in post-prohibition liquor imports. Many of Roosevelt's controversial business ventures were aided by Kennedy, including his maritime insurance interests, and the National Grain Yeast Corp. affair (1933–1935). Treasury Secretary Henry Morgenthau Jr. threatened to resign unless FDR forced his son to leave the latter company, suspected of being a front for bootlegging. Roosevelt was instrumental in securing Kennedy's appointment as ambassador to the United Kingdom.

In April 1936, Presidential Secretary Louis Howe died. Roosevelt unofficially assumed Howe's duties. Soon after the 1936 re-election of his father, Roosevelt was given a direct commission as a lieutenant colonel in the Marine Corps, which caused public controversy for its obvious political implications. He accompanied his father to the Inter-American Conference at Buenos Aires in December as a military aide. On January 6, 1937, Roosevelt was officially appointed "administrative assistant to the President"; on July 1, he was appointed secretary to the president. Roosevelt was the White House coordinator for 18 federal agencies by October 1937.

Roosevelt was considered among his father's most important counselors. Time magazine suggested he might be considered "Assistant President of the United States".

In July 1938, there were allegations that Roosevelt had used his political position to steer lucrative business to his insurance firm. Roosevelt had to publish his income tax returns and denied these allegations in an NBC broadcast and an interview in Collier's magazine. This became known as the Jimmy's Got It affair after Alva Johnston's reportage in the Saturday Evening Post. Roosevelt resigned from his White House position in November 1938.

== Hollywood ==
After leaving the White House in November 1938, Roosevelt moved to Hollywood, California, where he accepted a job as a $750/week "administrative assistant" (equivalent to an annualized salary of about $870,000 in 2024) for motion picture producer Samuel Goldwyn. Roosevelt was on Goldwyn's payroll until November 1940. In 1939, he set up Globe Productions, a company that produced short films for penny arcades; however, it was liquidated during Roosevelt's active Marine Corps service in 1944. Roosevelt also was the "R" of RCM Productions, Inc., in partnership with songwriter Sam Coslow and juke box manufacturer Herbert Mills (not to be confused with Herbert Mills of the Mills Brothers, who appeared in some of the company's films) which, like Globe, produced film shorts for the Soundies movie juke boxes. Roosevelt also produced Pot o' Gold and distributed the anti-Nazi British film Pastor Hall. He enlisted his mother, First Lady Eleanor Roosevelt, to narrate a prologue added to the American version of Pastor Hall.

During his Hollywood period, Roosevelt became involved with Joseph Schenck, a movie mogul who was later caught participating in a payoff scheme that was intended to buy peace with movie industry labor unions. In 1942, Schenck pleaded guilty to one count of perjury and spent four months in prison before being paroled. In October 1945, Harry S. Truman granted Schenck a presidential pardon, which was not known to the public until 1947.

== Military career ==
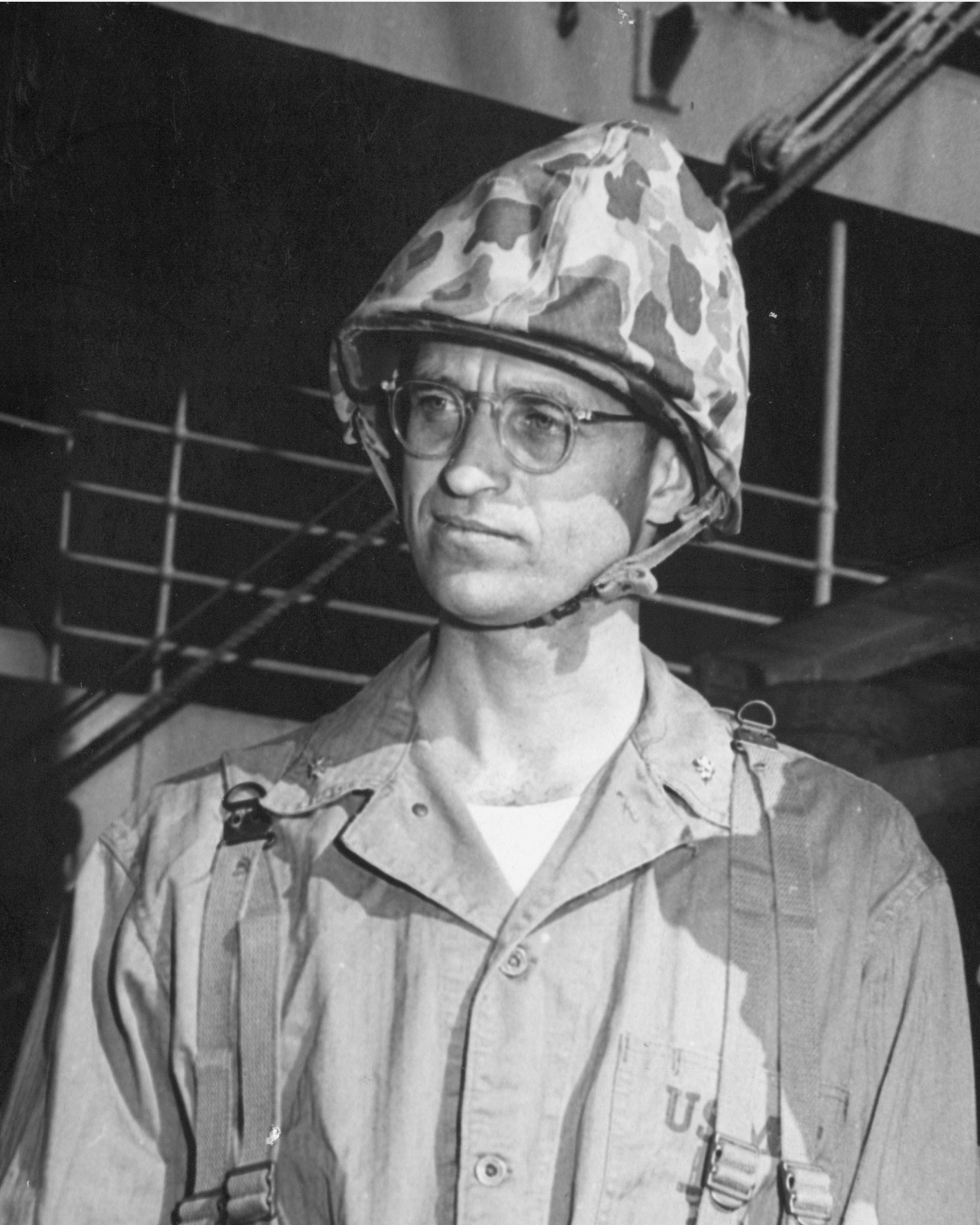
Roosevelt as a Marine Corps lieutenant colonel in World War II

World War II broke out in Europe in September 1939, and Roosevelt resigned the Marine commission the following month as a lieutenant colonel that he had received in 1936 when serving as his father's military aide and accepted a commission as a captain in the Marine Corps Reserve so that he could enter active duty, which Roosevelt did in November 1940.

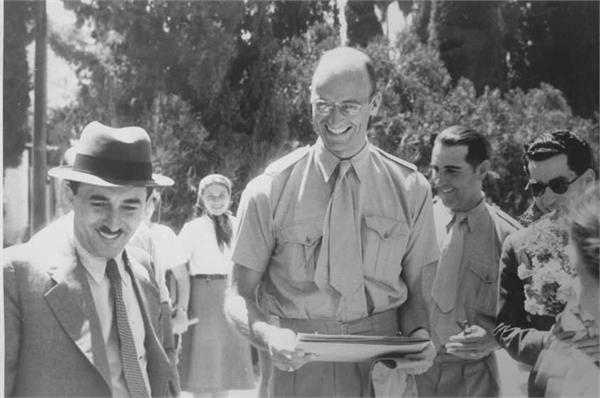
Roosevelt visiting Degania, Mandatory Palestine, 1941

In April 1941, his father sent Roosevelt on a secret, world-circling diplomatic mission to assure numerous governments that the United States would soon be in the war. The leaders contacted included Chiang Kai-shek in China, King Farouk in Egypt, and King George of Greece. During this trip, Roosevelt came under German air attack in both Crete and Iraq. In the African/Middle Eastern portions of the mission, he traveled with Britain's Lord Mountbatten as far as Bathurst in the Gambia. They reported on trans-African air ferry conditions, an important concern of FDR and Winston Churchill at the time. In August, Roosevelt joined the staff of William J. Donovan, coordinator of information, with the job of working out the exchange of information with other agencies.

=== World War II ===
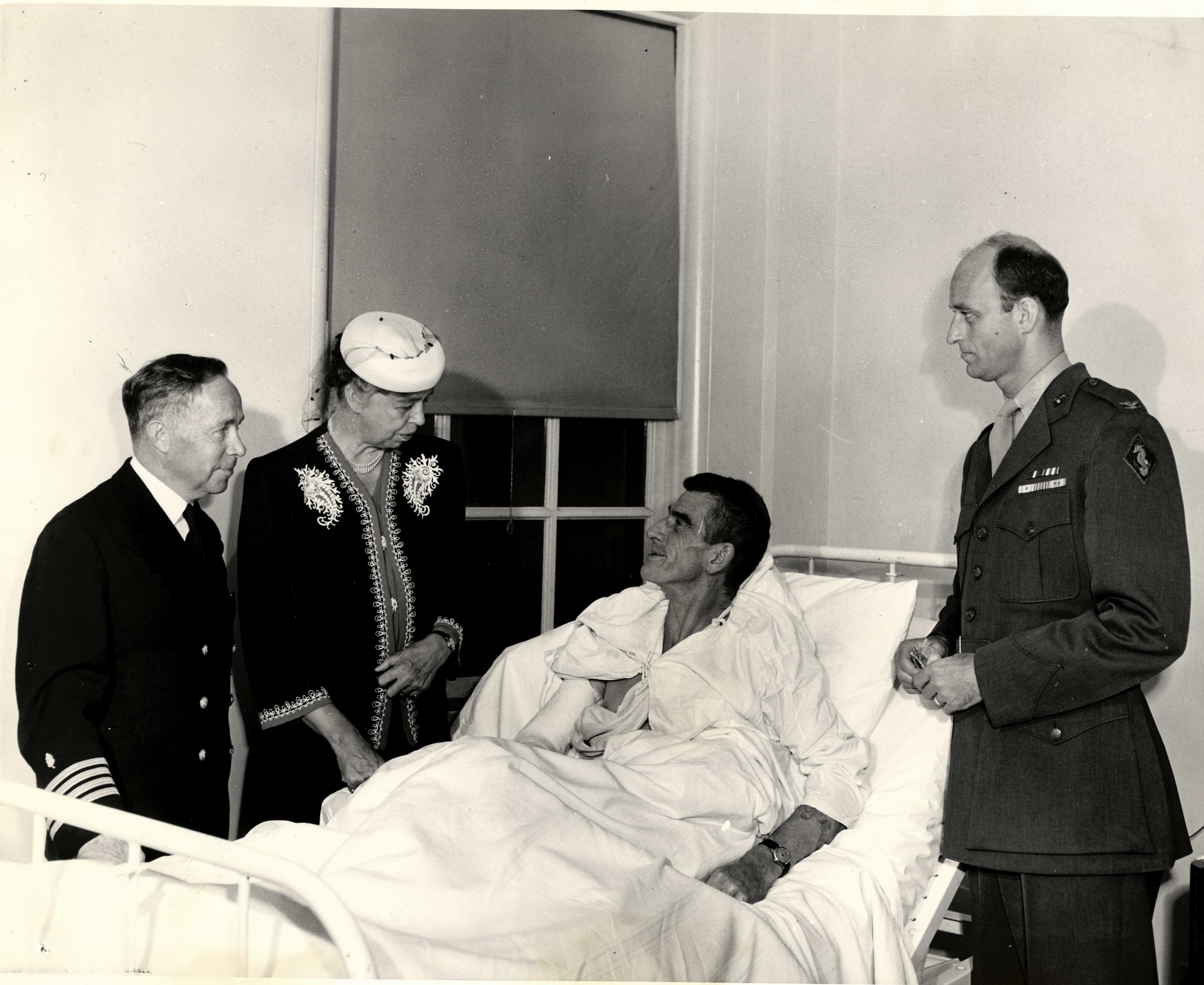
Roosevelt and his mother Eleanor visit Lt. Col. Evans Carlson at the San Diego Naval Hospital, July 1944

After Japan's Attack on Pearl Harbor on December 7, 1941, Roosevelt was seated next to his father when the President delivered his Day of Infamy speech. Roosevelt requested assignment to combat duty and was transferred to the Marine Raiders in January 1942, a new Marine Corps commando force, and became second-in-command of the 2nd Raider Battalion under Evans Carlson (Carlson's Raiders) whom Roosevelt knew when Carlson commanded the Marine detachment at the Warm Springs, Georgia, residence of his father. Roosevelt's influence helped win presidential backing for the Raiders—influenced by the British Commandos—which were opposed by Marine Corps traditionalists.

Despite occasionally debilitating health problems, Roosevelt served with the 2nd Raiders at Midway in early June 1942 and in the Makin Island raid on August 17–18, 1942, where he and 22 others were awarded the Navy Cross. In October, Roosevelt was given command of the new 4th Raiders, but during training for an upcoming combat operation, he became ill enough to be hospitalized by February 1943. Beginning in August 1943, Roosevelt served in various staff positions for the duration of the war. He was attached to and landed with the U.S. Army's 165th Regimental Combat Team, 27th infantry Division during the invasion of Makin on November 20–23 and was awarded the Silver Star by the army. Roosevelt was promoted to colonel on April 13, 1944. He was released from active duty in August 1945 and was placed on the inactive list in October 1945. That same month, Roosevelt became a Compatriot of the Empire State Society of the Sons of the American Revolution.

Roosevelt remained an inactive member of the Marine Corps Reserve until October 1, 1959, when he received a final promotion to the rank of brigadier general upon fully retiring from the service. Because Roosevelt suffered from flat feet, he was allowed to wear sneakers while other Marines were required to wear boots.

== Military awards ==
Roosevelt's military decorations and awards include:

Navy Cross		Silver Star Medal
American Defense Service Medal w/ service star	American Campaign Medal	Asiatic-Pacific Campaign Medal w/ four service stars
World War II Victory Medal	Marine Corps Reserve Ribbon w/ service star	Philippine Liberation Medal w/ service star

=== Navy Cross citation ===
The Navy Cross is presented to James Roosevelt, Major, U.S. Marine Corps (Reserve), for extraordinary heroism and distinguished service as second in command of the Second Marine Raider Battalion against enemy Japanese armed forces on Makin island. Risking his own life over and above the ordinary call of duty, Major Roosevelt continually exposed himself to intense machine-gun and sniper fire to ensure effective control of operations from the command post. As a result of his successful maintenance of communications with his supporting vessels, two enemy surface ships, whose presence was reported, were destroyed by gun fire. Later during evacuation, he displayed exemplary courage in personally rescuing three men from drowning in the heavy surf. His gallant conduct and his inspiring devotion to duty were in keeping with the highest traditions of the United States Naval Service.

For the President,
Chester W. Nimitz

=== Silver Star citation ===
The President of the United States of America, authorized by Act of Congress July 9, 1918, takes pleasure in presenting the Silver Star (Army Award) to Lieutenant Colonel James R. Roosevelt (MCSN: 0–5477), United States Marine Corps, for gallantry in action at Makin Atoll, Gilbert Islands, 20 to 23 November 1943. Attached as an observer to the units of the 27th Infantry Division which effected the landing on Makin Atoll, Lieutenant Colonel Roosevelt voluntarily sought out the scenes of the heaviest fighting. Throughout the three-day period, he continually accompanied the leading elements of the assault, exposing himself to constant danger. His calmness under fire and presence among the foremost elements of the attacking force was a source of inspiration to all ranks.

General Orders: Headquarters, U.S. Army Forces, Central Pacific Area, General Orders No. 55 (1944)(26)

=== Battle stars ===
LtCol Roosevelt was entitled to campaign participation credit (i.e., the "battle stars" worn on the Asiatic-Pacific Campaign Medal) for the following actions:

- Battle of Midway, June 3–6, 1942 (Navy P-7)
- Capture and Defense of Guadalcanal, August 10, 1942 – February 8, 1943 (Navy P-9)
- Makin Raid, August 17–18, 1942 (Navy P-10)
- Eastern Mandates November 1943 – January 1944 (Army, for Makin)

== Post-war career ==
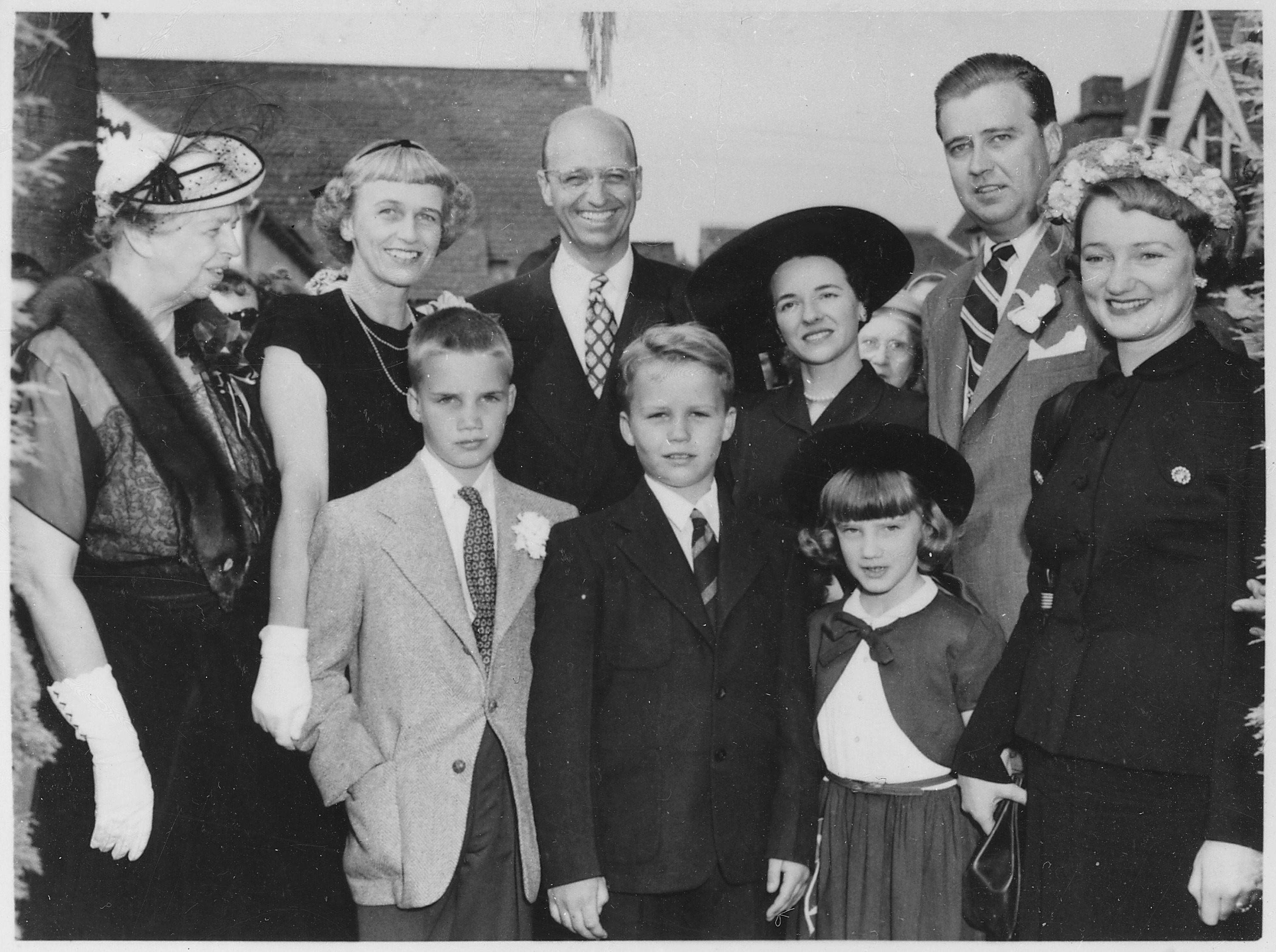
Roosevelt (center) with his family, 1950

After World War II, Roosevelt returned to live in California. He rejoined Roosevelt and Sargent as an executive vice president and established the company's office in Los Angeles. In 1946, he became chairman of the board of Roosevelt and Haines, successor to Roosevelt and Sargent. He later became president of Roosevelt and Company, Inc.

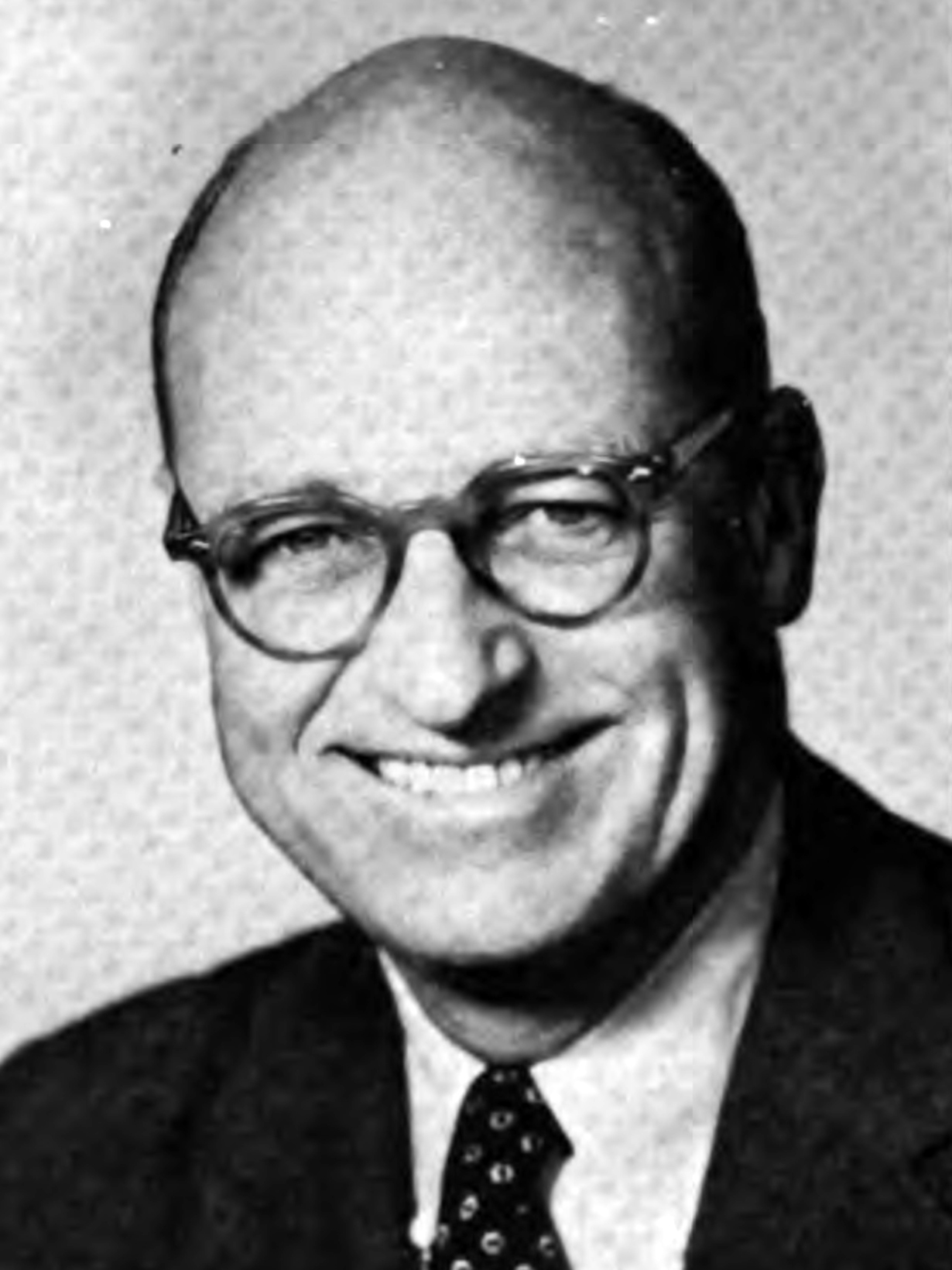
Roosevelt as a U.S. Representative in 1963

=== State Democratic Party ===
On July 21, 1946, Roosevelt became chairman of the California State Democratic Central Committee. He also began making daily radio broadcasts of political commentary. Like his brother Elliott Roosevelt, Roosevelt was prominent in the movement to draft Dwight Eisenhower as the Democratic candidate for president in 1948. When President Truman was renominated instead, Roosevelt stepped down as state chairman on August 8. He remained a Democratic National Committeeman until 1952.

In 1950, Roosevelt was the Democratic candidate for Governor of California but lost to Republican incumbent Earl Warren by almost 30% of the vote.

=== Congress ===
In 1954, Roosevelt was elected U.S. Representative from California's 26th congressional district, a heavily Democratic district. He was re-elected to five additional terms and served from 1955 to 1965, resigning during his sixth term. Roosevelt was one of the first politicians to denounce the tactics of Senator Joseph McCarthy. He was also the only representative to vote against appropriating funds for the House Un-American Activities Committee.

In April 1965, Roosevelt ran for Mayor of Los Angeles, challenging incumbent Sam Yorty, but lost in the primary.

=== UNESCO ===
Roosevelt resigned from Congress in October 1965, 10 months into his sixth term, when President Lyndon B. Johnson appointed him a delegate to the United Nations Educational, Scientific, and Cultural Organization (UNESCO). Roosevelt resigned from UNESCO in December 1966 and retired to become an executive of Bernie Cornfeld's Investors Overseas Service (IOS) in Geneva, Switzerland.

=== Later career ===
Roosevelt joined IOS despite the firm's concurrent investigation by the U.S. Securities and Exchange Commission for numerous irregularities. During the unraveling of IOS, Roosevelt's third wife, Irene Owens, stabbed him "eight times" with his "own Marine combat knife" while he was preparing divorce proceedings in Geneva in May 1969. Although fugitive financier Robert Vesco obtained control of IOS from Cornfeld and absconded with approximately $200 million, Roosevelt initially stayed on with the company. He later added: "As soon as I saw the situation for what it was, in 1971, I resigned my position." Nevertheless, this episode resulted in federal charges being laid against Roosevelt and several others, as well as a Swiss arrest warrant. The charges were later dropped and then he returned to California, settling in Newport Beach.

During this period, Roosevelt became associated with the Nixon administration in several capacities and remained friendly with Richard Nixon until his death. Despite having been a liberal Democrat (in the tradition of his parents) for all of his life, Roosevelt joined Democrats for Nixon and publicly supported President Nixon's 1972 re-election and also supported Ronald Reagan in 1980 and 1984.

=== Writing ===
Roosevelt's writings include Affectionately, FDR (with Sidney Shalett, 1959) and My Parents, a Differing View (with Bill Libby, 1976). The latter was written in part as a response to his brother Elliott's book An Untold Story, which told of FDR's marital issues and was fiercely repudiated by the other siblings. Roosevelt authored the novel A Family Matter (with Sam Toperoff, 1979) and edited The Liberal Papers, published in 1962.

=== Later controversy ===
In the 1980s, a non-profit organization established by Roosevelt, the National Committee to Preserve Social Security and Medicare and its associated political action committee, were investigated by the House Ways and Means Committee for questionable money-raising practices and by the Post Office for mail fraud. By direct mail, Roosevelt's group solicited contributions from elderly persons by claiming that Social Security and Medicare programs were in financial jeopardy. Roosevelt also urged contributors to order their Social Security statements of earnings from his group (these are free from the government).

== Family and marriages ==
Roosevelt's first marriage was in 1930 to philanthropist Betsey Maria Cushing (1908–1998), the middle daughter of surgeon Harvey Williams Cushing and Katharine Stone Crowell. They had two daughters, Sara (1932–2021) and Kate (1936–2002), before divorcing in 1940. Kate married the Kennedy family aide William Haddad and later CEO of the Ford Foundation Franklin A. Thomas.

Roosevelt married his nurse, Romelle Therese Schneider (1915–2002), the next year. They had three children, James (b. 1945), Michael Anthony (b. 1947), and Anna Eleanor "Anne" (b. 1948) before divorcing in 1956.

In 1956, Roosevelt married Gladys Irene Owens (1916–1987), his receptionist, and they had a son together named Hall Delano (called "Del") in 1959 before divorcing 10 years later.

Roosevelt married his fourth wife, Mary Winskill (b. 1939), teacher to his youngest son Del, in 1969. They had a daughter, Rebecca Mary, in 1971.

== Death ==
Roosevelt died on August 13, 1991, in Newport Beach, California, of complications arising from a stroke and Parkinson's disease. He was 83 years old and was the last surviving child of Franklin and Eleanor Roosevelt.

== Electoral history ==
1954 election
Party	Candidate	Votes	%
Democratic	James Roosevelt	94,261	60.1
Republican	Theodore R. "Ted" Owings	62,585	39.9
Total votes		156,856	100.0
Turnout			
Democratic hold			

United States House of Representatives elections, 1956
Party	Candidate	Votes	%
Democratic	James Roosevelt (incumbent)	133,036	68.8
Republican	Edward H. Gibbons	60,230	31.2
Total votes		193,266	100.0
Turnout			
Democratic hold			

1958 election
Party	Candidate	Votes	%
Democratic	James Roosevelt (incumbent)	125,495	72.2
Republican	Crispus Wright	48,248	27.8
Total votes		173,743	100.0
Turnout			
Democratic hold			

1960 election
Party	Candidate	Votes	%
Democratic	James Roosevelt (incumbent)	150,318	73.4
Republican	William E. McIntyre	54,540	26.6
Total votes		204,818	100.0
Turnout			
Democratic hold			

1962 election
Party	Candidate	Votes	%
Democratic	James Roosevelt (incumbent)	112,162	68.3
Republican	Daniel Beltz	52,063	31.7
Total votes		164,225	100.0
Turnout			
Democratic hold			

1964 election
Party	Candidate	Votes	%
Democratic	James Roosevelt (incumbent)	136,025	70.3
Republican	Gil Seton	57,209	29.7
Total votes		193,234	100.0
Turnout			
Democratic hold			

== Dates of rank ==
Lieutenant Colonel, United States Marine Corps: 1936
Captain, United States Marine Corps Reserve: November 1940
Major, United States Marine Corps Reserve: June 1940
Colonel, United States Marine Corps Reserve: April 13, 1944
Brigadier General, United States Marine Corps Reserve: October 1, 1959

== See also ==
- Elliott Roosevelt
- Franklin Delano Roosevelt Jr.
- Anna Eleanor Roosevelt
- John Aspinwall Roosevelt II

U.S. House of Representatives
Preceded by Sam Yorty	Member of the U.S. House of Representatives from California's 26th congressional district 1955–1965	Succeeded by Thomas M. Rees
Party political offices
Preceded by Earl Warren	Democratic nominee for Governor of California; 1950	Succeeded by Richard P. Graves
