= Battle of Luding Bridge =

Part of the Chinese Civil War

Coordinates: 29°54′52.2″N 102°13′47.6″E

- Part of the Long March (Chinese Civil War)
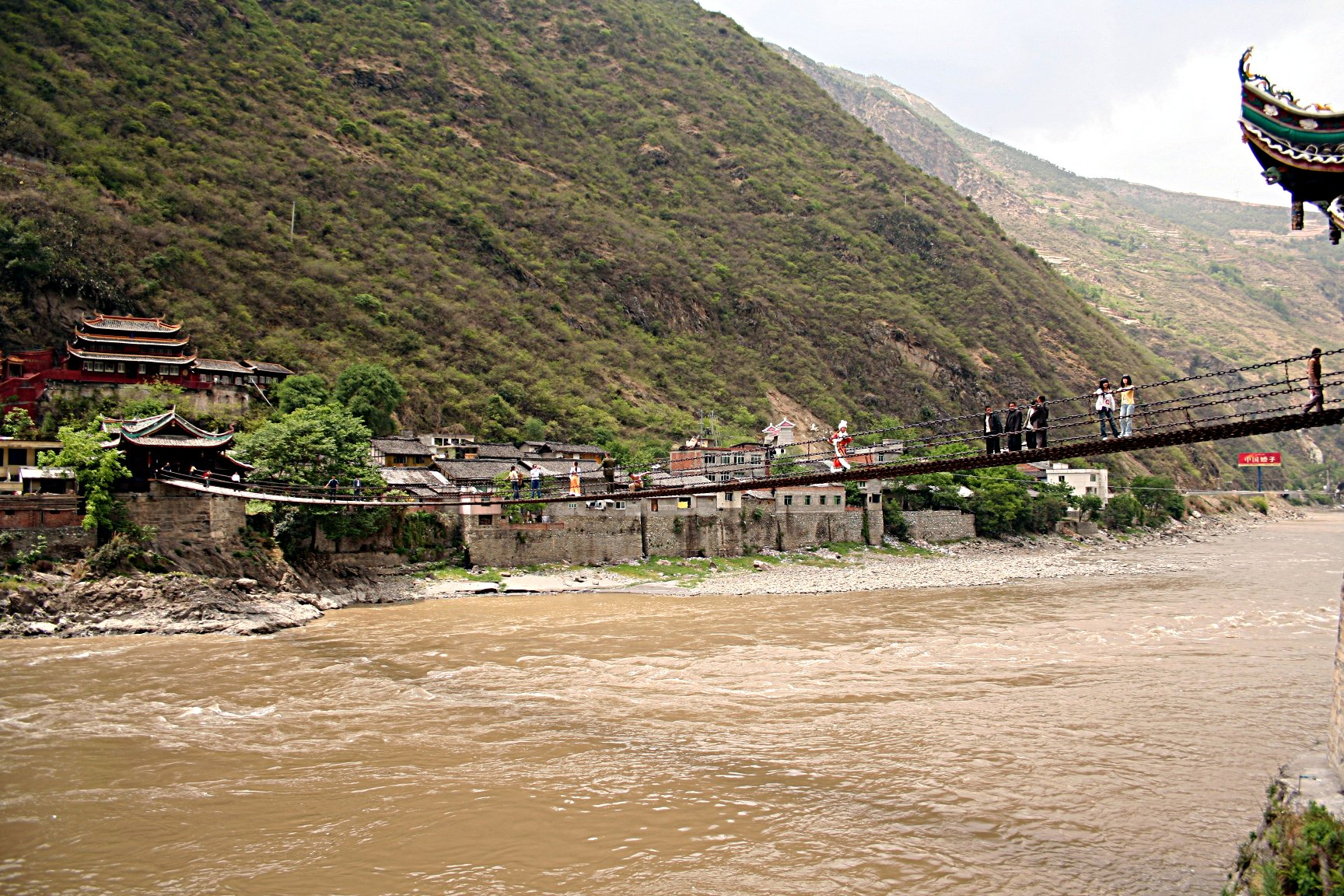
- Luding Bridge seen from the side of the city
Date	May 29, 1935
Location	Dadu River, Luding County, Garzê Tibetan Autonomous Prefecture, Sichuan, China
Result	Red Army victory

Belligerents
Chinese Red Army	Nationalist-allied warlords

Commanders and leaders
Yang Chengwu	Li Quanshan

Strength
22	One regiment

Casualties and losses
3 killed	Minimal; Most fled or went AWOL

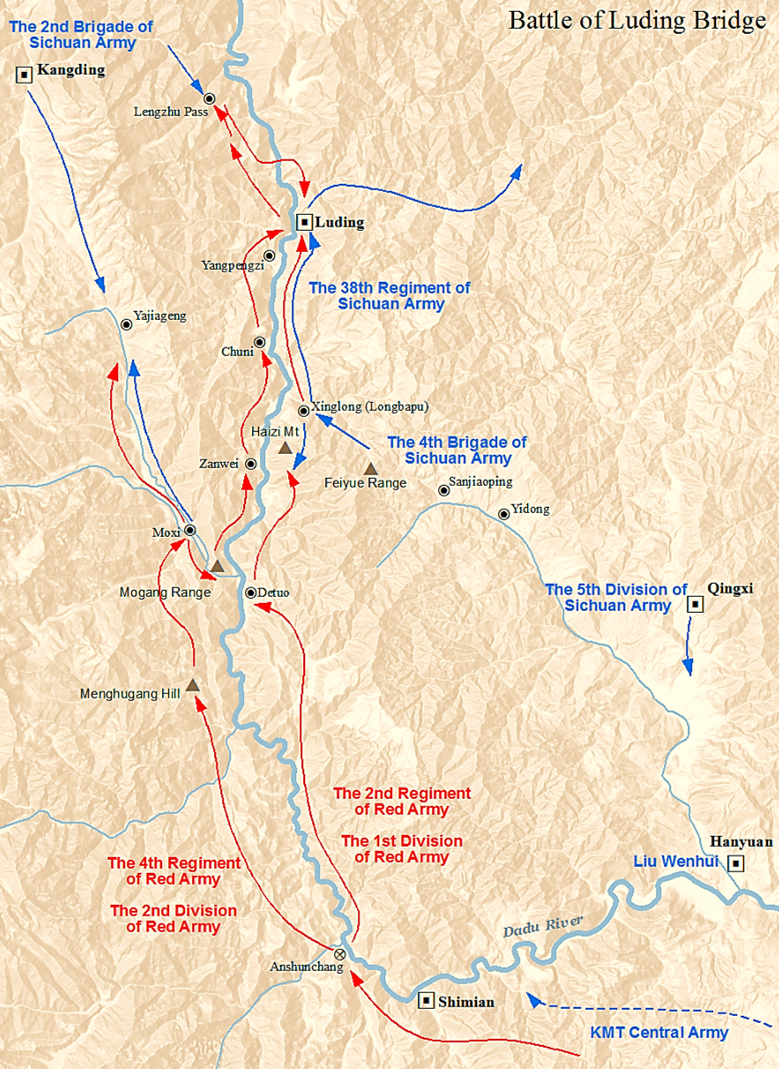
Battle of Luding Bridge

The Battle of Luding Bridge (simplified Chinese: 泸定桥战斗; traditional Chinese: 瀘定橋戰鬥; pinyin: Lúdìng Qiáo Zhàndòu) of 1935 was a controversial crossing of the Luding Bridge by the soldiers of the Fourth Regiment of the Chinese Workers and Peasants' Red Army during the Long March. The bridge, situated over the Dadu River in Luding County, Garzê Tibetan Autonomous Prefecture, Sichuan, China, was located about 80 kilometers west of the city of Ya'an and was a river crossing vital to the Red Army.

== Overview of the bridge's role in the Long March ==
Fleeing from pursuing Chinese Nationalist forces, the communists found that there were not enough boats to cross the Dadu River (Sichuan province). Thus, they were forced to use Luding Bridge, a Qing dynasty suspension bridge built in 1701. The bridge consisted of thirteen heavy iron chains with a span of some 100 yards. Thick wooden boards lashed over the chains provided the roadway across the bridge.

On the morning of May 28, 1935, the 4th regiment of Lin Biao's 2nd division, 1st Corps of the Chinese Red Army, received an urgent order from general headquarters: Luding Bridge must be captured on May 29, 1935, one day ahead of the original schedule.

The 4th regiment then marched 120 km in less than 24 hours. Along the way, they engaged and defeated numerous nationalist forces which blocked their path. On the dawn of May 29, 1935, Lin Biao's troops reached the bridge, only to discover that local warlords allied with the ruling Kuomintang had removed most of the planks on the bridge. Furthermore, Luding City itself was occupied by a regiment of troops from warlord Liu Wenhui's 38th Brigade, 4th brigade, under the 5th division of the 24th Corps. The brigade's commander, Li Quanshan (李全山), was also a wealthy opium dealer. This was a common business for many of the local warlord commanders. Li divided his regiment into two parts, with two battalions deployed inside Luding City, while another battalion was deployed some distance outside in the suburb. His defending forces still enjoyed numerical superiority over the attacking Red Army. The 4th regiment had lost considerable strength during the hurried 24-hour march - approximately two-thirds of the soldiers had fallen behind during the march - and only a battalion-sized force had reached the western bank of the Luding Bridge that morning.

=== Local warlord politics ===
==== Relationship between local warlords ====
A major factor that contributed to the Chinese Red Army's victory was that the local warlords were mainly concerned with Chiang Kai-shek and his plans to take over their territories, and they felt much less threatened by the Red Army's passing through. The area containing Luding bridge was controlled by the warlord Liu Wenhui (刘文辉), who fought the civil wars in Sichuan Province against his own nephew, the warlord Liu Xiang (刘湘). Liu Xiang managed to have nearly all of the other warlords in Sichuan join him in the struggle against his uncle. Chiang ostensibly remained neutral at the beginning of Sichuan's provincial conflicts in order to weaken the local warlords by letting them fight each other. Once the provincial warlords were weak and in disarray, Chiang's forces moved in and took over.

Gradually, it was apparent that the nephew would prevail over the uncle because the nephew was willing to take heavy troop losses in exchange for territory. The uncle was unwilling to sacrifice large number of his troops during initial skirmishes with his nephew. Knowing Liu Xiang would probably not survive a massive counterattack from Liu Wenhui, Chiang shifted his support to the nephew Liu Xiang. But the anticipated counterattack from Liu Wenhui never came. Liu Xiang eventually defeated his own uncle, Liu Wenhui, forcing the latter to retreat to Xikang Province. Chiang was then able to face a weak alliance of smaller warlords rather than confront a single strong warlord that dominated the entire province. As Chiang had expected, when Liu Wenhui's defeat became obvious, the smaller alliance of warlords soon existed in name only.

As a result of the provincial conflicts Liu Wenhui, like the other warlords, was extremely reluctant to commit his force in any significant numbers to fight the Red Army. Knowing that the communists were only passing by, Liu Wenhui, like other warlords, preserved his forces to fight other warlords in Sichuan. Strength preservation was vital to his survival: his force had been reduced to 20,000 from its previous peak of 120,000.

==== Relationship between Chiang Kai-shek and local warlords ====
In addition to preserving forces to fight others, the local warlords were also keen to preserve their forces to keep Chiang out of their own territory. Prior to the Red Army entering Sichuan Province, Chiang's army had followed the Red Army into the neighboring Guizhou province, ostensibly to help the local warlord, Wang Jialie (王家烈), fight them. When the Red Army left Guizhou, Chiang's troops remained. Blamed for failing to stop the Red Army, Wang Jialie was removed by Chiang with the backup of his newly deployed troops in the province. The local warlords knew that they could return and regain control of their territory after the Red Army had left; however, if Chiang's army came, they would be removed for good. Therefore, despite Chiang's advisors' accurate prediction of the need of at least three regiments—and possibly four or five—of the local warlord's troops to stop a single Red Army regiment, the local warlord only deployed a single regiment at Luding Bridge. The main force was deployed to block Chiang's two regiments sent to reinforce the defense of Luding Bridge. The defenders of Luding Bridge were well aware of the political situation after witnessing the fall of the neighboring warlord in Guizhou province and were not willing to sacrifice their own lives for Chiang's potential take-over.

Following a divide and conquer tactic, Chiang awarded the local military command of the northern Dadu River region to a smaller Sichuanese warlord, Yang Sen (杨森). Yang Sen had allied with the second largest Sichuanese warlord, Liu Xiang. Together they began fighting against the biggest Sichuanese warlord Liu Wenhui. At the time of the Luding Bridge incident, the region was still under Liu Wenhui's control. Liu Wenhui's troops certainly would not take orders from the lesser rival Yang Sen. Although he received military, political, as well as financial support from Chiang Kai-shek, Yang Sen would not sacrifice his own troops by sending them to help Liu Wenhui stop the communists. Both were well aware of Chiang's divide and conquer strategy, and both held their main forces to prepare for Chiang's potential take-over. Knowing the local opium dependent warlord commanders were incapable of stopping the communist forces, Chiang tried to send more capable officers from his own officer corps to advise the local troops. These attempts were politely but unanimously rejected by all local Sichuanese warlords, as they feared Chiang's takeover.

=== Weaponry ===
Numerous surviving Chinese Red Army veterans recalled that the weapons used by the local warlords guarding the bridge were far inferior to the weapons used by the Chinese Red Army, suggesting that the incident may have been exaggerated. While the Chinese Red Army soldiers had high morale and were brave, their superior weaponry was probably equally important:

- Realizing their dangerous situation, the Chinese Red Army sent their elite troops to seize the bridge. The soldiers were armed with the best of the weapons captured from the National Revolutionary Army, which in turn had German assistance; the assault team members were all armed with submachine guns with an effective range of 300–400 meters while many others were armed with the semi-automatic rifles with an effective range of up to 800 meters. In contrast, the local warlord's troops were armed only with bolt-action rifles, many of which were single-shot rifles so that their firepower was far less dense than the firepower the Chinese Red Army was able to deploy.
- Another important factor was the ammunition. The Chinese Red Army used the best ammunition they had captured from the nationalists. These included a significant amount of foreign made ammunition. The bullets used by the provincial warlord's troops were locally manufactured. They were far inferior in quality even when compared to ammunition from other domestic Chinese arms manufacturers, such as Shanghai. In addition, most of the provincial troops' bullets were decades old. When the Red Army troops test fired captured cartridges after their victory, it was discovered that the ammunition used by the local warlord's troops only had a maximum range of around 100 meters. When fired from a rifle at standing position, most of the bullets would drop to the ground at approximately 100 meters. This was not enough to cover even the length of the bridge. The machine guns deployed by the local warlord's troops used the same ammunition, with the same range problems. This discovery was affirmed decades later when surviving members of the local warlords' troops were interviewed abroad. The survivors said that they had neither the density of fire nor the rate of fire needed to suppress the Chinese Red Army. In fact, they were forced to take cover for most of the time during the battle, and rarely fired any shots. The interviewers concluded that the superior density of fire, rate of fire, and accuracy gave the Chinese Red Army the edge.

== Orders of battle ==
=== Defender: Nationalists ===
Supreme commander: Chiang Kai-shek, assisted by Liu Wenhui (刘文辉) and Yang Sen 杨森 (in name only).

The 24th Corps commanded by Liu Wenhui (刘文辉)

- The 5th Division
  - The 4th Brigade commanded by Yuan Guorui (袁国瑞), who was in charge of the overall defense of the region but abandoned his post after the initial defeat and fled the scene.
    - The 38th Regiment commanded by Li Quanshan (李全山), the actual commander of the battle
    - The 10th Regiment
    - The 11th Regiment

Chiang Kai-shek's forces did not reach the site in time to participate in the battle, though technically these forces were part of the provincial warlords' command.

=== Attacker: Communists ===
Supreme commander: Mao Zedong, assisted by Zhu De and Zhou Enlai

The right (eastern) column of the 1st Corps commanded by Liu Bocheng and Nie Rongzhen

- The 1st Division commanded by Li Jukui (李聚奎)
  - The 1st Regiment commanded by Yang Dezhi (杨得志) and political commissar Li Lin (黎林)
  - The 2nd Regiment
  - The 3rd Regiment

The left (western) column of the 1st Corps commanded by Lin Biao

- The 2nd Division commanded by Chen Guang (陈光)
  - The 4th Regiment commanded by Huang Kaixiang (黄开湘) and the political commissar Yang Chengwu (杨成武), who were the actual commanders of the battle.

Due to the devastating attrition rate during the Long March, the communist forces were so under-manned that brigade designations did not exist at the time of the incident.

== Lin Biao's role in the assault ==
Lin Biao has commonly been given credit for direct command of the assault. However, the actual commander was the regimental political commissar Yang Chengwu. Lin Biao and other column commanders remained at their temporary headquarters 160 km away from Luding Bridge, and the task of taking the bridge was given to Lin Biao's vanguard unit, the 4th regiment, as it was 40 km closer to Luding. The regiment was led by commander Huang Kaixiang (黄开湘) and political commissar Yang Chengwu (杨成武). Credit was publicly given to Lin Biao during the Cultural Revolution, in which he was glorified to boost his popularity. Giving him direct credit for jobs accomplished by his subordinates was one of the standard propaganda techniques. During the Cultural Revolution, the actual commander, Yang Chengwu was jailed and persecuted under the direct order of Lin Biao.

The actual decision to capture Luding Bridge was made by Mao Zedong himself, at noon on May 26, 1935, with the help of Zhu De. When Mao and Zhu reached Anshunchang ferry, they found just four small boats. After moving a regiment across the river with the ferry, it became apparent that transporting the entire Red Army by ferry would take at least a month. Chiang Kai-shek's nationalist force, commanded by Xue Yue, was closing in fast, so it was decided that the main force would cross the Dadu River at Luding Bridge, 160 km upstream.

Mao decided that the Red Army would launch a two-pronged attack on Luding Bridge:

- The main force would be on the western bank of Dadu River. This was Lin Biao's 2nd division, spearheaded by the commander Wang Kaixiang's and political commissar Yang Chengwu's 4th regiment, 2nd division, 1st Chinese Red Army corps.
- On the eastern bank of the Dadu river would be the 1st division, personally led by the Chinese Red Army chief-of-the-general-staff, Liu Bocheng, and the political commissar of the 1st Corps, Nie Rongzhen. They were spearheaded by commander Yang Dezhi (杨得志)'s and political commissar Li Lin (黎林)'s the 1st regiment, 1st division, 1st Chinese Red Army corps.

Mao had also prepared for the worst: if the two forces could not meet at Luding Bridge, Liu Bocheng and Nie Rongzhen would move into western Sichuan and there set up a new base.

Lin Biao had little to do with the planning or the direct battle maneuvers of the event. He probably provided logistical implementation for Mao's orders, and then dispatched his units to follow the plan. Lin Biao himself did not reach Luding Bridge until May 30, 1935, well after the end of the battle. Even Liu Bocheng reached Luding Bridge during the night of May 29, 1935, earlier than Lin Biao. However, Lin Biao can be credited with having the audacity, even recklessness, to order his troops to quickly march 160 km in 24 hours through hostile territory, and then, without rest, fight against an enemy of unknown strength.

== Prelude to the battle ==
On their way to Luding Bridge, the soldiers of the 4th regiment, 2nd division, 1st corps of the Chinese Red Army discovered that on the opposite bank, two regiments of the nationalist reinforcement were on their way to Luding Bridge. The nationalists were faster because they used torches at night, while the communists avoided them in order to move without being detected. When Red Army commander Wang Kaixiang and political commissar Yang Chengwu (杨成武) did finally decide to use torches, they were discovered by their adversaries.

Neither of the forces had any radio equipment, and the sound of the raging river made vocal communication impossible. Consequently, the nationalists used bugles for command and control. However, the communists successfully fooled the nationalists into believing that they were on the same side by using the bugle commands of Chiang Kai-shek's ally and designated regional commander, Yang Sen, in reply to the nationalists' signals. In the face of heavy rains, the nationalists stopped their march and camped. The communists pressed on, and the battalion-sized contingent arrived at the bridge first.

On the eastern bank, the right column already started their march to the Luding Bridge. The Nationalist 10th infantry regiment, 4th brigade was the closest opposing force to the communists, and began spreading out along the Dadu river. On May 27, 1935, the 2nd regiment of the 1st division of the communist force defeated the nationalist 10th regiment at Waba (瓦坝) after several hours of fierce fighting. The next day, after more than a 50 km march, the communist 2nd regiment successfully defeated the remaining units of the nationalist 10th regiment. On May 29, 1935, the communist 2nd regiment engaged the nationalist 11th regiment, and with the help of the communist 3rd regiment, which arrived after the battle began, completely wiped out the nationalist 12th regiment. The communist 2nd and 3rd regiments then proceeded to destroy the brigade headquarters located 25 km away from Luding Bridge. The nationalist commander of the 4th brigade, Yuan Guorui (袁国瑞), fled with his surviving staff to the surrounding mountains, from where they were unable to reestablish links with the rest of the nationalist forces after the bridge and the city were both taken by the communists. This left to Li Quanshan (李全山), the regimental commander of the 38th regiment, the task of organizing the defense, which he was unable to accomplish.

== The battle at the bridge ==
With the main Kuomintang army closing in on the Chinese Red Army, it was decided to send a small volunteer force across the badly damaged bridge. After preparation, the volunteer force led by the company commander, Liao Dazhu (廖大珠), of the 2nd company, began their assault on the bridge at 4:00 p.m. under a covering barrage of mortars and loud bugler sounds from the south end. Red Army sources agree that the members of the force crawled over the bare iron chains of the bridge while under heavy Nationalist machine-gun fire from the opposite side.

Most of the assault team did not leave their names behind. Of the 22 assault team members, only four other than the team leader, Liao Dazhu, are known. The four whose names are known are: political commissar of the 2nd company Wang Haiyun (王海云), communist party secretary of the 2nd company Li Youlin (李友林), the communist party secretary of the 3rd company Li Jinshan (李金山), and the deputy squad commander of the 4th squad of the 2nd company Liu Zihua (刘梓华).

According to Red Star Over China, three were hit, fell, and died but the rest came forward, and Red Star Over China suggests that some of the warlord forces admired their foes and were not shooting to kill. The Regimental political commissar, Yang Chengwu, was the commander who led the actual attack. According to his memoirs and the recollections of the survivors of the twenty-two man assault team, there were no fatalities on the bridge itself, but several members of the force were wounded. However, in the ensuing battle to establish a bridgehead, two men were killed, and there were more fatalities in the subsequent battles to defend the bridgehead from the nationalists' counterattacks, which continued until the Red Army reinforcements arrived. At a late stage in the battles, "paraffin was thrown on the planking and it began to burn". Despite the presence of Red Army forces on both ends of the bridge, the NRA force guarding the bridge and Luding City were driven off it and began to retreat towards the city proper, and some surrendered.

According to Red Star Over China

At last one Red crawled up over the bridge flooring, uncapped a grenade and tossed it with perfect aim into the enemy redoubt. Desperate, the officers ordered the rest of the planking torn up. It was already too late. More Reds were crawling into sight. (Kerosene) was thrown on the planking and it began to burn. By then about twenty Reds were moving forward on the hands and knees, tossing grenade after grenade into the enemy machine-gun nest.

As a reward, every surviving member of the volunteer team was awarded a fountain-pen, a notebook, a pair of chopsticks, a Zhongshan suit, and an enamel drinking mug, and this was significant at the time in terms of Chinese Red Army's standard: the reward was equivalent of at least half a decade's salary of an ordinary Chinese Red Army soldier. The political commissar of the 4th regiment, Yang Chengwu, also received the same reward.

Despite their rewards, none of the survivors lived to see the establishment of the People's Republic. The duty squad commander of the 4th squad of the 2nd company Liu Zihua (刘梓华) was killed in January 1949 when liberating Tianjin during the Pingjin Campaign, and the commander of the 2nd company, Liao Dazhu (廖大珠) was the last to die; he was killed in the battle to liberate Shanghai in May 1949. The commander of the 4th regiment, Huang Kaixiang (黄开湘) did not survive either; after the Long March, the regimental commander was struck with malaria and he accidentally shot himself while under the convulsive effects of the disease. At the Luding Bridge memorial museum, specially built to commemorate the event, only four out of the 22 pillars had names engraved, while the rest were unnamed. For the pillar with the name of the deputy squad commander of the 4th squad of the 2nd company, Liu Zihua (刘梓华), his head statue was also engraved.

== Second battle ==
There were actually two battles fought simultaneously at the site, one at the bridge and the other in Luding City, although due to the needs of political propaganda, the second battle was not publicized until recently. Indeed, it was the second battle that was fought at the suburb of Luding City that was critical in taking the bridge, and the first shot of all was fired in this "second" battle. Furthermore, it was not the twenty-two members of the assault team from the 2nd company, 4th regiment that first entered Luding City, but the 7th company of the same regiment, with more than five dozen soldiers, who first succeeded in breaking into the city.

After reaching the bridge, the commander and the political commissar of the 4th regiment, 2nd division, Chinese Red Army 1st Corps divided the troops into three formations: one assault team to attack the bridge, one team to cross the river and attack them from behind from the suburb of Luding City, and the majority of the force to provide the cover for the assault team. The 7th company was assigned to perform the second task.

There was a turn of the Dadu River two km downstream from Luding Bridge, which made it impossible for the defenders of the city to see what was going on at the turn—besides, the nationalist defenders never expected that anyone would cross from there. As a result, the 7th company was able to cross the Dadu River with two rafts, and there was not a single enemy soldier at the opposite shore. After the crossing, the sixty soldiers of the 7th company marched upstream toward Luding City on the eastern bank of Dadu River.

Around 2:00 p.m. on May 29, 1935, the 7th company was discovered by the sentries of the battalion the nationalist defenders deployed outside the city, and the nationalist sentries hastily fired the first shots of the battle at the Luding Bridge. However, the communist soldiers and the nationalist soldiers were more than 250 meters apart; the bullets of the nationalist soldiers could not reach their targets due to the nationalists' inferior weaponry. The communist soldiers of the 7th company immediately assaulted the enemy position and conquered the nationalist battalion within two hours.

Learning that the Red Army had come from behind, the nationalist commanders immediately sent out another battalion for reinforcement, leaving only a token force to guard the bridge. The nationalists were overconfident in their defense of the bridge, not believing that anybody could cross over the bare iron chains under fire. However, the nationalist response simply took too long and it was so disorganized that it was not until the battalion outside the city was decimated that the reinforcement began to move out of the city. One of the reasons for the delay was that the nationalists did not believe that the 120 km to Luding City could be marched in such a short time, and in fact, many of nationalist commanders thought the battle at the suburb of Luding City was a case of misunderstanding and friendly fire amongst nationalist forces.

After realizing the attacking force was indeed the enemy and not the reinforcements they hoped for, purportedly only after witnessing defeat of the battalion deployed in the suburb, the nationalist defenders inside the city were reluctant to leave the protection of the city wall and fortifications. Furthermore, the survivors of the battalion deployed outside the city wall greatly exaggerated the strength of the attacking communist force in order to make an excuse for their own failure after escaping back into the city. In order to prevent morale from dropping further, the nationalist commanders decided not to inform their soldiers about the incoming communist force other than for the battalion sent out, a decision they would later regret.

The disorganized and slow response also created another disaster for the national defenders inside the city wall: unaware of the newly changed battle plans that were hastily put together, the soldiers of the remaining battalion began to flee, abandoning their posts, because they thought the other battalion deployed to reinforce the already-destroyed battalion in the suburb were in fact escaping. The battalion on its way outside the city wall, in turn, seeing the remaining defenders starting abandoning their posts to flee and hearing the greatly exaggerated enemy from the survivors from the already destroyed battalion, also panicked and fled back into the city, abandoning their assigned mission.

Taking advantage of the chaos, soldiers of the 7th company, 4th regiment of the 2nd division, 1st Chinese Red Army Corps successfully fought their way into Luding City at 4:00 p.m., suffering only a dozen fatalities along the way. By this time, the 2nd company of the same regiment on the western end of the bridge had already started their assault from the other side. The survivors of the 7th company fought their way directly toward the bridge, and successfully supported their comrades from the other side on the western bank of the Dadu River. After the assault team had crossed the bridge, and subsequent arrival of the main force of the 4th regiment, the battle ended at 6:00 p.m. with the bridge and the city firmly in the Red Army's hands.

== The third battle at Luding City ==
Four hours after the communist victory, nationalist reinforcements arrived from the eastern bank of the Dadu River, and together with the survivors of the defenders who were scattered by the Red Army in earlier battles, the nationalists launched their attack from the eastern suburb of Luding City around 10:00 p.m. on the night of May 29, 1935. The 4th regiment of the 2nd division, 1st CRA Corps, expected a fierce battle between them and the nationalists, but instead, the battle was short-lived. The nationalists either surrendered or escaped into the surrounding mountains almost as soon as the battle began, because the 1st regiment, 1st division, 1st CRA Corps on the eastern bank of Dadu River, led by commander Yang Dezhi (杨得志) and political commissar Li Lin (黎林) had also arrived, soon followed by the main force of the 1st division led by the Chinese Red Army Chief of the General Staff, Liu Bocheng, and the political commissar of the 1st corps, Nie Rongzhen, when the battle was supposed to continue. Red Army units on both banks of Dadu River had met at the Luding City area as Mao had planned beforehand.

== Significance ==
The entire Chinese Red Army had completed its crossing by June 2, 1935, and thus this skirmish may have saved the Red Army from a major defeat:

"'Victory was life' said P'eng Teh-huai (Peng Dehuai); 'defeat was certain death'." (Red Star Over China (1971 edition)). The event was incorporated in the elementary school text for patriotic education.

The event raised morale for the troops, and was later used as a propaganda tool to highlight the courage of the communists. "For their distinguished bravery the heroes of An Jen Ch'ang [the seized ferry boat] and Liu Ting Chiao [the bridge] were awarded the Gold Star, the highest decoration in the Red Army of China." (Red Star Over China).

== Controversy ==
=== Zhu De's account ===
In Agnes Smedley's biography, The Great Road: The Life and Times of Chu Teh, she mentions that Zhu De as a child had heard about the fate of the Taiping army that had perished there, and had been told:

"On dark nights, when there is no moon, you can still hear the spirits of our Taiping dead wailing at the Ta Tu River crossing and over the town where they were slaughtered. They will wail until they are avenged. Then their spirits will rest." (The Great Road, page 27).

This account says that the attackers were led by Platoon Commander Ma-Ta-chiu, who was also the first to die. And that overall seventeen men died. (This may include deaths in the unit that had crossed the river by boat and attacked from the other side.)

It appears independent of the better-known version given by Edgar Snow. Different English versions of the same Chinese names are used: the river is the 'Ta Tu' and the bridge "Lutinchiao".

=== Brzezinski ===
In a speech given at Stanford University, former US National Security Advisor Zbigniew Brzezinski related the following conversation with Deng Xiaoping:

I even told them we went to Luding Bridge, which was the site of a special, important heroic battle in which the Red Forces were able to cross the river under very difficult and treacherous conditions. If they hadn't they would have been wiped out. It was a great feat of arms to have crossed that bridge. At that point, Chairman Deng smiled and said, "Well, that's the way it's presented in our propaganda. We needed that to express the fighting spirit of our forces. In fact, it was a very easy military operation. There wasn't really much to it. The other side were just some troops of the warlord who were armed with old muskets and it really wasn't that much of a feat, but we felt we had to dramatize it."

=== Political propaganda ===
The incident served as a major morale-raising opportunity for political propaganda. It is incorporated into the textbooks of Chinese elementary schools. In order to magnify the heroism of the Red Army, however, the important second battle fought at the suburb of Luding City on the eastern bank of Dadu River was kept secret, despite the fact it is well documented in the communists' own history archives. Even in the era of reform, movies such as Dadu River (1979), depicting the event, did not touch the subject. It was not until well after 2000, when Wu Qingchang (吴清昌), a veteran of the second battle was interviewed by various Chinese media, that the second battle and its importance, as well as the participants of the 7th company, 4th regiment, 2nd division, 1st Chinese Red Army corps became known to the public. Wu was only 18 when he participated in the battle, and he lost a section of his left index finger in that battle. He was the only survivor in his squadron to reach Shaanxi after the Long March.

For many years in movies and TV series made of the March and the battle itself only the 4th Regiment's vanguard platoon, and the actions of the other servicemen of the regiment which helped lay replacement wooden planks on the bridge as the attacking force advanced into the northern side of the river were seen, the 2016 movie The Warriors finally featured the point of view of servicemen of the 1st Regiment when that unit fired at the north end of the bridge where the Nationalist force was stationed.

=== Recent additions ===
Ed Jocelyn and Andrew McEwen, two western writers living in China investigated the matter while retracing the route of the Long March:

With the exception of Yang Chengwu, no source ever suggests that there were no casualties on Luding Bridge. The very first description of the battle, given by Edgar Snow in Red Star Over China in 1937, cited three deaths. The official number, inscribed on the bridge itself, is now four.

Sun Shuyun, who was born in China and has made documentaries for the BBC, did her own retracing of the march. At Luding Bridge, a local blacksmith gave her the following account:

Only a squadron was at the other end. It was a rainy day. Their weapons were old and could only fire a few metres. They were no match for the Red Army. When they saw the soldiers coming, they panicked and fled—their officers had long abandoned them. There wasn't really much of a battle. Still, I take my hat off to the twenty-two soldiers who crawled on the chains. My father and I did it in the old days when we checked the bridge, but we were inside a basket. Those men were brave. They crossed very quickly.

The blacksmith also said that after they had crossed, the Red Army cut through four of the bridge's nine chains, making it unusable for months. This has not been mentioned in other accounts, but Sun Shuyun found another source and discovered that the idea came from Mao. (One of these chains is on display in The Military Museum of the Chinese People's Revolution in Beijing.) She also suggests that the Red Army was indeed given an easy passage, but that this was done by local warlords in defiance of Chiang Kai-shek:

It seems that one of the warlords, Liu Wenhui (刘文辉), was a key figure... When [Red Army commander] Zhu De, Liu Bocheng and Nie Rongzhen, his fellow Sichuanese, sent him money and a letter, asking for safe passage through his territory, including the Luding Bridge, he happily obliged... 'Chiang gives my army no ammunition or food, how can we fight tough battles?' he grumbled. He told his men to put up only half-hearted resistance, and to allow the Red Army through without much of a fight...

Liu kept his contact with the Communists ... In 1949 he mutinied, taking two other warlords with him over to the Communists... he was made Minister of Forestry, and then a minister in the Communist government. (Ibid.)

In 2006 the Propaganda Director of Luding government stated: "West Point has documented the crossing of Luding Bridge into their textbook."

Jung Chan, author of "Wild swans", in her bestseller follow up entitled "Fly, wild swans" states, after having made some researches on that event, that Snow's novel was almost surely based on text provided by the regime's propaganda and that no real conflict happened at the bridge.

== See also ==
- Outline of the Chinese Civil War

== Sources ==
- "Crossing of the Luding Bridge"
- "Account by the late Will Downs
- The Long March : The Untold Story by Harrison E. Salisbury
- The Long March 1935 : The Epic of Chinese Communism's Survival by Dick Wilson
- Stories of the Long March - Lightning Attack on Luting Bridge by Yang Chengwu
- Long March Diary by Charlotte Salisbury
- Mao: The Unknown Story by Jung Chang and Jon Halliday
- The Crossing of the Iron Chain Bridge
- The Long March (Jocelyn & McEwen), by Ed Jocelyn and Andrew McEwen, Constable 2006
- The Long March (Sun Shuyun), by Sun Shuyun, HarperCollins 2006
