= Katie Leung =

Scottish actress (born 1987)

- 梁佩詩
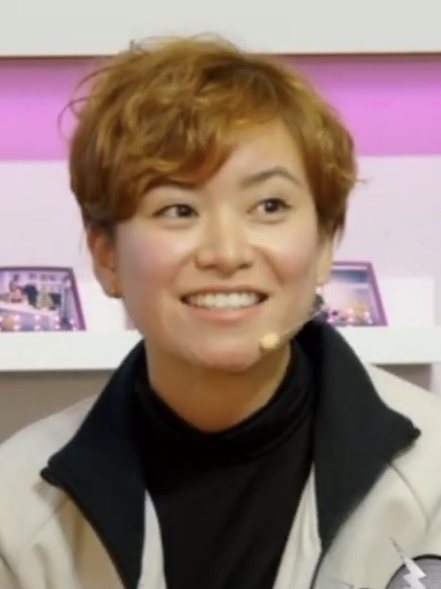
- Leung at the German Comic Con Home Edition in 2020
- Born: 8 August 1987 (age 39); Dundee, Scotland
- Education: Edinburgh College of Art (BA); Royal Conservatoire of Scotland (BA)
- Occupation: Actress
- Years active: 2004–present
- Children: 1

Chinese name
- Traditional Chinese: 梁佩詩
- Simplified Chinese: 梁佩诗
Transcriptions
Standard Mandarin
- Hanyu Pinyin: Liáng Pèishī
Yue: Cantonese
- Yale Romanization: Lèuhng Pui-sī
- Jyutping: loeng4 pui3 si1
- Hong Kong Romanisation: Leung Pui-sze

Katie Leung (born 8 August 1987; pronounced [lœŋ˨˩]) is a Scottish actress. She began her career playing Cho Chang in the Harry Potter film series from 2005 to 2011. On television, she is known for her roles in One Child (2014), Strangers (2018), Annika (2021–2023), The Peripheral (2022), and Bridgerton (2026), and as the voice of Caitlyn Kiramman in the Netflix animated series Arcane (2021–2024).

== Early life ==
Leung was born in Dundee to Peter Leung, a Hong Kong-born businessman and restaurateur who opened a company in Glasgow, and Kar Wai Li, a banker. Her parents divorced when she was three, and she continued living in Scotland with her father, stepmother, and siblings after her birth mother moved back to Hong Kong. Her father's occupation led to Leung growing up in several towns, including Ayr, Hamilton, and Motherwell. She attended Hamilton College.

== Career ==
=== 2004–2011: Early roles and Harry Potter ===
Leung's father saw an advertisement for a Harry Potter and the Goblet of Fire casting call, and suggested she should try out. She queued for four hours for a five-minute audition despite feeling she had little likelihood of obtaining the role. Two weeks later she was called back for a workshop and was cast as Cho Chang, beating more than 3,000 other girls for the part. She has stated that her Scottish accent probably gave her an advantage in the casting, as the casting director asked the girls who attended the audition, "Is there anyone here from Scotland?" To which only Katie Leung raised her hand.

In a 2011 interview, Leung recalled how her fondest memory of the Harry Potter experience was the first audition, because both her parents, who were separated at the time, went with her: "It was a really nice moment because my parents hadn't seen each other for a long, long time." In an effort to heavily promote Goblet of Fire, Warner Bros. sent Leung to China in the film's second week of release, in an atypical move towards a market that was not used to frequent celebrity visits at the time.

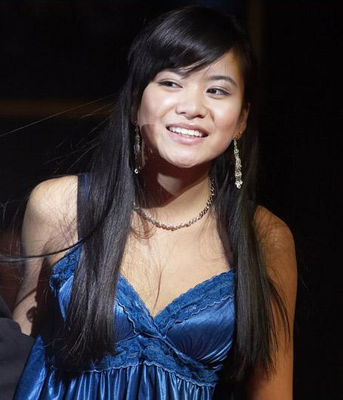
Leung at the Tokyo premiere of Harry Potter and the Goblet of Fire in 2005

Leung reprised her role in the subsequent films in the series, most notably Harry Potter and the Order of the Phoenix, in which her character had the distinction of being Harry Potter's first romance. As a result, Leung and co-star Daniel Radcliffe (Harry) shared an on-screen kiss that received much media coverage. While Leung was greeted warmly by most of the fandom, other fans created hate websites in response to her casting and posted many racist messages which were upsetting to her at the time. In March 2021, Leung opened up further about the racist harassment she received from fans while filming Harry Potter; appearing on an episode of the Chinese Chippy Girl podcast, she revealed that she was told by her publicists to deny what was happening if any interviewer asked.

Leung was named Scotland's most stylish female and the hottest Scotswoman in 2007 by Scotland on Sunday. In July 2007, she was cast by Gold Label Records, a subsidiary of EMI in Hong Kong, to be the female lead in the music video for "Love Coming Home" (愛回家) by Leo Ku. In her first role outside of Harry Potter, Leung played Hsui Tai in the episode "Cat Among the Pigeons" of ITV1's Agatha Christie's Poirot, which premiered on 21 September 2008.

=== 2012–2021: Stage and television career ===
Following the end of Harry Potter, Leung was uncertain if she wanted to further pursue a career in acting but was inspired to continue after attending a drama course at the Royal Conservatoire of Scotland. In December 2011, she was awarded the role of Jung Chang as her stage debut role in Chang's autobiographical play Wild Swans. In comparing film to live performances, Leung said, "The obvious challenge is of course getting it right the first time, which is weirdly exciting for me." The play made its world premiere in Cambridge, Massachusetts in February 2012, before returning to Motherwell and concluding with an April–May run at the Young Vic in London.

In June 2012, it was confirmed that Leung would star in the Channel 4 four-part drama series Run as leading character Ying, an undocumented Chinese immigrant living in Brixton. In 2013, Leung starred alongside Vera Chok in The World of Extreme Happiness, a play about the world of migrant workers in China's rapidly emerging modern era. In the production, staged at The Shed at the National Theatre, she played the role of Sunny, a female migrant worker.

In April 2014, it was announced that Leung was to play the lead role of Mei, a first-born Chinese girl adopted by an American mother and British father, in the TV miniseries One Child. In the story, her character is asked to return to her birthplace, Guangzhou, when her birth mother desperately seeks her assistance in saving her son. The series, a co-production of BBC Drama and Sundance TV, filmed in May 2014 in London and Hong Kong, aired on Sundance TV in December 2014, and was broadcast on BBC Two in February 2016. Leung received praise from Catherine Gee of The Daily Telegraph, who called her performance "beautifully understated". Leung was named a 2014 BAFTA Breakthrough Brit.

In late 2016, Leung appeared in the Tony Kushner play The Intelligent Homosexual's Guide to Capitalism and Socialism with a Key to the Scriptures (iHo) at the Hampstead Theatre in London. In 2017, she co-starred with Jackie Chan and Pierce Brosnan in The Foreigner, playing Fan, Chan's character's daughter. This was followed by a supporting role as Lau Chen in the ITV drama Strangers, also known by the title White Dragon. Leung subsequently appeared in recurring roles as DC Blair Ferguson in the Alibi series Annika, the voice of Caitlyn Kiramman in the Netflix series Arcane, and Ash in the Amazon Prime Video series The Peripheral.

=== 2022–present: Recent and forthcoming roles ===
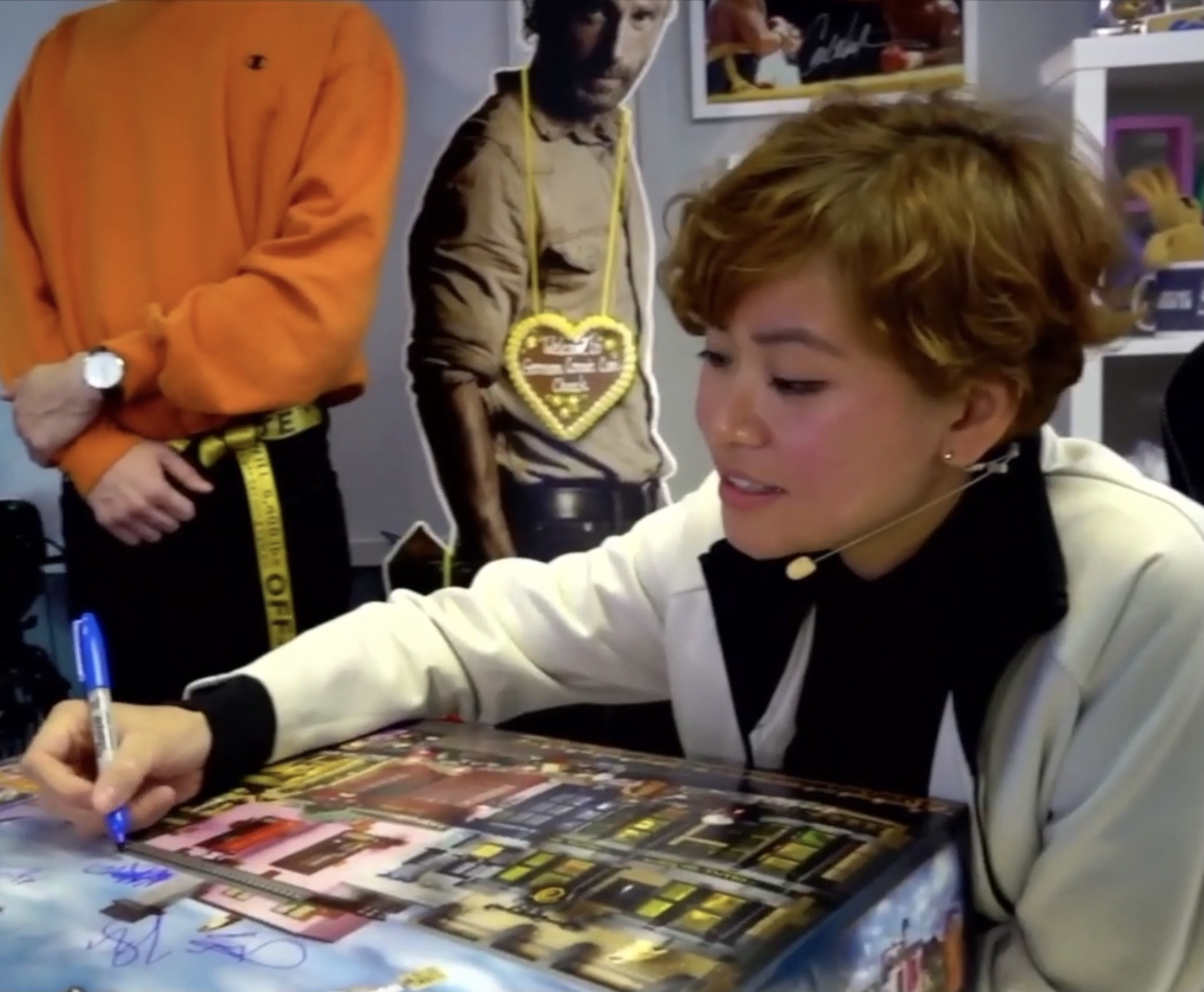
Leung at the German Comic Con Home Edition in 2020

In January 2022, Leung's essay "Getting into Character" was published in the book East Side Voices: Essays Celebrating East & Southeast Asian Identity in Britain. In her essay, Leung wrote about how her ethnicity impacted her experiences growing up and her acting career. In 2023, Leung starred in Paramount+'s series adaptation of Simon Beckett's novel The Chemistry of Death. In 2024, she appeared in the BBC One miniseries Nightsleeper. In 2026, Leung appeared in the fourth season of Bridgerton as Lady Araminta Gun, Countess of Penwood. This will be followed by a key supporting role in the UK-Australia co-produced drama miniseries Careless.

== Personal life ==
Leung speaks fluent Cantonese and basic Mandarin. She is also a vegetarian.

Leung delayed plans to go to art college and university to film Harry Potter and the Order of the Phoenix. During this period, Leung had said she was undecided about pursuing an acting career after Harry Potter and wished to attend university to study art and design. Leung briefly studied painting at University of the Arts London before completing a photography degree at Edinburgh College of Art. Following this, she attended the Royal Conservatoire of Scotland in Glasgow, where she completed the BA in Acting course. Leung was still based in Glasgow as of 2016, but had moved to London by 2018.

On 19 August 2018, Leung participated in the wedding of her Harry Potter castmate Afshan Azad.

On 1 January 2023, for New Year's Day, Leung revealed on Instagram that her son had been born the previous Halloween. Her pregnancy was worked into the second series of Annika, which she filmed prior to giving birth.

=== Charity work ===
In 2007, Leung helped the Prince's Trust charity raise £100,000 by launching a children's art competition, donating one of her own paintings that was auctioned for £960. In 2009, she donated a photo to Sightsavers International's I:Click 2009 competition, with benefits going to treat and prevent blindness for residents of impoverished countries. In 2018, Leung ran a 10K run for My Body Back, a charity that supports victims of sexual violence. She is also a supporter of the Free Palestine movement and has donated to the victims of bombing in Gaza and the West Bank.

== Acting credits ==
Legend
Forthcoming screen and stage performances

=== Film ===
Year	Title	Role	Director
2005	Harry Potter and the Goblet of Fire	Cho Chang	Mike Newell
2007	Harry Potter and the Order of the Phoenix	Cho Chang	David Yates
2009	Harry Potter and the Half-Blood Prince	Cho Chang	David Yates
2010	Harry Potter and the Deathly Hallows – Part 1	Cho Chang	David Yates
2011	Harry Potter and the Deathly Hallows – Part 2	Cho Chang	David Yates
2017	T2 Trainspotting	Nurse	Danny Boyle
2017	The Foreigner	Fan Quan	Martin Campbell
2021	Locked Down	Natasha	Doug Liman

=== Television ===
Year	Title	Role	Notes
2008	Agatha Christie's Poirot	Hsui Tai	Episode: "Cat Among the Pigeons"
2013	Run	Ying	2 episodes
2014	Father Brown	Jia-Li Gerard	Episode: "The Prize of Colonel Gerard"
2014	One Child	Mei Ashley	3 episodes
2018	Leading Lady Parts	Assistant	Television short
2018	The Feast	Hayley	Television short
2018	Strangers	Lau Chen	8 episodes
2019	Chimerica	Liuli	4 episodes
2019	Moominvalley	Too-Ticky	Voice; 2 episodes
2020	The Promise	The Thief	Television short
2020	The Nest	Eleanor	5 episodes
2020	Roadkill	Margaret Moore	3 episodes
2021	Dodo	Additional voices	Voice; 4 episodes
2021–2023	Annika	DC Blair Ferguson	12 episodes
2021–2024	Arcane	Caitlyn Kiramman	Voice; 14 episodes
2022	The Peripheral	Ash	8 episodes
2023	The Chemistry of Death	Maggie Cassidy	4 episodes
2023	The Wheel of Time	Yasicca	Season 2; 3 episodes
2024	Nightsleeper	Rachel Li	6 episodes
2026	Bridgerton	Lady Araminta Gun, Countess of Penwood	Season 4; 8 episodes
2026	Careless	Sheila	4 episodes

=== Theatre ===
Year	Title	Role	Venue
2012	Wild Swans	Jung Chang	Young Vic, London
2013	The World of Extreme Happiness	Sunny	Royal National Theatre, London
2014	The Hypochondriac	Béline	Royal Conservatoire of Scotland, Glasgow
2015	You For Me For You	Junhee	Royal Court Theatre, London
2016	iHo	Sooze	Hampstead Theatre, London
2017	Snow in Midsummer	Dou Yi	Swan Theatre, Stratford-upon-Avon
2019	White Pearl	Sunny	Royal Court Theatre, London
2024	The Comeuppance	Kristina	Almeida Theatre, London
2027	Expecting	Zoey	Riverside Studios, London

=== Video games ===
Year	Title	Role	Notes
2007	Harry Potter and the Order of the Phoenix	Cho Chang	Voice
2009	Harry Potter and the Half-Blood Prince	Cho Chang	Voice
2020	Cyberpunk 2077	Unknown	Voice
2022	Lego Star Wars: The Skywalker Saga	Rose Tico	Voice

=== Audio dramas ===
Year	Title	Role	Director
2024	1984	Ling	Destiny Ekaragha
2025	Flesh and Code	Lily Rose	Unknown

=== Audiobooks ===
Year	Title	Role
2025	Bury Our Bones in the Midnight Soil	Alice
2025	The Ministry of Time	Narrator

=== Music video appearances ===
Year	Song	Artist	Role	Director
2007	Love Coming Home	Leo Ku	Girlfriend	Ricky Hayashi

== Awards and nominations ==
Year	Presenter	Category	Result	Ref.
2006	Asian Excellence Awards	Outstanding Newcomer	Nominated	
2006	Young Scot Awards	Achievement in Entertainment	Nominated	
2007	Scottish Style Awards	Most Stylish Female	Won	
2008	MTV Movie Awards	Best Kiss (with Daniel Radcliffe)	Nominated	
2014	BAFTA	Breakthrough Brit	Won	
2026	BAFTA Scotland Awards	Audience Award (Bridgerton)	Nominated	
