= Mao: The Unknown Story =

2005 biography of Mao Zedong

- First edition cover
- Authors: Jung Chang; Jon Halliday
- Language: English
- Subject: Mao Zedong
- Publisher: Jonathan Cape
- Publication date: 2 June 2005
- Publication place: United Kingdom
- Media type: Print (hardcover)
- Pages: 814
- ISBN: 9780224071260

Mao: The Unknown Story is a revisionist 2005 biography of the Chinese communist leader Mao Zedong (1893–1976) that was written by the husband-and-wife team of the writer Jung Chang and the historian Jon Halliday, who detail Mao's early life, his introduction to the Chinese Communist Party, and his political career. The book frames Mao's life as a transition from a rebel against the autocratic Kuomintang government to the totalitarian dictator over the People's Republic of China. Chang and Halliday heavily cover Mao's role in the planning and the execution of the Great Leap Forward and the Cultural Revolution. They open the book by calling him "Mao Tse-tung" instead of "Mao Zedong", which is the Wade-Giles romanization spelling of his name, while "Mao Zedong" is the modern, official Hanyu Pinyin spelling.

In conducting their research for the book over the course of a decade, the authors interviewed hundreds of people who were close to Mao at some point in his life, used recently-published memoirs from Chinese political figures, and explored newly-opened archives in China and Russia. Chang had herself lived through the turmoil of the Cultural Revolution, which she described in her earlier book Wild Swans (1991).

The book quickly became a best-seller in Europe and North America. It received mostly critical or mixed reviews from academics. Reviews from many China specialists were critical and cite inaccuracies and selectivity in the use of sources and the polemical portrayal of Mao. Some academics were more favorable, as was the popular press.

== Synopsis ==
Chang and Halliday do not accept the idealistic explanations for Mao's rise to power or common claims for his rule. They portray him as a tyrant who manipulated everyone and everything he could in pursuit of personal power. They state that from his earliest years he was motivated by a lust for power and that Mao had many political opponents arrested and murdered, regardless of their relationship with him. During the 1920s and 1930s, they write that Mao could not have gained control of the party without the patronage of Joseph Stalin, the dictator of the Soviet Union, nor were Mao's decisions during the Long March as heroic and ingenious as Edgar Snow's Red Star Over China claimed and thereby entered the mythology of the revolution. Chiang Kai-shek deliberately did not pursue and capture the Red Army.

Areas under Communist control during the Second United Front and Chinese Civil War, such as the Jiangxi and Yan'an soviets, were ruled through terror and financed by opium. They say that Mao sacrificed thousands of troops for the purpose of getting rid of party rivals, such as Zhang Guotao, and he did not take the initiative in fighting the Japanese invaders. Despite being born into a wealthy peasant (kulak) family, Mao had little concern for the welfare of the Chinese peasantry when he came to power in 1949. Mao's determination to use agricultural surplus to subsidize industry and intimidation of dissent led to murderous famines resulting from the Great Leap Forward, exacerbated by allowing the export of grain to continue even when it became clear that China did not have sufficient grain to feed its population.

=== Long March ===
Chang and Halliday said that the Long March was not the courageous effort portrayed by the Chinese Communist Party and that Mao's role in leading it was exaggerated. Chang refers to the march as a myth that has been tweaked and exaggerated throughout the decades by the Chinese government. They write that today the Long March's validity is questionable, because it has diverged so far from reality. Officially portrayed as an inspiring commander, the authors write that he was nearly left behind by the March and only commanded a fairly small force. He was apparently disliked by almost all of the people on the March and his tactics and strategy were flawed. They also write that Chiang Kai-shek allowed the Communists to proceed without significant hindrance. They provided the communists with maps and allowed them to escape the clutches of his army because his son was being held hostage in Moscow and he feared he would be killed if the Communists failed.

Mao is also portrayed, along with the Communist elite, as a privileged person who was usually carried around in litters and protected from the suffering of his subordinates, rather than sharing their hardship. Despite the high level of casualties amongst ordinary soldiers, supposedly no high-ranking leaders died on the journey, regardless of how ill or badly wounded they were. The book says that, contrary to revolutionary mythology, there was no battle at Luding Bridge and that tales of a "heroic" crossing against the odds was merely propaganda. A witness, Li Xiu-zhen, told Chang that she saw no fighting and that the bridge was not on fire. In addition, she said that despite claims by the Communists that the fighting was fierce, all of the vanguard survived the battle. Chang also cited Kuomintang (KNP), the Chinese Nationalist faction during the Chinese Civil War, battleplans and communiques that indicated the force guarding the bridge had been withdrawn before the Communists arrived.

A number of historical works, even outside of China, do depict such a battle, though of less heroic proportions. Harrison E. Salisbury's The Long March: The Untold Story and Charlotte Salisbury's Long March Diary mention a battle at Luding Bridge, but they relied on second-hand information; however, there is disagreement in other sources over the incident. Chinese journalist Sun Shuyun agreed that the official accounts were exaggerated. She interviewed a local blacksmith who had witnessed the event and said that "when [the troops opposing the Red Army] saw the soldiers coming, they panicked and fled — their officers had long abandoned them. There wasn't really much of a battle." Archives in Chengdu further supported this claim.

In October 2005, The Age newspaper reported that it had been unable to find Chang's local witness. In addition, The Sydney Morning Herald found an 85-year-old eyewitness, Li Guixiu, aged 15 at the time of the crossing, whose account disputed Chang's claims. According to Li, there was a battle: "The fighting started in the evening. There were many killed on the Red Army side. The KMT set fire to the bridge-house on the other side, to try to melt the chains, and one of the chains was cut. After it was taken, the Red Army took seven days and seven nights to cross." In a speech given at Stanford University earlier in March 2005, former U.S. National Security Advisor Zbigniew Brzezinski mentioned a conversation that he once had with Deng Xiaoping. He recalled that Deng smiled and said: "Well, that's the way it's presented in our propaganda. We needed that to express the fighting spirit of our forces. In fact, it was a very easy military operation."

=== Opium production ===
The book claims that Mao did not just tolerate the production of opium in regions that the Communists controlled during the Chinese Civil War but participated in the trade of it as well to provide funding for his soldiers. According to Russian sources that the authors state they found, at the time the trade generated around $60 million a year for the Communists. This was stopped only due to overproduction driving down the price and Communist officials other than Mao deciding that the practice was immoral.

=== Campaigns against Mao's opponents ===
Mao is alleged to have exposed men under his command to unnecessary suffering just to eliminate his opponents. Zhang Guotao, a rival in the Politburo, was sent with his army in 1936 on a hopeless mission into the Gobi Desert. When it inevitably failed Mao ordered that the survivors be executed. Chang and Halliday suggest that Mao used other underhanded means in eliminating opponents. Apart from general purges like the Hundred Flowers Campaign and other operations like the Cultural Revolution, he had Wang Ming (another Politburo rival) poisoned twice; Wang had to seek treatment in Russia.

=== Sino-Japanese War ===
Chang and Halliday write that contra official history provided by the Chinese authorities that Communist forces waged a tough guerrilla war against the Imperial Japanese Army, in truth they rarely fought the Japanese. Mao was more interested in saving his forces for fighting against the Chinese Nationalists. On the few occasions that the Communists did fight the Japanese, Mao was very angry.

=== Communist sleeper agents ===
Notable members of the KMT were claimed to have been secretly working for the Chinese Communists. One such sleeper agent was Hu Zongnan, a senior National Revolutionary Army general. Hu's son objected to this description and his threat of legal action led Chang's publishers in Taiwan to abandon the release of the book there.

=== Korean War ===
Rather than reluctantly entering the Korean War as the Chinese government suggests, Mao is shown to have deliberately entered the conflict, having promised Chinese troops to Kim Il Sung (then leader of North Korea) before the conflict started. Also, the book details Mao's desperation in needing economic and military aid promised by the Soviets, as the prime motivating factor in backing Kim Il-sung's invasion of South Korea. Halliday had previously conducted research into this conflict, publishing his book Korea: The Unknown War.

=== Number of deaths under Mao ===
The book opens with the sentence: "Mao Tse-tung, who for decades held absolute power over the lives of one-quarter of the world's population, was responsible for well over 70 million deaths in peacetime, more than any other twentieth century leader." He referred to the peasants as "two shoulders and a bum" because at any given time they could be killed but even more would be left alive. Chang and Halliday say that he was willing for half of China to die to achieve military-nuclear superpowerdom. Estimates of the numbers of deaths during this period vary, though Chang and Halliday's estimate is one of the highest. In a review of the book, sinologist Stuart Schram wrote that "the exact figure ... has been estimated by well-informed writers at between 40 and 70 million."

China scholars agree that the famine during the Great Leap Forward caused tens of millions of deaths but disagree on the exact number, which may be significantly lower or higher but within that same range. Chang and Halliday write that this period accounts for roughly half of the 70 million total. An official estimate by Chinese Communist Party's high-ranking official Hu Yaobang in 1980 put the death toll at 20 million, whereas Mao's biographer Philip Short in his 2000 book Mao: A Life found 20 to 30 million to be the most credible number. Chang and Halliday's figure is 37.67 million, which historian Stuart Schram indicated that he believes "may well be the most accurate." Yang Jisheng, a Communist party member and former reporter for Xinhua, puts the number of famine deaths at 36 million. In his 2010 book Mao's Great Famine, Hong Kong-based historian Frank Dikötter, who has had access to newly opened local archives, places the death toll for the Great Leap Forward at 45 million, and describes it as "one of the most deadly mass killings of human history." Dikötter's historical revisionist work has been criticized by mainstream China scholars for his problematic use of sources, including criticism by Short.

In 2005, political scientist Rudolph Rummel published updated figures on worldwide democide, stating that he believed Chang and Halliday's estimates to be mostly correct, and he had revised his figures for China under Mao accordingly. While Rummel's general conclusions remain relevant, his estimates of democide remain on the high-end of the spectrum and have been criticized by scholars as biased, inflated, or otherwise unreliable, and his methodology has been questioned.

== Reception and impact ==
Mao: The Unknown Story became a bestseller, with United Kingdom sales alone reaching 60,000 in six months. Academics were generally though not uniformly critical, while the popular press was more positive.

=== Positive ===
The book has received praise from a number of commentators and academic experts. Popular history author Simon Sebag Montefiore lauded the book in The Times, calling Chang and Halliday's work "a triumph" which "exposes its subject as probably the most disgusting of the bloody troika of 20th-century tyrant-messiahs, in terms of character, deeds — and number of victims. ... This is the first intimate, political biography of the greatest monster of them all — the Red Emperor of China." In The New York Times, journalist Nicholas Kristof referred to the book as a "magisterial work"; Kristof said that it did a better job demonstrating that Mao was a "catastrophic ruler" than anything else written to date. In his words, "Mao's ruthlessness was ... brilliantly captured in this extraordinary book ... ." Journalist Gwynne Dyer praised the book for documenting "Mao's crimes and failures in unrelenting, unprecedented detail", and stated he believed it would eventually have a similar impact in China as Aleksandr Solzhenitsyn's The Gulag Archipelago did in the Soviet Union.

Historian Max Hastings said the book is a "savage indictment, drawing on a host of sources including important Soviet ones, to blow away the miasma of deceit and ignorance which still shrouds Mao's life from many Western eyes." Its weakness is that "it attributes Mao's rise and long rule entirely to repression, and does not explain why so many of his own people remained for so long committed to his insane vision." Michael Yahuda, Professor of International Relations at the London School of Economics, also expressed his support in The Guardian. He referred to it as a "magnificent book" and "a stupendous work" which cast "new and revealing light on nearly every episode in Mao's tumultuous life."

Professor Richard Baum of the University of California, Los Angeles, said that "it has to be taken very seriously as the most thoroughly researched and richly documented piece of synthetic scholarship yet to appear on the rise of Mao and the CCP." Even if "not a sufficiently rich or nuanced interpretive scaffolding to support the full weight of the Chinese experience under Mao", Baum still believed that "this book will most likely change forever the way modern Chinese history is understood and taught."

Perry Link, then a Princeton University Professor of Chinese literature, praised the book in The Times Literary Supplement and emphasized the effect the book could have in the West, writing: "Part of Chang and Halliday's passion for exposing the 'unknown' Mao is clearly aimed at gullible Westerners. ... For decades many in the Western intellectual and political elites have assumed that Mao and his heirs symbolize the Chinese people and their culture, and that to show respect to the rulers is the same as showing respect to the subjects. Anyone who reads Jung Chang and Jon Halliday's book should be inoculated against this particular delusion. If the book sells even half as many copies as the 12 million of Wild Swans, it could deliver the coup de grace to an embarrassing and dangerous pattern of Western thinking."

=== Mixed ===
While criticizing certain aspects of the book, Stuart Schram, author of the Cambridge History's biography of Mao, wrote in a review in The China Quarterly that Chang and Halliday's book was "a valuable contribution to our understanding of Mao and his place in history." Schram offered nuances to translation, ulterior passages within selected texts, and criticisms that suggested the authors were not without significant bias in their structuring of the work and representation of Mao's views. Professor Andrew J. Nathan of Columbia University published an extensive evaluation of the book in the London Review of Books. While praising aspects of the book, stating that it "shows special insight into the suffering of Mao's wives and children", and acknowledged that it might make real contributions to the field, Nathan's review was largely negative. He wrote that "many of their discoveries come from sources that cannot be checked, others are openly speculative or are based on circumstantial evidence, and some are untrue." Professor Jonathan Spence of Yale University said in the New York Review of Books that the authors' single focus on Mao's vileness had undermined "much of the power their story might have had."

=== Criticism ===
Chang and Halliday's book has been strongly criticized by various academics. In December 2005, The Observer stated that many knowledgeable academics of the field have questioned the factual accuracy of some of Chang and Halliday's claims, notably their selective use of evidence, questioning their stance in the matter, among other criticisms; the article also said that Chang and Halliday's critics did not deny Mao's monstrous actions.

David S. G. Goodman, Professor of Chinese Politics at the University of Sydney, wrote in The Pacific Review that the book, like other examples of historical revisionism, implied that there had been "a conspiracy of academics and scholars who have chosen not to reveal the truth." Goodman stated that as popular history the book's style was "extremely polemic" and he was highly critical of Chang and Halliday's methodology and use of sources as well as specific conclusions. Professor Thomas Bernstein of Columbia University referred to the book as "a major disaster for the contemporary China field" because the "scholarship is put at the service of thoroughly destroying Mao's reputation. The result is an equally stupendous number of quotations out of context, distortion of facts and omission of much of what makes Mao a complex, contradictory, and multi-sided leader."

The China Journal invited a group of specialists to give assessments of the book in the area of their expertise. Professors Gregor Benton and Steve Tsang wrote that Chang and Halliday "misread sources, use them selectively, use them out of context, or otherwise trim or bend them to cast Mao in an unrelentingly bad light." Timothy Cheek (University of British Columbia) said that the book is "not a history in the accepted sense of a reasoned historical analysis", and rather it "reads like an entertaining Chinese version of a TV soap opera." University of California at Berkeley political scientist Lowell Dittmer added that "surely the depiction is overdrawn" but what emerges is a story of "absolute power", leading first to personal corruption in the form of sexual indulgence and paranoia, and secondly to policy corruption, consisting of the power to realize "fantastic charismatic visions and ignore negative feedback ... ." Geremie Barmé (Australian National University) stated that while "anyone familiar with the lived realities of the Mao years can sympathize with the authors' outrage", one must ask whether "a vengeful spirit serves either author or reader well, especially in the creation of a mass market work that would claim authority and dominance in the study of Mao Zedong and his history." Barmé criticizes Chang and Halliday for what he characterizes as their glib use of imperial metaphors to describe Mao, writing that the text "places Mao "at some quaint, incomprehensible oriental remove, reducing a complex history to one of personal fiat and imperial hauteur."

The 2009 anthology Was Mao Really a Monster: The Academic Response to Chang and Halliday's "Mao: The Unknown Story", edited by Gregor Benton and Lin Chun, brings together fourteen mostly critical previously published academic responses, including the reviews from China Journal. Benton and Lin write in their introduction that "unlike the worldwide commercial media, ... most professional commentary has been disapproving." They challenge the assertion that Mao was responsible for 70 million deaths, since the number's origin is vague and substantiation shaky. They include an extensive list of further reviews. Gao Mobo, of the University of Adelaide, wrote that Mao: The Unknown Story was "intellectually scandalous", saying that it "misinterprets evidence, ignores the existing literature, and makes sensationalist claims without proper evidence."

Writing for the Marxist New Left Review, British historian Tariq Ali criticized the book for its focus "on Mao's conspicuous imperfections (political and sexual), exaggerating them to fantastical heights, and advancing moral criteria for political leaders that they would never apply to a Roosevelt or a Kennedy"; Ali accused the book of including unsourced and unproven claims, including archival material from Mao's political opponents in Taiwan and the Soviet Union whose reliability are disputed, as well as celebrity interviewees, such as Lech Wałęsa, whose knowledge of Mao and China are limited. Ali compared the book's sensationalist passages and denunciations of Mao to Mao's own political slogans during the Cultural Revolution.

Historian Rebecca Karl summarizes: "According to many reviewers of Mao: The Unknown Story, the story told therein is unknown because Chang and Halliday substantially fabricated it or exaggerated it into existence."

==== Response to criticism ====
In December 2005, an article by The Observer newspaper on the book contained a brief statement from Chang and Halliday in regards to the general criticism. The authors said that "the academics' views on Mao and Chinese history cited represent received wisdom of which we were well aware while writing our biography of Mao. We came to our own conclusions and interpretations of events through a decade's research." They responded to sinologist Andrew J. Nathan's review in a letter to the London Review of Books. Nathan replied to the authors' response, below their letter in the same issue of that journal, his letter including the following points: "Most of Jung Chang and Jon Halliday's complaints fall into two overlapping categories: I did not check enough sources; I misinterpreted what they or their sources said. ... Chang and Halliday's method of citation makes it necessary for the reader to check multiple sources in order to track down the basis for any single assertion. There were many passages in their book which I had doubts about that I could not check because the sources were anonymous, unpublished, or simply too hard to get. It's true that I did not visit the Wang Ming papers in Russia or telephone the Japanese Communist Party. Is Chang and Halliday's invitation to do this a fair substitute for citations to the documents they used – author, title, date, and where seen? I limited my published criticisms to those for which I was able to get hold of what appeared to be all the sources."

The London Review of Books published the historian Donald Gillies' letter a few weeks later, responding to Nathan's review. According to Gillies, Chang and Halliday allege in their book that former British ambassador to China Archibald Clark Kerr was a Soviet agent. Regarding this, Gillies’ letter states: "the only relevant text referenced is my own biography of Clark Kerr in which I took considerable pains to dismiss this unfair allegation. What is the point of their bald citation of a text that expressly negates the point they try to make? If this is symptomatic of their overall approach, then I am not surprised that they should find themselves under attack from Andrew Nathan. The issue is not Mao's character and deeds but the ethics of biography."

About some of the critics of the book, sociologist Paul Hollander said: "While some of the critiques of Chang and Halliday were reasonable—especially of the over-emphasis on personality at the expense of other factors and the neglect of competing scholarly sources—the vehemence of the critics' indignation calls into question their scholarly impartiality. ... It cannot be ruled out that the great commercial success of such a supposedly flawed book also interfered with its dispassionate evaluation by some of these authors. ... Most problematic has been the argument repeatedly made ... that Mao's defects, or crimes, must be weighed against his accomplishments. ... Can they balance the loss of millions of lives as a result of profoundly wrongheaded policies (such as the Great Leap Forward and the Cultural Revolution), regardless of their supposed objectives?"

== Publication ==
=== English ===
- Chang, Jung., Halliday, Jon. Mao: The Unknown Story. London: Jonathan Cape. 2 June 2005 ISBN 0224071262
- Chang, Jung; Halliday, Jon (2005). Mao: The Unknown Story. New York: Knopf. ISBN 0679422714. 18 October 2005 ISBN 0679422714

In July 2005, the book was on The Sunday Times bestseller list at No. 2.

=== Chinese ===
- Open Magazine Publishing (Hong Kong) Publication date: 6 September 2006 ISBN 9627934194

== References and further reading ==
- Leese, Daniel (September 2007). "The Pitfalls of Demonisation – Mao: The Unknown Story and its Medial Repercussions". Totalitarian Movements and Political Religions. 8 (3–4): 677–682. doi:10.1080/14690760701571320. ISSN 1469-0764. S2CID 144337070.
- "Homo sanguinarius", The Economist, 26 May 2005
- "This book will shake the world" by Lisa Allardice, The Guardian, 26 May 2005
- "Too much hate, too little understanding" by Frank McLynn, The Independent on Sunday, 5 June 2005
- "The long march to evil" by Roy Hattersley, The Observer, 5 June 2005
- "The inhuman touch - Mao: The Unknown Story" by Richard McGregor, The Financial Times, 17 June 2005
- China experts attack biography's 'misleading' sources by Jonathan Fenby, The Observer, 4 December 2005
- "Mao: A Super Monster?" by Alfred Chan, Pacific Affairs (2006, vol. 79, No. 2)
- "China's Monster, Second to None" by Michiko Kakutani, The New York Times, 21 October 2005
- "The Mao That Roared" by Adi Ignatius, Time, 23 October 2005

== See also ==
- The Private Life of Chairman Mao
- Red Star Over China
