= Empress Dowager Cixi: The Concubine Who Launched Modern China =

2013 biography on Empress Dowager Cixi

- Author: Jung Chang
- Language: English
- Subject: Biography
- Set in: China
- Publisher: Alfred A. Knopf
- Publication date: 2013
- Publication place: United Kingdom
- Pages: 436
- ISBN: 9780307271600

Empress Dowager Cixi: The Concubine Who Launched Modern China is a 2013 biography written by Jung Chang, published by Alfred A. Knopf. Chang presents a sympathetic portrait of the Empress Dowager Cixi, who unofficially controlled the Manchu Qing dynasty in China for 47 years, from 1861 to her death in 1908. Chang argues that Cixi has been "deemed either tyrannical and vicious, or hopelessly incompetent—or both", and that this view is both simplistic and inaccurate. Chang portrays her as intelligent, open-minded, and a proto-feminist limited by a xenophobic and deeply conservative imperial bureaucracy. Although Cixi is often accused of reactionary conservatism (especially for her treatment of the Guangxu Emperor during and after the Hundred Days' Reform), Chang concludes that Cixi "brought medieval China into the modern age."

Newspaper reviews were positive in their assessment. Te-Ping Chen, writing in The Wall Street Journal, found the book "packed with details that bring to life its central character". Specialists, however, were sometimes less favorable, arguing that Chang had not read recent work in the field or made critical use of Chinese-language sources.

The work has been translated into Chinese, Danish, Dutch, French, Finnish, German, Italian, Japanese, Polish, Portuguese, Russian, and Swedish.

== Reception ==
Katie Baker wrote in The Daily Beast, that the work shows that "the past hundred years have been most unfair to Cixi" and that "the political forces that have dominated China since soon after her death have also deliberately reviled her or blacked out her accomplishments… [but] in terms of groundbreaking achievements, political sincerity and personal courage, Empress Dowager Cixi set a standard that has barely been matched."

The New York Times reported that a number of historians were wary of Chang's conclusions, however, because the book was so laudatory of Cixi. China expert Orville Schell called Chang's biography "absorbing" although sometimes bordering on hagiography. He had high praise for Chang's extensive use of Chinese-language sources, both primary and modern, which have rarely been used in English-language biographers of Cixi. John Delury, assistant professor of Chinese studies at Yonsei University in South Korea, also had praise for Chang's use of new Chinese-language sources. But he cautioned that the book assessed so positively nearly everything that Cixi did that the sources may not have been objectively assessed. He implied that Chang's book was neither very scholarly nor very careful in its use of sources. Mass media reviewers have been similarly distrustful because of the book's overwhelmingly positive tone. James Owne in The Daily Telegraph felt Chang "airbrushed" Cixi, concluding: "One can see why she has fallen in love with her spirited subject, but the woman who ended the custom of foot-binding was capable of great cruelty and stupidity of her own. The smell of blood needs to be acknowledged, not just that of lilies."

Isabel Hilton in The Guardian found Chang's praise for Cixi "a little unqualified". She points out, for example, that Cixi crushed the Guangxu Emperor's Hundred Days' Reform in 1898, but then implemented many more reforms after the Boxer Rebellion. Hilton observes that Chang interprets Cixi's actions in the most positive light possible, and emblematic of Cixi's progressive views. Other historians have interpreted these actions as those of a ruler who wants to cling to power, and whose post-Boxer Rebellion policies were "grudging concessions." But she applauded the book for making "a spirited, if partisan contribution" to the literature on Cixi.

Pamela Kyle Crossley said in the London Review of Books that Chang Jung's claims for Cixi "seem to be minted from her own musings, and have little to do with what we know was actually going in China." Because she does not know the recent Western scholarship, Chang misunderstands, for instance, Cixi's role in the Boxer Uprising. Crossley says the book depicts all who opposed Cixi's declaration of war as "cowardly, corrupt or in actual collusion with one or another of the foreign powers." Crossley says that it is long proven that chief provincial officials simply ignored her orders, and when the Eight Allied Armies invaded, she was two weeks journey away, in Xi'an; Chang does not realize that decisions in the capital were made by Ronglu, and that only his intervention with the victorious Allies kept them from executing her as a Boxer supporter. Although Crossley was sympathetic to restoring women's place in Chinese history, she found "rewriting Cixi as Catherine the Great or Margaret Thatcher is a poor bargain: the gain of an illusory icon at the expense of historical sense."

In a review for the Financial Times, historian Jeffrey Wasserstrom wrote that Chang provided solid arguments for seeing Cixi as an unusual and extraordinary woman and for pushing back against histories that characterized her as an enemy of progress but failed to make a case for seeing Cixi as a "wise moderniser" ahead of her time. He argued that Chang over-emphasized evidence supporting her claims while downplaying evidence against them and felt that the passages describing Cixi's internal thoughts were too speculative, comparing her work unfavorably to Cleopatra: A Life by Stacy Schiff.
