= Pavan Amara =

Women's rights activist based in UK

Pavan Amara is a student nurse, journalist and women's rights activist based in London. She is the founder of the My Body Back Project.

== Activism ==
In her teens Amara was raped. Afterwards, she found certain life experiences such as visiting a doctor difficult. She looked for help, typing ‘rape, body image, can’t go to doctor’ into Google Search. Whilst working as a student nurse, she interviewed thirty women who had experienced sexual assault and discovered that she was not the only person who sometimes had difficulties. All the women told her it was hard to enjoy sexual intercourse, they had problems looking in the mirror and had issues with access to healthcare. For example, a woman told her that the person who assaulted her had said "If you relax it'll be over with quicker" and when a healthcare professional said the same words it brought back the original trauma.

Amara founded the My Body Back Project in London in August 2014, intending to set up a website and create a support network for survivors of sexual assault. One year later, the project began a clinic at St Bart's Hospital in London dedicated to survivors of sexual assault. The clinic was set up as a result of asking women what they wanted and its success meant that the idea was quickly proposed to make it a nationwide service.

== Recognition ==
Theresa May, at the time Prime Minister, wrote to Amara that "Through sheer determination you have established the UK's first sexual health and maternity clinic for women who have experienced sexual violence. The success of the 'My Body Back Project' is testament to your extraordinary dedication to supporting vulnerable women and you should feel proud of everything the project has achieved."

Amara was listed as one of the ten "brightest and best" feminists by The Independent newspaper in 2015. She writes for the Huffington Post, Independent and other publications. In 2019, she was listed as Stylist magazine 'Woman of the Week'.
