= Gavan McCormack =

Australian academic

- Awards: Fellow of the Australian Academy of the Humanities (1992); Ryukyu Shimpo Ikemiyagi Shui Prize (2008)

Academic background
- Education: University of Melbourne (BA, LLB); University of London (MA, PhD)
- Thesis: Chang Tso-lin, the Mukden Military Clique, and Japan, 1920–1928: The Development and interrelationships of Chinese warlordism and Japanese imperialism in northeast China (1974)

Academic work
- Institutions: Australian National University; University of Adelaide; La Trobe University; University of Leeds
- Main interests: Modern East Asian history, particularly Japan

Gavan McCormack FAHA is a researcher specializing in East Asia who is Emeritus Professor and Visiting Fellow, Division of Pacific and Asian History of the Australian National University. He is also a coordinator of an award-winning open access journal The Asia-Pacific Journal: Japan Focus.

== Academic career ==
McCormack read Law and Arts at the University of Melbourne from 1955 to 1959, then spent the years 1960–1962 completing an MA in history. He spent the 1962–1963 academic year at Osaka University of Foreign Studies (OUFS), where he took a Diploma in Japanese Language and Culture. From 1963 to 1966 he studied Chinese at the School of Oriental and African Studies (SOAS) in London, taking a second-class degree. He then spent two years completing a second MA at SOAS in Area Studies (Far East). From 1969 to 1974 he worked on a PhD at SOAS. His thesis was Chang Tso-lin, the Mukden Military Clique, and Japan, 1920–1928: The Development and interrelationships of Chinese warlordism and Japanese imperialism in northeast China. It was later published as a book.

McCromack's academic career took him to the University of Leeds in the United Kingdom, then to La Trobe University in Victoria, Australia, and eventually to the University of Adelaide in South Australia. In 1990 he was appointed Professor in Japanese at the Australian National University. He was elected a Fellow of the Australian Academy of the Humanities in 1992.

McCormack's main research interest is "modern Japanese (and East Asian) political, intellectual, and environmental history". He has published widely in both academic and popular journals on the "liberation" struggles in South East Asia. In more recent times he has become more interested in environmental issues and in 1996 he published The Emptiness of Japanese Affluence, in which he attacked Japanese economic success as a mirage based on environmental exploitation that posed the single greatest threat to stability in the region. He has been a critic of the American government in general and has claimed that North Korea's efforts to obtain nuclear weapons are justified by American belligerence.

He has been a visiting professor at Kobe University, Kyoto University, Ritsumeikan University, Tsukuba University, International Christian University and Tokyo Institute of Technology.

== Editorial career ==
Gavan McCormack had contributed as a guest editorial staff of the South Korean newspaper, Kyunghyang Shinmun from December 2007 to December 2009.

== Select bibliography ==
=== Books ===
- Japanese Imperialism Today: Co-prosperity in Greater East Asia (co-authored with Jon Halliday), London and New York, Penguin and Monthly Review Press, 1974, 279 pp. ISBN 0-14-021669-3.
- Crisis in Korea, co-edited with John Gittings, Nottingham, the Russell Press, Spokesman University Paperback No.17, 1977; 190 pp. ISBN 0-85124-186-7.
- Chang Tso-lin in Northeast China, 1911–1928: China, Japan and the Manchurian Idea, Stanford University Press, 1977, 334 pp. ISBN 0-8047-0945-9.
- Korea North and South, co-edited with Mark Selden, New York, Monthly Review Press, 1978, 240 pp.
- Twice Victims: Koreans at Hiroshima, edited and introduced, jointly translated from Japanese with Kang Ok Su, Tokyo, The Korean Peace Committee in Japan, 1981, 44 pp.
- Cold War Hot War: An Australian Perspective on the Korean War, Sydney, Hale and Iremonger, 1983; 191 pp ISBN 0-86806-082-8, ISBN 0-86806-083-6 (pbk).
- The Price of Affluence: Dilemmas of Contemporary Japan, translator-in-chief and editor of Rokuro Hidaka's Sengo Shiso o Kangaeru (Tokyo), Iwanami, 1980). Tokyo and New York, Kodansha International, 1984
- Japanese Society: Ins and Outs in Showa 60, translated and edited by Gavan McCormack and Yoshio Sugimoto, Papers of the Japanese Studies Centre, Melbourne, No. 8, December 1986, 30 pp.
- Democracy in Contemporary Japan, co-edited with Yoshio Sugimoto, Sydney, Hale and Iremonger, and New York, M.E. Sharpe, 1986, 272 pp ISBN 0-87332-397-1, ISBN 0-87332-398-X (pbk).
- The Japanese Trajectory: Modernization and Beyond, co-edited with Yoshio Sugimoto. Cambridge University Press, 1988, 300 pp ISBN 0-521-34515-4.
- Bonsai Australia Banzai: Multifunctionpolis and the Making of a Special Relationship with Japan, Gavan McCormack, ed., Pluto Press, Sydney, 1991, 228pp.
- The Burma-Thailand Railway: memory and history, (co-edited with Hank Nelson), ed, Sydney, Allen and Unwin, 1993, 175pp ISBN 9781863734233.
- Korea Since 1850, (co-authored with Stewart Lone), Melbourne, Longman Cheshire, and New York, St. Martin's Press, 1993, 226 pp. ISBN 0-582-87111-5, ISBN 0-312-09685-2.
- Peace and Regional Security in the Asia-Pacific: A Japanese Proposal, translated, edited and introduced, Peace Research Centre, Research School of Pacific Studies, ANU, Working Paper No 158, September 1995, 59pp.
- The Emptiness of Japanese Affluence, Armonk, New York: M.E. Sharpe, 311pp. 1996. (Co-published with Allen and Unwin, Sydney). ISBN 1-56324-711-9, ISBN 1-56324-712-7 (pbk).
- Multicultural Japan: Palaeolithic to Postmodern, Cambridge, Cambridge University Press, 1996. (co-edited with Donald Denoon, Mark Hudson, and Tessa Morris-Suzuki). 296 pp. ISBN 0-521-55067-X
- (with Glenn Hook), Japan's Contested Constitution – documents and analysis, London and New York, Routledge, 2001, 212 pages. ISBN 0-415-24099-9 (hbk), ISBN 0-415-24100-6 (pbk).
- Target North Korea: Pushing North Korea to the Brink of Nuclear Catastrophe, New York, Nation Books, and Sydney, Random House Australia, 2004. 228 pp. ISBN 1-56025-557-9.

=== Articles and book chapters ===
- "Some Radical Utopian Movements in Early Europe and China" in Afrasian, School of Oriental and African Studies, University of London, 1969, pp. 16–22.
- "The student left in Japan". New Left Review. I (65). New Left Review: 37–53. January–February 1971.

Reproduced in part in McCormack, Gavin (1973), "The student left in Japan", in Livingston, Jon; Oldfather, Felicia; Moore, Joe (eds.), The Japan Reader, volume 2, Pantheon, pp. 552–556, ISBN 9780394706689.

- "The Tokyo-Taipei-Seoul Nexus" (with Jon Halliday) in Journal of Contemporary Asia, Vol.2, No.1, Spring 1972, pp. 36–55.
- "Japan and America: antagonistic alliance". New Left Review. I (77). New Left Review: 59–76. January–February 1973. (With Jon Halliday.)
- "The Politics of Korean Studies in Europe" in Journal of Contemporary Asia, Vol.7, No.3, 1977, pp. 387–392.
- "The South Korean Phenomenon" in Australian Outlook, published by the Australian Institute of International Affairs, Vol.32, No.3, December 1978, pp. 262–278.
- "The Kampuchean Revolution, 1975–1978, The Problem of Knowing the Truth" in Arena (Melbourne), No.53, September 1979, pp. 40–82.
- Revised and expanded version in Journal of Contemporary Asia, Vol.10, 1–2, 1980, pp. 75–118.
- "Kampuchea: Nationalism, Intervention, Revolution", Working Paper No.11, Antropologisch-Sociologisch Centrum, Universiteit van Amsterdam, 1982
- "Cambodia: Rationale for a Rural Policy" (review article) in Journal of Contemporary Asia, Vol.11, No.2, 1981, pp. 231–236.
- "Korea North and South" in Arena (Melbourne), 56, pp. 34–40, November 1980.
- "Letter from Pyongyang" in Far Eastern Economic Review, 15 August 1980.
- "1930's Japan: Fascist?" in Social Analysis (Adelaide), No.5/6 December 1980, pp. 125–43, also in Bulletin of Concerned Asian Scholars, 14, 2, April–June 1982, pp. 20–33.
- "North Korea: Kimilsungism – Path to Socialism?" in Bulletin of Concerned Asian Scholars, 13, 4, October–December 1981, pp. 50–61.
- "The Reunification of Korea: Problems and Prospects" in Pacific Affairs (Vancouver: University of British Columbia), 55, 1, pp. 5–31, Spring 1982.
- "Yellow Rain" (review article discussing Grant Evans' The Yellow Rainmakers: Are Chemical Weapons being used in Southeast Asia? in Arena, No.66, 1984, pp. 196–205).
- "Koizumi's coup". New Left Review. II (35). New Left Review. September–October 2005.
