= Glenn Hook =

Glenn Dawson Hook (born 1949) is a British academic, author and Professor of Japanese Politics and International Relations, University of Sheffield.

== Early life ==
Hook earned a 1997 Ph.D. in Political Science at Chuo University in Tokyo.

His studies at the University of British Columbia led to 1973 BA degree and a 1974 MA degree in political science. His master's thesis examined the normalization of Japan-China relations and the external and internal influences on Japan's foreign policy-making process. He continued his studies with post-graduate work at Osaka University of Foreign Studies and at the Inter-University Center for Japanese Language Studies at Stanford University in 1975–1977.

== Career ==
Hook is a faculty member of the University of Sheffield. He is Director of the National Institute of Japanese Studies (NIJS). He is also Director of Research (Regionalisation and Globalisation cluster) at the White Rose East Asia Center in Sheffield.

Some of his research interests include:

- Japan's role in the restructuring of the East Asian political economy ... spatial scales of order at the regional, subregional and microregional levels ... the role of both state and nonstate actors in the political, economic and security dimensions of regional relations and how new orders and sites of governance emerge in the process of global and regional transformations.
- Japanese defence and security policy ...the realist approach dominant in the field contrasts with domestic constraints imposed on the policy-making process, examining issues of structure, agency and particularly norms in determining security policy.
- Role of the Japanese state in mediating risk ... collaborative work analysing the way the state mediates both internal and external risks and how this impacts on the security of the citizen.

== Selected works ==
Hook's published writings encompass 59 works in 190 publications in 3 languages and 3,447 library holdings.

- Japanese Politics (1982)
- Language and Politics: the Security Discourse in Japan and the United States (言語と政治, Gengo to seiji; 1986), with Takeshi Hashiuchi
- Militarization in Contemporary Japan: the Erosion of Anti-Militaristic Principles (1988)
- The Internationalization of Japan (1992)
- Militarization and Demilitarization in Contemporary Japan (1996)
- Japanese Business Management: Restructuring for Low Growth and Globalization (1997)
- Subregionalism and World Order (1999)
- Japan's Contested Constitution: Documents and Analysis (2000), with Gavan McCormack
- Japan's International Relations: Politics, Economics, and Security (2000)
- The Political Economy of Japanese Globalization (2001)
- Microregionalism and World Order (2002)
- Japan and Okinawa: Structure and Subjectivity (2002)
- Japan and Britain in the Contemporary World Responses to Common Issues (2003)
- Japan and the Emerging Asia Pacific Order (2003)
- Contested Governance in Japan: Sites and Issues (2005)
- Japanese Business and Management (現代日本企業, Gendai Nihon kigyō; 2005), with Kudō Akira and Kikkawa Takeo
- Japanese Responses to Globalization: Politics, Security, Economics and Business (2006)
- Global Governance and Japan: the Institutional Architecture (2007)
