= One Child (TV series) =

2014 British TV drama miniseries

- Genre: Drama
- Written by: Guy Hibbert
- Directed by: John Alexander
- Starring: Katie Leung; Elizabeth Perkins; Donald Sumpter
- Countries of origin: United Kingdom; Hong Kong
- Original language: English

Production
- Producer: Hilary Salmon
- Cinematography: Matt Gray BSC
- Production company: Sundance TV

Original release
- Network: Sundance TV
- Release: 5 December – 6 December 2014

One Child is a 2014 BBC and Sundance TV threepart drama. Following its initial two-night premiere on Sundance TV, it aired as part of the BBC's China season in 2016, where it was shown over three sixty-minute episodes. The series follows a girl called Mei Ashley (Katie Leung) who discovers that she has a brother, Li Jun (Sebastian So), that she never knew about and that he is due to be sentenced to death for a murder he did not commit.

== Cast ==
- Katie Leung as Mei Ashley, a girl who finds she has a brother.
- Donald Sumpter as Jim Ashley, Mei's adoptive father.
- Elizabeth Perkins as Katherine Ashley, Mei's adoptive mother.
- Mardy Ma as Liu Ying, Mei's biological mother.
- Sebastian So as Li Jun, Mei's brother.
- Linh Dan Pham as Pan Qianyi, a journalist.
- Junix Inocian as Lin Zhouqing, a private detective.
- Harry Wong as Guan Xiaopeng, the murderer.
- Selina Lo as Xu Lian, witness to the murder.

== Episodes ==
One Child aired in sixty-minute episodes for its UK release, but originally aired in ninety-minute episodes as a two-night special event. For its digital release on streaming platforms, it has retained the three-episode format presented here.

No.	Title	Directed by	Written by	Original release date
1	"Episode One"	John Alexander	Guy Hibbert	17 February 2016 (UK)
Mei was adopted from China as a baby by parents living in the United Kingdom. She gets a message from a Chinese journalist called Pan Qianyi telling her that she has a brother who is due to be executed for a crime he did not commit.
2	"Episode Two"	John Alexander	Guy Hibbert	24 February 2016 (UK)
Mei hires a private detective, Lin Zhouqing, to make the witnesses change their police statements to the truth.
3	"Episode Three"	John Alexander	Guy Hibbert	2 March 2016 (UK)
The final hearing for Li Jun is held and Mei is offered a choice.

== Filming ==
One Child is set in Guangzhou but was filmed in Hong Kong and Britain, as under Chinese law before anything is filmed all scripts have to be approved by the Chinese government but this law does not apply in Hong Kong as it is an administrative region.

"In order to film in China the whole project needs to approved and we didn’t attempt that. We didn’t imagine that the scripts would be approved,"

— Interview with Hilary Salmon (executive producer), Radio Times.

"while the drama depicts a clear case of police corruption, the Chinese Government are making strides in tackling similar problems and that they have “nothing to fear” from the drama."

— Interview with Guy Hibbert (writer), Radio Times.
