= Yoshio Sugimoto =

Australian sociologist (born 1939)

Yoshio Sugimoto (杉本良夫, Sugimoto Yoshio; born December 7, 1939) is a sociologist based at La Trobe University, Melbourne, Australia, where he is currently Emeritus Professor.

== Early life ==
He grew up in Kyoto and graduated from Kyoto University in 1964 with a BA in law and politics. He worked for three years as a staff writer for The Mainichi Shimbun, a Japanese national daily newspaper, but changed career direction enrolling in postgraduate studies in the United States where he obtained a PhD in sociology at the University of Pittsburgh in 1973.

== Academic career ==
Sugimoto moved to Melbourne, Australia in 1973, where he began work as a lecturer/researcher at La Trobe University's sociology department. During his more than 30-year tenure at La Trobe, Sugimoto held the positions of Professor of Sociology and Dean of Social Sciences. He became a fellow of the Australian Academy of the Humanities in 1988. In 1981, he was instrumental in the establishment of the Japanese Studies Centre, an inter-university institution based at Monash University, where he served as Foundation Director in 1981-82 and President from 1985.

Sugimoto's work has sought to challenge the prevailing monocultural models of Japanese society which claim it to be uniquely uniform and homogeneous. Together with Ross Mouer, he developed a multicultural model which focuses on cultural diversity and social stratification, contributing to a paradigm shift in this area. Sugimoto's book An Introduction to Japanese Society, first published by Cambridge University Press in 1997 and now in its sixth edition, "conclusively challenged the traditional notion that Japan comprised a uniform culture and showed how Japan, like most countries, had subcultural diversity and class competition." Sugimoto established a publishing house, Trans Pacific Press, in 2000 that specialises in producing English versions of the works of Japanese social scientists.

== Awards and honours ==
- 2022 Order of the Sacred Treasure, Gold Rays with Neck Ribbon
- 2017 Lifetime membership, Japanese Studies Association of Australia
- 2017 The Japanese Foreign Minister's Commendation Award
- 2001 Centenary Medal, Commonwealth of Australia (for service to Australian society and the humanities in the study of sociology and Asian studies)
- 1988 Fellow, Australian Academy of the Humanities (FAHA)
- 1987 Nihon honyaku bunka-shō (Japanese translation award)

== Select bibliography ==
- An Introduction to Japanese Society, fifth edition. Cambridge University Press, 2021.
- Rethinking Japanese Studies: Eurocentrism and the Asia-Pacific Region, co-edited with Kaori Okano. Routledge, 2017.
- The Cambridge Companion to Modern Japanese Culture, editor. Cambridge University Press, 2009.
- Japanese Encounters with Postmodernity, co-edited with Johann Arnason. Columbia University Press, 1995.
- The MFP Debate: A Background Reader, co-edited with Ross Mouer. La Trobe University Press, 1990.
- Constructs for Understanding Japan, co-edited with Ross Mouer. Kegan Paul International, 1989.
- The Japanese Trajectory: Modernization and Beyond, co-edited with Gavan McCormack. Cambridge University Press, 1988.
- Images of Japanese Society: A Study in the Social Construction of Reality, co-authored with Ross Mouer. Kegan Paul International, 1986.
- Democracy in Contemporary Japan, co-edited with Gavan McCormack. M.E. Sharpe, 1986.
- Popular Disturbance in Postwar Japan. Asian Research Service, 1981.
