= Run (British TV series) =

British TV drama

- Region 2 DVD cover
- Genre: Drama
- Starring: Jaime Winstone; Olivia Colman; Lennie James; Katie Leung
- Country of origin: United Kingdom
- Original language: English
- No. of series: 1
- No. of episodes: 4

Production
- Executive producer: Jaimie D’Cruz
- Producer: Chris Carey
- Production location: London
- Running time: 42 minutes
- Production company: Acme Films

Original release
- Network: Channel 4
- Release: 15 July – 18 July 2013

Run is a British four-part drama created by Jonathan Pearson, Marlon Smith, and Daniel Fajemisin-Duncan, and written by Marlon Smith and Daniel Fajemisin-Duncan for Channel 4. The series premiered on 15 July 2013 and ended on 18 July 2013, and was broadcast on Hulu on 20 August 2013. The series comprises four episodes, each focused on one character among the four leads - Carol (Olivia Colman), Ying (Katie Leung), Richard (Lennie James) and Kasia (Katharina Schüttler) - and shows how each character's decisions affect that character and the others.

== Plot ==
The series reveals the interconnectedness of apparently separate lives, through the stories of four people faced with choices in a world where survival is never a given.

== Cast ==
- Tara - Jaime Winstone
- Carol - Olivia Colman
- Richard - Lennie James
- Ying - Katie Leung
- Kasia - Katharina Schüttler
- Jimmy - Nav Sidhu
- Jamal - Gershwyn Eustache Jnr
- Gao - Benedict Wong
- Tomek - Levan Doran
- DC Holt - Marie Critchley
- Zak - Vincenzo Nicoli
- Jon Jon - Brad Damon
- DC Burgess - Chris Jarman
- Lin - Tina Chiang

== Episodes ==
No.	Title	Directed by	Written by	Original release date	UK viewers (millions)
1	"Carol"	Charles Martin	Daniel Fajemisin-Duncan, Marlon Smith	15 July 2013	1.99
Carol is a tough single mother striving to keep her family together. When her teenage sons commit an act of random violence that ends in a stranger's death, Carol faces the impossible choice of protecting her children or doing the right thing.
2	"Ying"	Charles Martin	Daniel Fajemisin-Duncan, Marlon Smith	16 July 2013	1.71
Ying is an illegal immigrant from the Fujian province of China, who sells unlicensed DVDs and stolen mobile phones at barbershops, cafés, and pubs around Brixton.
3	"Richard"	Jonathan Pearson	Daniel Fajemisin-Duncan, Marlon Smith	17 July 2013	1.39
Richard is a recovering heroin addict who spends every day struggling to stay clean. Only one thing spurs him on: the possibility of re-establishing contact with his teenage daughter.
4	"Katrina"	Jonathan Pearson	Daniel Fajemisin-Duncan, Marlon Smith	18 July 2013	1.11
Kasia is a young Polish woman who originally came to London filled with hope. Years later, she is still working as a cleaner, struggling to make ends meet, and contending with a gambling-addicted boyfriend.

== DVD releases ==
Name	Region 1	Region 2	Region 4	Discs
Series One	—N/a	22 July 2013	—N/a	2

== Reception ==
The Express has praised Run, calling it "inventive" and citing Jaime Winstone as a highlight. The Scotsman was slightly more mixed in their review, commenting that: "This gritty, grim drama will win awards but, perhaps, be too hard-going for many."
