= Charlotte Y. Salisbury =

American travel writer

- Born: March 12, 1914; Weston
- Died: April 25, 2012 (aged 98); Salisbury
- Occupation: Writer
- Spouse(s): Harrison Salisbury
- Parent(s): Benjamin Loring Young

Charlotte Young Salisbury (March 12, 1914 – April 25, 2012) was an American travel writer who wrote seven books about her experiences in Asia.

Charlotte Young was born on March 12, 1914 in Weston, Massachusetts, the daughter of politician Benjamin Loring Young. She was educated at the Winsor School in Boston and the Dobbs School in Dobbs Ferry, New York. In the early 1930s, she was a model with the John Robert Powers agency.

She met New York Times Moscow correspondent Harrison Salisbury when he delivered a lecture in Salisbury, Connecticut. They married in 1964. In his book A Journey for Our Times (1983), Harrison Salisbury recalled their first meeting:

No one I had met before had spoken with such cool and perfect honesty, the words tart and fresh, in a light but unmistakable Boston accent, the opinions warm, no qualifications...I had never before found a woman who would stand up to the devil (or Henry Kissinger) and tell the truth to his face.

Charlotte Salisbury began accompanying her husband on his trips to Asia for the Times. Her first book, Asian Diary (1967), records their lengthy 1966 journey in a number of countries and areas around China: Hong Kong, Cambodia, Thailand, Burma, India, Sikkim, Mongolia, Siberia, and Japan. She records meetings with both royalty and government leaders and everyday people. Her second book, China Diary (1972), records a six-week visit to Beijing and was one of the first Western accounts of everyday life in China following the 1972 visit by US President Richard Nixon. Her final book, Long March Diary: China Epic (1986), recounts the grueling 7,000-mile journey taken by her and her husband via donkey, jeep, and truck retracing the route of The Long March.

Charlotte Y. Salisbury died on April 25, 2012, in a nursing home in Salisbury.

== Personal life ==
From 1934 to 1939, she was married to Allston Boyer; they had one daughter. From 1940 to 1959, she was married to John A. Rand; they had three children. Harrison Salisbury died in 1993.

== Bibliography ==
- Asian Diary (1967)
- China Diary (1972)
- Sikkim: Mountaintop Kingdom (1972) with photographer Alice Kendall
- Russian Diary (1974)
- China Diary: After Mao (1977)
- Tibetan Diary (1980)
- Long March Diary: China Epic (1986)
