= My Body Back =

Project supporting survivors of sexual assault in the United Kingdom

The My Body Back Project was set up in London by Pavan Amara in August 2014. First intended as a website and support network for survivors of sexual assault, it has expanded its scope into first a sexual health clinic and then other projects such as a maternity clinic, a photography project and various workshops.

== Foundation ==
Having survived a sexual assault in her teens, Pavan Amara realised in her twenties she was having trouble accessing healthcare and when she spoke to other women she realised many people had issues resulting from trauma. She therefore decided to set up the My Body Back Project in August 2014. She intended it to provide a website which could be useful for survivors of sexual assault and also a support network. She also wanted it to help medical professionals help survivors better. My Body Back became a group which would provide healthcare and also sex and relationship support groups aimed specifically at women and trans people who have survived sexual assault. It is a non-profit organisation. Amara wanted to provide physical and practical resources.

== Clinic ==
After one year, the project set up a clinic intended for survivors of sexual assault. It was the first of its kind in the world. The clinic was funded by the National Health Service (NHS) and located at St Bartholomew's Hospital in London. The clinic provided testing for sexually transmitted infections, cervical screening and birth control advice.

The clinic opened a branch in Glasgow in 2018. The project was funded by the Scottish Government. It was to be run by NHS doctors, nurses, counsellors, administrators and volunteers from Rape Crisis Scotland who had been trained by members of the London clinic.

== Maternity clinic ==
Having heard from women that they would like to have a maternity clinic set up exclusively for survivors of sexual assault, My Body Back set up the UK's first such clinic in 2016 together with Barts Health NHS Trust. It was established at the Royal London Hospital. Amara commented that "a number of the women told me how isolated they felt throughout pregnancy and labour and how it had triggered them into remembering their experience of being raped."

Women at the clinic could attend antenatal classes, have gynaecological examinations, and receive psychological support from trained staff, such as midwives, pediatricians and psychologists. The users also had access to self-test kits to avoid being touched. This was helpful since sometimes women being examined were being unintentionally put into positions or situations which brought back the trauma of assault. Amara runs the clinic alongside gynaecologist and obstetrician Dr Rehan Khan and consultant midwife Inderjeet Kaur. On the topic of why nobody had set up such a clinic before, Amara commented "I really don't think it's the fault of health workers, because everybody's been wonderful helping me do this."

== Other projects ==
My Body Back began a photography project with photographer Rankin in 2016, focused upon aiding women recover from sexual assault. Rankin took extreme close-up shots of temporary tattoos on the women's skin which gave messages of strength and solidarity such as 'Nobody is entitled to my body but me'. Rankin commented "I was truly moved by this project and humbled to be involved. The sheer strength of these women, after what they have been through, left me speechless."

'Notes of Love' was a project in which people write anonymous messages to survivors of sexual assault, which are then distributed by Rape Crisis England and Wales. Amara invited students from 20 universities to participate in the project. Another project was Café V, a regular Saturday morning meeting in a sex shop in Shoreditch, East London, where women could discuss how to enjoy sexual intercourse again after experiencing rape. The café was trans-inclusive.

The Clit List is a pornography resource for survivors of sexual assault. It aims to provide detailed reviews of pornographic films, so that people can decide if they want to watch them or not without triggering.
