= Jung Chang =

Chinese-British author (born 1952)

Jung Chang CBE
- 張戎
- Chang in 2025
- Born: 25 March 1952 (age 74); Yibin, Sichuan, China
- Education: University of York
- Occupation: Writer
- Spouse: Jon Halliday
- Writing career
- Period: 1986–present
- Genre: Biography
- Subject: China
- Jung Chang's voice from the BBC programme Woman's Hour, 18 December 2013.
- Website: www.jungchang.net

Jung Chang CBE (traditional Chinese: 張戎; simplified Chinese: 张戎; pinyin: Zhāng Róng; Wade–Giles: Chang Jung, Mandarin pronunciation: [tʂɑ́ŋ ɻʊ̌ŋ]; born 25 March 1952) is a Chinese-born British author. She is best known for her family autobiography Wild Swans, which has sold over 10 million copies worldwide but is banned in the People's Republic of China. Her 832-page biography of Mao Zedong, Mao: The Unknown Story, written with her husband, the Irish historian Jon Halliday, and touching on parts of her personal memoir, was published in June 2005. Reception of the work by academics is mixed, though the work has received acclaim in the popular press.

== Biography ==
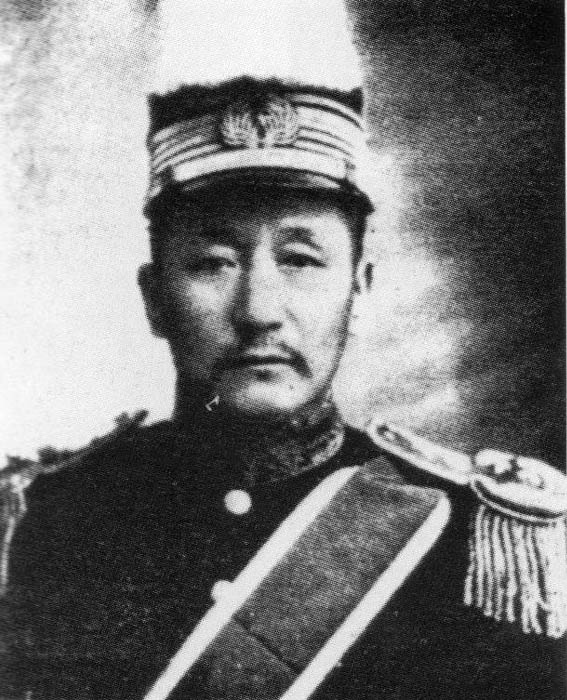
Xue Zhiheng, Jung Chang's grandfather

Chang was born on 25 March 1952 in Yibin, Sichuan, as the second daughter and child of five children. Her parents were both Chinese Communist Party officials, and her father was greatly interested in literature. As Party cadres, life was relatively good for her family at first; her father became successful as a propagandist at a regional level. His formal ranking was as a "level 10 official", meaning that he was one of 20,000 or so most important cadres, or ganbu, in the country. The Communist Party provided her family with a dwelling in a guarded, walled compound, a maid and chauffeur, as well as a wet-nurse and nanny for Chang and her four siblings.

Chang writes that she was originally named Er-hong (Chinese: 二鴻; lit. 'Second Swan'), which sounds like the Chinese word for "faded red". As communists were "deep red", she asked her father to rename her when she was 12 years old, specifying she wanted "a name with a military ring to it." He suggested "Jung", which means "martial affairs.".

=== Cultural Revolution ===
Like many of her peers, Chang chose to become a Red Guard at the age of 14, during the early years of the Cultural Revolution. In Wild Swans she said she was "keen to do so", "thrilled by my red armband". In her memoirs Chang states that she refused to participate in the attacks on her teachers and other Chinese, and she left after a short period, for she found the Red Guards too violent.

The failures of the Great Leap Forward had led her parents to oppose Mao Zedong's policies. They were targeted during the Cultural Revolution, as most high-ranking officials were. When Chang's father criticized Mao by name, Chang writes in Wild Swans that this exposed them to retaliation from Mao's supporters. Her parents were publicly humiliated – ink was poured over their heads, they were forced to wear placards denouncing them around their necks, kneel in gravel and to stand outside in the rain – followed by imprisonment, her father's treatment leading to lasting physical and mental illness. Their careers were destroyed, and her family was forced to leave their home.

Before her parents' denunciation and imprisonment, Chang had unquestioningly supported Mao and criticized herself for any momentary doubts. But by the time of his death, her respect for Mao, she writes, had been destroyed. Chang wrote that when she heard he had died, she had to bury her head in the shoulder of another student to pretend she was grieving. She explained her change on the stance of Mao with the following comments:

"The Chinese seemed to be mourning Mao in a heartfelt fashion. But I wondered how many of their tears were genuine. People had practiced acting to such a degree that they confused it with their true feelings. Weeping for Mao was perhaps just another programmed act in their programmed lives.

Chang's depiction of the Chinese people as having been "programmed" by Maoism would ring forth in her subsequent writings.

According to Wild Swans (chapters 23 to 28), Chang's life during the Cultural Revolution and the years immediately after the Cultural Revolution was one of both a victim and one of the privileged. Chang attended Sichuan University in 1973 and became one of the so-called "Students of Workers, Peasants and Soldiers". Her father's government-sponsored official funeral was held in 1975. Chang was able to leave China and study in the UK on a Chinese government scholarship in 1978, a year before the post-Mao Reforms began.

=== Studying English ===
The closing down of the university system led Chang, like most of her generation, away from the political maelstroms of the academy. Instead, she spent several years as a peasant, a barefoot doctor (a part-time peasant doctor), a steelworker and an electrician, though she received no formal training because of Mao's policy, which did not require formal instruction as a prerequisite for such work.

The universities were eventually re-opened and she gained a place at Sichuan University to study English, later becoming an assistant lecturer there. After Mao's death, she passed an exam which allowed her to study in the West, and her application to leave China was approved once her father was politically rehabilitated.

== Life in Britain ==
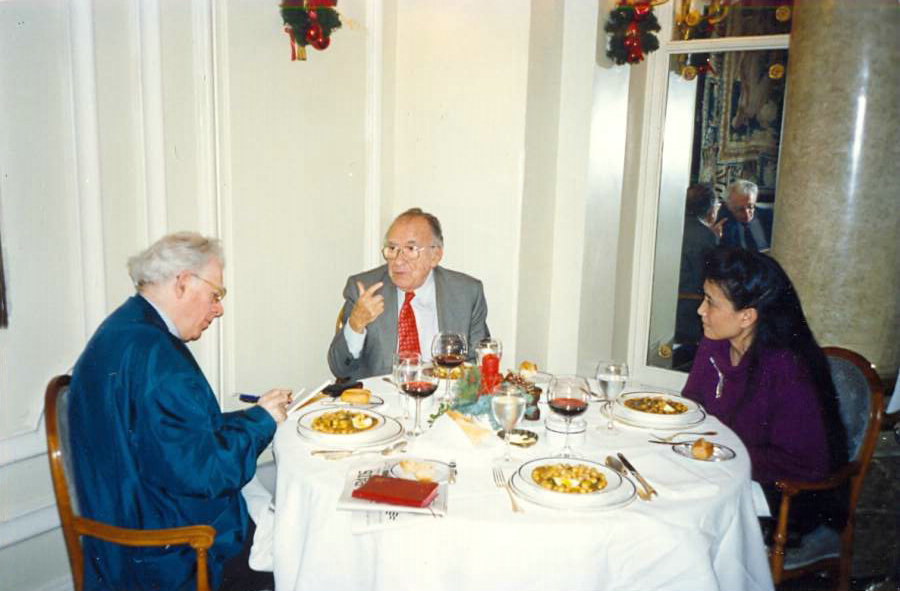
Chang (right) and Halliday (left) with Spanish politician Santiago Carrillo in 2009

=== Academic background ===
Chang left China in 1978 to study in Britain on a government scholarship, staying first in London where she attended Ealing College (now University of West London). She later moved to Yorkshire, studying linguistics at the University of York with a scholarship from the university itself, living in Derwent College. She received her PhD in linguistics from York in 1982, becoming the first person from the People's Republic of China to be awarded a PhD from a British university. In 1986, she and Jon Halliday published Mme Sun Yat-sen (Soong Ching-ling), a biography of Sun Yat-Sen's widow.

She has also been awarded honorary doctorates from University of Buckingham, University of York, University of Warwick, University of Dundee, the Open University, University of West London, and Bowdoin College (USA). She lectured for some time at the School of Oriental and African Studies in London, before leaving in the 1990s to concentrate on her writing.

=== New experiences ===
In 2003, Jung Chang wrote a new foreword to Wild Swans, describing her early life in Britain and explaining why she wrote the book. Having lived in China during the 1960s and 1970s, she found Britain exciting and loved the country, especially its diverse range of culture, literature and arts. She found even colourful window-boxes worth writing home about – Hyde Park and Kew Gardens were inspiring. She took every opportunity to watch Shakespeare's plays in both London and York. In an interview with HarperCollins, Chang stated: "I feel perhaps my heart is still in China".

Chang lives in west London with her husband, the Irish historian Jon Halliday, who specializes in the history of Asia. She was able to visit mainland China to see her family, with permission from the Chinese authorities, despite the fact that all her books are banned.

=== Celebrity ===
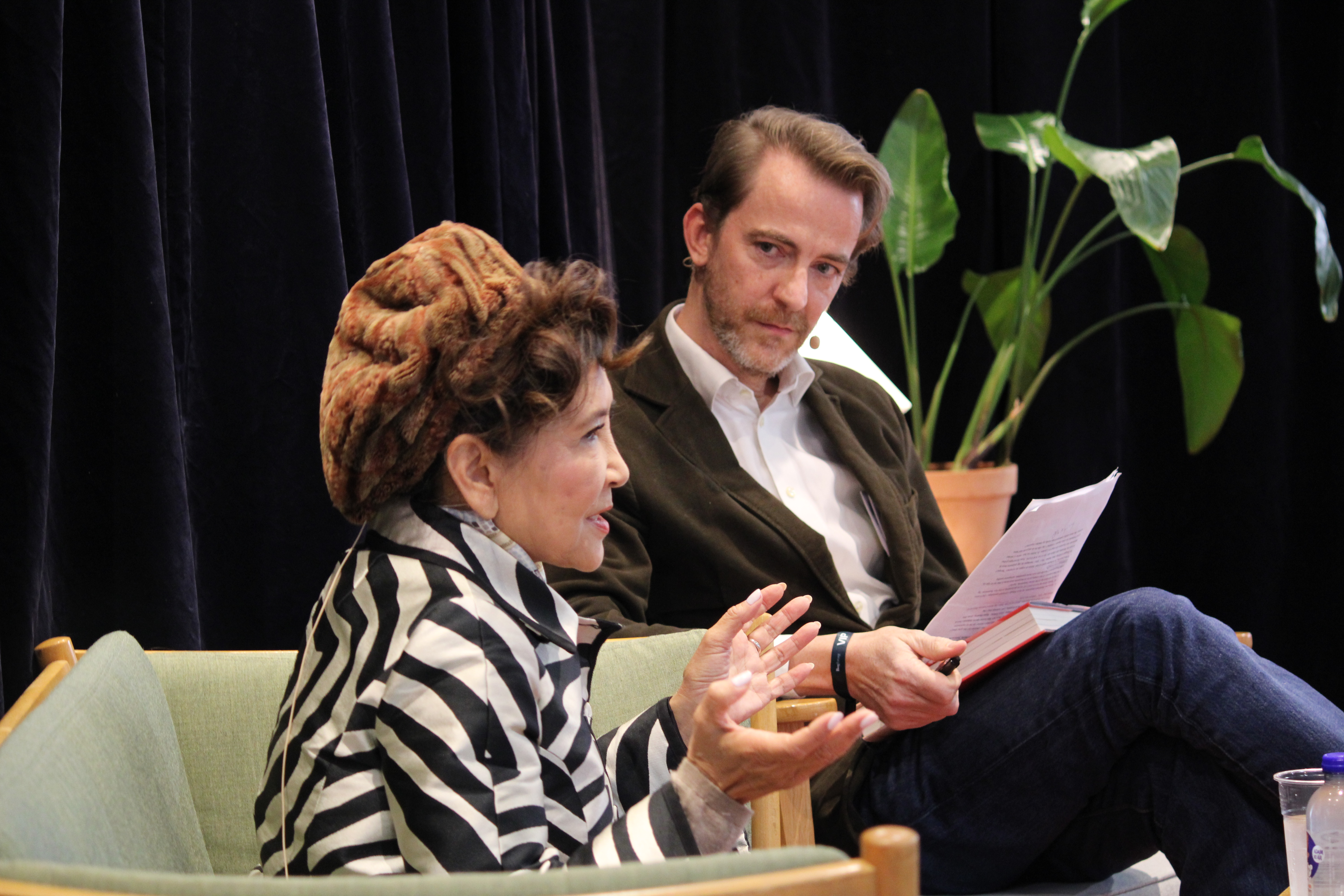
Chang being interviewed at the 2025 edition of the Danish bookfair Bogforum in Copenhagen

The publication of Jung Chang's second book Wild Swans made her a celebrity. Chang's unique style, using a personal description of the life of three generations of Chinese women to highlight the many changes that the country went through, proved to be highly successful. Large numbers of sales were generated, and the book's popularity led to its being sold around the world and translated into 37 languages.

Chang became a popular figure for talks about Communist China; and she has travelled across Britain, Europe, America, and many other places in the world. She returned to the University of York on 14 June 2005, to address the university's debating union and spoke to an audience of over 300, most of whom were students. The BBC invited her onto the panel of Question Time for a first-ever broadcast from Shanghai on 10 March 2005, but she was unable to attend when she broke her leg a few days beforehand.

Chang was appointed Commander of the Order of the British Empire (CBE) in the 2024 New Year Honours for services to literature and history.

== Publications ==
=== Wild Swans ===
The international best-seller is a biography of three generations of Chinese women in 20th century China – her grandmother, mother, and herself. Chang paints a vivid portrait of the political and military turmoil of China in this period, from the marriage of her grandmother to a warlord, to her mother's experience of Japanese-occupied Jinzhou during the Second Sino-Japanese War, and her own experience of the effects of Mao's policies of the 1950s and 1960s.

Wild Swans was translated into 37 languages and sold 13 million copies, receiving praise from authors such as J. G. Ballard. It is banned in mainland China, though many pirated versions circulated, as do translations in Hong Kong and Taiwan.

=== Mao: The Unknown Story ===
Chang's 2005 work, a biography of Mao, was co-authored with her husband Jon Halliday and portrays Mao in an extremely negative light. The couple traveled all over the world to research the book, which took 12 years to write. They interviewed hundreds of people who had known Mao, including George H. W. Bush, Henry Kissinger, and Tenzin Gyatso, the Dalai Lama. Kissinger called it "grotesque in that it depicts Mao as a man without any qualities." Later, he described it in his book On China as "one-sided but often thought-provoking."

Among their criticisms of Mao, Chang and Halliday argue that despite his having been born into a relatively rich peasant family, he had little well-informed concern for the long-term welfare of the Chinese peasantry. They hold Mao responsible for the famine resulting from the Great Leap Forward and state that he had created the famine by exporting food when China had insufficient grain to feed its own people. They also write that Mao had arranged for the arrests and murders of many of his political opponents, including some of his personal friends, and they argue that he was a far more tyrannical leader than had previously been thought.

Mao: The Unknown Story became a best-seller, with UK sales alone reaching 60,000 in six months. Academics and commentators wrote reviews ranging from praise to criticism. Professor Richard Baum said that it had to be "taken very seriously as the most thoroughly researched and richly documented piece of synthetic scholarship" on Mao. The Sydney Morning Herald reported that while few commentators disputed it, "some of the world's most eminent scholars of modern Chinese history" had referred to the book as "a gross distortion of the records."

Historian Rebecca Karl summarized its negative reception, writing, "According to many reviewers of [Mao: The Unknown Story], the story told therein is unknown because Chang and Halliday substantially fabricated it or exaggerated it into existence."

=== Empress Dowager Cixi ===
In October 2013, Chang published a biography of Empress Dowager Cixi, who led China from 1861 until her death in 1908. Chang argues that Cixi has been "deemed either tyrannical and vicious, or hopelessly incompetent—or both," and that this view is both simplistic and inaccurate. Chang portrays her as intelligent, open-minded, and a proto feminist limited by a xenophobic and deeply conservative imperial bureaucracy. Although Cixi is often accused of reactionary conservatism (especially for her treatment of the Guangxu Emperor during and after the Hundred Days' Reform), Chang argues that Cixi actually started the Reforms and "brought medieval China into the modern age." Newspaper reviews have also been positive in their assessment. Te-Ping Chen, writing in The Wall Street Journal, found the book "packed with details that bring to life its central character." Simon Sebag Montefiore writes: "Filled with new revelations, it's a gripping and surprising story of an extraordinary woman in power. Using Chinese sources, totally untapped by western books, this reappraises one of the great monstresses of modern history… Jung Chang’s revisionism means that this book reveals a new and different woman: ambitious, sometimes murderous, but pragmatic and unique. All of this adds up to make Empress Dowager Cixi a powerful read." The New York Times named it one of its "Notable Books of the Year".

The book received critical treatment in the academic world. The Qing dynasty specialist Pamela Kyle Crossley wrote a skeptical review in the London Review of Books. "Chang has made impressive use of the rapidly expanding range of published material from the imperial archives. But understanding these sources requires profound study of the context. [...] Her claims regarding Cixi’s importance seem to be minted from her own musings and have little to do with what we know was actually going in China. I am as eager as anyone to see more attention paid to women of historical significance. But rewriting Cixi as Catherine the Great or Margaret Thatcher is a poor bargain: the gain of an illusory icon at the expense of historical sense."

=== List of works ===
- Jung Chang and Jon Halliday, Madame Sun Yat-sen: Soong Ching-ling (London, 1986); Penguin, ISBN 0-14-008455-X
- Jung Chang, Wild Swans: Three Daughters of China (London, 1992); 2004 Harper Perennial ed. ISBN 0-00-717615-5
- Jung Chang, Lynn Pan and Henry Zhao (edited by Jessie Lim and Li Yan), Another province: new Chinese writing from London (London, 1994); Lambeth Chinese Community Association, ISBN 0-9522973-0-2.
- Jung Chang and Jon Halliday, Mao: The Unknown Story (London, 2005); Jonathan Cape, ISBN 0-679-42271-4
- Jung Chang, Empress Dowager Cixi: The Concubine Who Launched Modern China (Alfred A. Knopf, 2013), ISBN 0224087436
- Jung Chang, Big Sister, Little Sister, Red Sister (Jonathan Cape, 2019) ISBN 978-1910702789
- Jung Chang, Fly, Wild Swans: My Mother, Myself and China (William Collins, 2025) ISBN 9780008661069
