= Jon Halliday =

Irish historian (born 1939)

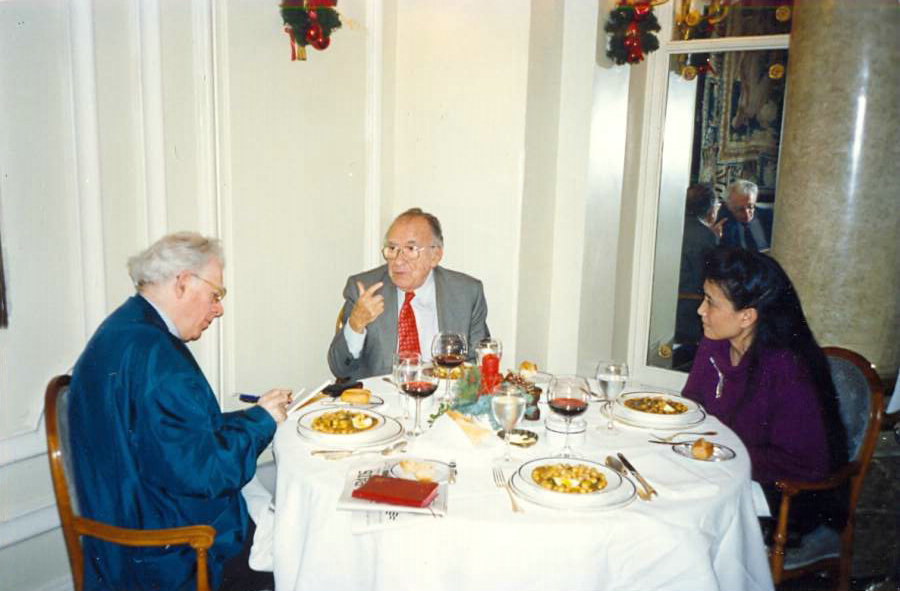
Halliday (left) and Chang (right) with Spanish politician Santiago Carrillo in 2009

Jon Halliday (born 28 June 1939) is an Irish historian specialising in modern Asia. He was formerly a senior visiting research fellow at King's College London. He was educated at the University of Oxford and has been married to Jung Chang since 1991. Halliday is the older brother of the late Irish International relations academic and writer Fred Halliday.

Halliday has written or edited eight books, including a long interview with the U.S. filmmaker Douglas Sirk. In addition, he and his wife, Jung Chang, with whom he lives in Notting Hill, West London, researched and wrote a biography of Mao Zedong, Mao: The Unknown Story. The book was criticized by many academics, though it received acclaim in the popular press. The Sydney Morning Herald reported that while few commentators disputed it, "some of the world's most eminent scholars of modern Chinese history" had referred to the book as "a gross distortion of the records." Some scholars offered measured praise of the range of scholarship, but more prevalent criticism on factual accuracy, methodology, and use of sources. Historian Rebecca Karl summarized its negative reception, writing, "According to many reviewers of Mao: the Unknown Story, the story told therein is unknown because Chang and Halliday substantially fabricated it or exaggerated it into existence."

== Bibliography ==
- Sirk on Sirk: Interviews with Jon Halliday (Secker & Warburg 1971), ISBN 0-436-09924-1
- "Japan and America: antagonistic alliance". New Left Review. I (77). New Left Review: 59–76. January–February 1973. (with Gavan McCormack)
- Japanese Imperialism Today: "Co-prosperity in Greater East Asia" (Penguin 1973), ISBN 0-14-021669-3 (with Gavan McCormack)
- The Psychology of Gambling (Allen Lane 1974), ISBN 0-7139-0642-1 (ed. with Peter Fuller)
- A Political History of Japanese Capitalism (Monthly Review Press 1975), ISBN 0-85345-471-X
- The Artful Albanian: The Memoirs of Enver Hoxha (Chatto & Windus 1986), ISBN 0-7011-2970-0 (ed.)
- Mme Sun Yat-sen (Soong Ching-ling) (Penguin 1986), ISBN 0-14-008455-X (with Jung Chang)
- Korea: The Unknown War (Viking 1988), ISBN 0-670-81903-4 (with Bruce Cumings)
- Mao: The Unknown Story (Jonathan Cape 2005), ISBN 0-224-07126-2 (with Jung Chang)
