= Harrison Salisbury =

American journalist (1908 – 1993)

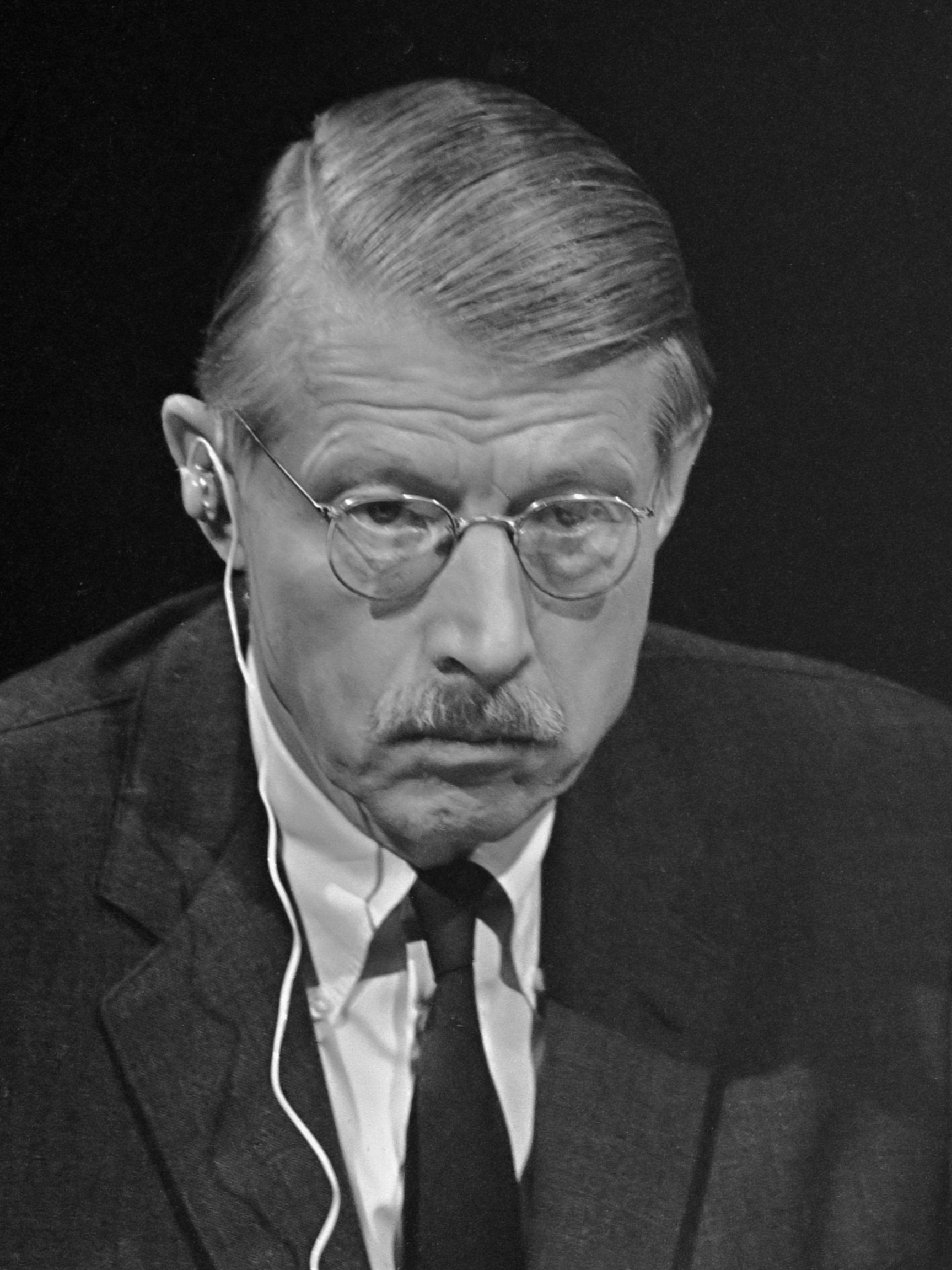
- Born: November 14, 1908; Minneapolis
- Died: July 5, 1993 (aged 84); Providence
- Alma mater: University of Minnesota
- Occupation: Journalist
- Spouse(s): Charlotte Y. Salisbury
- Awards: George Polk Awards (1966); Pulitzer Prize for International Reporting (1955); George Polk Awards (1957); The Hillman Prize for Newspaper Journalism (1967)

Harrison Evans Salisbury (November 14, 1908 – July 5, 1993) was an American journalist and the first regular New York Times correspondent in Moscow after World War II.

== Biography ==
Salisbury was born in Minneapolis, Minnesota. He graduated from Minneapolis North High School in 1925 and the University of Minnesota in 1930.

He spent nearly 20 years with United Press (UP), much of it overseas, and was UP's foreign editor during the last two years of World War II. Additionally, he was The New York Times' Moscow bureau chief from 1949 to 1954. Salisbury constantly battled Soviet censorship and won the Pulitzer Prize for International Reporting in 1955. He twice (in 1957 and 1966) received the George Polk Award for Foreign Reporting.

In the 1960s, he covered the growing civil rights movement in the Southern United States. From there, he directed the Times' coverage of President John F. Kennedy's assassination in 1963. In 1964 he wrote an introduction to The New York Times-published edition of the Warren Report. In 1970, he served as the first editor of The Times' Op-Ed page, which was created by John B. Oakes, and was assistant managing editor from 1964 to 1972, associate editor from 1972 to 1973. He retired from The Times in 1973.

Salisbury obtained permission in 1966, both from the government of North Vietnam and from the US State Department, to visit North Vietnam. He arrived in Hanoi in late December, and his reports began appearing in the New York Times on December 25. This was the first time a mainstream American journalist had ever reported on a war from the capital of the hostile government. The fact that the United States had not actually declared war may have been crucial in making this possible. Salisbury reported that American bombing of North Vietnam had been less effective in weakening North Vietnam's transportation system than the US government had been claiming, while hitting North Vietnamese civilians more than US spokesmen had been admitting. This aroused a storm of controversy. His reports were the first published by a major American media outlet that genuinely questioned the American air war.

He was interviewed in the anti-Vietnam War documentary film In the Year of the Pig.

Salisbury also toured America for Esquire, for which the Xerox company paid him $55,000.

Salisbury reported extensively from Communist China, where, in 1989, he witnessed the bloody government crackdown on the student demonstration in Tiananmen Square.

External videos
- Booknotes interview with Salisbury on Tiananmen Diary, October 15, 1989, C-SPAN

He wrote 29 books, including American in Russia (1955) and Behind the Lines—Hanoi (1967). His other books include The Shook-Up Generation (1958), To Moscow - and Beyond: A Reporter's Narrative (1960), Orbit of China (1967), War Between Russia and China (1969), The 900 Days: The Siege of Leningrad (1969), To Peking and Beyond: A Report on the New Asia (1973), The Gates of Hell (1975), Black Night, White Snow: Russia's Revolutions 1905-1917 (1978), The Unknown War (1978) [about WW2], Without Fear or Favor: The New York Times and Its Times (1980), Journey For Our Times (autobiographical, 1983), China: 100 Years of Revolution, (1983), The Long March: The Untold Story (1985), Tiananmen Diary: Thirteen Days in June (1989), The New Emperors: China in the Era of Mao and Deng (1992) and his last, Heroes of My Time (1993). The 900 Days was in the process of being adapted into a feature film by Italian director Sergio Leone at the time of Leone's death in 1989.

In 1964, he married Charlotte Y. Salisbury, who accompanied him on numerous trips to Asia. She wrote seven books about their experiences.

Salisbury was an Eagle Scout and a recipient of the Distinguished Eagle Scout Award from the Boy Scouts of America. He was a member of both the American Academy of Arts and Sciences and the American Philosophical Society. In 1990, he received the Ischia International Journalism Award.

He died in Providence, Rhode Island at age 84.
