= Te-Ping Chen =

American journalist and author

Te-Ping Chen is an American journalist and author, currently residing in Philadelphia.

Chen is currently a reporter for the Wall Street Journal, covering workers and workplace culture. From 2014 to 2018, she was a Beijing-based China correspondent for the Journal. She first joined the Journal in 2012.

Her great-grandfather was a poet and journalist from Guangxi.

Her debut story collection Land of Big Numbers was included in Barack Obama's 2021 summer reading list.

== Books ==
- Land of Big Numbers (2021)
