= Sun Shuyun =

Chinese writer

Sun Shuyun (born in 1963) is a Chinese writer. Sun was born in China and graduated from Beijing University and won a scholarship to the University of Oxford. Her books include Ten Thousand Miles Without a Cloud (in which she retraces the journey of the 7th-century Chinese monk Xuanzang), The Long March: The True History of Communist China's Founding Myth, A Year in Tibet, a book made in conjunction with the BBC documentary A Year in Tibet.
