= Gung Ho =

Gung ho is an English-language term taken from Chinese.

Gung Ho may also refer to:

== Film and television ==
- Gung Ho (film), a 1986 American comedy starring Michael Keaton
- Gung Ho (TV series), a 1986–1987 American sitcom based on the 1986 film
- Gung Ho!, a 1943 American war film starring Randolph Scott

== Music ==
- Gung Ho (album), a 2000 album by Patti Smith, or the title song
- "Gung-Ho", a song by Anthrax from the 1985 album Spreading the Disease
- Gung Ho, a 1980s Irish band formed by former members of the Boomtown Rats

== Other uses ==
- Gung-Ho (G.I. Joe), a fictional character in the G.I. Joe universe
- Gung Ho – ICCIC, an organization in China to support the Gung Ho movement
- GungHo Online Entertainment, a Japanese video game corporation
