= Bernard Rackham =

Pottery and maijolica scholar and medievalist

Bernard Rackham CB FSA (26 July 1876, Lambeth, London – 13 February 1964, Liss, Hampshire) was an English writer and lecturer on ceramics and stained glass and spent his career as a curator at the Victoria and Albert Museum. He is known for his pioneering research on Italian maiolica.

== Education and career ==
Bernard Rackham matriculated in October 1895 at Pembroke College, Cambridge, graduating there B.A. 1898 and M.A. 1907. At the Ceramics Department of the Victoria and Albert Museum he was from 1898 to 1924 an Assistant and from 1924 to 1938 a Keeper. As a curator, he acquired Chinese ceramics, works by Reginald Wells, and works by William Staite Murray, the latter works as the gift of George Eumorfopoulos. Rackham contributed over 50 articles to The Burlington Magazine and wrote one section of the article on ceramics for the 1911 Encyclopædia Britannica.

In 1937, he was appointed a Companion of the Order of the Bath (CB). The Cardiff Metropolitan University Library has the Rackham Collection of over 70 books written or edited by Bernard Rackham, together with books from his personal collection and associated objects donated by the Rackham family.

== Family ==
Bernard Rackham married in 1909. One of 12 children, Bernard Rackham was a brother of the famous illustrator Arthur Rackham and a brother of Harris Rackham, who was a lecturer in classics at Cambridge and the husband of the social reformer Clara Rackham. Another brother, Maurice Rackham (1879–1927), was killed by an avalanche at Zürs.

== Selected publications ==
- A book of porcelain, fine examples in the Victoria & Albert museum. London: A. & C. Black. 1910; illustrated by William Gibb (1839–1929), elder brother of Robert Gibb
- Catalogue of the Herbert Allen collection of English porcelain. Victoria and Albert museum ... Publication no. 123C. London: H.M. Stationery Office and also by Victoria and Albert Museum, Dept. of Ceramics. 1917.
- Catalogue of the Le Blond collection of Corean pottery. Publication no. 126C. London: H.M.S.O. and by Victoria and Albert Museum, Dept. of Ceramics. 1918.
- Dutch tiles, the Van den Bergh gift; a guide to the collection given to the museum by Henry Van den Bergh, esquire, through the National art-collections fund. Victoria and Albert Museum ... Publication no. 163c. London: Pub. under the authority of the Board of Education, and by Victoria and Albert Museum. Dept. of Ceramics. 1923.
- with Herbert Read: English pottery: its development from early times to the end of the eighteenth century. London: Ernest Benn Ltd. 1924. pp. xxiv+142.
- with Robert Lockhart Hobson and William King: Chinese ceramics in private collections. London: Halton and Truscott Smith. 1931.
- Catalogue of Italian maiolica. Victoria and Albert museum. Department of ceramics. London: Pub. under the authority of the Board of education, also by Victoria and Albert Museum. Dept. of Ceramics. 1940.
- A key to pottery and glass. London: Blackie & Son. 1940. pp. xii+180.
- The ancient glass of Canterbury Cathedral. London: Lund Humphries, for the Friends of Canterbury Cathedral. 1949. pp. xv+194.
