= Pauline Simmons =

American art curator (1893–1985)

- Born: May 19, 1893; Clarks Mills, Pennsylvania, U.S.
- Died: October 1985 (aged 92)
- Occupation: Curator
- Awards: Guggenheim Fellowship (1957)

Academic background
- Education: Pennsylvania State College

Academic work
- Sub-discipline: East Asian textiles
- Institutions: Metropolitan Museum of Art

Pauline Simmons (May 19, 1893 – October 1985) was an American curator. After acquiring a collection of Chinese textiles while an expatriate in China, she was hired at the Metropolitan Museum of Art and became a curator of East Asian textiles there. She co-authored Chinese Textiles (1934) with Alan Priest and was a 1957 Guggenheim Fellow.

== Biography ==
Simmons was born on May 19, 1893, in Clarks Mills, Pennsylvania. After attending the Pennsylvania State College from 1910 to 1912, she worked as a public school teacher in Pennsylvania from 1913 to 1917. She later worked at the United States Department of War from 1918 to 1919.

With several relatives living in Nanjing, Simmons moved there in 1920. She worked as an English teacher at the American High School in Nanjing (1920–1921) and later moved to Beijing to work as an English literature lecturer at China University (1922–1924). During her time in China, she acquired a collection of Chinese textiles and learned to be fluent in Chinese.

In 1925, Simmons returned to the United States with her textile collection, before starting work at Columbia University. In 1928, she was hired at the Metropolitan Museum of Art as Alan Priest's secretary. She was later promoted to assistant in 1929 before becoming an assistant curator in 1931. In 1953, she was promoted to associate curator. In 1958, she retired from the Met "with only a meager pension".

Simmons co-authored Chinese Textiles (1931) with Priest, focusing on Chinese textile art from periods like the Han dynasty. She also wrote Chinese Patterned Silks (1948). In 1957, she was awarded a Guggenheim Fellowship "for studies of 7th and 8th century Chinese and Japanese textiles". Julia Meech remarked that both Simmons and Priest "were instrumental in building [the Met's] fine collection of Chinese and Japanese costumes and textiles". Louis V. Ledoux, an art historian interested in textiles, once hired Simmons to assist him with inventory lists for his collection, specifically for help on specialized terms. She also lectured on East Asian textiles, having once lectured about Chinese court robes at the Royal Ontario Museum in November 1946.

Simmons died in October 1985.

== Works ==
- (with Alan Priest) Chinese Textiles (1934)
