= Rose Kerr =

Rose Kerr may refer to:

- Rose Kerr (Girl Guiding) (1882–1944), British pioneer Guider
- Rose Kerr (art historian) (born 1953), English curator and art historian, specializing in Chinese art
