= Mary Tregear =

British art historian and curator (1924–2010)

Mary Tregear, FBA (11 February 1924 – 17 December 2010) was a British art historian and curator specialising in Chinese art.

== Biography ==
Tregear was born 11 February 1924 in Wuchang, Republic of China (present-day Wuhan, China) where her parents worked as a doctor and a university teacher. One of three siblings, Tregear's family returned to England following civil unrest.

After studying at Bristol University and SOAS, University of London, she taught in the Central China Normal University for three years. She was then a curator at Hong Kong University's Fung Ping Shan Museum, also lecturing. In 1961 she joined the Ashmolean Museum, Oxford, where she was assistant keeper for the Chinese collection, and then keeper of Eastern Art, from 1987 to 1991.

She was a fellow of St Cross College, Oxford, a fellow of the British Academy, and president of the Oriental Ceramic Society from 1978 to 1980. On 17 December 2010, Tregear died in Cambridge aged 86.

== Main publications ==
- Catalogue of Chinese Greenware, Ashmolean Museum, Oxford, 1976.
- Chinese Ceramics in the Ashmolean Museum. An illustrated handbook to the collections, Ashmolean Museum, Oxford, 1979.
- Chinese Art, Thames and Hudson (World of Art series), London, 1980 and 2nd edn 1997 (still in print in 2017).
- Song Ceramics, Thames and Hudson, London, 1982.
- Kiln Sites of Ancient China (by Penelope Hughes-Stanton and Rose Kerr, ed. by Mary Tregear), Oriental Ceramic Society, 1980
- Oriental Lacquer: Chinese and Japanese lacquer from the Ashmolean Museum(O.R. Impey and Mary Tregear), Ashmolean Museum, Oxford, 1983.
