= History of the cooperative movement in China =

Cooperative
- Chinese: 合作社
Transcriptions
Standard Mandarin
- Hanyu Pinyin: hézuòshè
- Gwoyeu Romatzyh: hertzuohsheh
- Wade–Giles: ho^{2}-tso^{4}-shê^{4}

The history of the Cooperative Movement in China began a quarter of the way into the 20th century, when Chinese modernizers and sympathetic foreigners promoted cooperatives as a tool for reforming the Chinese economy.

This accelerated during the Kuomintang's peak control of the country in the 1930s, when cooperatives were a significant plank of the Kuomintang's development policy. After the Communist Revolution, cooperatives became the first form by which the Chinese economy was brought under socialist principles in the 1950s. Even after reform and opening up, cooperatives remain a significant part of the modern Chinese economy.

== Historical context ==
=== Cooperative movement ===
The modern cooperative movement arose in the early 19th century as a response to the negative social consequences of the Industrial Revolution and thus was a response to the same conditions that begot the wider labor movement. Two men are typically credited with developing the modern concept of the cooperative enterprise: Robert Owen in Britain and Charles Fourier on the European continent. They advocated that, instead of having businesses be owned by private individuals who pay workers wages and then keep all remaining profits, businesses be set up that gave ownership to the workers themselves as a class. These proposals soon developed into a social movement that was present in many countries; in 1895, the First International Co-operative Congress was held, which lead to the foundation of the International Co-operative Alliance.

==== Marxism and cooperatives ====
Owen and Fourier both called themselves socialists at some point, and are typically regarded as belonging to the utopian socialist movement. Thus, they were criticized by Karl Marx for, above all, failing to recognize the fundamental role of class conflict in history, while cooperatives as a social form had a mixed reputation in early Marxist circles. On one hand, Marx both praised the development of cooperatives as a victory for the working class in his public speeches and in theoretical works such as Capital analyzed cooperatives as prefiguring, within capitalism, what labor relations will become in communism. On the other hand, Marx insisted that the duty of cooperatives was to gain leverage for the working class to overthrow the capitalist system, thus he also worried that cooperatives might look out only for themselves instead of playing a role in the wider class struggle. As a result, Marx and the wider communist movement would increasingly turn away from bottom-up organization of workers' cooperatives to aim for communist capture of state power as the 19th century progressed; however, this was for what they thought was political expediency, not theoretical necessity. The wider cooperative movement, for its part, continued to be led by people with a variety of opinions on political economy, but were for the most part non- or even anti-Marxist.

=== Early 20th century China ===
China's economic and political condition in the early 20th century is generally regarded as poor. Politically, China entered the 20th century still under the rule of an absolute monarch and while never outright conquered by a Western power, it was still made to sign the unequal treaties which forced China to accept exploitative trading terms and grant what was effectively legal independence to the territorial holdings of foreign powers. The Chinese Emperor was overthrown in 1911 and the Republic of China was proclaimed, but the young republic soon was broken apart by small warlords fighting each other. This dire political situation was accompanied by economic deprivation; outside of Shanghai, China had undergone essentially no industrialization, with most of the population being rural peasants with extremely small land holdings.

=== Traditional Chinese forms of mutual aid ===
While cooperatives as a modern institution responding to the Industrial Revolution are typically credited to Owens and Fourier, the basic principle of mutual aid between those in need is as old as history itself. Pre-modern China's traditions of mutual aid are vast, differing from place to place and time to time. Some examples include: "buying the leg of an ox", whereby a poorer peasant could contribute some money toward a richer peasant's purchase of an ox, and be rewarded with the occasional use of that ox.

== Early cooperatives in China, 1919–1935 ==
=== Xue Xianzhou, the "Father of Chinese Cooperatives" ===
One of the earliest people to promote cooperatives in China was the Chinese professor and banker Xue Xianzhou. In 1919, he, together with students from Fudan University, founded the Shanghai Cooperative Savings Bank. In 1927 he published a proposal entitled, A Plan for the Cooperativization of China. The plan had three main points: first, it called for a National Cooperative Union "to direct training, planning, and 'practical application;'" second, for a Cooperative Training Institute "to conduct six years of training, divided equally between academic studies and practical work;" and third, for a National Cooperative Bank for "financially assisting cooperative enterprises, worker and agricultural enterprises, [and] lightly capitalized businesses." Xue died suddenly in September 1927, not able to see his plans realized.

=== The China International Famine Relief Commission and cooperatives ===
Another major strand of the cooperative movement in China came about as a result of Western charitable responses to the 1920–1921 famine. In February 1921, the China International Famine Relief Commission was chartered to manage the distribution of Western funds raised for Chinese famine relief. Among its various actions, beginning in Hubei in 1923 it started sponsoring the formation of rural credit cooperatives, which peasants would buy into and then be able to take out loans for capital improvement of their farms. These proved quite popular and spread quickly, such that the CIFRC also experimented with sponsoring other forms of cooperatives, such as the mutual aid society, though it is unclear what exactly these did. As the number of credit and other cooperatives expanded, it drew the attention of commercial banks, and eventually the Nationalist government. In 1935 the Cooperative Law was passed, and responsibility for overseeing cooperatives in the Republic of China was transferred to the Cooperative Department of the Ministry of Industries.

== Diverse cooperatives in Nationalist China, 1935–1949 ==
=== Chinese Industrial Cooperative movement ===
The Kuomintang's growing state influence over the cooperative movement was, like all other aspects of Chinese society, upended by the Japanese invasion of 1937. Most cooperative activity, whether CIFRC-inspired, state-directed, or relatively independent, was concentrated in Hebei, Jiangsu, Zhejiang, and Shandong, and thus the diverse strands of the prior movement were almost entirely snuffed out by the invasion. Out of this cooperative vacuum emerged what is likely the most infamous cooperative movement in history: the Chinese Industrial Cooperative movement; aka Indusco; aka Gung-ho.

Indusco was founded by three foreigners – Helen Snow, Edgar Snow, and Rewi Alley – all of whom were long-term Communist sympathizers and were thus for most of their time in China contemptuous of cooperatives, for the same reasons as the later Marx or the early Lenin was. However, in the aftermath of the invasion, Helen Snow, first by herself then in conversation with her husband and Alley, an old friend, developed the idea of a network of rural light-industry cooperatives which would supply the Nationalist army fighting against the Japanese, thus achieving a dual purpose of war support for the country and economic development among the peasantry. After the three of them worked every lead they had with Kuomintang leaders, including Song Qingling, on August 5, 1938, the Chinese Industrial Cooperative Association was founded by an act of the President of the Executive Yuan, Kong Xiangxi. A Chinese associate of Alley, Liu Guangpei, was appointed General Secretary of the Association, and Alley was appointed Technical Advisor. Under Kong's patronage, they set out to organize industrial cooperatives in the countryside as in Snow's plan.

The movement failed. 21st century scholar Jenny Clegg says that Indusco fell "so far short of its ambitions ... as to cast doubt on its credibility." A Japanese intelligence officer reported at the time that the movement was "ludicrous" (馬鹿馬鹿しい). Out of a stated goal of forming 30,000 cooperatives, at its high-water mark in 1941 the movement had organized only 1,867.

Despite the failures, the Chinese Industrial Cooperative movement is noteworthy for several reasons. First, it was the first cooperative movement in China that put industry at the forefront. Second, it was an example of a movement, born of the urgency of the war, that had no qualms about being aggressive with its agenda, yet also trying to balance this with maintaining a traditional cooperative emphasis on grassroots decision-making. Finally, it was the first explicitly left-wing cooperative movement in China: all three founders were Communist sympathizers who sought the approval of Mao.

=== Cooperatives with the Communists in Yan’an ===
When the remnants of the Communist party arrived in Shaanxi after the Long March, the government they established had extremely limited resources, so cooperatives were appealing not only for ideological reasons, but also for practical ones: self-organizing enterprises would require less of scarce state resources than state-directed ones. This was part of the spirit of the Yan’an Rectification Drive, whereby popular management (民辦) was the order of the day. The difficulty in establishing cooperatives, however, lay in the fact that in many areas the populace was so uneducated that the administrative tasks necessary to run an organization like a cooperative were utterly lacking. For this reason the concept of the mutual aid team emerged, as a simple structure that would not require separate administrative skills and yet would both ideologically encourage communal values among the populace and also, hopefully, lead to increased yields. These mutual aid teams were very similar to traditional forms of collaboration and they often simply replicated legacy social relations of aid between kin, although the Communists did their best to encourage the formation of new networks of aid. As mutual aid teams became more experienced throughout the 1940s, the Communists encouraged them to remain in formation year-long, and, when not engaged in the fundamentals of sowing and reaping, put their combined efforts on reclamation of farmland and capital improvements. These efforts produced clear benefit to the populace, and were part of the reason that the Communists were able to maintain their power.

Mutual aid teams were not the full extent of the Communists’ dreams, however. In the areas where the Communists had stronger control and more concentrated personnel they pursued cooperatives with aplomb. Ideally, all productive activity would be organized into cooperative form, and the Communists held up as a model the "comprehensive" cooperative of Liulin village near Yan’an. This single cooperative "combined more than 20 activities which, along with enterprises such as handicraft workshops, retail shops, porterage and team farming, included the collection of grain and salt taxes, the mediation of disputes, marriage brokerage and the management of welfare granaries." This was, of course, exceptional; most cooperatives were far more limited in scope, but the extent of the Liulin cooperative does demonstrate how appropriate the Communists found the cooperative form for almost any problem of economic organization during the uncertainty and limitedness of the Yan’an years.

=== Statistics ===
The following statistics are compiled from surveys carried out by the Nationalist government. They do not capture all cooperative activity going on in China, and evince some clear data quality issues, but nevertheless give an impression of the growth and changes in cooperative activity during the period.

Cooperatives in China by year and type
Year	Total	Credit (%)	Agriculture (%)	Industrial (%)	Marketing (%)	Consumption (%)	Utility (%)	Insurance (%)	Other (%)
1931	1,576	87.50	5.46	5.46	0.82	3.43	0.54	—	2.22
1935	26,224	58.80	8.90	8.90	8.70	—	23.60	—	—
1940	133,542	87.00	7.00	1.70	2.00	1.40	0.30	0.10	0.50
1945	172,053	38.00	18.00	4.90	11.00	14.00	2.80	1.90	9.40
1949	170,181	29.40	22.70	4.80	13.90	14.00	2.50	2.10	10.60

== Cooperatives during the Maoist period, 1949–1978 ==
=== Chronology ===
==== Land Reform Movement, 1946–1953 ====
As justification for the Second United Front, Mao developed the concept of New Democracy, wherein he saw the Communist Party as leading, in alliance with capitalist and other bourgeois elements, a mass nationalist revolution against colonialism and not a proletarian revolution against capitalism, which would be put off for a later, more appropriate moment. Once the Japanese had been defeated in the Second Sino-Japanese War and the Kuomintang had been defeated in the Chinese Civil War, the Party believed that the time had come to promote socialism in China, yet it was subject to the constraint that it had allowed many of its allies to continue to operate in capitalist ways, and it could not turn against them all at once. As a result, at the founding of the People's Republic in 1949, Party leadership was agreed that the socialist transformation of China was to proceed slowly. To strengthen the Party's influence in the countryside, which remained quite tenuous, the Party launched the Land Reform campaign to promote class struggle and land redistribution, which were seen as inseparable; there was to be no redistribution of land without getting the peasantry emotionally and physically involved in the Revolution through class struggle. Through the process of Land Reform, rural land was redistributed from those who were deemed landlords and rich peasants to those who were deemed poor peasants and tenant farmers, so that at the end of a campaign all households within a village would have approximately equal amounts of land. The Land Reform campaign in itself had nothing to do with cooperatives; it strictly reallocated land between individual households, while recruiting families to join their new property into cooperatives was the focus of later campaigns. By 1953, the Land Reform campaign was complete.

==== Early promotion of cooperatives, 1951–1955 ====
The period of 1951–1955 was characterized by frequently changing government policy regarding the economic forms of rural life, though cooperatives feature prominently throughout. The government would hold a single position for months, then abruptly shift to a different position as it struggled to navigate several tensions present in the rural economy:

- First, the Party had from its earliest moments seen agricultural surplus as the economic advantage with which it would support the industrialization of the nation. Accordingly, many voices within the government held that the highest priority regarding rural economic policy should be to maintain rising agricultural output, with all other concerns secondary.
- Second, the Party held as a foundational goal the establishment of a classless, socialist society. Under this framework, Land Reform had been a crucial step forward in combating inequality. However, there remained a worrisome possibility that the richer middle peasants, with their landlords competitors now removed, would dominate in the remaining elements of an individual market economy, while the newly landed poor peasants, still getting adjusted to their new station, would be taken advantage of and fall behind, and thus class inequality would re-emerge. Consequently, some party members urged more rapid promotion of cooperatives and other structures that would protect equality among the peasantry.
- Finally, in most of the Party's thinking, an agricultural cooperative, being much larger than an individual farm plot, would require industrialized agriculture methods. Since China's industrial capacity was so low, and Soviet aid in industrialization would be insufficient to make up the difference, many party members thought that the transition to cooperatives would be technically impossible in the short term.

These tensions were on full display in the early years of the PRC. In 1949 and 1950, the Seventh Central Committee repeatedly affirmed that the long-term future of Chinese agriculture lay in cooperatives, but that the development of cooperatives would take a long time and was not to be rushed. In November 1952 the Central Rural Work Department was created to oversee the process of cooperativization and Deng Zihui was appointed as its head. Deng and Mao advocated a gradual approach to the socialization of agriculture, encouraging the formation of simple Mutual Aid Teams in most villages, and then, in those villages which were especially eager for socialism, the establishment of Elementary Agricultural Production Cooperatives.

==== The "high tide" of cooperativization, 1955–1958 ====
On July 31, 1955, Mao delivered the report "On the Co-operative Transformation of Agriculture", in which he unexpectedly critiqued the pace of cooperative development so far and urged that peasant farmers be organized into cooperatives much more quickly. His words were heeded, and by the end of 1958 most of the population had been organized into Advanced Agricultural Production Cooperatives.

==== Great Leap Forward and collectivization, 1958–1978 ====
In 1958, as part of the Great Leap Forward, the Advanced Agricultural Production Cooperatives were transformed into the People's Communes. These institutions were conceived of as top-down, local units of the state and are so far from the bottom-up, autonomous associations of the Owenite tradition that they are not regarded as cooperatives by the wider cooperative movement, nor were they called cooperatives in Chinese. For the rest of the Maoist period, it was the People's Communes, not cooperatives, that were the primary, often the only, economic institution that played a role in people's lives.

=== Types of cooperatives ===
The Communists were already running into difficulties with maintaining enough qualified personnel to implement their agenda in Yan’an, and after their victory in the Civil War, their personnel shortages became gargantuan, which led to the recruitment of sometimes extremely ill-prepared cadres. Consequently, the intended plans of the Communist leadership could become something else entirely in the hands of local cadres working in a particular village. Hence, any description of how cooperatives were intended to work in the early Maoist period can vary greatly from cooperatives as implemented; the extreme shortage of cadres with requisite skills and the constantly changing political environment led to rules broken as often as observed, and for that matter, rules rewritten almost as soon as they were published. Nevertheless, there were templates that informed the process of cooperativization, which are listed here.

==== Mutual Aid Team ====
Mutual Aid Team
- Simplified Chinese: 互助组
- Traditional Chinese: 互助組
Transcriptions
Standard Mandarin
- Hanyu Pinyin: hùzhùzǔ
- Gwoyeu Romatzyh: huhjuhtzuu
- Wade–Giles: hu^{4}-chu^{4}-tsu^{3}

The Mutual Aid Team was the simplest form of cooperation that the Party promoted and in the early years of cooperativizaion often served as the introduction to socialism for most peasants. As previously discussed, this was not an invention of the People's Republic era, but was a form that had served the Party well in the Yan’an years. While the Mutual Aid Team is frequently discussed in connection with cooperatives, in a technical sense, it was not a cooperative at all. There was no separate direction, or accounting, or leadership in a Mutual Aid Team. They were merely small groups of peasants, often neighbors, who were encouraged by local Party cadres to help each other out with agricultural work and lend each other farming assets, such as tools or beasts of burden. In fact, in the aftermath of land reform, a Mutual Aid Team of poor or middle peasants was often in the position of reassembling the assets of their former landlords – whereas before land reform, as tenants, they would have borrowed the landlord's assets, after land reform one person had an ox, another the yoke, and the Mutual Aid Team put the pieces back together for each other's use. Because of their small scale and little complication, the Mutual Aid Team was more easily comprehensible for the vast majority of the population which had not yet gotten an understanding of the communist principles underlying their new government, and for this reason the Mutual Aid Team was promoted by the Party in the early years to serve as the first opportunity for peasants to develop a socialist, collective consciousness.

==== Supply and Marketing Cooperative ====
Supply and Marketing Cooperative
- Simplified Chinese: 供销合作社
- Traditional Chinese: 供銷合作社
Transcriptions
Standard Mandarin
- Hanyu Pinyin: gōngxiāo hézuòshè
- Wade–Giles: kung^{1}-hsiao^{1} ho^{2}-tso^{4}-shê^{4}

The Supply and Marketing Cooperative was a cooperative structure for providing peasant farmers with a means to acquire tools and sell their produce. This was a true cooperative, where an individual would buy into the cooperative at an equal price to receive an equal share, which entitled the member to an equal vote. The purpose of the cooperative was, according to Party member Li Renliu: "to enable producers to buy tools and materials more easily while also receiving a reasonable price for their products." Thus, the SMC was the interface between the local economy of the peasant and the economy of the state. In the early years, many peasants did not interface with the SMC directly, but rather with private traders that would gather produce and sell it to the SMC. In 1953, however, a law was passed implementing the system known as "Unified Purchase and Unified Supply." This mandated that peasants offer all their surplus produce to the SMC at prices set by the government. As a result of this law, the purchasing practices of the SMC became of much greater importance to the peasantry, and the system whereby the SMC would sign advanced contracts with peasants for a certain quantity of crop became the primary funding source for the peasantry in the 1954 harvests.

==== Agricultural Producer Cooperative ====
Elementary Agricultural Production Cooperative
- Simplified Chinese: 初级农业生产合作社
- Traditional Chinese: 初級農業生產合作社
Transcriptions
Standard Mandarin
- Hanyu Pinyin: chūjí nóngyè shēngchǎn hézuòshè
- Wade–Giles: chʻu^{1}-chi^{2} nung^{2}-yeh^{4} shêng^{1}-chʻan^{3} ho^{2}-tso^{4}-shê^{4}

In the Party's agricultural plans, there were two grades of agricultural producer cooperatives. The lower grade, the Elementary Agricultural Production Cooperative, operated on the principle of compensation to members based on both contributed labor and contributed capital. For this reason, it was deemed "semi-socialist" – labor and its fruits were shared, but in addition there was still compensation on the basis of preexisting capital. The particulars of this balancing act: how much to give for capital and how much to give for labor; whether the capital remuneration was a fixed amount or a percentage of income; how to calculate the value of the capital contributed (since almost all contribution were in-kind, not cash); how to calculate the value of the labor; etc., were all in principle and in practice left to the individual cooperatives to decide.

Advanced Agricultural Production Cooperative
- Simplified Chinese: 高级农业生产合作社
- Traditional Chinese: 高級農業生產合作社
Transcriptions
Standard Mandarin
- Hanyu Pinyin: gāojí nóngyè shēngchǎn hézuòshè
- Wade–Giles: kao^{1}-chi^{2} nung^{2}-yeh^{4} shêng^{1}-chʻan^{3} ho^{2}-tso^{4}-shê^{4}

The higher grade of cooperative – the Advanced Agricultural Production Cooperative – appears to have been already theorized early in the Party's planning; it would be an agricultural cooperative where members were compensated entirely on their labor, without regard to the capital they had once contributed.

==== Handicraft Cooperative ====
Handicraft Cooperative
- Simplified Chinese: 手工业合作社
- Traditional Chinese: 手工業合作社
Transcriptions
Standard Mandarin
- Hanyu Pinyin: shǒugōngyè hézuòshè
- Wade–Giles: shou^{3}-kung^{1}-yeh^{4} ho^{2}-tso^{4}-shê^{4}

The Handicraft Cooperative was the analogue for rural craftsmen of the what the Elementary Agricultural Production Cooperative was for rural farmers. When it fell time for a village's agriculture to be organized into elementary agricultural production cooperatives, if there was a significant craft industry, it would be organized into a cooperative as well, which mutatis mutandis worked the same way. However, in contrast to the role of the agricultural production cooperatives, which were to pioneer the future of socialist agriculture, industrial cooperatives in China were conceived of in a very different way. The Party distinguished between mechanized industry and industry run by traditional craftsmen, calling the latter handicrafts (thus giving the word a technical meaning wider than common English usage). In keeping with their Marxist foundation, the Party held that the future of socialist material production lay entirely with mechanized industry, while handicrafts were destined for historical obsolescence. Unfortunately, a large majority of China's industrial capacity lay in handicrafts. Thus, the Party did organize the handicraft industry into cooperatives, but only either to cause them to mature into mechanized industry and be taken over as state-owned enterprises or to guide them into the dustbin of history. In keeping with this idea, the number of peasants allowed to join the new handicraft cooperative was strictly limited; thus families and other social units that had previously shifted between handicraft and agricultural work according to demand were now divided into one or the other.
