= Albert Denison =

Albert Denison may refer to:

- Albert Denison, 1st Baron Londesborough (1805–1860), British politician and diplomat
- Albert Denison (Royal Navy officer) (1835–1903), his son, officer in the British Royal Navy
