= Chinese Industrial Cooperatives =

Industrial war effort

Chinese Industrial Cooperatives (Chinese: 工業合作社; pinyin: Gōngyè Hézuòshè; lit. 'industrial cooperative(s)') (CICs) were organisations established in China during the Second Sino-Japanese War (1937–1945) to support China's war effort by organizing small-scale grassroots industrial and economic development. The movement was led by the Chinese Industrial Cooperative Association (CICA or Indusco), founded in 1938 by foreign and Chinese activists. Its international arm the International Committee for the Promotion of Chinese Industrial Cooperatives (ICCIC, also known by the nickname Gung Ho International Committee) was founded in 1939 in British Hong Kong to promote cooperatives in China.

The movement was especially active in the 1930s and 1940s with support from both left and right wings of Chinese politics. The movement disappeared after the 1950s after the establishment of the People's Republic of China government, but CICA and ICCIC were revived in the 1980s and are still active in the twenty-first century.

In the English-speaking world, the industrial cooperatives' best known legacy is the term "gung-ho", which came to mean "overly enthusiastic," but had no relation to its meaning in Chinese, stemming from the shortened name 工合 (pinyin: gōnghé; lit. 'industrial cooperative(s)').

== History ==
The Gung Ho (Chinese: 工合; pinyin: gōnghé; lit. 'industrial cooperative(s)') movement was first initiated in Shanghai in 1937. Some of the principal organizers were Rewi Alley of New Zealand, Edgar Snow, Nym Wales (Helen Foster Snow), and Ida Pruitt of the US, as well as a group of Chinese including Hu Yuzhi (胡愈之) and Sha Qianli (沙千里). In August 1938, the CICA was established. It was founded in the wartime capital Hankow when China was engaged in the Second Sino-Japanese War. Through the sponsorship of Madame Chiang Kai-shek, Finance Minister Dr. H. H. Kung supplied government financial support.

The movement aimed to organize unemployed workers and refugees, increasing production to support the war effort. The goal was to replace industrial capacity lost to bombing by dispersing and giving workers voting shares in their CICs. The CICA organized small scale self-supporting cooperatives, mainly in rural areas, to create employment for workers and refugees and produce goods for the war effort.

In January 1939, the international arm ICCIC was established in Hong Kong. Ms. Soong Ching-ling was elected honorary chair and the Anglican Bishop of Hong Kong, the Right Rev. Ronald O. Hall to be chair, and Dr. Chen Hansheng was appointed as secretary general. Rev. Dr. Walter Brooks Foley, pastor of Union Church of Manila, Philippines, serve on the international committee, along with leading Chinese businessmen in Manila Dee C. Chuan, Alfonso Sycip, and Yu Khe thai. Foley became president of the Philippine Association of Chinese Industrial Cooperatives.

In 1941, the Gung Ho movement reached its peak: around 3,000 cooperatives with a combined membership of nearly 300,000 people were functioning. Their factories produced more than 500 products for the local people, and a large number of blankets, uniforms and other army supplies for the battlefront. Ida Pruitt toured the United States to raise substantial financial support. The unique role of Gung Ho cooperatives in the war also won such international acclaim that the term "gung-ho" became a famous slogan of the U.S. Marine Corps. Adopting the literal meanings of the two characters separately as "work" and "together", the slogan entered the English language as a term denoting whole-hearted dedication to a meaningful cause.

Both the Nationalist government of Chiang Kai-shek and the Communist movement of Mao Zedong supported the movement and tried to control it. Alley placated the Nationalists but his sympathies and eventual loyalties were to the emerging Communist government. In 1942, Alley was dismissed from Gung Ho by the government of Chiang Kai-shek. After Mao's victory in 1949 Alley stayed in China, but there was no need for the CICA and ICCIC. Both CICA and ICCIC suspended their works in 1952.

Graham Peck reports in colorful but analytical detail in Two Kinds of Time He traveled with Alley to a number of CICs early in 1941 and saw them at their height, but he came to understand their limitations and the fact that their course was ultimately downwards, not upwards.

== Revival ==
The CICA was revived in 1983, and the ICCIC was revived in 1987 in Beijing by Alley and other former Gung Ho leaders. The reorganized ICCIC registered with the Ministry of Civil Affairs of People's Republic of China as an international non-profit organization. Zhu Xuefan (朱學範) was elected as honorary chair and Alley as chair.

The main task of the revived ICCIC is the promotion of cooperatives in China. Membership is open to all individuals and organizations who support the cooperative movement. The committee has approximately 100 members from China, Australia, Germany, Belgium, France, Japan, Mexico, Singapore, the United Kingdom, the United States of America, and Hong Kong. The ICCIC's General Assembly of all members meets every five years. The executive board elected by the Assembly is responsible for decision-making on major issues according to its articles of association during the adjournment of the Assembly. A secretariat is set up to handle day-to-day work.

== See also ==
- Evans Carlson
- Helen Foster Snow
- Gung-ho
- Industry of China
- History of the cooperative movement in China
