= Charles Vyse =

English potter

Charles Vyse (1882 Staffordshire - 1971 Deal, Kent), was an English studio potter, noted for producing colourful figurines of characters seen on London streets.

Charles was part of a Staffordshire family that had traditionally been involved in the pottery industry. He was apprenticed to Doulton in Burslem at age fourteen as a modeller and designer, and trained by Charles Noke. Henry Doulton saw his potential and steered him to the Hanley Art School where he won a scholarship to the Royal College of Art in London. At the RCA he studied sculpture: his years there were from 1905 to 1910, including a travelling scholarship to visit Italy in 1909. In 1911 he became a member of the Royal British Society of Sculptors and married Nell (1892-1967). In 1912 he studied at the Camberwell School of Art.

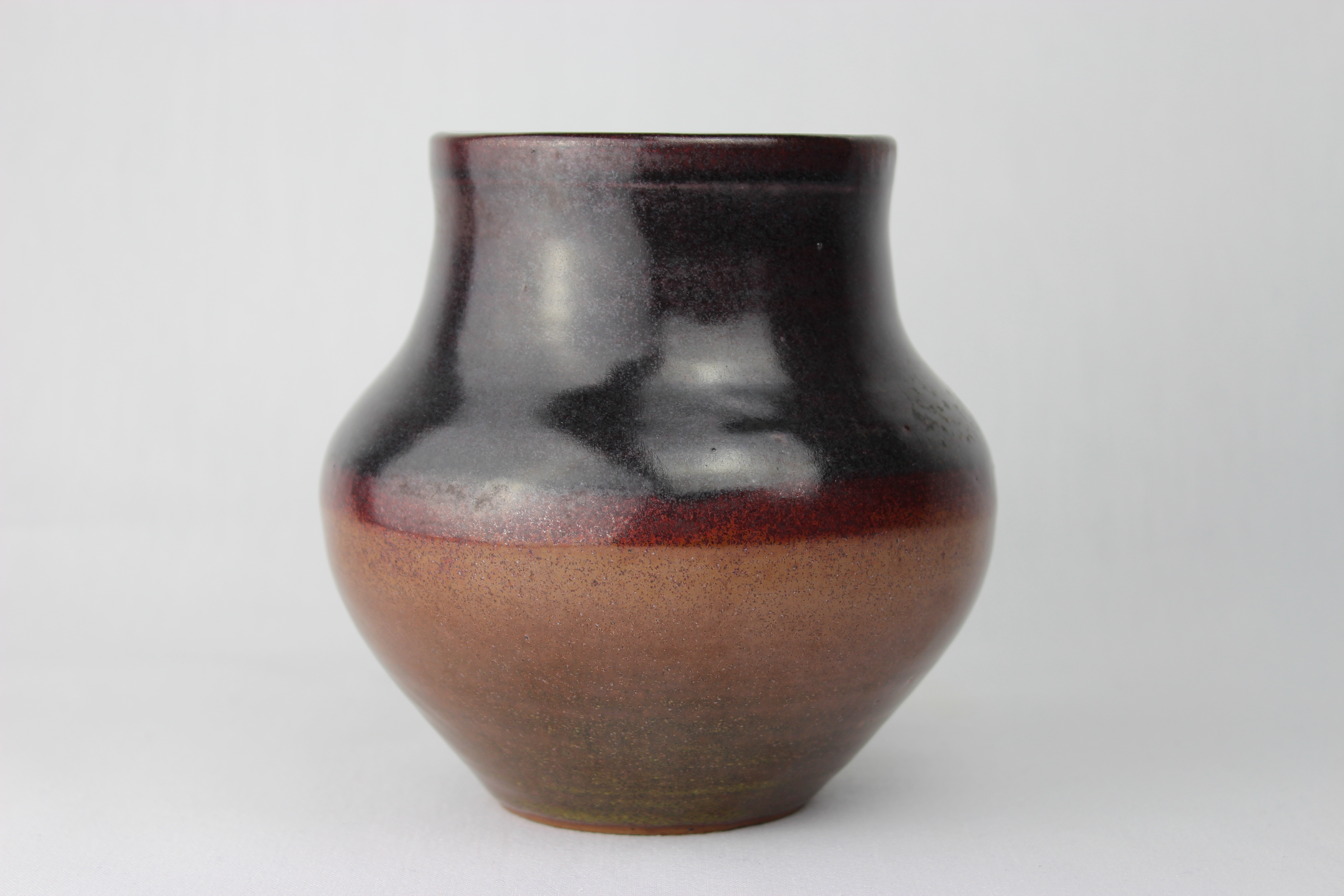
Jar with iron glaze by Charles Vyse. From the W.A. Ismay Studio Ceramics Collection at York Art Gallery.

In 1914 Vyse executed a frieze depicting potters and miners above the entrance to a new technical college in Stoke-on-Trent (now Staffordshire University). The frieze is in Hollington sandstone, and shows the influence of the New Sculpture movement.

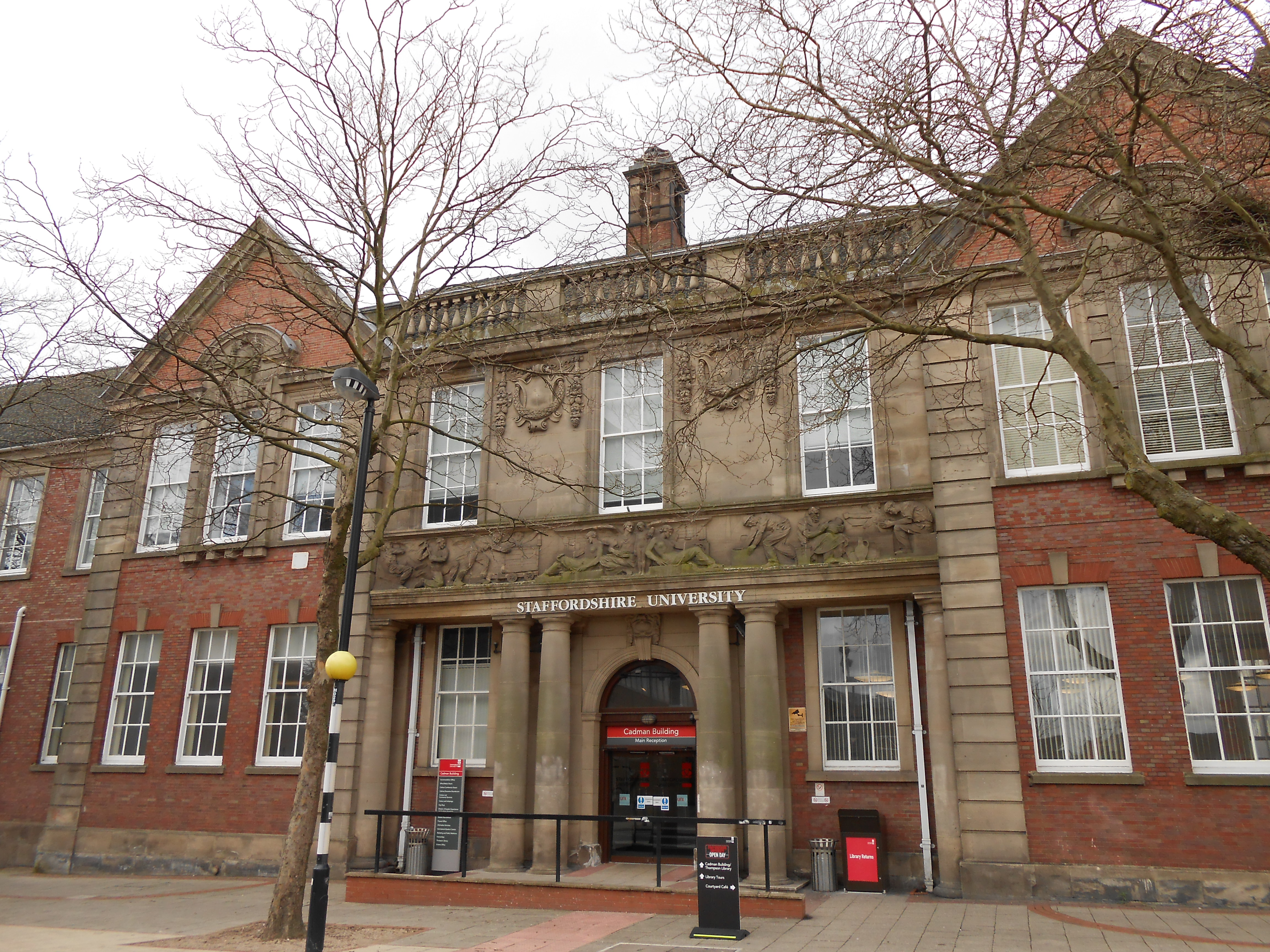
Former technical college, Stoke, with Vyse's frieze above the entrance

Doulton produced designs by Vyse in the inter-war period, for example a figurine called "Darling". However, Vyse is best-remembered for the thousands of pieces produced by a studio pottery at Cheyne Walk in Chelsea, which he started in 1919 with his wife. Here they produced figurines based on ordinary people seen in London. These slip-cast statuettes proved to be extremely popular and a number of women were employed to produce them. Their studio pottery also produced two other types of ware: revivalist oriental forms and glazes, and art deco hand-decorated functional stoneware.

Vyse's neighbour, George Eumorfopoulos, had amassed a large collection of Chinese Sung, Korean and Persian pottery. These caught Vyse's interest, and he started experimenting in the Sung style. Nell, who had trained as a singer, had also studied German and French, enabling her to decipher 19th century works on early Chinese glazes and Charles to reproduce chun (an iron glaze used in Chinese celadon ware), tenmoku and T'zu-chou stoneware glazes. Their experiments with oriental glazes established that the blue in celadons was due to iron and not copper as had been thought. Their work was sold at Walker's Gallery in New Bond Street.

The Cheyne Walk studio was bombed in the blitz of 1940 obliging Vyse to teach at Farnham School of Art. His relationship with Nell also ended at this time, and she devoted herself to left-wing politics, having been a suffragette in her early years. When the war ended, he resumed making the character figurines with the assistance of one of the Farnham students, Barbara Waller. His annual exhibitions at Walker's were resumed from 1950 up to his retirement in 1963.

Charles' and Nell's work is to be seen in the Victoria and Albert Museum, York City Art Gallery, Aberystwyth University and Stoke-on-Trent.

== See also ==
- List of Royal Doulton figurines

== Bibliography ==
- Dennis, Richard Figures and stoneware pottery by Charles Vyse 1882-1971 London, Richard Dennis, 1974. Catalogue of a 1974 London exhibition
