= Robert Lockhart Hobson =

British civil servant and antiquarian

Robert Lockhart Hobson, 1934

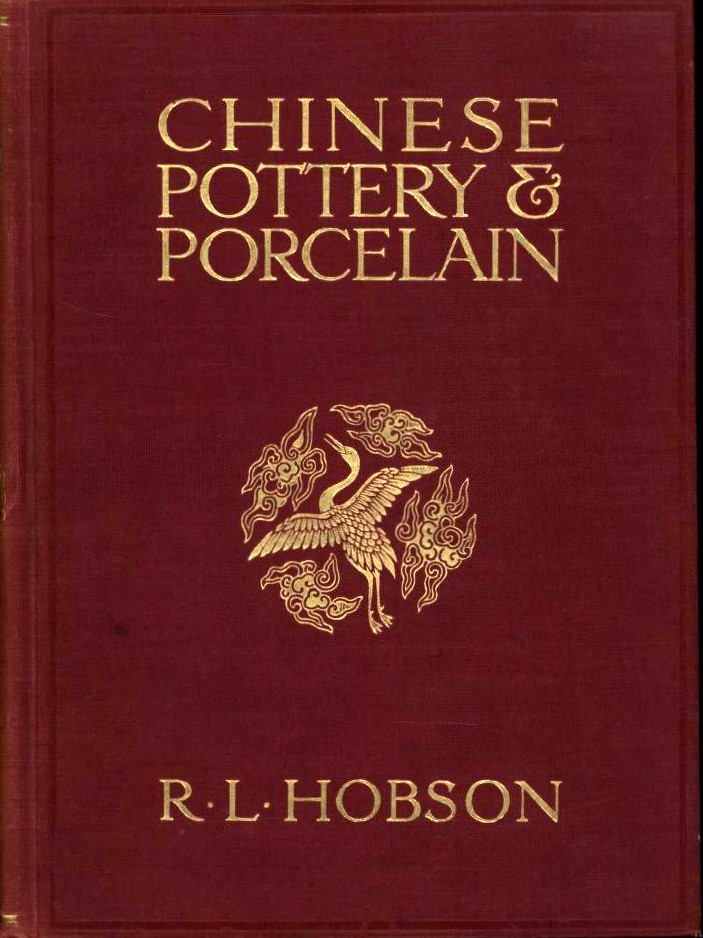
The cover of Chinese pottery and porcelain, 1915

Robert Lockhart Hobson CB (26 July 1872 – 5 June 1941) was a British civil servant and antiquarian. He was keeper of the Department of Ceramics and Ethnography at the British Museum and an authority on Far Eastern ceramics. He was noted for his cataloguing which The Times described as establishing firm facts for what had previously been "surmise and unproved tradition" and he was highly influential through his writing in the elevation of Chinese ceramics from craft works to the status of objects of fine art. He was president of the Oriental Ceramic Society from 1939 to 1942.

== Early life ==
Robert Hobson was born at Lambeg, County Antrim, Ireland, in 1872, the son of Reverend Canon William Thomas Hobson of the Isle of Man and Eliza Ann Dalglish. He had a brother, William Dalglish Hobson, born in 1886. He was educated at St John's School, Leatherhead, and received his advanced education at Jesus College, University of Cambridge, from where he graduated with a first-class degree in classics in 1893.

== Marriage ==
In 1900, Hobson married the Honourable Daisy Denison, daughter of Rear-Admiral Hon. Albert Denison and granddaughter of Albert Denison, 1st Baron Londesborough. In 1938, Daisy was granted the rank of a Baron's daughter which would have been hers had her father survived to succeed as Lord Londesborough. She died in 1967.

== Career ==
Hobson worked as a school teacher for four years before joining the British Museum in 1897. He served as a lieutenant in the Civil Service Rifles, part of the London Regiment, from 1914 to 1919. In 1921 he was made keeper of the Department of Ceramics and Ethnography which was formed for him. He gave evidence to the Royal Commission on National Museums and Galleries. He was appointed a member of the Order of the Bath in 1931. In 1934 he was made keeper of Oriental Antiquities and Ethnography, a position he held until his retirement in 1938 at which time he was presented with the gift of a portrait by Francis Dodd RA.

He was closely associated with the China exhibitions at Burlington House in 1909–1910, 1915–16, and 1935–1936 the last of which was visited by over 401,000 people.

He was one of the founding members of the Oriental Ceramic Society, and after his retirement, chairman (or president) from 1939 to 1942 in succession to George Eumorfopoulos. His successor was Sir Alan Barlow.

== Writing ==
Hobson completed two standard catalogues of the English pottery and porcelain in the British Museum. The catalogue of pottery was the first to include a section on medieval pottery of which the British Museum was a leader in establishing a reference collection. He wrote the entry on ceramics for the 1911 edition of the Encyclopædia Britannica and the entry on the Orientalist Stephen Wootton Bushell for the Dictionary of National Biography (1912).

He later turned his attention to far eastern ceramics and became a noted scholar of Qing dynasty works. He was one of the first to explicitly date the earliest blue and white porcelain to the Song dynasty when most scholars still placed it in the Ming period, indicating his awareness of the latest archaeological excavations. His The wares of the Ming Dynasty (1923) was described by John Alexander Pope as an early attempt at an "overall objective classification of Ming wares" and a "kind of landmark" as a more critical approach began to enter the field of Chinese ceramics and he was highly influential through his writing in the elevation of Chinese ceramics from craft works to the status of objects of fine art.

He compiled a catalogue of the pottery and porcelain in the George Eumorfopoulos collection which was published in six volumes from 1925 to 1928.

== Death and legacy ==
Hobson died at his home in Horsham on 5 June 1941. He was survived by his wife Daisy to whom probate was granted on an estate of £7,171 net. He received obituaries in the Transactions of the Oriental Ceramic Society, The Burlington Magazine for Connoisseurs, and The Times.

== Selected publications ==
- Catalogue of the collection of English pottery in the Department of British and Mediæval Antiquities and Ethnography of the British Museum. London, British Museum, 1903.
- Catalogue of the collection of English porcelain in the Department of British and Mediaeval Antiquities and Ethnography of the British Museum. British Museum, London, 1905.
- Porcelain, oriental, continental and British: A book of handy reference for collectors. Constable, London, 1906. (2nd 1908)
- Handbook of marks on pottery and porcelain. Macmillan, London, 1909. Revised editions 1912, 1919. (With William Burton (1863–1941))
- Worcester porcelain: A description of the ware from the wall period to the present day &c. Bernard Quaritch, London, 1910.
- Catalogue of porcelain, furniture and other works of art in the collection of Lady Wantage &c. W.H. Fairbairns, Enfield, 1912. (With Oliver Brackett)
- Chinese pottery and porcelain. An account of the potter's art in China from primitive times to the present day. Two volumes. Cassell and Co., London, 1915. Volume I, Volume II.
- Catalogue of the Frank Lloyd Collection of Worcester porcelain of the wall period. British Museum, London, 1923.
- The wares of the Ming Dynasty. Ernest Benn, London, 1923.
- The art of the Chinese potter. Ernest Benn, London, 1923. (With A.L. Hetherington)
- The later ceramic wares of China: Being the blue and white, famille verte, famille rose, monochromes, etc., of the K'ang Hsi, Yung Cheng, Ch'ien Lung and other periods of the Ch'ing Dynasty. Ernest Benn, London, 1925.
- The George Eumorfopoulos collection: Catalogue of the Chinese, Corean and Persian pottery and porcelain. Six volumes. Ernest Benn, London, 1925–28.
- Chinese porcelain & Wedgwood pottery, with other works of ceramic art &c. B.T. Batsford, London, 1928. (A record of the collection in the Lady Lever Art Gallery. Vol. 2.)
- Catalogue of the Leonard Gow Collection of Chinese porcelain. George W. Jones, London, 1931. (Limited to 300 copies)
- Chinese ceramics in private collections. Halton & Truscott Smith, 1931. (With Bernard Rackham & William King)

== See also ==
- Laurence Binyon
- Percival David
- Augustus Wollaston Franks
