= Beth McKillop =

British sinologist and Koreanist (1953–2026)

- Born: Elizabeth Dorothy McConochie; 28 May 1953; Glasgow, Scotland
- Died: 26 May 2026 (aged 72)

Academic background
- Education: Churchill College, Cambridge

Academic work
- Discipline: Print Culture and Art History
- Institutions: British Library; Victoria and Albert Museum; SOAS

Elizabeth Dorothy McKillop (née McConochie; 28 May 1953 – 26 May 2026) was a British sinologist and Koreanist with particular expertise in print culture and Joseon ceramics, and established London's first dedicated gallery of Korean art. She was a Senior Research Fellow at the Victoria and Albert Museum and a Senior Teaching Fellow in the Department of History of Art and Archaeology at SOAS.

== Early life and education ==
Elizabeth Dorothy McConochie was born in Glasgow, Scotland on 28 May 1953. She earned a degree in general humanities from the University of Glasgow before pursuing an MA in Chinese Studies at Churchill College, Cambridge, where she was among the first cohort of women admitted. At Cambridge, she specialized in modern Chinese history under Martin Bernal. After graduating in 1975, she was selected by the British Council as one of ten students to participate in an exchange program in China, studying first at the Foreign Language Institute and later at Peking University. In the early 1980s, McKillop studied Korean language under the guidance of William Skillend at SOAS.

== Career ==
=== 1981–2004 ===
After briefly working for the BBC Monitoring Service, summarizing Chinese broadcasts, McKillop joined the British Library in 1981 as a research assistant in the Chinese section of the Department of Oriental Manuscripts and Printed Books and later became Curator for the Chinese and Korean collections. In addition to cataloging books and curating exhibitions, McKillop collaborated with Frances Wood, the Head of Section, and visiting scholars from the Chinese Academy of Social Studies on the Aurel Stein collection of Dunhuang manuscripts housed at the British Library. One outcome of this collaboration was the publication of a multi-volume photographic facsimile of non-Buddhist Chinese texts from Dunhuang, co-published by the British Library and the Sichuan People's Publishing House.

From 1990 to 1993, McKillop was seconded to the Victoria and Albert Museum, as the Samsung Curator of Korean Art, where she established London's first dedicated gallery of Korean art. In addition to curating the gallery, she authored its accompanying book and traveled to South Korea to acquire contemporary works.

Returning to the British Library in 1993 as Curator of the Chinese and Korean Collections, McKillop conducted extensive research on the library's Korean holdings, identifying previously unnoted early Korean editions. In collaboration with bibliographic expert Fujimoto Yukio, she led a three-year cataloging project of the British Library's Korean holdings. During this period, her responsibilities expanded outside of her home department and included overseeing the planning and execution of the relocation of collections and staff to the British Library's new St. Pancras site.

Following the establishment of diplomatic relations between the UK and the North Korea in 2000, McKillop made two visits to the country as part of a delegation from the British Museum and the British Library. The goal of these trips was to initiate scholarly exchanges and to acquire North Korean publications of scholarly and reference value for the Library.

=== 2004–2026 ===
In 2004, McKillop returned to the Victoria and Albert Museum as Keeper of Asia, later serving as Director of Collections, and eventually, deputy director. During her tenure as Keeper of Asia, the V&A staged Europe's first comprehensive study of Chinese architecture, fashion, and graphics in the reform and opening up era, China Design Now. The show went on to tour the United States. Another major project during this time was the creation of the Robert H. N. Ho Family Foundation Galleries of Buddhist art. She retired from the V&A in 2016.

McKillop remained active in the fields of Chinese and Korean culture. In 2019, she originated the course on the history of Korean books and printing at the Rare Book School. She was a trustee of National Museums Scotland, and the Sir Percival David Foundation of Chinese Art. She served as president of the Oriental Ceramic Society from 2018 to 2021.

== Death ==
McKillop died from breast cancer on 26 May 2026, two days shy of her 73rd birthday.

== Sources ==
- Kneebone, Roger. "Beth McKillop in conversation with Roger Kneebone". Roger Kneebone.
- McKillop, Beth (21 November 2018). "Fortunate to Have Studied in Cambridge". Churchill Review: 72.
- McKillop, Beth (2015). "The World through Different Eyes". V&A Magazine (Autumn/Winter): 30.
- McKillop, Beth; Portal, Jane; Anderson, Robert (2004). "Visits to North Korea, 2001-2: Building Cultural Links". In Portal, Jane; McKillop, Beth (eds.). North Korea Culture and Society. London: British Museum Press. p. 51. ISBN 0861591518.
- Wood, Frances (2000). Hand-Grenade Practice in Peking: My Part in the Cultural Revolution. London: John Murray. p. 23. ISBN 0-7195-5781-X.

== Selected bibliography ==
- McKillop, Beth (2024). Precious beyond measure: a history of Korean ceramics. London: Reaktion Books. ISBN 9781789148671.
- McKillop, Beth (2013). "Korea". In Suarez, Michael F.; Woudhuysen, H. R. (eds.). The Book: A Global History. Oxford University Press. pp. 593–604. ISBN 9780199679416.
- McKillop, Beth (2010). "A Royal Manuscript of 1809 in the British Library". The International Journal of Korean Art and Archaeology. 4: 174–187. doi:10.23158/jkaa.2010.v4_09.
- Fujimoto, Yukio; McKillop, Elizabeth D. (July 2010). "大英図書館所蔵朝鮮本に就いて (Korean Books at the British Library)". Chosen Gakuho:Journal of the Academic Association of Koreanology in Japan. (216).
- McKillop, Beth (1998). "A Korean Buddhist Illustrated Manuscript". The British Library Journal. 24 (1): 158–167. JSTOR 42554495.
- McKillop, Beth (1992). Korean Art & Design. London: Victoria and Albert Museum. ISBN 9781851771042.
