= Oriental Ceramic Society =

Uk-based artistic society

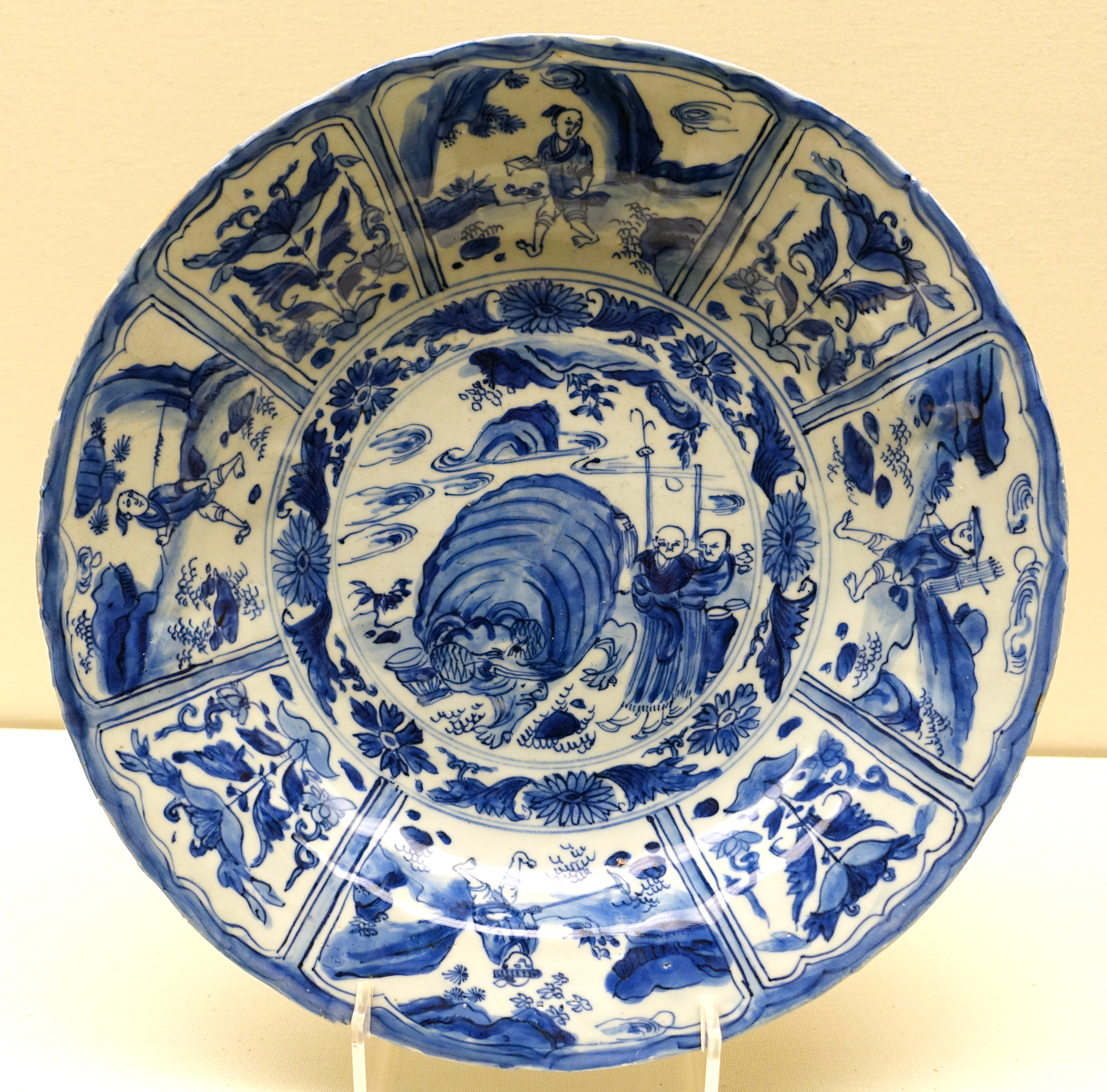
Chinese transitional period blue and white porcelain dish, mid 17th century. Ethnological Museum, Berlin.

The Oriental Ceramic Society (OCS) is one of the leading international societies for the study and appreciation of Asian art, with a special interest in ceramics. However its wider focus is the study and appreciation of all aspects of oriental art, and over the last 90 years has served as one of the main bodies assisting the understanding of oriental art, and oriental ceramics in particular, by means of organising regular meetings, lectures and publications.

== History ==
The Society was founded in London in 1921 by a group of collectors and others interested in oriental ceramics. Since then, many notable art historians and collectors have joined the OCS, have given lectures to the Society and have written articles for publication in the annual Transactions of the Oriental Ceramic Society (TOCS, currently edited by Dr Stacey Pierson). The Transactions are a highly regarded journal on Asian art, and the annual Newsletter brings news on Asian art from around the world. Through lectures, handling sessions, exhibitions and publications, the Society has provided an influential forum in which its members have developed and exchanged their knowledge with experts and academics.

In the 1950s and ‘60s a regular exhibition programme was organised, which consecutively covered the arts of the major Chinese dynasties, Tang (618–907), Song (960–1279), Ming (1368–1644) and Qing (1644–1911), but also highlighted special topics such as the various Song dynasty ceramics, and blue-and-white, monochrome and polychrome wares from the Ming and Qing. These exhibitions were mounted at the Arts Council Gallery in St. James, London. The Silver Jubilee of the Society in 1971 saw a major exhibition on The Ceramic Art of China held at the Victoria and Albert Museum, London.

In 2021 the Society held an exhibition curated by Sarah Wong to mark 100 years since its foundation.

== Activities ==
The Society continues to provide academic and introductory lectures throughout the year on all aspects of Asian art, in particular on Chinese ceramics, jades, paintings and Middle Eastern art. It hosts handling sessions of items from the main London museums, such as the British Museum and the Victoria and Albert Museum, as well as members’ collections. It has traditionally organised outings to English country houses, visits to private collections, guided tours to exhibitions as well as overseas trips as a means to promote the subject and as an educational resource. The Society currently has members throughout the world, and its meetings in London are mostly held on the premises of the Society of Antiquaries, next to the Royal Academy of Arts, Piccadilly (although activities are also organised in New York). The Society's patron is The Duke of Gloucester.

== Presidents of the society ==
- 1921–39 George Eumorfopoulos
- 1939–42 Robert Lockhart Hobson
- 1943–64 Sir Alan Barlow
- 1964–67 G. St.G. M. Gompertz
- 1967–70 Sir Harry Garner
- 1970–74 Basil Gray
- 1974–77 Sir John Addis
- 1977–78 Basil Gray
- 1978–80 Mary Tregear
- 1980–84 Prof. William Watson
- 1984–86 John Ayers
- 1986–90 Sir John Figgess
- 1990–92 Margaret Medley
- 1992–97 Jessica Rawson
- 1997–2000 Oliver Impey
- 2000–03 Rose Kerr
- 2003–06 Carol Michaelson
- 2006–09 Rosemary Scott
- 2009–12 Shelagh Vainker
- 2012–15 Regina Krahl
- 2015–18 Jessica Harrison-Hall
- 2018–2021 Beth McKillop
- 2021-date Stacey Pierson

== Selected publications ==
Publications of the society include:

- 1947 Ayers, John; Impey, O. R.; Mallet, J. V. G., Porcelain for palaces: the fashion for Japan in Europe, 1650–1750 (OCS, London, 1947).
- 1947 Hetherington, A. L., Exhibition of celadon wares (OCS, London, 1947).
- 1948 Oriental Ceramic Society, Chinese ceramic figures: catalogue of an exhibition held by the Oriental Ceramic Society from 8 April to 21 June, 1947 (OCS, London, 1948).
- 1949 Oriental Ceramic Society, Wares of the Tʻang dynasty: catalogue of an exhibition held by the Oriental Ceramic Society from 27 April to 8 June 1949 (OCS, London, 1949).
- TOCS 74 (2009–10), paperback, with essays on Qianlong porcelain; Westerners in Shekwan ceramics; Meiji ceramics for Japan; architectural ceramics; 12–17th c. Chinese jades; Transitional Jingdezhen kiln sites; Northern Song ceramic ownership; and Korean ceramic in the V&A.
- TOCS 75 (2010–11), paperback, with essays on Southeast Asian ceramics; Chinese Export ceramics in the V&A; Yongle porcelains; Syrian glass; Kakiemon; British Museum jades; and Jiangxi ceramics.
- TOCS 76 (2011–12), paperback, with essays on Chinese porcelain in Fustat; the Qianlong emperor and ‘Ge ware;’ Temmoku; Islamic Art at the Met; a Japanese garniture from Althorp; Mughal jade; Han life and afterlife; and OCS history.
- TOCS 77 (2012–13), paperback, with essays on The Bluett Archive; Chinamania; Chinese porcelain in Spain during the Habsburg dynasty; and Recycled Archaic Jades.

== References and sources ==
Sources

- Davids, R., Jellinek, D., PROVENANCE. Collectors, Dealers and Scholars in the Field of Chinese Ceramics in Britain and America, (Great Haseley, 2011) (including a list of the member of the Oriental Ceramic Society 1942–1943).
- Elias, H., Eskenazi, G., A Dealer's Hand: The Chinese Art World through the Eyes of Giuseppe Eskenazi (Scala, 2012).
- Pierson, S., 'Scholarship and Exhibitions: the Oriental Ceramic Society and its Public Activities, 1921–1945', in Collectors, collections and museums: the field of Chinese ceramics in Britain, 1560–1960 (P. Lang, Oxford/New York, 2007).
- Winkworth, W. W., 'Art-history and the Oriental Ceramic Society', Burlington Magazine, Vol. 89, No. 526 (Jan. 1947), pp. 13–15.
