= Robert Jacquinot de Besange =

French missionary and Jesuit

Robert Jacquinot de Besange SJ
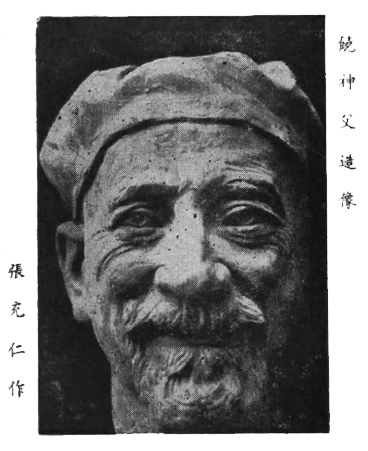
- Sculpture of de Besange c.1940 by Zhang Chongren

Personal life
- Born: Robert Charles Joseph Emile Jacquinot de Besange; 15 March 1878 Saintes, French Third Republic
- Died: 10 September 1946 (aged 68) Berlin, Germany

Religious life
- Religion: Roman Catholic
- Order: Society of Jesus

Robert Charles Joseph Emile Jacquinot de Besange, SJ (pronounced [ʁɔbɛʁ ʒakino də bəzɑ̃ʒ]; 15 March 1878 – 10 September 1946), also known as Jacquinot de Besange and in China as Rao Jia-ju (Chinese: 饶家驹), was a French Jesuit who set up a successful model of safety zones that saved over half-a-million Chinese people during the Second Sino-Japanese War.

== History ==
Born in Saintes on 15 March 1878, Jacquinot de Besange's family originates from aristocratic lineages in Lorraine, in northeastern France. He arrived in China in 1913 as a missionary.

From 1914, he was a supervisor and teacher in St. Ignatius School. Later he taught English literature at the Aurora University. He also served the Portuguese congregation at the Church of the Sacred Heart of Jesus in Hongkou. He also served as a chaplain to the Shanghai Volunteer Corps. He had lost his right arm in an explosion while conducting chemistry experiments in his youth, and was known as the "one-armed priest."

De Besange acted as president of the China International Famine Relief Commission during the 1932 Battle of Shanghai, where his relief work for refugees, including negotiating short truce between the Chinese and the Japanese armies to allow the evacuation of civilians and casualties from the war zone, made him a household name in Shanghai.

The "de Besange model" began with the Shanghai Safety Zone (南市难民区, "Nanshi Refugee Zone"), or "Jacquinot de Besange Safe Zone", in 1937 during the Second Sino-Japanese War. It was a demilitarised zone for Chinese civilians located in a part of the Old City of Shanghai that was adjacent to the Shanghai French Concession. The demilitarised zone was respected by both sides of the war and by the concession authorities. It was administered by an international committee composed of representatives of the American, British, and French communities and policed by the Chinese police. The zone was credited with saving the lives of thousands of Chinese residents between 1937 and 1940, when it was abolished after de Besange left Shanghai. Aside from setting up the Safety Zone, de Besange was also responsible for arranging for refugee camps to be set up in the Tu-seh-weh Orphanage and the Fuh Tan College to shelter refugees fleeing the war zone.

Following the example of de Besange in Shanghai, the foreigners in Nanjing created the Nanking Safety Zone (南京安全区), managed by the International Committee for the Nanjing Safety Zone and led by the German businessman John Rabe. The same model also inspired the Hankou Safety Zone, the Zhangzhou Safety Zone, and the Shenzhen Safety Zone.

De Besange left China in 1940 and moved back to Europe.

In December 1945, he was appointed as the chief representative of the Holy See in Berlin. He died of leukemia on 10 September 1946.

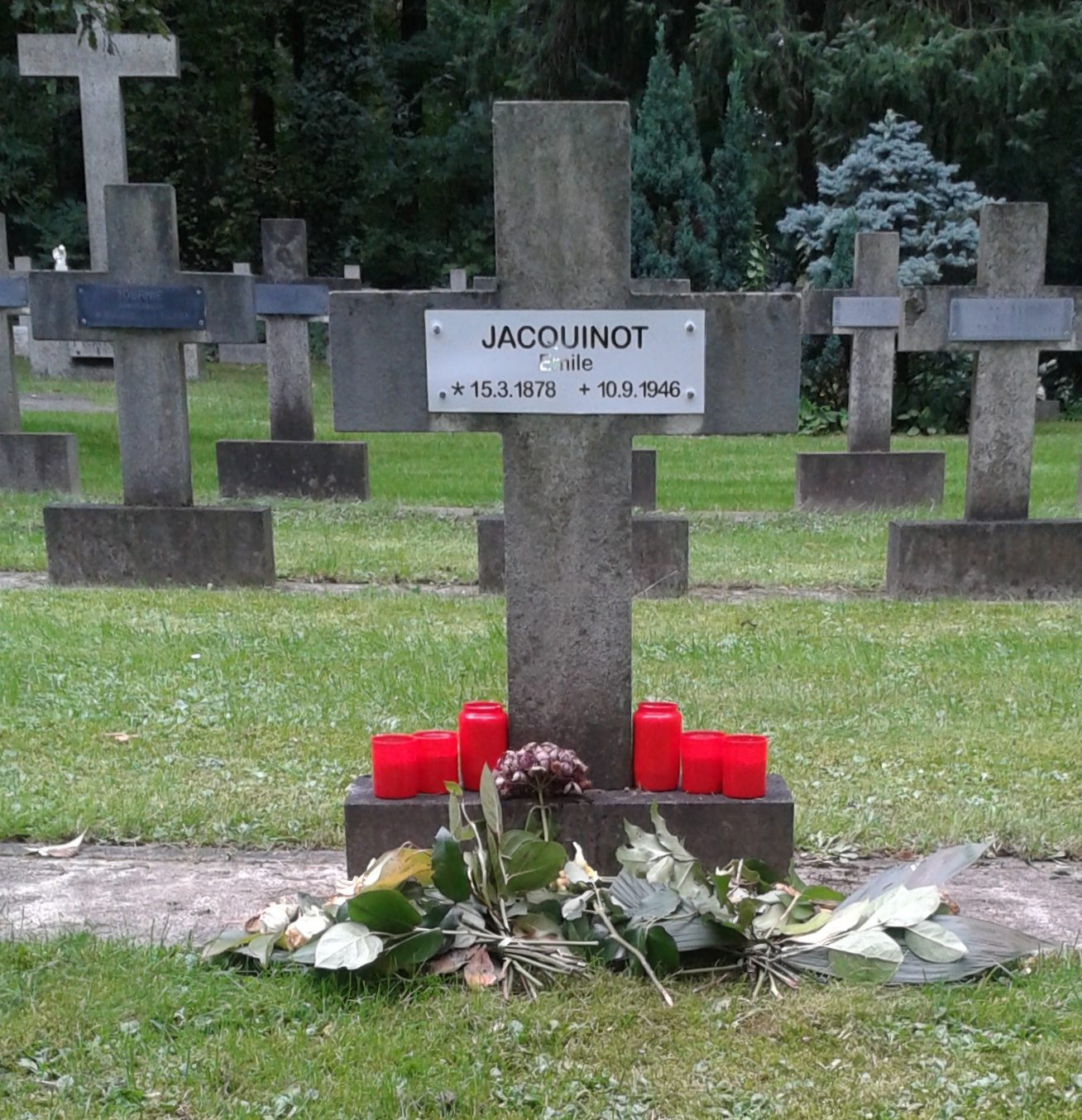
Grave of Robert Jacquinot de Besange

His work is acknowledged in the Protocols and Commentaries to the 1949 Geneva Convention. A film of his life and work, Jacquinot: A Forgotten Hero directed by Krzysztof Zanussi, was featured in the 2009 Shanghai International Film Festival.

On the occasion of the 80th anniversary of the events, a memorial stone was unveiled in the Shanghai City God Temple in December 2017.
