= The Song of Ariran (book) =

1941 book by Helen Foster Snow

- First edition cover
- Author: Helen Foster Snow
- Publication date: 1941
- ISBN: 0-87867-022-X

Song of Ariran (New York: John Day 1941) is a book of reportage by an American journalist, Helen Foster Snow under the name Nym Wales. Snow traveled to Yan'an, the wartime capital of the Chinese Communist Party, which welcomed and supported many Koreans in the fight for independence from Japan. The colorful and personal information on the history of the Korean independence movement and the Chinese Communist movement in the 1930s is based on extensive interviews with a Korean communist Jang Jirak (장지락) who is called Kim San (김산) in the book.

== Influences ==
The Korean translation of this book was published in South Korea in the 1984. During the period, pro-democracy social activism in the country had become radicalized with the military coup of 1979 and the massacre in Gwangju, a southwestern city of Korea, in 1980. College students and social activists including labor-movement activists were deeply influenced and radicalized by reading some books and pamphlets, and the Korean translation of this book was one key text among such ones in South Korea of the 1980s. The Korean translation was published in new paperback editions in 1993 and 2000 and in a new hardcover edition in 2005 by the same Korean publisher, and the book is still being read by Korean readers and inspires them as of the 2010s.
