= Kim San =

Korean revolutionary (1905–1938)

- 김산
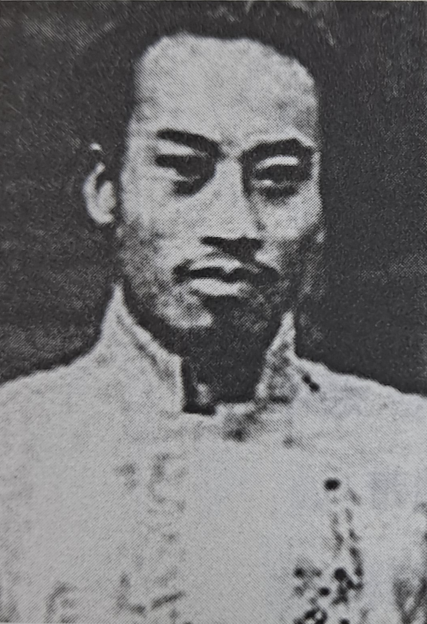
- Born: Jang Jihak; April 14, 1905; Yongcheon-gun, North Pyongan Province
- Died: October 19, 1938 (aged 33); Yan'an, Shaanxi, Chinese Soviet Republic
- Other name: Jang Jirak
- Military career
- Service: Heroic Corps (1919–1921); Red Army (1925–1930)

Kim San (Korean: 김산; Hanja: 金山; April 14, 1905 – October 19, 1938) was a socialist revolutionary and Korean independence fighter. His real name was known as Jang Jihak (장지학; 張志鶴) according to Nym Wales, or Jang Jirak (장지락; 張志樂) according to Japanese authorities' documents. Born in Korea in the early 20th century, witnessing and experiencing the oppression and miseries made by Japanese colonial authorities, he participated in the Korean Independence Movement and the Chinese Communist Revolution moving throughout such areas as Korea, Japan, Manchuria, Shanghai, Beijing and Guangdong. He was also fluent in many languages such as Japanese, Chinese, English and Esperanto. He was executed in China in 1938, but his life and activities were known by the 1941 publication of a book titled Song of Ariran written by journalist Nym Wales based on her interviews with him in Yan'an, China in 1937. That book was also translated in Japanese first in 1953 and in Korean first in 1984.

== Life ==
Kim San was born on April 14, 1905, in Ryongchon County, North Pyongan Province, Korean Empire. He was born into a poor farming family just before Japan's indirect rule over Korea. He attended primary and middle school there. When he was a little boy, he had a Christian family background. After witnessing and experiencing the tragic and cruel suppression by Japanese colonial authorities of Korean people's March Independent Movement in 1919 which he participated to and was imprisoned for three days, he decided to learn revolutionary theories to help expel the imperialists from his home country and to achieve national independence. He went to Tokyo, Japan which served at the time as a revolutionists safe haven after the WWI. As a student at Tokyo he met many people of different types and levels, and was an avid reader of diverse subjects. He concluded that the new theory to save Korea can be found in the Soviet Russia, and returned to Korea shortly en route to Russia. Then he went to Harbin on his way to Russia where he found the route was blocked at the border. He walked a 300 kilometers long way to be enrolled in the Shin Heung Military Academy which had been founded by Korean immigrants for the purpose of educating the Korean Independent Army leaders. After graduation, he went to Shanghai to work for the Korean Provisional Government. He briefly became an anarchist there to know members of the Heroic Corps. Since then, like many of his Korean contemporaries, he became a Socialist revolutionary not only with this experience of colonial agony, but also under the radicalizing influence of the Russian Revolution in 1917. Believing that the first step for the Korean liberation from Japan's rule would be the success of the communist revolution in mainland China and determined to actively participate in its progress, he went to Beijing, China in 1921. The next year he became a member of the Chinese Communist Party (CCP), and in 1923 became a member of the Communist Youth Alliance publishing a magazine titled Revolution. In 1925 he left Beijing to Guangdong and participated more actively in the Chinese Communist Revolution. He attended Whampoa Military Academy and was enrolled in the department of medicine and later in the political science at Sun Yat-sen University. In 1926, he became Associate Editor of magazine Revolutionary Alliance, which was published by the Youth Alliance for the Korean Revolution, and made an organization named the Alliance of the Eastern Nations. He participated in armed battles such as the Guangzhou Uprising in 1927 on the side of the Chinese Red Army risking his life several times. About 200 of about 7,000 communists who died in the Guangzhou Uprising are known to have been Korean communists.

While participating in revolutionary activities in Hong Kong, Shanghai and Beijing from 1928 through 1930, he was arrested by the Chinese police and turned over to the Japanese Consulate by the police because he was a Korean, then sent to Sinuiju, Korea and was very badly tortured and interrogated there for forty days by Japanese colonial authorities. Finding no solid evidence, they released him in April 1931. He went to Beijing to become a teacher at schools including a Teachers' College. Caught by the Chinese police again in April 1933, he escaped in January 1934. While working at the Northern Area Committee of the CCP, he was married to a Chinese woman and worked as a railway worker for a short time. His son was born in January 1937.

He founded the Alliance for the Liberation of the Korean People in Shanghai in July 1936, and became a representative of Korean revolutionaries in the organization in August 1936. He also lectured Chinese Red Army members physics, chemistry, mathematics, Korean and Japanese courses at the Military and Political Academy for Fighting against Japan in Yan'an, China in 1937.

American journalist Nym Wales, who was then Edgar Snow's wife, met him as she was curious of him because she learnt that many of the books written in English that she wanted to borrow from Lu Xun Library has been already borrowed by him, and interviewed him more than 22 times for three months from June to August 1937 at the library in Yan'an, while interviewing key Chinese revolutionaries including Mao Zedong.

However, he was framed and labelled into a "Trotskyist and Japan's spy" and arrested by the Chinese Communist Security led by Kang Sheng, a leader of the organization who was under the influence of Stalinism at that time and led the Cultural Revolution with Jiang Qing later, and executed in 1938. He was reinstated by the Central Committee of the Chinese Communist Party in January 1983 after his son had requested the recovery of his father's honor in 1978.

He was posthumously awarded the Order of Merit for National Foundation by the South Korean government in 2005, since the anti-communist denial of recognizing the historical contributions of those, who had been fighters for Korean Independence on the leftist side during the Japanese rule, was loosened after democratization in South Korea.
