= Alan Priest =

American art historian (1898–1969)

Alan Reed Priest (31 January 1898 – 21 January 1969) was an American art historian, specialising in the arts of China and Japan. He was curator of Far Eastern Art at the Metropolitan Museum of Art, New York, from c. 1928 to 1965.

== Biography ==
Priest was born in Fitchburg, Worcester County, Massachusetts, one of three sons of General George Herbert Priest and Marion Louise Works Priest. He was educated at Fitchburg High School and Harvard University.

He spent some time in China in the 1920s, where he met John Alexander Pope, who would become a noted art historian. Priest became curator of Far Eastern Art at the Metropolitan Museum of Art, c. 1928–1965. During the 1930s, Priest looted reliefs from the Longmen Grottoes in Luoyang, aided by Chinese art dealer Yue Bin; the damaged pieces have since undergone several restoration projects. His curatorial work is discussed by James Cahill and Warren I Cohen. After retiring, he went to live in Kyoto, where he died and where his remains were buried.

== Publications ==
Books

- 1931 – The Metropolitan Museum of Art: Chinese Textiles, and introduction to the study of their history, sources.
- 1934 – Chinese Textiles: an introduction to the study of their history, sources, technique, symbolism and use – new and revised edition, with Pauline Simmons.
- 1938 – Chinese Bronzes of the Shang (1766-1122 BC) through the T’ang dynasty (AD 618-906): an exhibition lent by American collectors and museums and shown in gallery D6 from October 19 through November 27 (New York: Metropolitan Museum of Art)
- 1940 – Chinese Jewelry: a picture book (New York: The Museum Press)
- 1940 – Chinese Paintings: a picture book (New York: Metropolitan Museum of Art)
- 1941 – Japanese Illustrated Books (New York: The Museum Press)
- 1942 – Portraits of the Court of China (New York: Metropolitan Museum of Art)
- 1943 – An Exhibition of Modern Chinese Paintings (New York: Metropolitan Museum of Art)
- 1944 – Chinese Sculpture in the Metropolitan Museum of Art (New York: Metropolitan Museum of Art)
- 1945 – Costumes from the Forbidden City: a special exhibition opening March 6th (New York: Metropolitan Museum of Art)
- 1952 – Japanese Prints in the Metropolitan (New York: Metropolitan Museum of Art)
- 1954 – Aspects of Chinese Painting (New York: The Macmillan Company)
- 1967 – The Sculpture of Joseph Coletti (London: Macmillan / New York: Collier-Macmillan)
- 1974 – Costumes from the Forbidden City (New York: Arno Press)
- 1974 – Chinese Sculpture in the Metropolitan Museum of Art (New York: Arno Press)
- 1978 – Chinese Textiles: an introduction to the study of their history, sources, technique, symbolism and use (New York: Metropolitan Museum of Art) – new and revised edition, with Pauline Simmons
- n.d. – Catalogue of an exhibition of imperial robes and textiles of the Chinese Court (Minneapolis Institute of Arts)

Articles

- 1930 – A Chinese Stele, The Metropolitan Museum of Art Bulletin 25.
- 1930 – A Pair of Chinese Stone Animals, The Metropolitan Museum of Art Bulletin 30.
- 1930 – An Addition to the H.O. Havemeyer Collection, The Metropolitan Museum of Art Bulletin 25 (with Leslie Richardson).
- 1931 – Two Chinese Paintings, The Metropolitan Museum of Art Bulletin 26.
- 1931 – The Exhibition of Chinese Court Robes and Accessories, The Metropolitan Museum of Art Bulletin 26.
- 1932 – A Painting from Chinese Turkestan, The Metropolitan Museum of Art Bulletin 27.
- 1933 – Acquisitions of Far Eastern Art, The Metropolitan Museum of Art Bulletin 28 (with Pauline Simmons).
- 1933 – Ars Asiatica – Peintures Chinoises et Japonaises de la Collection Ulrich Odin, American Journal of Archaeology 37.
- 1934 – A Dated Chinese Wood Figure, The Metropolitan Museum of Art Bulletin 29.
- 1935 – Japanese Costume: No Robes and Buddhist Vestments, The Metropolitan Museum of Art Bulletin 30.
- 1935 – A Chinese Boddhisattva, The Metropolitan Museum of Art Bulletin 30.
- 1935 – Three Chinese Ivories, The Metropolitan Museum of Art Bulletin 30.
- 1936 – The Nine Old Men of Hsiang-shan, The Metropolitan Museum of Art Bulletin 31.
- 1936 – Chinese Textiles. Recent Accessions: The Hammond Robes and Others, The Metropolitan Museum of Art Bulletin 31.
- 1936 – Two Important Bronzes in the London Exhibition, Parnassus 8.
- 1939 – The Palaces of Ch’in, The Metropolitan Museum of Art Bulletin 34.
- 1939 – Two Buddhist Altarpieces of the Wei Dynasty, The Metropolitan Museum of Art Bulletin 34.
- 1940 – A Sung Vase, The Metropolitan Museum of Art Bulletin 35.
- 1940 – Notes, The Metropolitan Museum of Art Bulletin 35.
- 1941 – Ch’ien Lung and George III, The Metropolitan Museum of Art Bulletin 36.
- 1942 – Chinese Landscape in Miniature, The Metropolitan Museum of Art Bulletin 1.
- 1943 – Monkey, Wu Ch’eng-en, Arthur Waley, Far Eastern Survey 12.
- 1943 – Prepare for Emperors, The Metropolitan Museum of Art Bulletin 2.
- 1943 – Unnatural History, The Metropolitan Museum of Art Bulletin 1.
- 1946 – Mr Thurber's Chinese Dog, The Metropolitan Museum of Art Bulletin 4.
- 1946 – The Mansfield Collection of Japanese Prints, The Metropolitan Museum of Art Bulletin 5.
- 1947 – River: For an Elder Brother, The Metropolitan Museum of Art Bulletin 5.
- 1948 – Principles of Chinese Painting – George Rowley, Far Eastern Survey 17.
- 1948 – Notes, The Metropolitan Museum of Art Bulletin 6.
- 1948 – Birds, II, The Metropolitan Museum of Art Bulletin 6.
- 1949 – Medieval Indian Sculpture, The Metropolitan Museum of Art Bulletin 8.
- 1950 – Southern Sung Landscapes: The Horizontal Scrolls, The Metropolitan Museum of Art Bulletin 8.
- 1951 – Landscapes: Green and Blue, The Metropolitan Museum of Art Bulletin 9.
- 1953 – A Note on Japanese Painting, The Metropolitan Museum of Art Bulletin 11.
- 1953 – An Exhibition of Japanese Painting and Sculpture, Artibus Asiae 16.
- 1955 – Korin and the Iris Screens, The Metropolitan Museum of Art Bulletin 13.
- 1958 – The Korean Government Exhibition, The Metropolitan Museum of Art Bulletin 16.
- 1958 – Autumn Millet, The Metropolitan Museum of Art Bulletin 17.
- 1959 – An Aristocracy of Robes, The Metropolitan Museum of Art Bulletin 18.
- 1967 – Picnic on the Mountain, Arts in Virginia VII, Virginia Museum of Fine Arts.

== See also ==
• Georgia O'Keeffe Letters to Alan Priest, 1950–1961. Yale Collection of American Literature, Beinecke Rare Book and Manuscript Library.
