= George Eumorfopoulos =

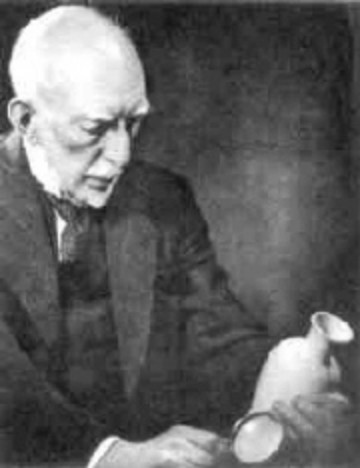
George Eumorfopoulos c. 1930

George Aristides Eumorfopoulos (18 April 1863 Liverpool – 19 December 1939 Chelsea Embankment), was a British collector of Chinese, Korean and Near Eastern art.

== Life ==
Eumorfopoulos was born at 43 Bedford Street South, Mount Pleasant, Merseyside, the son of Aristides Georges Eumorfopoulos (1825–1897) and Mariora Eustratius Scaramanga (1840–1908). His grandparents had fled the Greek island of Chios during the massacre of its population by the Ottoman army in 1822.

== Career ==
Eumorfopoulos worked for a London firm established in 1819 - Ralli Brothers, of Greek origin, a firm of private bankers who were also importers of rape, rice, cotton and hemp from India. By the time he retired in August 1934 he had risen to the position of Vice President of the firm. Since 1922 he lived at 7 Chelsea Embankment in London, a townhouse he had converted into a museum. Eumorfopoulos was a respected Orientalist. In the early stages of his collecting activity he focused on European medieval and renaissance art and 18th century ceramics alongside Japanese art, but he soon diversified into early Chinese art, especially after 1906. He not only made use of the services of experts or agents, but also relied on his own rapidly growing experience in acquiring objects. His collection of Oriental art grew to an enormous size, obliging him to add a two-storey extension to the back of his Chelsea house. He was one of the founders of the Oriental Ceramic Society and was its first president from 1921 until his death in 1939. He organised and funded the publication of eleven volumes illustrating and describing items from his collection during the 1920s and early 1930s. Free access to his collection and encouragement from him inspired his neighbours Nell and Charles Vyse to experiment with Oriental stoneware glazes.

== Collection ==
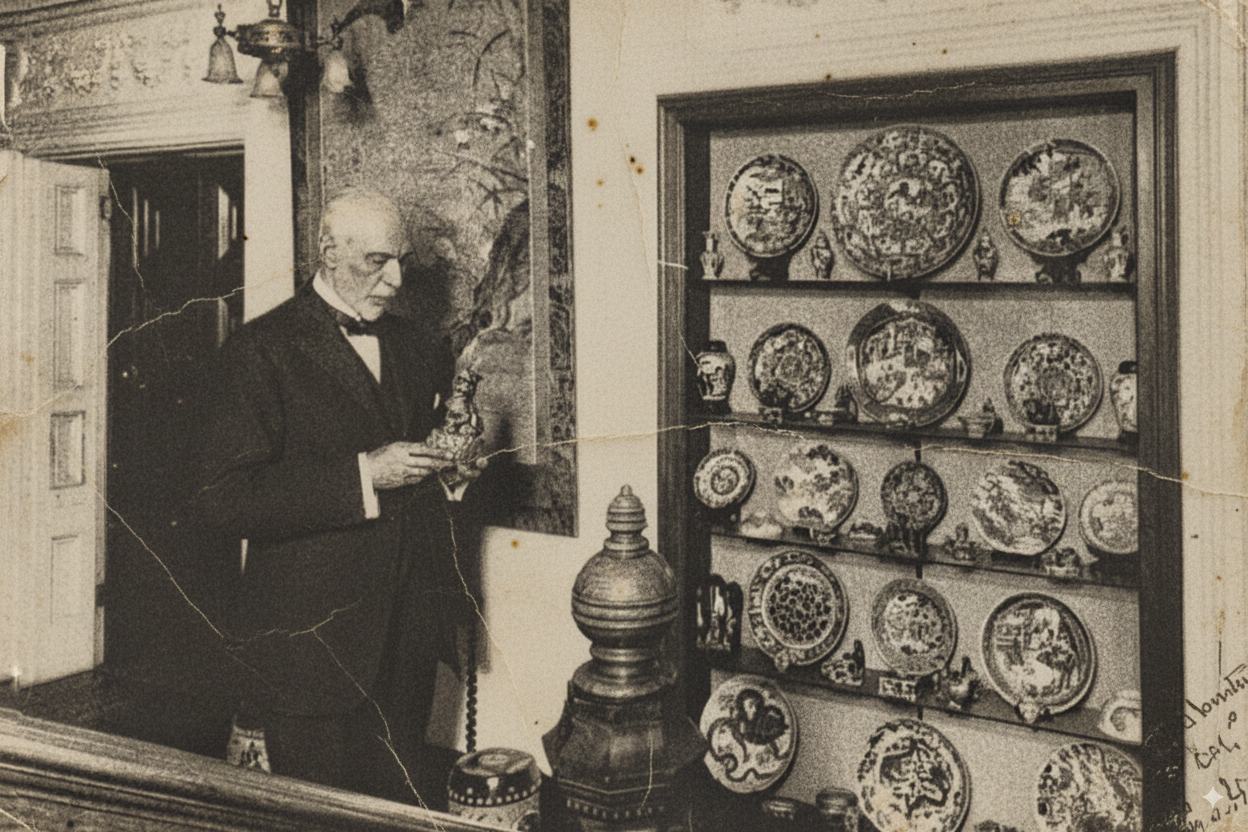
George Eumorfopoulos in his home, standing beside a display of Chinese ceramics.

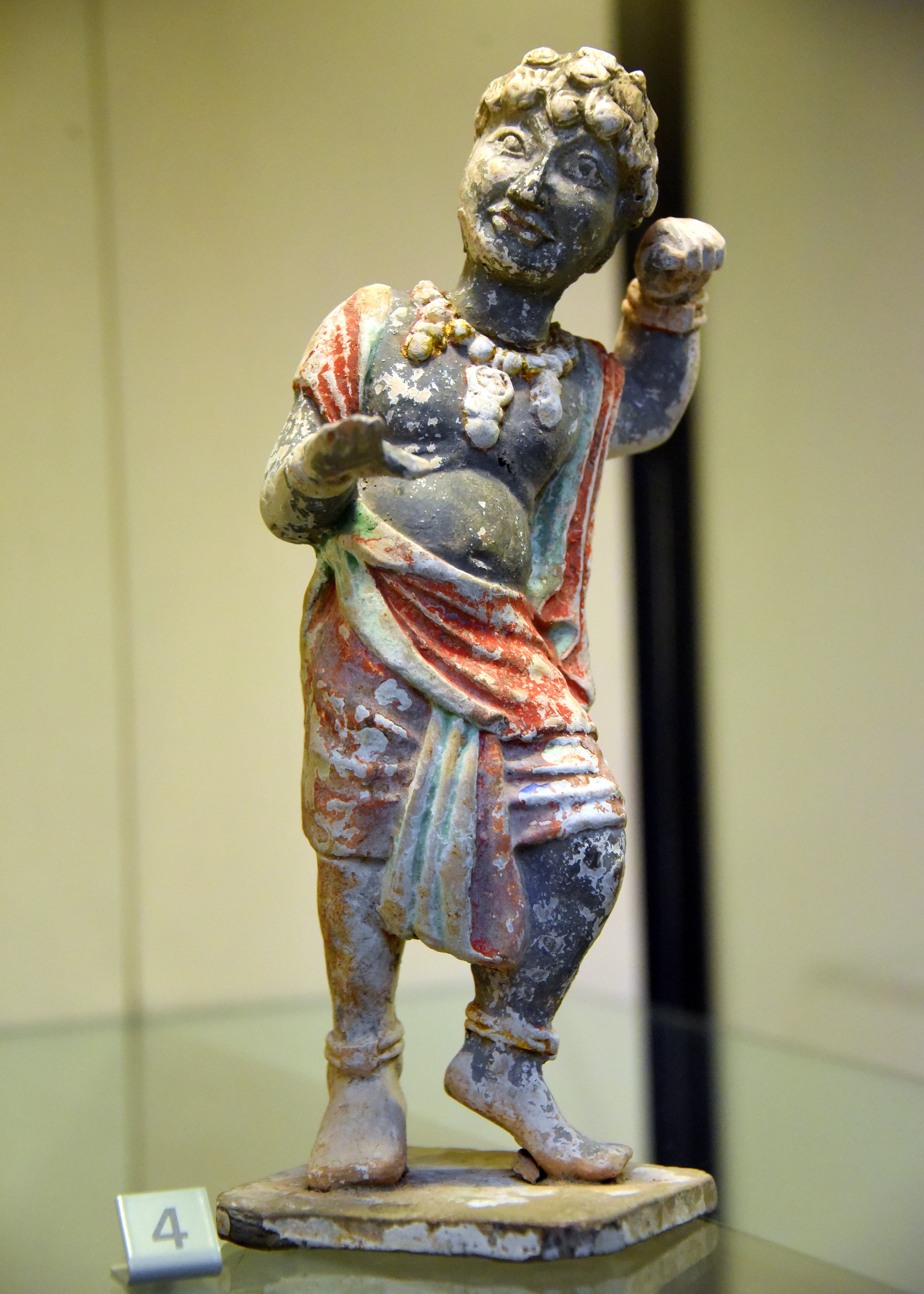
Figurine. Dancing boy. Painted earthenware with gilding. Tang Dynasty, 680-750 CE. From the Eumorfopoulos Collection. Victoria and Albert Museum, London

Eumorfopoulos had intended to bequeath his collection to the British nation, but the Great Depression of the 1930s forced him to sell part of it, in what was called "a princely gesture", to the Victoria & Albert and British Museums for £100 000 in 1934/5; he also sold some duplicates through Bluett's, the London art dealers, and between 1927 and 1936 donated 800 pieces to the Benaki Museum, Athens. In 1936 the Royal Academy's Burlington House arranged an international exhibition of Chinese art, to which end George Eumorfopoulos served on the organising committee and visited China to help select treasures from the Forbidden City, on loan from the Nationalist Government. In his memoirs, Eumorfopoulos also lamented the heart-wrenching loss of cultural artifacts amid the political turmoil he witnessed during his travels in China. He donated or sold portions of his collection at reduced prices to patriotic Chinese merchants dedicated to preserving the nation’s cultural heritage, and repeatedly highlighted the invaluable assistance he received from a Cantonese merchant surnamed Teng.

After his death, his personal library found its way to the Courtauld Institute of Art and eventually to the School of Oriental and African Studies at the University of London. He was buried in the Greek Orthodox Necropolis at West Norwood Cemetery

He was married to Julia Scaramanga (born 26 June 1864 in London, died 12 January 1944 at Crawley Down, Sussex). She was the daughter of George Emmanuel Scaramanga (1825–1897) and Elizabeth "Eliza" Franghiadi (1843–1933).

== See also ==
- Robert Lockhart Hobson

== Bibliography ==
- Robert L. Hobson et al., The George Eumorfopoulos Collection (11 vols), London, Ernest Benn Ltd. 1925–1932.
- Judith Green, "'A New Orientation of Ideas': Collecting and the Taste for Early Chinese Ceramics in England: 1921–36", in Stacey Pierson (editor), Collecting Chinese Art: Interpretation and Display, Colloquies on Art and Archaeology in Asia No. 20, Percival David Foundation of Chinese Art, London 2000, 43–56.
- George Manginis, "The George Eumorfopoulos donation to the Benaki Museum in Athens", Transactions of the Oriental Ceramic Society 66, 2001–2002, 77–93.
- George Manginis, "A collection of Chinese ceramics at the Benaki Museum", Mouseio Benaki 7, 2007, 197–207.
