= John Alexander Pope =

American art historian

John Alexander Pope (4 August 1906 – 18 September 1982) was a prominent scholar of Asian art, particularly Chinese and Japanese blue-and-white ceramics. He spent most of his career at the Freer Gallery of Art in Washington.

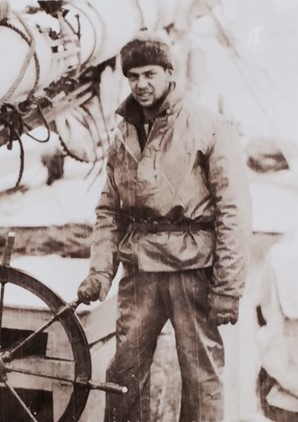
John Alexander Pope

Pope was born in Detroit, Michigan. He attended Phillips Exeter Academy until 1925, and then Yale College, where he attained a bachelor's degree in English literature 1930. Before graduation he was active in the China International Famine Relief Commission. While serving in the commission, he was sent to the Yellow River valley where he surveyed famine conditions. This allowed him to see China firsthand and also to meet Alan Priest, who would later become the curator of Far Eastern ceramics at the Metropolitan Museum of Art. Pope later attributed meeting Priest in Beijing as the most influential factor in determining his eventual, life-long field of study of blue-and-white Asian porcelains.

Returning to the United States in 1930, he worked for two years at the Chase National Bank in New York. In 1932 he began work in Chinese studies at Harvard University leading to master's and doctoral degrees. Pope pursued graduate studies at Harvard where he studied the history, archaeology, and languages of China and Japan. In 1938 he studied for one term at the Courtauld Institute in London and in 1942 lectured on Chinese art at Columbia University. He was awarded his master's degree in 1940 and PhD in 1955. Pope took a leave from his studies in 1945 through 1946 to serve in the Marine Corps Reserve. With the rank of captain, he served with Corps in China as a Chinese language translator.

Pope joined the Freer in 1943 and worked as an associate in research. From 1946 he was hired as the assistant director and served in that position until 1962, when he became the museum's director. Pope's deep interest in the Asian porcelains ceramics prompted him to establish criteria and a methodology for stylistic and dating analysis of 14th and 15th blue-and-white porcelains.

Beginning in the 1960s, Pope took many trips to Japan, which resulted in his research slowly shifting to the study of Japanese ceramics.

Pope retired in 1971 while continuing at the Freer as the director emeritus of research coordinator for Far Eastern ceramics.

He married Annemarie (Henle) Pope (Dortmund 1907–2001 Washington) in 1947.

A bibliography of his publications appeared in the Archives of Asian Art 36 (1983).

== See also ==
- Ming presentation porcelain
- Chinese ceramics
- Smithsonian Institution
