= Albert Denison (Royal Navy officer) =

Royal Navy rear-admiral

Rear-Admiral The Honourable Albert Denison

Personal details
- Born: 4 October 1835
- Died: 2 September 1903 (aged 67)
- Awards: Second China War Medal

Rear-Admiral Albert Denison Somerville Denison (4 October 1835 – 2 September 1903) was an officer in the British Royal Navy who served in China during the Second Opium War and received a medal for his service.

== Early life ==
Albert Denison was born on 4 October 1835, the second son of Albert Denison, 1st Baron Londesborough, and the Hon. Henrietta Weld-Forester (a daughter of the 1st Baron Forester). He had a brother, Harold Albert Denison.

== Family ==
In 1873 he married Louisa Fanny Crichlow Fabris. His daughter, the Honourable Daisy Denison, married Robert Lockhart Hobson of the British Museum in 1900. In 1938, Daisy was granted the title of a baron's daughter, which would have been hers had her father survived to succeed as Lord Londesborough. She died in 1967. He had two other daughters, Ivy, who married Herbert Guy Sturges Mitchison, and Lily, who married Reginald Marsh Everett. Both were also declared Honourable on the same basis as Daisy. After the most senior line to the Londesborough barony failed, his son Ernest succeeded to the title in 1937.

== Career ==
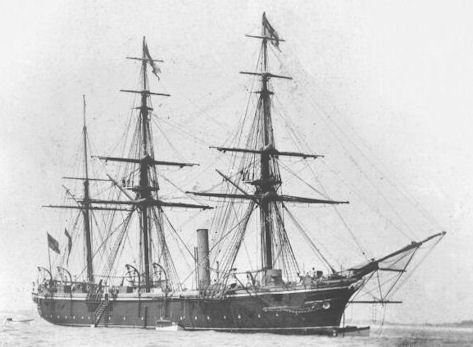
HMS Cormorant

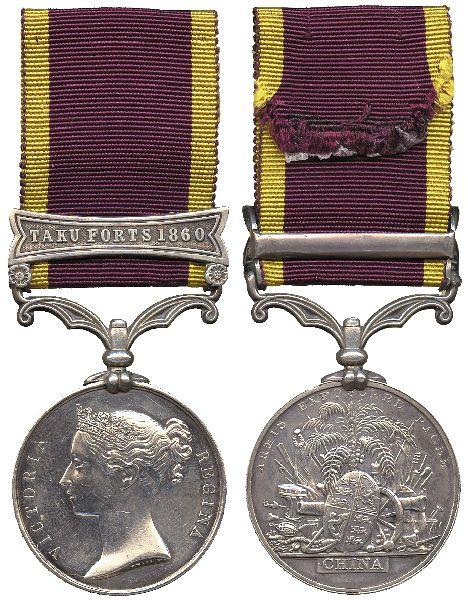
The second China War Medal with Taku Forts 1860 clasp (not necessarily the same clasp awarded to Denison)

Denison joined the Royal Navy in 1849. He was appointed mate with a pass in seamanship in 1856. He was mate and subsequently acting lieutenant on the sloop HMS Hornet 1856–59 when she served off China in the Second Opium War, being promoted to acting lieutenant in 1857 in consideration of successful operations against "Mandarin junks" in the Canton River and the attack on the fort and junk fleet at Fatsham Creek. He received the second China War Medal and clasp.

He was promoted to commander in 1866. In 1869 he was commander of HMS Cormorant at the China station and in 1873 he was promoted to captain. He was placed on the retired list with the rank of captain in 1881 and subsequently promoted to the rank of rear admiral.

== Death ==
Denison died on 2 September 1903. His residence at the time of his death was "Woodside", Wootton, Isle of Wight. Probate was granted in London to his brother Harold Albert Denison and Gerald Otho Fitzgerald on an estate of £14,085.

== See also ==
- Cormorant-class gunvessel
