= Clarks Mills, Pennsylvania =

Unincorporated community in Pennsylvania, US

- Unincorporated community
- Location within Pennsylvania
- Coordinates: 41°23′35″N 80°11′01″W
- Country: United States
- State: Pennsylvania
- County: Mercer
- Elevation: 1,165 ft (355 m)
- Time zone: UTC-5 (Eastern (EST))
  - Summer (DST): UTC-4 (EDT)
- ZIP code: 16114
- Area codes: 724, 878
- GNIS feature ID: 1199848

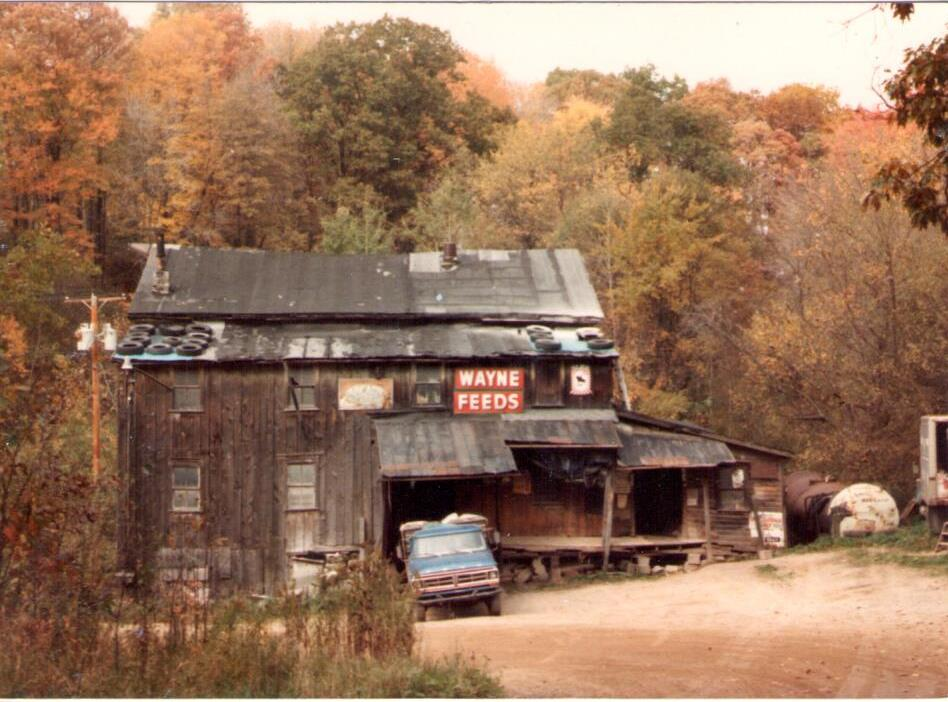

Clarks Mills is an unincorporated community in Mercer County, Pennsylvania, United States. The community is located along Pennsylvania Route 358, 11.9 miles (19.2 km) north-northeast of Mercer. Clarks Mills has a post office, with ZIP code 16114.
