= Gung ho =

Term or catch phrase meaning extremely enthusiastic

Gung ho (/ɡʌŋˈhoʊ/) is an English term with the current meaning of "enthusiastic or energetic", especially overly so. It originated among World War II-era US Marines, who borrowed it from the Chinese 工合 (pinyin: gōnghé), understood by them as a slogan meaning "work together". The Chinese term in fact denotes a kind of labor organization, being an abbreviation of 工業合作社 (pinyin: gōngyè hézuòshè), literally "industrial cooperative".

== Overview ==
The linguist Albert Moe concluded that the term is an "Americanism that is derived from the Chinese, but its several accepted American meanings have no resemblance whatsoever to the recognized meaning in the original language", and that its "various linguistic uses, as they have developed in the United States, have been peculiar to American speech". In Chinese, concludes Moe, "this is neither a slogan nor a battle cry; it is only a name for an organization".

The term was coined and promoted by United States Marine Corps Major Evans Carlson. Carlson explained in a 1943 interview: "I was trying to build up the same sort of working spirit I had seen in China where all the soldiers [of the Eighth Route Army] dedicated themselves to one idea and worked together to put that idea over. I told the boys about it again and again. I told them of the motto of the Chinese Cooperatives, Gung Ho. It means Work Together — Work in Harmony."

Carlson used gung ho as a motto during his unconventional command of the 2nd Marine Raider Battalion, leading to other marines adopting the term to mean overly enthusiastic. From there, it spread throughout the U.S. Marine Corps, where it was used as an expression of spirit, and then into American society as a whole when the term was the title of a 1943 war film, Gung Ho!, about the 2nd Raider Battalion's raid on Makin Island in 1942.

== See also ==
- History of the cooperative movement in China
- Chinese Industrial Cooperatives
- List of English words of Chinese origin
- List of United States Marine Corps acronyms and expressions
