= China International Famine Relief Commission =

The China International Famine Relief Commission (CIFRC) was an organization dedicated to famine relief efforts in early 20th century China. The organization was founded on November 16, 1921.

== See also ==
- Chinese famine of 1920–1921
- Robert Jacquinot de Besange
- John Alexander Pope
