= Helen Foster Snow =

American journalist (1907–1997)

- Born: Helen Foster; September 21, 1907; Cedar City, Utah, U.S.
- Died: January 11, 1997 (aged 89); Madison, Connecticut, U.S.
- Resting place: North Madison West Side Cemetery
- Other name: Nym Wales
- Education: University of Utah
- Occupations: Journalist; Author
- Known for: Journalism; Co-founder of Chinese Industrial Cooperatives
- Spouse: Edgar Snow (m. 1932; div. 1949)

Helen Foster Snow (September 21, 1907 – January 11, 1997) was an American journalist who reported from China in the 1930s under the name Nym Wales on the developing Chinese Civil War, the Korean independence movement and the Second Sino-Japanese War.

Snow's family moved often throughout her youth and she ended up living in Salt Lake City with her grandmother in her teenage years, until she decided to move to China in 1931. There, she married American journalist Edgar Snow and became a correspondent for several publications. While she and her husband were sympathetic to the revolutionaries in China, whom she compared favorably to the Nationalists under Chiang Kai-shek, she was never a card-carrying Communist.

While living in Beijing, the Snows befriended leftist leaders of the 1935 December 9th Movement, who arranged for first Edgar, then Helen to visit the communist wartime capital, Yan'an, in 1937, where she interviewed Chinese Communist leaders, including Mao Zedong. The Snows also conceptualized the Chinese Industrial Cooperatives, known as the Gung-Ho movement, which provided jobs and stability. In 1940, Snow returned to the United States, where she and Edgar divorced. She continued to support the Cooperatives and write books based on her experiences in China. In the late 1940s, critics grouped her with the China Hands as one of those responsible for the "loss of China" who went beyond sympathy to active support of Mao's revolution.

== Early life ==
Helen Foster was born in Cedar City, Utah, and raised as a member of the Church of Jesus Christ of Latter-day Saints (LDS Church). She was born to John Moody Foster and Hannah Davis, who met working as teachers at Ricks Academy, a school affiliated with the LDS Church. Hannah graduated from Ricks Academy, and John was a graduate from Stanford University. Both of Helen's parents were descendants of Mormon pioneers who migrated to Utah in the mid-1800s.

From the time Helen was young, the Foster family moved quite frequently. After Helen's birth in Cedar City, the Fosters moved to Chicago so John could attend law school. Several years later, the family once again moved to Idaho. The frequent moves helped to shape Helen's outgoing personality as she was constantly concerned about what her new peers would think of her. Being the oldest child and only daughter of the family, she took on a lot of responsibility as the family expanded. She often worked alongside her mother to care for her three younger brothers and complete chores, especially when financial circumstances were difficult for the Fosters.

Upon entering high school, Helen moved to Salt Lake City to live with her grandmother and aunt. She attended West High School and became involved in many school activities and organizations. She frequently worked on editing the school's yearbook and was elected student vice president of her senior class. Due to her father's influence, Helen wanted to attend college at Stanford, but the cost of tuition was prohibitive. According to Helen, her parents believed that "girls were not considered a good investment in higher education as they would only get married, while boys were worth it". However, Helen's father agreed to pay for her attendance at the University of Utah. She attended school for several years, but did not graduate.

Instead, Helen focused on work and was hired as a secretary for the Utah chapter of the American Silver Mining Commission. While at this position, she decided she would like to work abroad in addition to her aspiration to write her own "great American novel". Helen took the civil service exam and passed, yet there were no open positions in Europe, where she initially desired to go. However, her employer had a connection in China, ultimately securing a job for Helen with the president of an American company in Shanghai. In August 1931, Helen set sail to Asia in the hopes of becoming a writer.

== Life in China ==
=== Arrival ===
Almost immediately after arriving in 1931, she met Edgar Snow, who had arrived in China in 1929. Edgar was ready to return to America at this point as his mother had died and he was battling malaria. But meeting Helen convinced him to stay working in China. She admired his work and had collected clippings of the newspaper articles he had written. Helen wanted her career to emulate his.

Less than one week after Helen's arrival, the Yangtze flood caused extreme damage around Shanghai. Helen was working as a foreign correspondent for the Seattle Star through the Scripps-Canfield League, a newspaper publishing company, and was to provide images "glorifying the glamorous Orient". The flood of the Yangtze was the worst in recorded history, displacing 120,000 people. Over a period of three weeks, continuous floods killed over 600,000 and destroyed 12 million homes.

Several months later, on January 28, 1932, Japanese forces invaded Shanghai. Helen was in the battle area and observed the invasion from the tower at her apartment. Edgar was also in the midst of the battle. Because of his foreigner status, he was able to observe the action up close with a lesser amount of risk. Helen too wanted to experience battle in-person and take better pictures of the war. Edgar helped her to get a press card, and Helen soon became a war correspondent herself.

Helen had only planned to stay in China for a year. However, over the next year, a courtship blossomed between Helen and Edgar. In a letter from the winter of 1932, Helen wrote, "I like him better than anyone else I have ever known". Edgar proposed to Helen on her 25th birthday, but she declined his offer. She didn't want their marriage to suffer because of her "author psychology" as she was working on a book. Several months later, Ed proposed once again and Helen accepted. The couple married on Christmas Day in 1932. The Snows remained in China for nearly a decade.

=== December 9 Student Movement ===
At a time when many Chinese were impatient with the Nationalist government for not opposing the Japanese more actively, the couple moved to Beiping, as Beijing was then called, and took up residence in a small house near Yenching University, where Edgar taught journalism. Helen enrolled in courses at the university. The couple benefited from extraterritorial status as foreigners in China, so they were exempt from Chinese law. With this privilege, the Snows were able to assist students in protesting fascism and contribute to the student movement. Helen once observed, "We couldn't have done anything if we'd been under Chinese law. A Chinese would have been executed for even messing with such things as we did". The Snows served as a source of information for the students, providing them with information that was generally censored by the government. While the Snows never joined the Communist party, they sympathized with Chinese students who desired to resist the Japanese.

In 1935, Helen played a large role in orchestrating the anti-Japanese December 9th Movement at Yenching after the attack on Manchuria. Between 800 and 3000 students are estimated to have marched in the streets on the night of December 9. Helen not only directed the demonstration, but she also reported on it. This particular protest inspired the organization of 65 other demonstrations in 32 cities across China. One week later, on December 16, an even larger demonstration took place. Nearly 10,000 students from 28 schools participated in this protest. The Snows got to know idealistic and patriotic students, a number of whom were in their journalism classes, and some of whom were members of the Communist underground and would eventually become leaders of the Chinese Communist Party. Edgar and Helen opened their home to student activists during this time as a safe place to develop plans of the student movement and Communist Party.

The couple helped translate Living China, a collection of stories that served as a modern left-wing literary work. Helen also produced and dispersed anti-fascist documents to students. In addition, the Snows produced a magazine in 1937 called Democracy, which was intended to spread Christian ethics. Edgar was intended to be the driving force behind the magazine, however, Helen took charge as her husband worked on his book. The Snows had an agreement that Helen would do all the work for the publication and Edgar would put his name on it as editor. However, the magazine's production came to an end when the Japanese invaded and seized copies from the presses that same year.

=== Caves of Yan'an and Mao Zedong ===
Edgar was the first to go to the "Red Areas" and came back with the material for his Red Star Over China. Helen, or "Peg", as she was known to her friends, was not to be outdone, and soon followed. In April 1937, Helen made a trip to the Communist headquarters in Yan'an. Her trip was much longer than anticipated as the Japanese occupied Northern China beginning in July of that same year and bad weather conditions made it impossible to travel. In Yan'an, Helen was only the second foreign woman to enter the area, and the eighth foreign journalist to have such access. She interviewed Mao Zedong and also got his support for what would become the Chinese Industrial Cooperatives.

According to Yu Jianting, Helen's translator, Mao explained the history of the Red Army for the first time to Helen despite Edgar's multiple interviews with him the previous year. Chinese Communist leaders had not shared the history of the party previously as they wanted to be seen as equals within the community rather than "heroes of the people". Mao provided Helen with a letter introducing her as a war correspondent, which would give her access to otherwise restricted areas. Mao also requested that Helen share the Chinese Communist Party's "Ten Guiding Principles to Resist against Japan and Save the Nation" on an international scale. Helen's work with Mao gave her the opportunity to interview other important Communist Party figures in Yan'an, which would become the basis for her book.

Helen also interviewed Kang Keqing, wife of the future head of state Zhu De. Kang informed Helen of several issues the army were facing, including lack of soldiers and weaponry. Helen maintained a friendship with Kang and the two exchanged letters for many years after Helen left China.

While in Yan'an, Helen developed severe dysentery and became extremely ill. Despite her illness, Helen completed her book's manuscript in less than one year. Inside Red China was the first book ever written that focused on the city of Yan'an and became important literature to students all over China. This book was supposed to be a companion work to Edgar's Red Star Over China, but it never received the acclaim that Edgar's work had. This specific trip to Yan'an provided Helen with the material to produce at least five other books. Helen used experiences from this trip to write her most successful book, The Song of Ariran. She also drew upon her interviews with Kim San, Korean independence activist she met in Yan'an.

=== Chinese Industrial Cooperatives and the Gung-Ho movement ===
In 1937, Japan attacked China, destroying or gaining control over 90% of the country's modern industries. The couple joined anti-Japanese friends, such as Ida Pruitt, Israel Epstein, and Rewi Alley in organizing Chinese Industrial Cooperatives' Gung-Ho industrial worker's cooperatives after 1937. Helen envisioned the concept for Indusco from the beginning. The purpose for the industrial cooperatives was to create jobs and income so the Chinese people could wield economic power against Japan. The system was to be run by its own members. "Gung-ho" is Chinese for "work together", which represents all peoples working together in cooperation. The Nationalist Chinese Government under Chiang Kai-shek was willing to provide funding for the cooperatives and that support would continue under Mao Zedong.

In 1938, the first booklet titled Chinese Industrial Cooperatives was published. The first Committee for the Promotion of Industrial Cooperatives in China was formed on April 3, 1938. Helen used her writing position with certain publications to create support and financial backing in America for the Chinese Cooperatives. In addition, the Snows became good friends with Colonel Evans Carlson, who had a connection to President Franklin D. Roosevelt. Helen believed Roosevelt would support the cooperatives in accordance with his New Deal policy. Eventually, Eleanor Roosevelt became a member of the American Board of Sponsors for the Cooperatives. Overall, the Cooperatives received funds from Americans as well as Chinese citizens in the Philippines.

After the Chinese Industrial Cooperatives' first year in existence, 1,284 industrial cooperatives were functioning with 15,625 members. By 1940, the numbers in membership nearly doubled. With notoriety building around the cooperatives, Helen took it upon herself to publish a book on Indusco for an American audience. In 1941, she wrote and published China Builds for Democracy. The book not only created publicity, but also accumulated support for the Cooperatives in the United States.

By June 1941, the Indusco system had reached its highest numbers, with 1,867 cooperatives with 29,284 registered members. However, by the end of World War II, the Indusco model was not as powerful as it once was in China. In December 1945, only 335 Indusco cooperatives with 4,889 registered members were reported. While Indusco declined in China, the model spread to other nations, including India, Burma, and Japan. Helen continued to promote the Indusco model as she remained a member and vice chairman of the American Committee to Aid Chinese Industrial Cooperatives until 1951 when it split. She revived the committee in 1981. In 1982, it was proposed that the Chinese Industrial Cooperatives be revived again, and the Peking government granted permission for such a revival in 1983.

== Post-China years ==
The Snows' marriage was strained and the Japanese occupation of much of China made life difficult. In December 1940, the Snows decided to move back to the United States as they feared the Japanese would make them prisoners of war. The attack on Pearl Harbor would take place exactly one year later. Prior to their departure, the New York Herald Tribune offered Edgar a position as a war correspondent and Helen encouraged him to take it. She returned to the United States without him. After a short while, Edgar realized he didn't want to be without his wife and the living conditions were too difficult for him to bear. He had already been in China for a decade where his health progressively declined as his diet lacked proper nutrition. Upon his return to the United States, the couple lived in California for a short time and then moved into a small mid-1700s house in Madison, Connecticut.

While the Snows were settled back in America, Edgar would continue to travel back and forth between the U.S. and Europe. His books and reporting on China had earned him critical acclaim in the U.S. This success made Edgar a very valuable asset as a war correspondent. President Roosevelt often looked to Edgar for his understanding on matters in Asia. Roosevelt personally suggested that Edgar become a war correspondent once again, to which Edgar agreed. Though he did not want to report on World War II directly after his time in China, his personal struggles with Helen and encouragement from Roosevelt pushed Edgar to travel and cover the war. In 1945, the couple legally separated. Edgar started a new relationship with actress Lois Wheeler and sought a divorce from Helen which was formalized in 1949. Edgar married Lois less than ten days after the official date of the divorce. He lived in Switzerland until he died from cancer in 1972.

Helen spent the rest of her life in Connecticut, where she developed an interest in family genealogy, drafted a novel, and wrote short pieces on her experiences in China. Although Helen was never tried during the McCarthy era, her works suffered from the idea that she was a communist sympathizer. She often had issues getting new books published and many of her books went out of print. Helen returned to China twice more in her lifetime. The first visit was from 1972 to 1973, following President Richard Nixon's historic 1972 trip to China. The second visit was in 1978 when Helen returned to China for six weeks where she was asked in an interview to recount her adventures with Edgar during the 1930s. She published her autobiography in 1984.

== Death and legacy ==
On January 11, 1997, Helen Foster Snow died at the age of 89 at the Fowler Nursing Center in Guilford, Connecticut. Memorial services were held in Connecticut and China. An official Chinese memorial service took place in the Great Hall of the People on Tiananmen Square in Beijing, an honor rarely bestowed upon foreigners.

Prior to her death, she donated personal papers, book manuscripts, and photographs taken of Chinese notables in the 1930s to the Hoover Institution Library and Archives, which holds 63 manuscript boxes of her papers. After her death, in 1997, Helen's family donated remaining manuscripts, documents, and photographs to the Brigham Young University library. On October 26–27, 2000, BYU held a Helen Foster Snow Symposium to celebrate this donation, and premiere the documentary Helen Foster Snow: Witness to Revolution.

Part of a hospital and a school in Xi'an, China, were named after her. There is also a Helen Foster Snow wing in the Communist Eighth Route Army Museum in Xi'an and a Helen Foster Snow Society in Beijing. In 2009, the US–China Cultural Exchange Committee placed a 7-foot (2.1 m) tall bronze statue of Helen Foster Snow, cast in China, in the Main Street Park of her hometown of Cedar City. In 2011, students and faculty from Southern Utah University began a collaborative project with Chinese musicians, dancers, and artists to create a dance drama based on Helen Foster Snow's life entitled Dream of Helen.

== Awards and honors ==
In 1981, Helen Foster Snow was nominated for the Nobel Peace Prize for her work in China and nominated again in 1982. In her memoir My China Years, Helen writes, "The nomination was not for any particular achievement, but for the potential that my ideas and world view hold for peace and progress in the world". In 1993, Helen was the first recipient of the China Writers Association's literary award. In June 1996, Helen was honored by the Chinese government as Friendship Ambassador, one of China's highest honors offered to foreign citizens. She was the first American and only the fifth person ever to receive the award.

== Works ==
Helen Foster Snow wrote under the pen name Nym Wales, which her husband chose for her. "Nym'' is the Greek word for name. Wales was used because she was part Welsh. However, the pseudonym created questions regarding nationality and whether the author was an "insider" of the Communist Party. Helen's works amount to 40 books and 27 manuscripts.

- Helen Foster Snow, Inside Red China (New York: Doubleday, Doran, 1939). Reprinted: New York: DaCapo 1977, 1979.
- Nym Wales, China Builds for Democracy: A Story of Cooperative Industry (New York,: Modern Age Books, 1941). Reprinted: St. Clair Shores, MI: Scholarly Press, 1972.
- Nym Wales and Kim San, Song of Ariran: A Korean Communist in the Chinese Revolution (New York: The John Day Company, 1941). Reprinted: San Francisco: Ramparts Press, 1972.
- Nym Wales, The Chinese Labor Movement (New York: John Day, 1945). Reprinted: Freeport, NY: Books for Libraries, 1970.
- Nym Wales, Red Dust; Autobiographies of Chinese Communists (Stanford, Calif.,: Stanford University Press, 1952).
- Nym Wales, Fables and Parables for the Mid-Century (New York, Philosophical Library, 1952).
- Nym Wales, Notes on the Left-Wing Painters and Modern Art in China (Madison, Conn., 1961).
- Nym Wales, Women in Modern China (The Hague, Paris: Mouton, 1967).
- Helen Foster Snow, My China Years: A Memoir (New York: Morrow, 1984).
