= Rose Kerr (art historian) =

English art historian

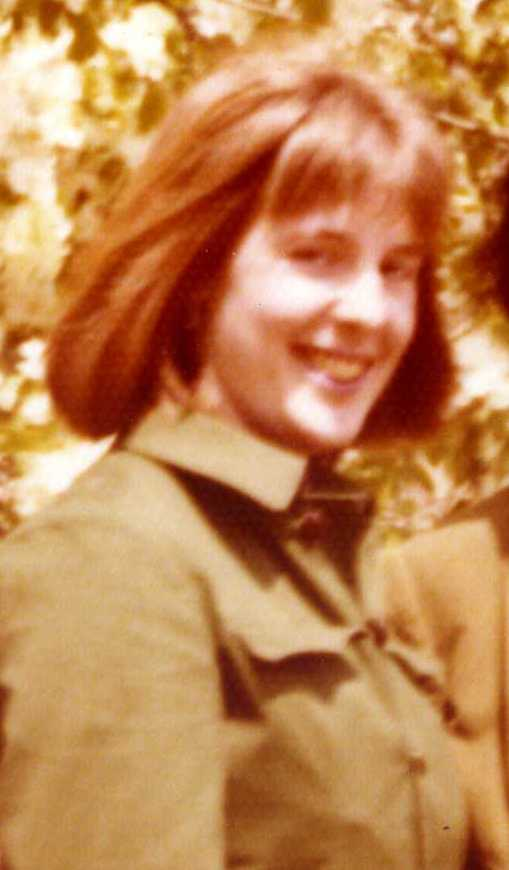
Rose Kerr in China during the Cultural Revolution circa 1975

Rose Kerr (born February 1953) is an English art historian specializing in Chinese art, especially Chinese ceramics, on which she has written a number of books. After studying Mandarin and Chinese art at the School of Oriental and African Studies (1971–75), she worked at the Percival David Foundation (1976–78). She joined the Far Eastern Department of the Victoria and Albert Museum in 1978. She became the Keeper of the Far Eastern Department in 1987, a post she held until her retirement in 2003.

In 2015, she was made an honorary citizen of Jingdezhen, China, the historic centre of Chinese porcelain production, in recognition of her academic research on Jingdezhen ceramics, and her promotion of cultural exchange between the United Kingdom and China. She was the first non-Chinese citizen to be so honoured.

== Early life ==
Rose Kerr was born in February 1953. She graduated in Chinese studies from the School of Oriental and African Studies in London, and was one of a handful of British students to live and study in China during the last year of the Cultural Revolution in 1975-1976.

== Career ==
Kerr was Keeper of the Far Eastern Department at the Victoria & Albert Museum until her retirement in 2003.

Her work with professor Nigel Wood, Science and Civilisation in China Vol. 5 Part 12: Ceramic Technology (ISBN 0521838339) is a major contribution to the seminal series of works on Chinese science begun by Joseph Needham. The volume on Ceramic Technology is a work of almost one thousand pages. It synthesizes information derived from historic texts, archaeological excavation and the principles of ceramic science. It covers the formation of clays and their relation to the underlying geologies of China, firing, manufacturing methods and sequences, glazes, pigments and gilding, and the impact of Chinese ceramic technology around the world from the 7th century onwards. The volume was unique in its coverage, and is a definitive source book for researchers.

Her book Later Chinese Bronzes, (ISBN 1870076117), published by the Victoria and Albert Museum in 1990, broke new ground in the study of Chinese bronzes, and remains an important work of reference. Based on the collection at the Victoria and Albert Museum, the book explored a subject which was at that time new to art history, namely the identification, dating and use of bronze vessels made in the Song-Qing dynasties.

She is honorary associate of the Needham Research Institute at Cambridge University, and an honorary fellow at the University of Glasgow. She is a former chairman, and trustee, of the Great Britain-China Education Trust; a Trustee of the Percival David Foundation of Chinese Art; and Museum Expert Advisor for the Hong Kong Government. She is a former president of the Oriental Ceramic Society of London (2000-2003).

Kerr visits Asia frequently and has undertaken sabbaticals at the National Palace Museum, Taipei, and the Shanghai Museum. She has taught at the universities of London, Sussex, Glasgow, and Oslo, and was a lecturer for the UK National Association of Decorative and Fine Art Societies for many years.

== Honours ==
In 2015, Kerr was created an honorary citizen of Jingdezhen, China, the historic centre of Chinese porcelain production, in recognition of her "outstanding contribution to academic research on Jingdezhen ceramics, and the promotion of cultural exchange between the UK and China", the first non-Chinese citizen to be so honoured.

In 2025 she was appointed a Visiting Research Fellow at the Institute of Ancient Ceramics Research at the National Palace Museum, Beijing

== Selected publications ==
=== 1980s ===
- Kiln Sites of Ancient China. Oriental Ceramic Society, London, 1980. (with P. Hughes Stanton)
- Guanyin: A Masterpiece Revealed. V & A Publications, London, 1985. (with John Larson)
- Chinese Ceramics: Porcelain of the Qing Dynasty. V & A Publications, London 1986.

=== 1990s ===
- Later Chinese Bronzes. V & A Publications, London, 1990.
- Chinese Art and Design. V & A Publications, London, 1991. (Editor)
- Chinese Ceramics of the Middle Ming Period. Percival David Foundation, London, 1994. (with Rosemary Scott)
- 英國維多利亞和阿薾伯特國立博物院藏中國清代瓷器 Qing Dynasty Ceramics in the Victoria and Albert Museum. Guangxi Fine Art Publishing House, Nanning, 1997.

=== 2000s ===
- Blanc De Chine. Porcelain from Dehua. National Heritage Board, Singapore, 2002. (co-author)
- The World in Blue and White. An exhibition of Blue and White ceramics, dating between 1320 and 1820, from members of the Oriental Ceramic Society. Oriental Ceramic Society, London, 2003. (co-author and editor)
- Science and Civilisation in China Vol.5 Part 12 : Ceramic Technology. Cambridge University Press, Needham Research Institute, 2004.(with Nigel Wood)
- Song Dynasty Ceramics. V & A Publications, London, 2004.
- The World in Colours. An exhibition of ceramics with coloured decoration dating from 700 to 1920 belonging to members of the Oriental Ceramic Society. The Oriental Ceramic Society, London, 2006. (co-author and editor)
- 今之眎昔:宋代燿州窯及青白瓷 Song Through 21st Century Eyes: Yaozhou and Qingbai Ceramics. Meijering Art Books, Netherlands, 2009.

=== 2010s ===
- Chinese Export Ceramics. V & A Publications, London, 2011. (with Luisa Mengoni) Chinese edition published by Shanghai Guji, 2013.
- East Asian Ceramics. The Laura Collection. Umberto Allemandi, Italy, 2012. (with Manuele Scagliola and Luisa Mengoni)
- "The Porcelain City": Jingdezhen in the Sixteenth Through Nineteenth Centuries" in William R. Sargent (ed.) Treasures of Chinese Export Ceramics from the Peabody Essex Museum. Yale University Press, New Haven, 2012.
- Chinese Ceramics in the Leonora and Walter F. Brown collection. San Antonio Museum of Art, 2014. (with John Johnson)
- Asian Art in the Rijksmuseum, Amsterdam. Rijksmuseum, Amsterdam, 2014. (various authors)
- Asian Ceramics in the Hallwyl Museum. Stockholm, 2015.
- Tankards and Mugs. Drinking from Chinese Export Porcelain. Jorge Welsh books, London and Lisbon, 2016. (with Maria Antonia Pinto de Matos)
- Chinese Ivory Carvings. The Sir Victor Sassoon Collection. Scala Publishing, 2016. (with Phillip Allen and Shih Ching-fei)
- Marvels of Celadon : The Shan Shan Tang Collection of Yaozhou Wares, The Art Institute of Chicago, Hong Kong, 2019. (co-author)
- 宜興紫砂陶的海外效應 Overseas Effect of Yixing Zisha-stoneware, Yixing Ceramic Museum, Yixing, 2018. (co-author)
- Preface to 'Jingdezhen to the World: The Lurie Collection of Chinese Export Porcelain from the Late Ming Dynasty' by Teresa Canepa, 2019

=== 2020s ===
- 'Song Dynasty Ceramics' 2nd Edition, in English and Chinese, CA Publishing, Hong Kong, 2020
- 'The Edrina Collection of Tang to Qing Export wares', Spring Field Consulting, 2020
- ' Dazzling Official Jun Wares from Museums and Collections around the World' ACC Art Books/CA Publishing 2021
- ' 虚中为用。中国陶瓷的永宣之美 Voids in Clay. The Enduring Beauty of Chinese Ceramics, 3MER Publishing, The Netherlands, 2022
- ' Yaozhou Wares from Museums and Art Institutes Around the World, including Yaozhou Tribute Wares'; ACC Art Books 2021
- ' Jade Green and Kingfisher Blue: Longquan Wares from Museums and Art Institutes around the world'; ACC Art Books 2022
- 'Kindred Spirits - 100 Japanese ceramics in Chinese style'; Arnoldsche Art Publishers, 2024 (with Clare Pollard, Maezaki Shinya, Ai Fukunaga; foreword by Patrick Kwok)
- "李约瑟。中国科学技术史。第五卷化学及相关技术。第十二分册陶瓷技术. Translation of Joseph Needham’s Science and Civilisation in China, Volume 5, Part 12, Ceramic Technology (Science Press and Shanghai Ancient Books Publishing House, Beijing, 2025)"
- ' The Significance of Jade in China's Culture, History, and Art'; a contributing essay. Published by the Woolf Family Trust/Christies International, 2025
- ' Marchant. One Hundred Years 1925-2025'. Editor Published by Marchant, 2025
- The Enduring Charm of Ru Ware from Museums and Art Institutes Around the World (CA Publishing, Hong Kong, 2026)
