= Graham Peck (author) =

American travel and political author

- Born: April 6, 1914 New Haven, Connecticut, USA
- Died: July 3, 1968 (aged 54) Rutland, Vermont, USA
- Occupation: Travel writer and illustrator

Graham Peck (1914-1968) was an American travel writer, illustrator, and official in the wartime United States Office of War Information in China. He is best known for his book Two Kinds of Time, published by Houghton Mifflin in 1950.

Two Kinds of Time is sometimes compared in its point of view and influence with Edgar Snow's Red Star Over China, Theodore White and Annalee Jacoby's Thunder Out of China, and Jack Belden's China Shakes the World. Peck never visited the communist areas, however, and does not write favorably about them. The original publication of the book sold so poorly that it was remaindered.

== Biography ==
Peck was born April 6, 1914, in New Haven, Connecticut, the son of Irving H. Peck a wire hairpin manufacturer, and Sara Hobart Peck. As a boy, he won the Procter & Gamble International Soap-Carving Contest with a mythical horse that he called a unicorn. From then, remarked a later reviewer, he "recklessly mixed oils, drinks, metaphors." He graduated from Andover Academy and a classmate recalled that should have been one of the "roaring young lords who ran things at Yale" but he "did not have the slightest interest in running things at Yale or anywhere else." He planned a trip around the world, but when he got to China he was so charmed by Beijing that he decided to stay. Peck found living was fascinating and cheap; he could live comfortably on $60 a month. His book Through China's Wall (1940), relating his travels, sold well enough to finance a return to China.

After his return in 1940, he worked briefly for the Chinese Industrial Cooperatives (INDUSCO) in the Northwest, then after Pearl Harbor ran an intelligence network for the Office of War Information in Guilin. He lived over a Chinese brothel but travelled widely behind Japanese lines to gather intelligence. After the war he lived in Peking while writing Two Kinds of Time.

Peter Rand, son of Peck’s wartime friend, Christopher Rand, writes that his father and Peck were “soulmates” who shared a love both for drink and for the anarchic spirit of the Chinese people. He writes that it gave them great pleasure to watch the Nationalist Army march out of step. Peck, says Rand, “as it happened, was gay,” which never came out when he was in China. But he was "on the run from a spry, authoritarian father," and "being in China enabled him to express himself in other ways, by getting drunk, for instance, and singing arias from Chinese opera,” in short, to “escape the conventional confinements of his own country.”

Peck illustrated several books for children, including Eric Purdon's The Valley of the Larks (1939), an adventure tale of Mongolia, and Beatrice Liu, Little Wu and the Watermelon (1954), a story of the Miao people of southwest China.

He died in Rutland, Vermont on July 3, 1968 at the age of 54; he had lived in South Pomfret, Vermont and was buried in Oak Cliff Cemetery in Derby.

== Through China's Wall ==
Through China's Wall recounts Peck's travels, including a stay with a Mongol family, a walking tour of Sichuan, and a trip down the Yangzi to Chongqing.

A review in Pacific Affairs said this "record of travels in China may not appear important to the professional geographer, historian, economist or sociologist; but to the average reader it brings a wealth of entertainment." Time Magazine said that book, like its author, "defies classification." It is "part exquisite travel book, part exciting history, part exotic philosophy. But above all it is a portrait portfolio of a race. In deft, humorous, economical sketches, it explains (better than a whole stack of dry-as-dust commentaries) why the Chinese people lose battles but somehow win wars."

== Two Kinds of Time ==
The 1950 publication of Two Kinds of Time was praised by specialists, several of whom had reservations, however. Harold Hinton in The Review of Politics surveyed the most important books on China of the previous five years. Compared to Theodore White and Annalee Jacoby's "brilliant and controversial" Thunder Out of China, he said, Peck's book was "rambling, chaotic, highly personal" and gives "a close view of the confusion, corruption, and inefficiency" of the Nationalist government." Meribeth Cameron's review in Far Eastern Quarterly said Peck's first book, Through China's Wall of 1940 was "one of the most charming and observant of all travel books about China," but when he returned to China he found "detachment... impossible to maintain." As a result, Two Kinds of Time, presents a "sense of the involvement of all of us in the catastrophes which may come to any one people."

The French Sinologist Lucien Bianco drew on Two Kinds of Time in his Origins of the Chinese Revolution. His Conclusion opens with Peck’s observation that Americans had never needed a “real revolution” and therefore found it hard to see that “in a society like China’s, revolution can be a fundamental and entirely natural fact of life, as hard to slow up as a pregnancy.” Bianco notes that the “defect” in Peck's formulation was to suggest that "revolution" is the working of nature rather than of people and ideas, but “at a certain point in time, revolution and destruction were the natural thing.”

The British sinologist T. H. Barrett welcomed the 2008 University of Washington Press reprint. He said that although the 1967 paperback reprint had an Introduction by John K. Fairbank, it left out the second half, which included criticisms of the Nationalist government. The Beijing reprint in hard cover, Barrett went on, was completely reset. He praised the University of Washington 2008 reprint, adding that the useful Introduction by Robert Kapp showed that a younger generation had come to appreciate this "extraordinarily vivid and telling portrait of the 'baseline' from which the post-1949 regime has now brought China through to the end of six decades of turbulent transformation."

Writing in Chinese Historical Review historian Charles Hayford praises Peck's "satirical and sometimes scathing ink sketches" that appear on most pages and show Chinese as individuals and the "decadence and incompetence of their officials." He suggests Peck, like other wartime reporters, sees China as "feudal," and warns "Nowadays we cringe when anybody seriously speaks of a 'feudal' or unchanging China." Yet "the density of Peck’s observation still convinces that there were systematic problems in Nationalist China," adding that "Peck’s detailing of the willful indifference and incompetence of local and central government officials is appalling."

In the early twenty-first century, Two Kinds of Time came to be mentioned as a classic. James Fallows recommended it as "brilliantly written" and added that it "puts into perspective how much has changed in China and how much has not." Jeremiah Jenne in 2025 saw continuing lessons for Americans, saying the book was "an autopsy of the Kuomintang (KMT) regime that fell in 1949; an indictment of American strategic myopia in its China policy of the 1940s; and a timely jeremiad about the dangers of overreach as the world entered the Cold War."

Nicholas Clifford saw Two Kinds of Time as "half travel book, half analysis of Nationalist failures". It has about it "a kind of hopelessness at odds with the optimism that characterizes similar accounts," such as those by Agnes Smedley, who saw Mao Zedong's Yan'an as showing China as revolutionary, or Edgar Snow's Red Star Over China, that saw possibilities of revolution. Peck never visited the communist areas but he despised Chiang Kai-shek, who was "not a modern man." Peck, Clifford continued, drew on "the full repertoire of negative images borne down through the generations: images of corruption, superstition, cruelty, and a mindless, stupid conservatism." To Peck, Chiang's China was no more than a monstrous "practical joke." He finds his fellow Americans, however, "whether diplomats, military men, or missionaries, to be obtuse and patronizing at best, outright racists at worst."

== China: The Remembered Life ==
After returning to the United States, Peck lived quietly out of sight. In 1968 he published China: The Remembered Life, an as-told-to memoir of Paul Frilman, a wartime friend who had been chaplain to the Flying Tigers. The book includes a first-hand account of the missionary John Birch and his death at the hands of Communist guerrillas, which differs from the one offered by the society bearing his name.

== Publications ==
=== Articles ===
- --- (1949). (Review) The War in Burma; The Big Circle, by R. McKelvie & H. Yung-chi]. Pacific Affairs, 22(4), 437–438. https://doi.org/10.2307/275158

=== Books ===
- ---, Graham Peck, Through China's Wall (Boston,: Houghton Mifflin Company, 1940 London: Collins, 1941) Internet Archive here
- —— (1950), Two Kinds of Time, Boston: Houghton Mifflin Reprinted; Seattle: University of Washington Press (2008) ISBN 978 0 295 98852 8; Beijing, Foreign Languages Press, Light on China Series, 2004.
- —— (1967), Two Kinds of Time, Boston: Houghton Mifflin; Second edition, Revised and abridged Internet Archive free copy here.
- Frillmann, Paul; Peck, Graham. Introduction by John K. Fairbank (1968). China; the Remembered Life. Boston: Houghton Mifflin.

=== Illustrated ===
- Eric Purdon, The Valley of the Larks (1939)
- Beatrice Liu,Little Wu and the Watermelon (1954) Internet Archive here
