= Jack Belden =

American war correspondent

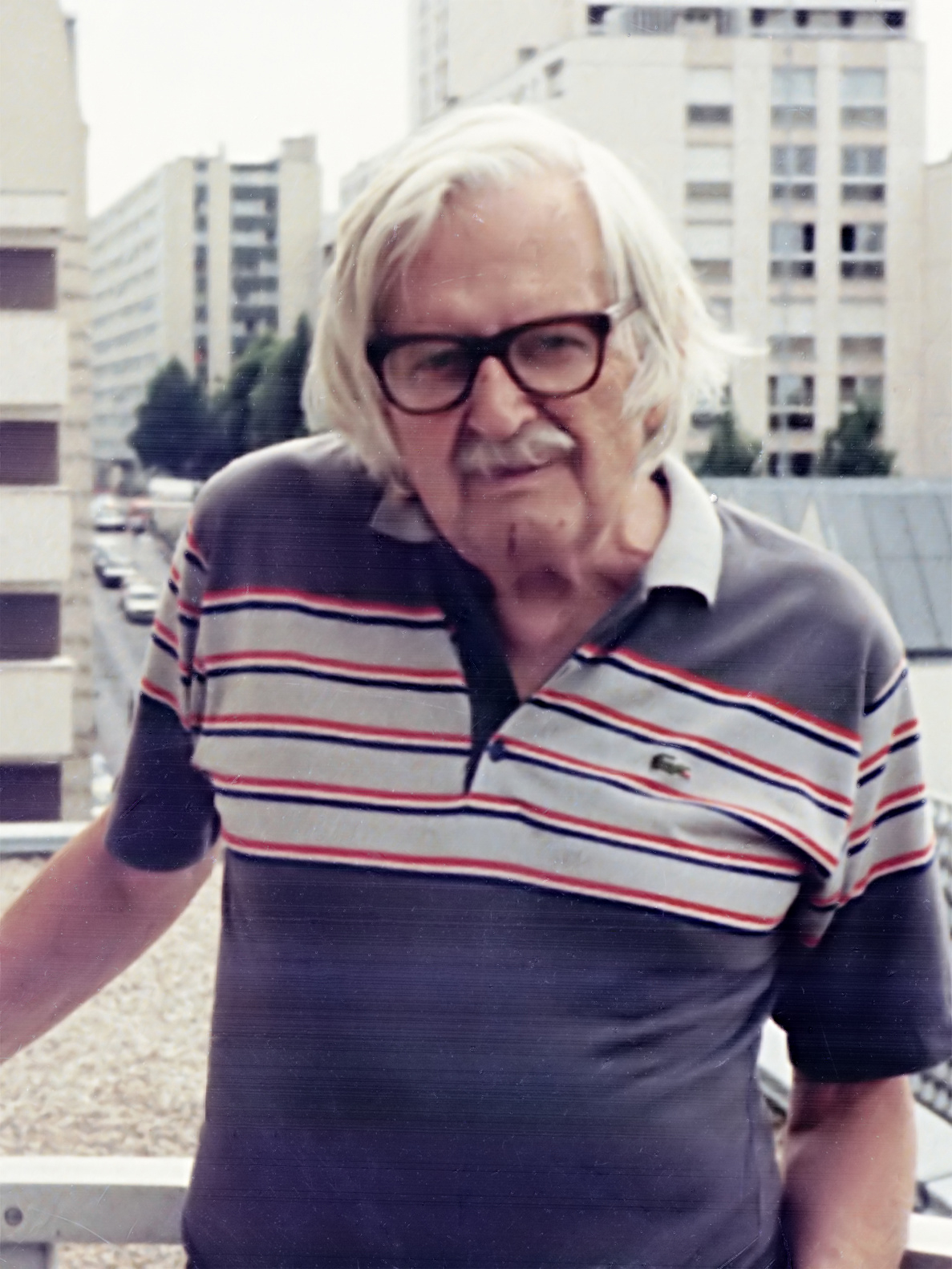
- Jack Belden in 1984
- Born: February 3, 1910; Brooklyn, New York, U.S.
- Died: June 3, 1989 (aged 79); Paris
- Occupations: Author, War correspondent
- Writing career
- Period: 1936–1952
- Genres: War, Politics

Jack Belden (February 3, 1910 – June 3, 1989) was an American war correspondent who covered the Japanese invasion of China, the Second World War in Europe, and the Chinese Civil War in the late 1940s.

Belden traveled to the front lines to cover events from the point of view of ordinary soldiers and villagers. He acquired fluent Chinese and in 1942 accompanied General Joseph Stilwell on the Chinese Army's retreat from Burma. After recovering from injuries suffered while covering the Italian campaign, he returned to China. His final book China Shakes the World (1949) initially sold few copies, but was reissued in 1970 and became known as a classic of China reporting.

== Life ==
After graduating with honors from Colgate University at the beginning of the Depression, Belden found work as a merchant seaman. In 1933, he jumped ship in Shanghai. He learned Chinese and eventually got a job covering local courts for Shanghai's English-language newspapers. After Japan invaded China in 1937, Belden was hired by United Press. Life magazine soon picked him up and he spent most of the Second World War as a correspondent for Time and Life in China, North Africa and Europe.

Belden was noted for getting closer to the action than most of the international press corps who, hampered by their inability to speak the language, usually stayed close to official sources of information. The New York Times' correspondent Tillman Durdin recalled, "Occasionally we were able to get into the field with the Chinese troops and see what was going on. Generally, we relied on Jack Belden and Joseph Stilwell, who collaborated in keeping track of where the Chinese armies were and what they were doing. Jack and Stilwell would plunge off into the hinterland and come back with information about the situation at the front, all of which was made available to us."

In 1942, Belden earned some fame for being the only reporter who remained with Stilwell in Burma when the American General and his headquarters staff were cut off by the invading Japanese. Belden's book Retreat With Stilwell (1943) chronicled the journey that "Vinegar Joe", his staff and others made, mostly on foot, to India.

Belden went on to cover the war for Life in North Africa and Europe. In North Africa, he covered the British 8th Army's grueling march from Egypt to Tunisia. Again, Belden distinguished himself by getting as close to the combat and the people fighting it as possible. Correspondent Don Whitehead, who would go on to win two Pulitzer Prizes declared that Belden had inspired him. In his book, Beachhead Don, Whitehead recalls noticing that Belden would disappear from time to time from the company of the other reporters. When Whitehead asked where he had been, Belden replied that he had been at the front with the troops. Chastened, Whitehead says, "I decided I would use the Belden approach to reporting and get as close as I possibly could to the fighting."

After the Africa campaign, Belden landed with the invading troops in Sicily and Salerno.

In 1943, Belden's leg was shattered by machine-gun fire during the Salerno invasion. After recovering in the U.S., he returned to Europe and covered the invasion of France and the end of the War in Europe. Eric Sevareid, in his autobiography Not So Wild a Dream, recounts crossing paths with Belden in the final weeks before the Nazi surrender.

A collection of short essays, Still Time to Die, (1944) includes his reportage from battlefields in Asia, North Africa and Europe.

== The book China Shakes The World ==
Belden's best remembered work was his last, which joins Edgar Snow's Red Star Over China, Graham Peck's Two Kinds of Time, and Theodore White and Annalee Jacoby's Thunder Out of China as classics which shaped Western understanding of the Chinese Communist Revolution.

When Belden returned to the United States in 1947, a magazine editor shouted that he wasn't going to print "any of this goddam lefty stuff." But Belden returned to China to report on the Civil War between the Kuomintang and the Chinese Communist Party.

Belden avoided Mao's Yan'an: "that cave village had become a tourist center with every foreign correspondent in China hopping over to have a quick look... I had no desire to get mixed up in that circus, fearing that it might be very hard for me to get in close contact with the people, the war or their revolution." Belden felt Mao Zedong represented the party apparatchik or the intellectual, and saw in the villages that the Communists were not trying to establish a "utopian democracy."

The first part of the book is based on eye-witness, participant reporting which leads the reader to the conclusion that the Communist dominated Border Region Government had the allegiance of local leaders. Belden devoted sections to village personalities: Gold Flower, the story of an abused woman; Field Mouse, a guerilla commander; The Beggar Writer; and the Guerilla Girl.

Belden goes on to make a strong second point: while the local village revolution had the potential for democratic progress, Mao's national revolution had the potential for despotism. "The Communists", he reasoned, "took power by making love to the people of China," and "won the people to their cause" by meeting their needs better. But in order to do so, Mao and the Party built a "wholly new power apparatus." They may have sincerely intended to represent the interests of the common people but their new power apparatus would also "elude their intentions and tend to exist for its own sake." He warned that "there may arise a new elite, a set of managers standing above the Chinese masses", bringing a danger that "rulers not subject to democratic checks" may "confusing themselves with God", "expand their private viewpoints into an arbitrary vision of what society should be..., force their dreams on others, blunder into grave political mistakes and finally plunge into outright tyranny."

Belden published China Shakes the World in 1949, when the American public had lost interest in reports from China. The book's reputation came only in the 1960s, when the Monthly Review Press reprinted it in paperback with a sympathetic introduction by Owen Lattimore.

== Later life ==
After writing China Shakes the World, Belden married twice leaving two sons, David from his first marriage and Jack from his second. Having left journalism and his families, he moved to Summit, New Jersey to live with his mother where he worked at a series of jobs including school bus driver. He eventually returned to Paris, where he died in 1989.

== Works ==
- Retreat with Stilwell (New York: Knopf, 1943).
- Still Time to Die (New York: Harper, 1944). 322p.
- China Shakes the World (New York: Harpers, 1949). 524p. Reprinted: (New York; London: with an introduction by Owen Lattimore, Monthly Review, 1970; Beijing: Foreign Languages Press, 1989).
- Gold Flower's Story (Boston, Ma.: New England Free Press, 1970). Reprint of Chapter 42 of China Shakes the World
