= The Mountain Road =

1960 film by Daniel Mann

- Original film poster
- Directed by: Daniel Mann
- Written by: Alfred Hayes
- Based on: The Mountain Road; 1958 novel by Theodore H. White
- Produced by: William Goetz
- Starring: James Stewart; Lisa Lu; Glenn Corbett; Harry Morgan; Frank Silvera; James Best
- Cinematography: Burnett Guffey
- Edited by: Edward Curtiss
- Music by: Jerome Moross
- Distributed by: Columbia Pictures
- Release date: June 15, 1960
- Running time: 102 min, filmed in 1.85: 1 widescreen
- Country: United States
- Language: English
- Box office: $1.5 million (US and Canada rentals)

The Mountain Road is a 1960 American war film starring James Stewart and directed by Daniel Mann. Set in China and based on the 1958 novel of the same name by journalist-historian Theodore H. White, the film follows the attempts of a U.S. Army major to destroy bridges and roads potentially useful to the Japanese during World War II and the Second Sino-Japanese War. White's time covering China for Time magazine during the war led to an interview with former OSS Major Frank Gleason Jr., who served as head of a demolition crew that inspired the story and film. (Note: In December 1944, Major Gleason headed up a group that stopped the Japanese advance when the demolition team blew up over 150 bridges and then destroyed over 50,000 tons of munitions in Dushan County, Guizhou.) Gleason was later hired as an uncredited technical adviser for the film.

The film is a rather somber treatment of World War II and the Second Sino-Japanese War. This includes themes that were taboo for Hollywood during the war years, such as tensions between allies and racism among American troops. The protagonist is a frustrated and morally conflicted U.S. officer unsure about the value of his mission. For these reasons, The Mountain Road is often labeled as anti-war, but it was made with the cooperation of the Pentagon, and it is much more respectful of the military as an institution than are the well-known anti-war films of the 1960s and 1970s.

As a World War II combat veteran, Stewart had vowed never to make a war film, concerned that they were rarely realistic. (Note: Stewart did not speak publicly of his wartime experiences, and after the war, he had refused to appear in war movies, although he had starred in Malaya (1949).) The Mountain Road was the only war movie set during World War II in which he starred as a combatant. Stewart, however, had been featured in a wartime short, Winning Your Wings (1942), and in a civilian role in Malaya (1949). Harry Morgan, another cast member in The Mountain Road, later said that he believed that Stewart made an "exception for this film because it was definitely anti-war".

== Plot ==
In 1944, Major Baldwin of the United States Army Corps of Engineers is ordered to blow up an airfield. Headquarters in Kunming orders him to use his pre-war engineering expertise to delay the advancing Japanese forces as much as possible while retreating by road, but General Loomis gives him the option to return to base with him by air. Baldwin makes the riskier choice to lead his first command. Loomis is reluctant to let him because of his inexperience as a commander, but relents.

War brings Major Baldwin and Madame Su-Mei Hung together in an unlikely pairing.

Baldwin has at his command Sergeant Michaelson, Sergeant Ballo, Prince, Lewis, Miller, Collins (the demolition team's translator), and Niergaard, a Jeep and four trucks. On the road, Baldwin finds out from Chinese commander Colonel Li that the Japanese wish to capture a munitions dump 120 miles (190 km) away. Li wants Baldwin to blow up the munitions, but Baldwin does not want to go that far out of his way. Li assigns Colonel Kwan to the team, but before they can embark, Madame Sue-Mei Hung, the American-educated widow of a general, joins them, with Baldwin gradually becoming attracted to her. Her husband was executed when he disobeyed one order while obeying a different one.

Baldwin blows up a bridge and uses deceit to push a civilian truck over a cliff to keep on pace, trying to reach the munitions dump before the Japanese. Sue-Mei and Baldwin are at odds over his cavalier treatment of the Chinese when he resorts to blowing up a mountain road, leaving thousands of local Chinese refugees trapped. After stopping at a village because Miller is ill with pneumonia, Collins tries to give out the surplus food that the team has brought, but is trampled to death by starving villagers. Baldwin is furious and resolute in trying to complete his mission, and is finally successful blowing up the munitions storage.

Baldwin sends Miller ahead in one of the army trucks to transport the ailing Lewis and the body of Collins. They discover it stolen by Chinese army-deserter bandits, with Miller and Lewis found stripped and executed. Baldwin exacts revenge by rolling a gas barrel into the bandits' outpost and setting the village on fire. Baldwin asks Sue-Mei to understand why he had to act that way, but there is no reconciliation between them, for she cannot forgive him and leaves him. Although recognizing that his retribution was fundamentally excessive and brutal, Baldwin radios his report to headquarters, and is praised for fulfilling his mission.

== Cast ==
- James Stewart as Major Baldwin
- Lisa Lu as Madame Su-Mei Hung (film debut)
- Glenn Corbett as Collins
- Harry Morgan as Sergeant Michaelson
- Mike Kellin as Prince
- Rudy Bond as Miller
- Eddie Firestone as Lewis
- Frank Silvera as Colonel Kwan
- Frank Maxwell as Sergeant Ballo
- James Best as Niergaard
- Alan Baxter as General Loomis
- Leo Chen as Colonel Li
- P. C. Lee as Chinese general

== Production ==
Although the Japanese invaders were the feared antagonists, they never appear, as The Mountain Road diverges from typical World War II action films by dealing with a more sensitive subplot, delving into the cultural misunderstanding and racial prejudice between American soldiers and their Chinese allies. White's original story contained a serious message that stemmed from his extended sojourn in China, first as a freelance reporter in 1938, and shortly thereafter as correspondent for Time magazine. White found his stories depicting the corruption of the Nationalist government and warnings of the growing threat of communism being rewritten by Chinese government officials with the cooperation of editors at his magazine. When he left his post and returned to the United States in 1946, White and colleague Anna Lee Jacoby wrote a best-selling nonfiction book Thunder Out of China, describing the country in wartime. His follow-up novel The Mountain Road also reflected his interest in a China in turmoil.

During planning, a number of actors and production staff were considered, including Marlon Brando and Robert Mitchum for the male lead role, Chinese actress Dora Ding as the female lead, James Wong Howe as director of photography, and Don Rickles, who was making a name as a "second banana" in films. Lisa Lu, who played Madame Sue-Mei Hung in her first major role, recruited P. C. Lee, Leo Chen, Richard Wang and C. N. Hu, faculty members from the Chinese Mandarin Department, Army Language School, to appear in the film.

Principal photography began on June 9, 1959, with location filming taking place at various Arizona locations. The set for the Chinese village was erected on the Horse Mesa Dam Road, 40 miles (64 km) east of Phoenix. Another set was erected in the vicinity of Superstition Mountain. The Fish Creek Hill Bridge on the Apache Trail was revamped to resemble the Chinese wooden bridge that is blown up, and the temple set, ammunition and supply station, as well as the airfield, were erected in Nogales. The battle scenes were filmed at the Columbia Ranch in Burbank, California. The extreme heat at the locations caused frequent cases of heat prostration among the cast and crew. Production wrapped on August 20, 1959.

== Reception ==
Although a minor film in James Stewart's repertoire, The Mountain Road was received favorably, if considered somewhat puzzling. The New York Times reviewer Howard Thompson noted, "Even with its final, philosophical overtones, this remains a curiously taciturn, dogged and matter-of-fact little picture—none too stimulating… bluntly, and none too imaginatively."

Variety focused on Stewart's role, stating, "As played by James Stewart, the American major holds the film together."

Theodore H. White had mixed feelings about the film. In his memoirs, he describes seeing it at a theater in Times Square, where a group of teenagers sitting behind him cheered the explosions and the Americans' revenging the deaths of their comrades with the destruction of the village. One of them said, "The hell with it. That's the best part of the picture. The rest is crap." White wrote that he came to agree, saying that he had written the ending based on his experience as a reporter at the time: "refusing to acknowledge guilt in Asia…". But by the time when he wrote his memoirs, he had come to feel that the "reality of the twenty-five-year-long American record in Asia was that of genuine good will exercised in mass killing, a grisly irony which White could master neither in film nor book. Asia was a bloody place; we had no business there; novel and movie should have said just that at whatever risk."

=== Home media ===
The Mountain Road was released in a fullscreen ratio on VHS. A widescreen DVD was released for distribution on September 16, 2022. The film has also been televised on the American Get TV network.
