= The Battle for Asia =

1941 book by Edgar Snow

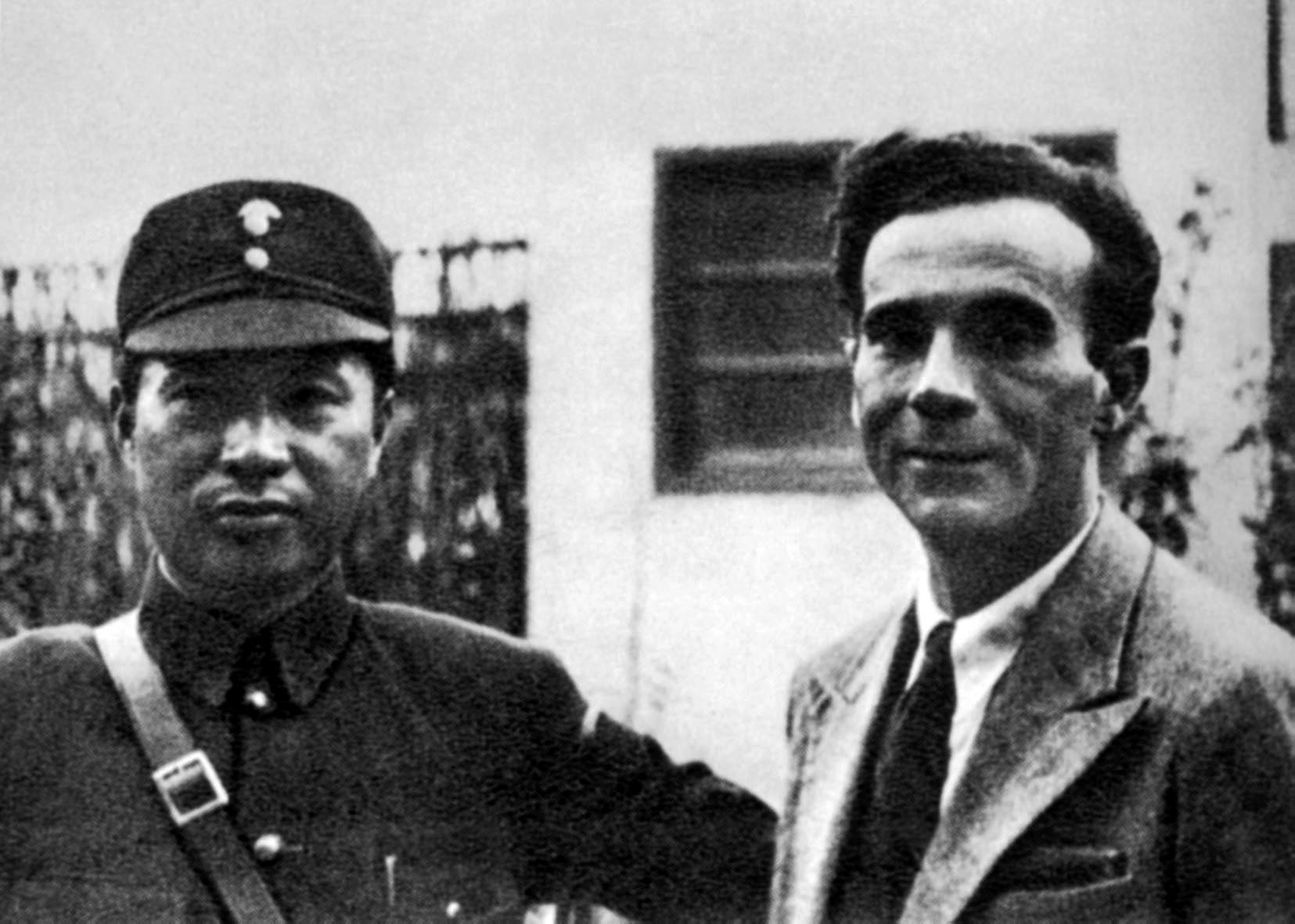
Edgar Snow (Right) in 1938

The Battle for Asia is a book by Edgar Snow, published by Random House in April 1941. It portrays China during the early years of the Second Sino-Japanese War.

== Background ==
Edgar Snow arrived in Yanan, China on July 13, 1936, with the help of Madame Soong Ching Ling. Before Edgar Snow's arrival, very little was known about the Chinese Communists from the outside world.

Once in Yanan, Edgar Snow met the leader of the Chinese Communist Party Mao Zedong. Edgar's early years in "Red China" would be the basis for his book "Red Star Over China." which was published in 1937, and was reported to be a big hit in London, selling 100,000 copies.

Following the outbreak of the Second Sino-Japanese War in 1937, Edgar Snow began reporting on the conflict, which would be the basis for his book The Battle for Asia.

== Synopsis ==
The Battle for Asia reports on the events and atmosphere of China during the early years of the Second Sino-Japanese war.

The book opens with the Japanese occupation of Peking following the Marco Polo Bridge Incident, and the round-up, and execution of local resistance fighters by the Japanese within the city.

Following Peking, Edgar provides a background on the rise of the Empire of Japan, from the Meiji Restoration to the Mukden Incident.

Afterward, Edgar reports on the Battle of Shanghai, the Battle of Nanjing, and the events of the Nanjing Massacre, including looting, the murder, and rape of Chinese civilians by the Japanese Army, as well as the Bombing of the USS Panay.

In 1938, Edgar Snow starts reporting on Hankow. A city that Edgar described as already under siege by the time he arrived in the city in 1938. Snow would report on the dire situation in Hankow for the next three months.

Following the fall of Hankow in October 1938, Edgar Snow briefly set up his headquarters in the British colony of Hong Kong, where he reported on the apathy of the local British, and Chinese elites in Hong Kong towards the war in the mainland. After spending several months in Hong Kong he arrived in Chungking in the Summer of 1939 to continue reporting on the conflict.

In addition to the main events in the Second Sino-Japanese War, Edgar Snow delves into other subjects connected to the war. Rewi Alley, the Chinese Industrial Cooperatives, Kim Yak-San and the Korean Independence Movement in Free China, Chinese Turkistan, and "China's Japanese Allies" in Free China, such as Kaji Wataru, and Kazuo Aoyama.

The last chapter of the book discusses the inevitable war between Japan and the Western powers (Britain, America, and the Dutch), the conflict in China spreading into Burma, Malaya, and the East Indies, and an alliance between Japan and Thailand, the only independent nation in Asia other than Japan.
