= Chinese famine of 1942–1943 =

1942–1943 famine in Henan, China

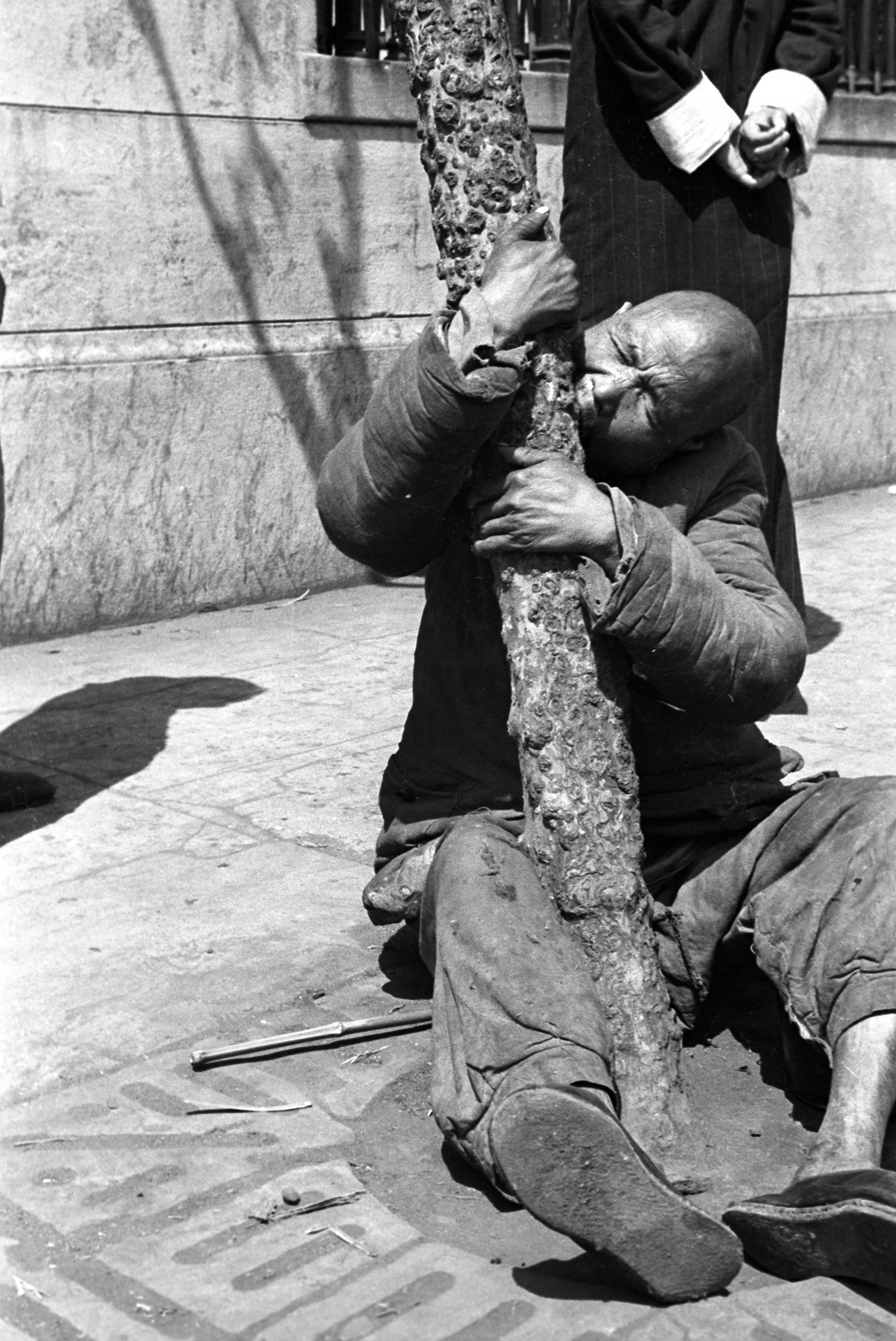
- Famine victim crazed with hunger gnaws bark from tree, 1942.
- Country: Henan, China
- Period: Summer 1942 – Spring 1943
- Total deaths: 700,000 – 3 million
- Causes: Caused by drought, locusts, Second Sino-Japanese War, 1938 Yellow River flood, corruption, and government inefficiency

The province of Henan in the modern People's Republic of China.

The Henan famine of 1942–1943 (Chinese: 河南大饑荒) occurred within the context of the Second Sino-Japanese War and resulted from a combination of natural and human factors. Anthony Garnaut put the death toll to be "well under one million", probably around 700,000, while Lloyd Eastman estimated that two to three million starved to death.

== Famine ==
=== Causes ===
The war had already ravaged Henan. In 1938 the Nationalist government flooded the Yellow River in an attempt to stop the advance of the Japanese, inundating eastern and central Henan, central Anhui and north-central Jiangsu. As many as 400,000 to 500,000 Northern Chinese civilians and Japanese soldiers died from famine, disease, and flooding. Environmental historian Micah S. Muscolino suggests that the deliberate flooding of the Yellow River in 1938 contributed to a total disruption of Henan's hydraulic and agricultural systems. In 1942 the spring and summer rains failed and locusts damaged the standing harvest, which greatly reduced the grain supply by the winter of that year.

The largest Japanese offensive of the war was Operation Ichi-Go. When it reached Henan in the spring of 1944, Japanese troops caused vast destruction. Henan was divided into the eastern half of the province under occupation by Japan and the western half nominally under the authority of the Nationalist government based in Chongqing. Chinese and Japanese authorities continued to requisition grain to feed their soldiers. They conscripted nearly a million unpaid men and women to maintain Yellow River dikes, coerced hundreds of thousands of farmers to collect grain in carts and wheelbarrows to feed the army, forced them to provide food for the army's animals, and to work on roads, and to dig a trench which did not stop the invaders.

Theodore White's special report for Time magazine, published in March 1943, reached the American public. Cannibalism was rife and parents sold their children just to survive. Disease bred in these conditions, contributing greatly to the death toll.

Rana Mitter places much of the blame on corrupt or incompetent local officials. He notes that Chiang announced a reduction in the grain quota for Henan, but the head of the Henan grain administration collected more than the quota demanded anyway. Officials in neighboring provinces refused to send their surplus grain to Henan. In Runan County a grain storage system had been set up at the outbreak of war but officials had never actually stored the grain and used it instead to make private deals. Theodore White described being invited to a feast by local authorities which included delicacies such as 'chicken, beef, water chestnut and three cakes with sugar frosting'. The Chongqing government is, however, blamed for reacting slowly and sending paper money instead of food for relief. Mitter notes that the famine can be seen as a consequence of the reduction of the Nationalist government's authority over the provinces as the war dragged on. He also says that Chiang's government was also reluctant to press further for a reduction in the grain tax when national survival was at stake.

=== Death toll ===
Anthony Garnaut, an historian at the University of Melbourne, puts the famine deaths to be "well under one million", probably around 700,000. The official count of 1,484,983, compiled in 1943, was grossly exaggerated as it included fertility loss (decline in births) and outward migration. Quantitative calculations found that "fertility loss and excess deaths would have made a similar contribution to total population loss [of combined 1,484,983]", according to Garnaut. Another common incorrect figure, 3 to 5 millions deaths, is "generally unsourced or based on the estimates of eyewitnesses such as Theodore White, and without reference to detailed demographic data". Such a high estimate tends to make the Great Chinese famine in 1959–1961 look less deadly in comparison. Lloyd Eastman writes that two to three million died as a result of the famine, which caused a further 3,000,000 to leave the province as refugees.

This table shows the county by county breakdown of the 1943 official count of 1,484,983. The figures are a useful comparison among counties of famine severity rather than as an accurate depiction of the death toll.

Estimated death toll per county in Henan
County	Death Toll	County	Death Toll	County	Death Toll
Mengxian (孟县)	95,121	Yuxian (禹县)	151,028	Changge (长葛)	58,802
Huangchuan (潢川)	37,392	Xingyang (荥阳)	30,347	Weishi (尉氏)	29,654
Xinzheng (新郑)	34,353	Mixian (密县)	34,593	Guangwu (广武)	15,875
Sishui (汜水)	14,306	Xuchang (许昌)	183,472	Lushan ( 鲁山)	13,822
Linying (临颖)	79,715	Xiangxian (襄县)	118,433	Yanling (鄢陵)	108,498
Linru (临汝)	36,446	Baofeng (宝丰)	11,539	Jiaxian ( 郏县)	34,458
Yancheng (郾城)	40,835	Yexian (叶县)	103,737	Fangcheng (方城)	38,974
Fugou (扶沟)	44,210	Xihua (西华)	51,989	Shangshui (商水)	25,899
Xiangcheng (项城)	32,147	Shenqiu (沈邱)	12,815	Dengfeng (登封)	23,517
Shanxian (陕县)	19,100	Yanshi (偃师)	7,916	Total	1,488,993

== Political ramifications ==
When Chinese forces fled the overwhelming Japanese offensive, peasants in many locations disarmed and shot them, then welcomed the Japanese. Local governments in Communist-controlled areas did reduce the grain quotas for those most affected by the drought. Mao Zedong exploited this 'obvious point of comparison' to portray his government as more benevolent than the Nationalist government. The Communists were able to pursue this policy in part because they depended on guerilla warfare and did not need to maintain a standing army.

== Legacy ==
The Chinese famine of 1942–1943 has been referred to as 'China's forgotten famine', overshadowed by the war that took place around it and the Great Chinese Famine of 1958–1961. Novelist Liu Zhenyun says that there is a "collective amnesia" in Henan about the famine. Interest in the event has rekindled in recent years, however, with the release of the film Back to 1942, adapted from Liu Zhenyun's novel Remembering 1942.

== See also ==
- Bengal famine of 1943
- Cannibalism in Asia
- Dutch famine of 1944–1945
- Great famine of Greece
- Holodomor
- Vietnamese famine of 1944–1945

== References and further reading ==
- Garnaut, Anthony. "A quantitative description of the Henan famine of 1942." Modern Asian Studies 47.6 (2013): 2007-2045. DOI: https://doi.org/10.1017/S0026749X13000103
- Muscolino, Micah S. The Ecology of War in China: Henan Province, the Yellow River, and Beyond, 1938–1950 (Cambridge UP, 2014).
- Ó Gráda, Cormac. "The ripple that drowns? Twentieth-century famines in China and India as economic history 1." Economic History Review 61 (2008): 5–37 online.
- White, Theodore; Jacoby, Annalee (1946). Thunder Out of China. New York: Sloane.
- Van Slyke, Lyman (24 July 1986). "The Chinese Communist Movement, 1937-1945". In Feuerwerker, Albert; Fairbank, John (eds.). The Cambridge History of China, Vol. 13, Republican China 1912–1949, Part 2. Cambridge: Cambridge University Press. pp. 609–722. ISBN 978-0-521-24338-4.
