= China: The Roots of Madness =

1967 American made-for-TV documentary film

- Full film
- Directed by: Mel Stuart
- Written by: Theodore H. White
- Produced by: David L. Wolper
- Starring: Empress Dowager Cixi, Yuan Shikai, Sun Yatsen, Mao Zedong, Chiang Kai-shek, Soong Mei-ling, Joseph Stilwell, Pearl Buck
- Narrated by: Joseph Campanella
- Music by: Harry Freedman
- Distributed by: A made-for-television documentary, not released for commercial purpose, played on 101 channels in 41 states between January 30 and February 5, 1967.
- Release date: January 31, 1967
- Running time: 90 min
- Country: USA
- Languages: English, won an Emmy Award in the documentary category
- Budget: Donation from John and Paige Curran, and sponsored by Xerox Corp. Xerox Corp.

China: The Roots of Madness is a 1967 Cold War era made-for-TV documentary film produced by David L. Wolper, written by Pulitzer Prize winning journalist Theodore H. White with production cost funded by a donation from John and Paige Curran. The film has been released under Creative Commons license. It won an Emmy Award in the documentary category.

The film attempts to analyze the anti-Western sentiment in China from the official American perspective, covering 170 years of China's political history, from Boxer Rebellion of the Qing Dynasty to Red Guards of Cultural Revolution. The film focuses on the power struggle between the Kuomintang and the Chinese Communist Party, amid heavy political intervention from Moscow, with Sun Yat-sen, Chiang Kai-shek and Mao Zedong playing the pivotal role at the center stage.

== Introduction ==
The documentary film was made for television in 1967, during the Cold War. It was written by Pulitzer Prize-winning journalist Theodore H. White, directed by Mel Stuart, edited by William T. Cartwright, and produced by David L. Wolper. Production costs were funded by a donation from John and Paige Curran. The film has been released under Creative Commons license.

White's access to important political figures of the time allowed him to create some rare footage, which included the wedding of Chang and the funeral of Sun. The film won an Emmy Award in the documentary category.

As evidenced by his commentary throughout the films, White, Time magazine's China correspondent during World War II, was scathing about the People's Republic of China. Remarking that Chinese had been suffering in a 100-year tragedy, he added:

There are 700 million Chinese [in 1967], one quarter of human kind, who are taught to hate, their growing power is the world's greatest threat to peace enlightenment. 50 years of torment, bred madness....
For 50 years, Americans have failed to help the Chinese to find "some entry to the modern world", as the Chinese have "been transformed from our greatest friend into our greatest enemy", as the Chinese have fallen into the vicious cycle of "from the tyranny of Confucius of the Manchu Emperor to the tyranny of communism and Mao.

== Synopsis ==
=== Episode one ===
White referred to Empress Dowager Cixi as "China's evil spirit... a Manchu concubine... said to have poisoned her own son upon his throne, install her infant nephew as the emperor, killed his mother, and then imprisoned him in 1898."

=== Episode two ===
White's impression on the downfall of Qing Dynasty: "...and then it vanished, simply vanished, the Manchu Dynasty disappeared overnight, nothing like that had ever happen in all the history, 2000 years of tradition, the whole structure of the imperial confucianism, political thought, dissolving to dust...."

On post-Qing China, "out of this turbulence, there appeared two types of Asian leaders, arch symbols, the man of gun, and the man of idea, and these two types of gunman and the dreamer, have perplexed all our efforts in Asia for 50 years since, and they still perplexed and haunted all our policy, even today..."

Sun "was a man of dream, the dream of China, powerful, free of emperors and foreigners, made him from his youth a revolutionary.... Slowly from the early 1920, Sun Yatsen had somehow built a government, a tiny southern foothold at Canton, ringed by hostile warlords. By 1924 the ageing revolutionary had learned, idea and gun must go together... in 1923 he tells the New York Times: We have lost hope of help from America, England, France, the only country that show any sign of helping us in the south is the Soviet government of Russia...."

=== Episode three ===
The Kuomintang left wing "no longer trust their army leader at the front. Borodin is urging: 'Get rid of Chiang Kai-shek.' In four short years, the communist had grown 60,000 members. To hear the left wing Nationalist: 'No revolution is completed, until peasants own their land, and workers their factories.' Chiang disagreed."

=== Episode four ===
"When Mao left at 1927 with a dozen of his ally, it was as if a ghost had risen from the dead, he was disgusted with Borodin and his Russian documents. He felt the key of revolution in Asia lied in the countryside, not the big city proletariat. Mao's idea was simple, turn the hidden peasant's anger towards the local gentry, the local rich.... Mao transformed the countryside into a total environment of hate, women, children, everyone, not to be afraid to die... by 1932, he controlled a good chunk of Hunan, Jiangxi, claimed the loyalty of 9 million people."

=== Episode five ===
"Day and night the bombs continue, yet Chiang persists. Powerless to strike back, Chiang knows, only the Americans can help.... It is about this time 1941, at the height of the bombing, I had my first talk with Chiang Kai-shek, about the war with Japan, and strategy. At the end, almost just an afterthought, he said, "remember, Japanese is a disease of the skin, the communists are the disease of the heart." It seems odd to me, because at that time the Japanese were bombing the daylight out of both Chiang Kai-shek and the communist, both of them are ally against the Japanese. And now in retrospect, almost a vision of the apocalypse to come."

=== Episode six ===
On Manchuria after the Japanese surrender, "the Russian hed temporarily occupied Manchuria by the surrender term of Japan. Communist expected to get from Russian surrender Japanese equipment and guns, and hold the countryside before Chiang arrived.... Manchuria is the topic of the struggle. Industries Japan had built and left is the greatest pride in China. Chiang's American equipped troops seize all major cities, to find a hollow triumph. The Russian occupiers had rooted every factories before withdrawn, rip out shops and stores where great machines once stood."

=== Episode seven ===
"In American custody in Hong Kong there are cascades and piles of translation coming from the Chinese, these are sands, gritty, gravels, little bit of information, meaningless, because we don't know who does what to who in Peking, we don't know how they think, or how they make up their mind, because no matter how hard we study China, we cannot predict such thing as the Great Leap Forward in 1958, we can't predict such thing as Red Guard purge in 1966, as if there was struggle of sea monsters going on, deep deep beneath the surface of our vision, only bubbles come to the surface, to tell us terrible struggle, we don't know what the struggle is about."

== Critical reception ==
While the film won an Emmy Award in the documentary category soon after its release, contemporary critics have criticized his "callous and condescending" portrayal of Chinese. Film Threat remarked that White never attempted to take on board the Chinese viewpoint, and points out there were unconfirmed rumors that the CIA was involved in the film's making.

== See also ==
- List of American films of 1967
