= Back to 1942 =

- Theatrical release poster

Chinese name
- Traditional Chinese: 一九四二
- Simplified Chinese: 一九四二
Transcriptions
Standard Mandarin
- Hanyu Pinyin: Yī Jǐu Sì Èr
- Directed by: Feng Xiaogang
- Written by: Liu Zhenyun
- Produced by: Chen Kuo-fu; Wang Zhonglei
- Starring: Zhang Guoli; Chen Daoming; Li Xuejian; Zhang Hanyu; Fan Wei; Feng Yuanzheng; Xu Fan; Adrien Brody; Tim Robbins
- Cinematography: Lü Yue
- Edited by: Xiao Yang
- Music by: Zhao Jiping
- Production company: Huayi Brothers
- Release date: 29 November 2012
- Running time: 146 minutes
- Country: China
- Languages: Mandarin; English; Japanese
- Budget: ¥210 million
- Box office: ¥364 million

Back to 1942 is a 2012 Chinese historical drama film directed by Feng Xiaogang. It is based on Liu Zhenyun's novel Remembering 1942, and is about a major famine in Henan, China, during the Second Sino-Japanese War. On 11 November 2012, the film premiered at the International Rome Film Festival. The film was selected as the Chinese entry for the Best Foreign Language Film at the 86th Academy Awards, but was not nominated.

== Plot ==
The film is set in Henan, China in the winter of 1942 during the Second Sino-Japanese War. Master Fan is a wealthy landlord in a village in Henan. When the village is suffering from famine, Fan still has plenty of food to feed his family and the villagers. A group of bandits come and rob the village, eventually burning it down to the ground. Fan's son dies in the process of stopping the bandits.

Fan flees his hometown with his daughter, wife and daughter-in-law. They are accompanied by a servant, Shuanzhu. While they are fleeing to the west, they meet Xialu, a fellow villager, and the latter's family. They decide to travel together, but Fan's food supply and money are stolen by NRA soldiers amidst the chaos caused by Japanese bombing.

Brother Sim insists on preaching the Catholic faith in the starving province. After surviving a few Japanese bombings and witnessing many innocent people dying, he takes refuge under Father Megan but starts doubting the presence of God.

Meanwhile, Time correspondent Theodore H. White treks to Henan to investigate the famine. He discovers that while people are dying every day and some have even resorted to cannibalism, the Nationalist government is still not doing anything to help the refugees. Chiang Kai-shek even wants to give up defending Henan, leaving the refugees to the Japanese. White's report is eventually published in Time, causing the Nationalist government to make a U-turn on their policy. However, when relief supplies are being distributed in the province, the local officials and soldiers start fighting over who should receive a larger share.

The plight of Master Fan continues as his family members die one by one. He is eventually forced to sell his daughter into prostitution in return for food. Losing hope on life, he heads back to the east in the hope of dying somewhere near his home. On his way back, he meets a little girl who has just lost her mother. He adopts the girl as his granddaughter and they continue their journey.

== Cast ==
- Zhang Guoli as Master Fan
- Chen Daoming as Chiang Kai-shek
- Li Xuejian as Li Peiji
- Zhang Hanyu as Brother Sim
- Fan Wei as Ma
- Feng Yuanzheng as Xialu
- Xu Fan as Huazhi
- Adrien Brody as Theodore H. White
- Tim Robbins as Bishop Megan
- Yao Jingyi as Lingdang
- Peng Jiale as Liubao
- Li Qian as Master Fan's daughter-in-law
- Yuan Huifang as Master Fan's wife
- Zhang Shaohua as Xialu's mother
- Wang Ziwen as Master Fan's daughter Xingxing
- Zhang Mo as Shuanzhu
- Zhao Yi as Master Fan's son
- Zhang Shu as Dong Jiayao
- Tian Xiaojie as middle-aged officer
- Ke Lan as Soong Mei-ling
- Zhang Guoqiang as Dong Yingbin
- Yu Zhen as Jiang Dingwen
- Chang Chen-kuang as Zhang Lisheng
- Lin Yongjian as County Magistrate Yue
- Duan Yihong as Chen Bulei
- Peter Noel Duhamel as Joseph Stilwell
- James A. Beattle as Clarence E. Gauss
- Luo Yang as Soong Ching-ling
- Qiao Zhenyu as Secretary Han
- Li Xiaozhou as Sun Ciwei
- Zhang Jie as Li Peiji's secretary
- Nathaniel Boyd as American embassy translator
- Chen Yusheng as Fang Ce
- Hao Jianmin as Zhang Guangyu
- Yu Genyi as Lu Daping
- Zhang Dongsheng as Luo Zhen
- Jiang Yanming as Luo Wu
- Zhang Zhijian as Zhang Fang
- Lü Zhong as Zhang Fang's mother
- Jie Bing as Li Fukuan
- Yasuyuki Hirata as Yasuji Okamura
- Kenichi Miura as Jirou Takahashi

Alec Su's scenes as T. V. Soong were deleted in the final cut of the film.

== Reception ==
Back to 1942 received mixed reviews. It has a 40% approval rating on the review aggregator website Rotten Tomatoes, based on 10 reviews with an average rating of 5.2/10. Metacritic gave the film a score of 41/100 based on six reviews.

Xan Brooks of The Guardian wrote:

Back to 1942 ... gives us history written in banner headlines and trumpeted by bugles. If it could bring itself to quieten down, it might be more successful.

Dan Fainaru of Screen Daily wrote:

An imposing, technically sophisticated achievement, Back To 1942 (Yi Jiu Si Er) covers a lot of ground and deals with a large cast of characters, but somehow, as if to confirm the old saying that one man dying is a tragedy but a million deaths is a statistic figure, it is rather the size of his film and the dexterity that went into its making which will affect Western audiences more than its contents.

Giovanni Vimercati of the China Internet Information Center wrote:

Compared to your average CGI-inflated blockbuster, "Back to 1942" scores in its meticulous attention to detail — everything from costumes to make-up do not shy away from displaying its generous budget. However, despite investing considerable creative energy and capital in the representation of hunger and deprivation, the film fails to convey human suffering on an emotional level. It will be very interesting to see how the film performs on American screens since hunger, in Hollywood as well as in modern China, is a taboo almost on a par with sex.

Daniel Eagan of Film Journal wrote:

Clearly a huge undertaking, the film is a relatively even-handed account of a famine which killed three million people. But the storytelling in Back to 1942 is so careful that it fails to build much interest or emotion.

Neil Genzlinger of The New York Times wrote:

The film uses all the techniques familiar from other depictions of mass migration and suffering to try to bring the catastrophe down to a graspable scale, but it’s not terribly effective at humanizing its characters. It catalogs agony without making you feel it.

== Awards ==
The film won the A.I.C. Award for Best Cinematography during its premiere at the International Rome Film Festival in November 2012, and the Golden Butterfly Award.

The movie won both Best Feature Film Award and Visual Effects Award at the 13th Beijing International Film Festival in 2013.

It also won the Best Film of Mainland and Taiwan at the 32nd Hong Kong Film Awards in 2013.

== See also ==
- Chinese famine of 1942-43
- List of Chinese submissions for the Academy Award for Best Foreign Language Film
- List of submissions to the 86th Academy Awards for Best Foreign Language Film
