= Edgar Snow =

American journalist (1905–1972)

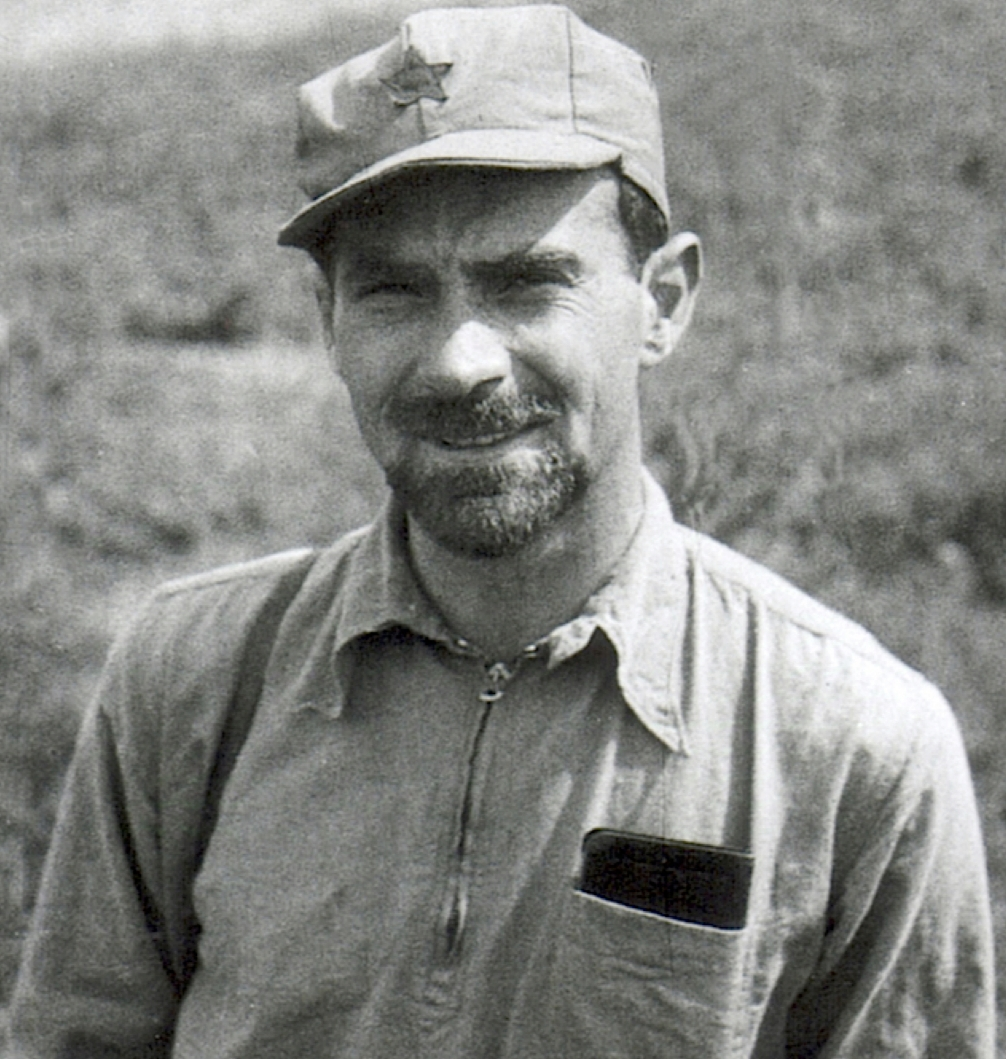
- Snow in 1936
- Born: July 19, 1905; Kansas City, Missouri, U.S.
- Died: February 15, 1972 (aged 66); Eysins, Switzerland
- Education: University of Missouri; Columbia University Graduate School of Journalism
- Occupations: Journalist; Author
- Known for: Chinese journalism, Red Star Over China
- Spouse(s): Helen Foster Snow (m. 1932; div. 1949) Lois Wheeler Snow (m. 1949)
- Children: David Christopher Snow, Jennifer Sian Snow (with Lois Wheeler Snow)

Edgar Parks Snow (July 19, 1905 – February 15, 1972) was an American journalist known for his books and articles on communism in China and the Chinese Communist Revolution. He was the first Western journalist to give an account of the history of the Chinese Communist Party following the Long March, and he was also the first Western journalist to interview many of its leaders, including Mao Zedong. He is best known for his book Red Star Over China (1937), an account of the Chinese Communist movement from its foundation until the late 1930s.

== Background ==
Edgar Parks Snow was born on July 19, 1905, in Kansas City, Missouri. Before settling in Missouri, his ancestors had moved to the state from North Carolina, Kentucky, and Kansas. He briefly studied journalism at the University of Missouri, and joined the Zeta Phi chapter of the Beta Theta Pi fraternity.

== Career ==
Snow moved to New York City to pursue a career in advertising before graduating. He made a little money in the stock market shortly before the Wall Street crash of 1929. In 1928 he used the money to travel around the world, intending to write about his travels.

=== China ===
Snow arrived in Shanghai that summer and stayed in China for thirteen years. He quickly found work with the China Weekly Review, edited by J.B. Powell, a graduate of the Missouri School of Journalism. He became friends with prominent writers and intellectuals, including Soong Ching-ling, the widow of Sun Yat-sen and an advocate of reform. During his early years in China, he supported Chiang Kai-shek, noting that Chiang had more Harvard graduates in his cabinet than there were in Franklin Roosevelt's.

He travelled to India in 1931 with an introduction letter to Nehru from Agnes Smedley, an American left-wing journalist living in China. He delivered it in Mumbai and Sarojini Naidu introduced him to her Communist sister Suhasini, who took him around to see mill workers. He met Gandhi in Simla, but was not impressed. He covered the Meerut conspiracy case trial in which three British communists were involved, and wrote three articles about India.

He began to make an international name for himself when he became correspondent for the Saturday Evening Post and widely traveled throughout China, often on assignment for the Chinese Railway Ministry. He toured famine districts in Northwest China, visited what would later become the Burma Road, and reported on the Japanese invasion of Manchuria.

In 1932, he married Helen Foster, a US Consulate employee who later had a career in journalism. She and Snow decided upon the pen-name "Nym Wales" for her professional work. In 1933, after a honeymoon in Japan, Snow and his wife moved to Beijing. They taught journalism part-time at Yenching University, and studied Chinese, becoming modestly fluent. In addition to writing a book on Japanese aggression in China, Far Eastern Front, he also edited a collection of modern Chinese short stories (translated into English), Living China. They borrowed works on current affairs from the Yenching library and read the principal texts of Marxism. The couple became acquainted with student leaders of the anti-Japanese December 9th Movement. It was through their contacts in the underground communist network that Snow was invited to visit Mao Zedong's headquarters.

=== Red Star Over China ===
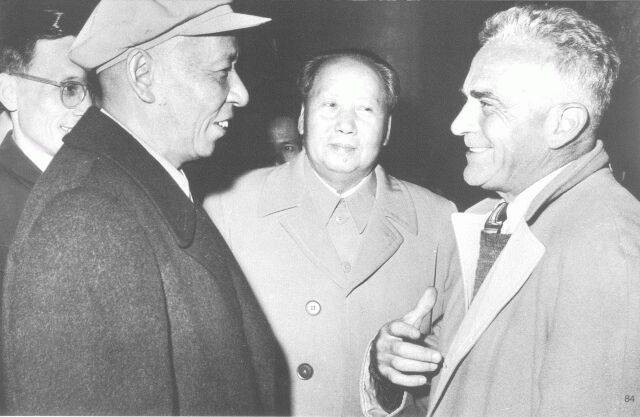
Edgar Snow with Mao Zedong and Liu Shaoqi in Beijing in 1960.

In June 1936, Snow left home with a letter of introduction from Soong Ching-ling (who was a politically important supporter of the Communists) and arrived at Xi'an. The Communist-held areas were blockaded by Zhang Xueliang's army, which had been forced out of his Manchurian base when the Japanese invaded in 1931, Zhang and his followers wanted to work with the Communists in order to oppose the Japanese and allowed Snow to enter. Snow was accompanied by George Hatem, who had worked with the Party, whose presence on the trip Snow did not mention for many years at Hatem's request. Snow had been preparing to write a book about the Communist movement in China, and had even signed a contract at one point. However, his most important contribution was the interviews that he had conducted with the top leaders of the party. When Snow wrote, there were no reliable reports reaching the West about the Communist-controlled areas. Other writers, such as Agnes Smedley, had written in some detail about the Chinese Communists before the Long March, but none of these writers had visited them or even conducted interviews with the leadership which had emerged during the Long March.

Snow was taken through the military quarantine lines to the Communist headquarters at Bao'an, where he spent four months (until October 1936) interviewing Mao and other Communist leaders. He was greeted by crowds of cadets and troops who shouted slogans of welcome, and Snow later recalled "the effect pronounced upon me was highly emotional." Over a period spanning ten days, Mao Zedong met with Snow and narrated his autobiography. Although Snow did not know it at the time, party leadership carefully prepared Mao for these interviews and edited Snow's drafts. Snow claimed that he had been under no constraint, but made revisions in the book at the request of Mao, Zhou Enlai, and perhaps American communists who worried that Mao was creating splits in the International movement.

After he returned to Beijing in the fall, Snow wrote frantically. First he published a short account in China Weekly Review, then a series quickly translated into Chinese. Red Star Over China, published first in London in 1937, was an immediate best-seller. The book is given credit for introducing both Chinese and foreign readers not so much to the Communist Party, which was reasonably well known, but to Mao Zedong. Mao was not, as had been reported, dead. Snow reported that Mao was a sincere communist, a patriot committed to resisting the Japanese invasion and world-wide fascism, and a political reformer, not the purely military or radical revolutionary that he had been during the 1920s.

In the first four weeks after its publication, Red Star over China sold over 12,000 copies, and it effectively made Snow world-famous. The book quickly became a "standard" introduction to the early Communist movement in China. His literary agent in Japan, Yoko Matsuoka translated the book, as well as many of his other works, into Japanese.

=== China during World War II ===
After the Japanese invasion of China in 1937, the Snows became founding members of the Chinese Industrial Cooperative Association (Indusco). The goal of Indusco was to establish workers' cooperatives in areas which were not controlled by the Japanese, through which Chinese workers would be provided with steady employment, education, consumer and industrial goods, and the opportunity to manage their own farms and factories. Snow's work in Indusco mainly involved his chairmanship of the Membership and Propaganda Committee, which managed public and financial support. Indusco was eventually successful in creating 1,850 workers' cooperatives. Snow again visited Mao in Yan'an in 1939.

Snow reported on the Nanking Massacre (December 1937 to February 1938), and he even reported on Japanese reactions to it, stating:

In Shanghai a few Japanese deeply felt the shame and the humiliation. I remember, for example, talking one evening to a Japanese friend, a liberal-minded newspaper man who survived by keeping his views to himself, and whose name I withhold for his own protection. "Yes, they are all true," he unexpectedly admitted when I asked him about some atrocity reports, "only the facts are actually worse than any story yet published." There were tears in his eyes and I took his sorrow to be genuine.

His report on the Nanking Massacre appeared in his 1941 book Scorched Earth.

Snow met Wataru Kaji, and his wife, Yuki Ikeda. Both Kaji and Ikeda survived a Japanese bombing attack on Wuchang and met him at the Hankow Navy YMCA. Snow met them again a year later in Chongqing and he was reminded that:

Japan was full of decent people like them who, if they had not had their craniums stuffed full of Sun goddess myths and other imperialist filth, and been forbidden access to 'dangerous thoughts,' and been armed by American and British hypocrites, could easily live in a civilized co-operative world if any of us could provide one.

His time reporting on the Second Sino-Japanese War would appear in his 1941 book "The Battle For Asia".

=== Later journalism ===
Shortly before the United States entered World War II, in 1941, Snow toured Japanese-occupied areas of Asia and wrote his second major book, Battle for Asia, about his observations. After writing the book, Snow and his wife returned to the United States, where they separated. In April 1942, the Saturday Evening Post sent him abroad as a war correspondent. Snow traveled to India, China, and Russia to report on World War II from the perspectives of those countries. In Russia he shared his observations of the Battle of Stalingrad with the American Embassy. At times, Snow's defenses of various undemocratic Allied governments were denounced as blatant war propaganda, not neutral journalistic observation, but Snow defended his reporting, stating:

In this international cataclysm brought on by fascists it is no more possible for any people to remain neutral than it is for a man surrounded by bubonic plague to remain 'neutral' toward the rat population. Whether you like it or not, your life as a force is bound either to help the rats or hinder them. Nobody can be immunized against the germs of history.

By 1944, Snow was wavering on the question of whether Mao and the Chinese Communists were actually "agrarian democrats," rather than dedicated communists who were bent on totalitarian rule. His 1944 book, People on Our Side, emphasized their role in the fight against fascism. In a speech, he described Mao and the Communist Chinese as a progressive force which desired a democratic, free China. Writing for The Nation, Snow stated that the Chinese Communists "happen to have renounced, years ago now, any intention of establishing communism [in China] in the near future." After the war, Snow retreated from the view that the Chinese communists were a democratic movement.

While working as a correspondent in Russia, he wrote three short books about Russia's role both in World War II and world affairs: People on Our Side (1944); The Pattern of Soviet Power (1945); and, Stalin Must Have Peace (1947).

In 1949, Snow divorced Foster and married his second wife, Lois Wheeler. They had a son, Christopher (born 1949) who died of cancer in October 2008, and a daughter, Sian (born 1951), named after the Chinese city Sian (now Xi'an), who lives and works as a translator and editor in the Geneva region, not far from where her mother lived for many years prior to her death in 2018.

=== McCarthyism, exile ===
Because of his relationships with communists and because of his highly favorable treatment of them when he was a war correspondent, Snow became an object of suspicion after World War II. During the McCarthy period, he was questioned by the FBI and he was also asked to disclose the extent of his relationship with the Communist Party. In published articles, Snow lamented about what he saw as the one-sided, conservative, and anti-communist mood in the United States. Later in the 1950s, he published two more books about China: Random Notes on Red China (1957), a collection of previously unused China material which was of interest to China scholars; and Journey to the Beginning (1958), an autobiographical account of his experiences in China before 1949. During the 1950s, Snow found it difficult to make a living through his writing, and he decided to leave the United States. He and his wife moved to Switzerland in 1959, but he remained an American citizen.

=== Visits to China ===
He returned to China in 1960 and 1964, conducting interviews with both Mao Zedong and Zhou Enlai, traveled extensively, and talked to many locals. His 1963 book, The Other Side of the River, details his experience, including his reasons for denying that China's 1959–1961 Great Leap Forward was a famine. In 1963, his new book was reviewed in The Sydney Morning Herald which referred to his association with Rewi Alley, a New Zealander who by then was "the Chinese Government's chief propagandist in English."

In 1970, he – this time with his wife, Lois Wheeler Snow – made a final trip to China. On October 1, he stood next to Mao during the National Day parade in Beijing, the first time an American was given that honor. In December 1970, Mao Zedong called Snow to his office one morning before dawn for an informal talk lasting over five hours, during which Mao told Snow that he would welcome Richard Nixon to China either as a tourist or in his official capacity as President of the United States. Snow reached an agreement with Time magazine to publish his final interview with Mao, including the Nixon invitation, provided the earlier interview with Zhou Enlai was also published. The White House followed this visit with interest but distrusted Snow and his pro-communist reputation. When Snow came down with pancreatic cancer and returned home after a surgery, Zhou Enlai dispatched a team of Chinese doctors to Switzerland, including George Hatem.

== Death ==
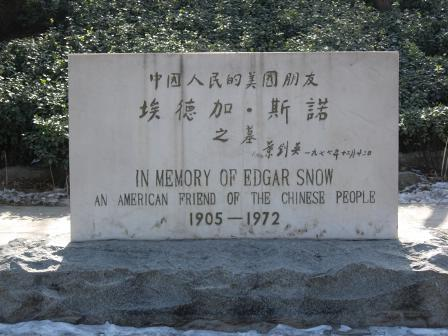
Half of Edgar Snow's ashes are buried on the campus of Peking University, Beijing, alongside Weiming Lake.

Snow died on February 15, 1972, the week President Richard Nixon was traveling to China, before he could see the normalization of relations. He died of cancer, at the age of 66, at his home in Eysins near Nyon, Vaud, Switzerland. After his death, his ashes were divided into two parts at his request. One half was buried at Sneden's Landing, near the Hudson River. The other half was buried on the grounds of Peking University, which had taken over the campus of Yenching University, where he had taught in the 1930s. His final book, The Long Revolution, was published posthumously by Lois Wheeler Snow.

In 1973 Lois Wheeler Snow went to China to bury half of her husband's ashes in the garden of Peking University. In 2000 – together with her son Chris – she traveled to Beijing in support of women who lost their children in the Tiananmen Square massacre of 1989. One of these mothers was under house arrest and refused visits by others, while another was arrested after receiving financial assistance from Wheeler Snow. Wheeler Snow issued statements of protest to the international press and threatened to remove her husband's remains from Chinese soil. In her letter to the Chinese ambassador in Geneva, Wheeler Snow expressed her wish that the people of China be liberated from oppression, corruption and misuse of power – just as she and her husband had expressed in 1949.

== Evaluation by China scholars ==
Snow's reporting from China in the 1930s has been both praised as prescient and blamed for the rise of Mao's communism. Some Chinese historians have judged Snow's writing very positively. John K. Fairbank praised Snow's reporting for giving the West the first articulate account of the Chinese Communist Party and its leadership, which he called "disastrously prophetic." Writing thirty years after the first publication of Red Star Over China, Fairbank stated that the book had "stood the test of time... both as a historical record and as an indication of a trend." Fairbank agrees that Snow was used by Mao, but defended Snow against the allegation that he was blinded by Chinese hospitality and charm, insisting that "Snow did what he could as a professional journalist."

Other historians have been more critical of Snow. Jung Chang and Jon Halliday's anti-communist biography Mao: The Unknown Story, describes Snow as a Mao spokesman and accuses him of supplying myths, asserting that he lost his objectivity to such an extent that he presented a romanticized view of communist China.

Jonathan Mirsky, a critical voice, stated that what Snow did in the 1930s was "to describe the Chinese Communists before anyone else, and thus score a world-class scoop." Of his reporting in 1960, however, he says that Snow "went much further than those who reckoned that Mao and his comrades would take power." He contented himself with assurances from Zhou Enlai and Mao Zedong that while there was a food problem, it was being dealt with successfully," which "was not true", and "had Snow still been the reporter he had been in the 1930s he would have discovered it."

In Mao: A Reinterpretation, a work sympathetic to Mao, Lee Feigon criticizes Snow's account for its inaccuracies, but praises Red Star for being "[the] seminal portrait of Mao" and relies on Snow's work as a critical reference throughout the book.

== Works ==
- Far Eastern Front. H. Smith & R. Haas, New York, 1933.
- Living China: Modern Chinese Short Stories. 1937. Harrap, London
- Red Star Over China (various editions, London, New York, 1937–1944). Reprinted Read Books, 2006, ISBN 978-1-4067-9821-0; Hesperides Press, 2008, ISBN 978-1-4437-3673-2.
- Scorched Earth. Gollancz, London, 1941. Published in the US as The Battle for Asia. New York, Random House. 1941.
- People on Our Side. 1948. Random House, 1944.
- The Pattern of Soviet Power. Random House, 1945.
- Stalin Must Have Peace. Random House, 1947.
- Journey to the Beginning. Random House, 1958.
- China, Russia, and the U.S.A.: Changing Relations in a Changing World. Marzani & Munsell, New York, 1962.
- The Other Side of the River: Red China Today. Random House. 1962. Gollancz, London, 1963.
  - New edition: Red China Today: The Other Side of the River (with a new Preface: China in the 70s). Penguin Books. 1970. ISBN 0-14-021159-4.
  - Red China Today: Revised and updated version of The Other Side of the River. New York: Vintage Books. 1971. ISBN 9780394716817.
- Random Notes on Red China 1936–1945. East Asian Research Center, Harvard University, Cambridge, MA, 1968.
- The Long Revolution. Random House, 1972
- Farnsworth, Robert H., ed. (1991). Edgar Snow's Journey South of the Clouds. Columbia: University of Missouri Press. ISBN 9780826207777.

== References and further reading ==
- Hamilton, John M. (2009) Journalism's Roving Eye: A History of American Foreign Reporting. Louisiana State University Press.
- Dimond, E. Grey. Ed Snow Before Paoan: The Shanghai Years. Diastole Hospital Hill, Inc., University of Missouri–Kansas City, 1985.
- Farnsworth, Robert. Edgar Snow's Journey South of the Clouds. Columbia: University of Missouri Press, 1991.
- Farnsworth, Robert. From Vagabond to Journalist: Edgar Snow in Asia 1928–1941. Columbia: University of Missouri Press, 1996.
- French, Paul. Through the Looking Glass: Foreign Journalists in China, from the Opium Wars to Mao. Hong Kong University Press, 2009.
- Hamilton, John Maxwell (2003). Edgar Snow: A Biography (revised ed.). Baton Rouge: Louisiana State University Press. ISBN 0807129127.
- Mirsky, Jonathan. "Message from Mao", New York Review (February 16, 1985): 15–17. Review.
- Shewmaker, Kenneth E., Americans and Chinese Communists, 1927–1945: A Persuading Encounter, Ithaca, NY: Cornell University Press (1971) ISBN 0-8014-0617-X
- Snow, Edgar. Journey to the Beginning. New York: Random House, 1958. Memoir.
- Snow, Lois Wheeler. Edgar Snow's China – A personal account of the Chinese Revolution compiled from the writings of Edgar Snow. Random House, New York, 1981. ISBN 0-394-50954-4
- Thomas, S. Bernard (1996), Season of High Adventure: Edgar Snow in China, Berkeley: University of California Press
- Entell, Peter (2012). "A Home Far Away". Show and Tell Films.
