= Red Star Over China =

1937 book by Edgar Snow

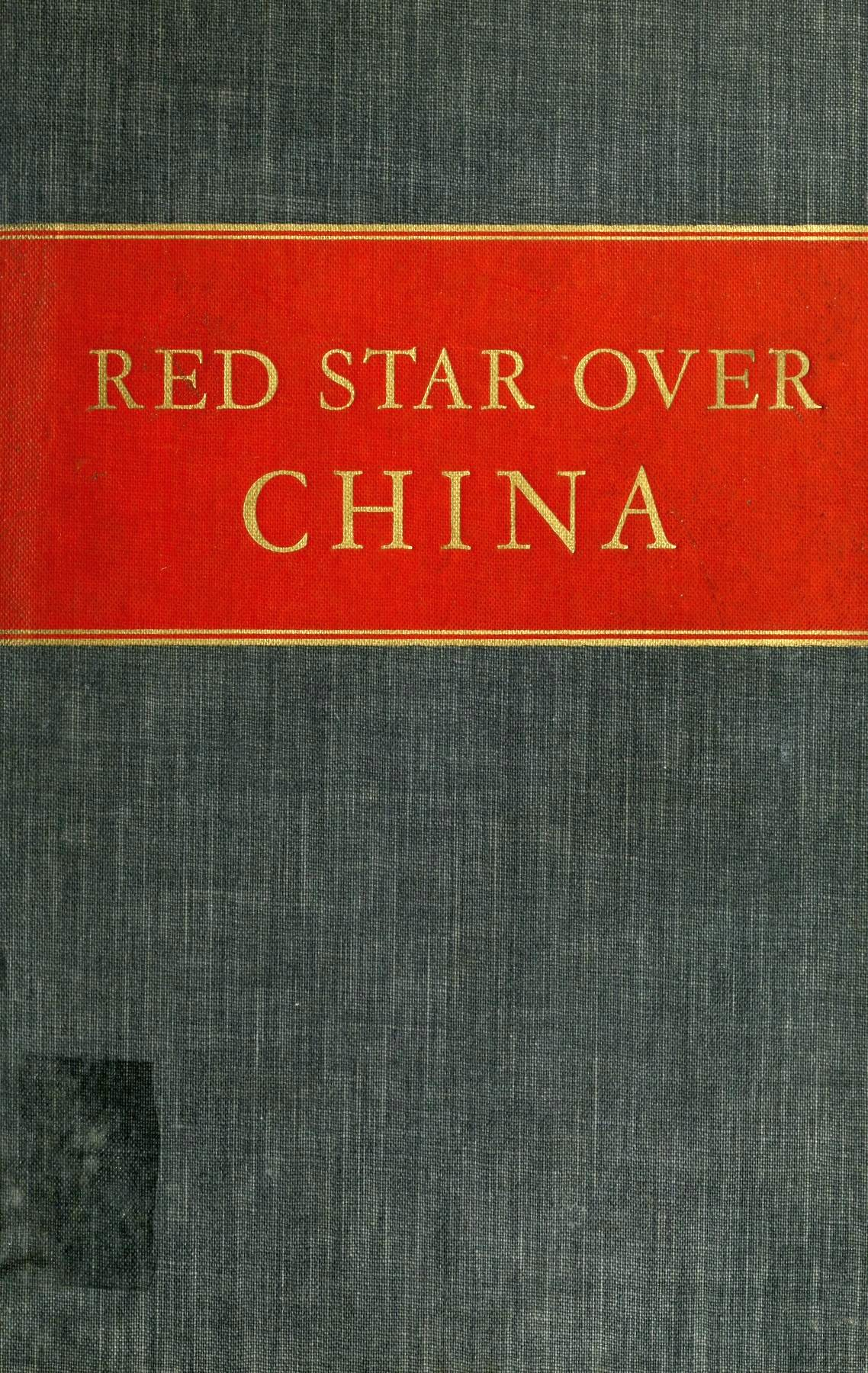
- Cover art of the first edition
- Author: Edgar Snow
- Language: English
- Subject: The Chinese Communist Party on the eve of the Second Sino-Japanese War
- Published: 1937
- Publisher: Victor Gollancz Ltd (London; UK), Random House (New York; US)
- Publication place: UK (October 1937); US (January 1938)
- English publication date: 1937
- Pages: 474

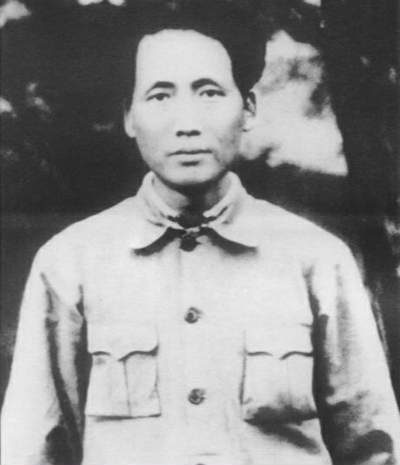
Mao Zedong in 1931

Red Star Over China is a 1937 book by Edgar Snow based on his visit on the eve of the Second Sino-Japanese War to areas controlled by the Chinese Communist Party (CCP), when it was largely obscure to Westerners. The book made an impact on public opinion in China when it was quickly translated into Chinese, and along with Pearl S. Buck's The Good Earth (1931), it was the most influential book on Western understanding of China in the 1930s.

== Overview ==
In Red Star Over China, Edgar Snow recounts the months that he spent with the Chinese Red Army in 1936. Most of this time, he was at their then-capital Bao'an (Pao An). They moved to the famous Yan'an only after he left.

Snow used his extensive interviews with Mao and the other top leaders to present vivid descriptions of the Long March, as well as biographical accounts of leaders on both sides of the conflicts, including Zhou Enlai, Peng Dehuai, Lin Biao, He Long, and Mao Zedong's own account of his life.

When Snow wrote, there were no reliable reports reaching the West about what was going on in the communist-controlled areas. Other writers, such as Agnes Smedley, had written in some detail about the Chinese Communists before the Long March, but none of these writers had ever visited them or even conducted first hand interviews with them. Snow's status as an international journalist not previously identified with the communist movement gave his reports the stamp of authenticity. The glowing pictures of life in the communist areas contrasted with the gloom and corruption of the Kuomintang government. Many Chinese learned about Mao and the communist movement from the almost immediate translations of Mao's biography, and readers in North America and Europe, especially those with liberal views, were heartened to learn of a movement which they interpreted as being anti-fascist and progressive.

Snow's Preface to the revised edition in 1968 describes the book's original context:

The Western powers, in self-interest, were hoping for a miracle in China. They dreamed of a new birth of nationalism that would keep Japan so bogged down that she would never be able to turn upon the Western colonies—her true objective. Red Star Over China tended to show that the Chinese Communists could indeed provide that nationalist leadership needed for effective anti-Japanese resistance. How dramatically the United States' policy-making attitudes have altered since then ... It provided not only for non-Chinese readers, but also for the entire Chinese people—including all but the Communist leaders themselves—the first authentic account of the Chinese Communist Party and the first connected story of their long struggle to carry through the most thoroughgoing social revolution in China's three millenniums of history. Many editions were published in China ...

When it was published in China, it became viewed as a milestone because it was the first Western journalism account of the CCP and the Chinese Red Army. Taking inspiration from the book, thousands of young people joined the CCP's efforts, including many who went to Yan'an. Japanese occupying forces sought to carry out censorship of the book, including engaging in torture in an effort to find the book's Chinese publisher. Red Star over China and Snow's other works were banned in areas of China controlled by the Chinese Nationalists.

== Publishing history ==
Red Star appeared first in Britain, published by Victor Gollancz as a Left Book Club title. The publication of the book in October 1937 coincided with the Battle of Shanghai, which drove public interest in what was happening in China. Within a month of its British release, the book had been through three reprints and the Left Book Club had sold around 100,000 copies. In the United States, the Random House edition had considerably lower total sales of 23,500. The February 1938 Random House edition added Chapter 13, "The Shadow of the Rising Sun". This chapter describes the CCP's guerilla war efforts.

Snow was not available to read proofs of the initial London and New York editions, but he revised the text of the 1939 and 1944 editions. The Publisher's Note of the 1939 edition explains that Snow added a "substantial new section" of six chapters to include the Xi'an Incident, bringing the narrative up to July 1938 as well as "many textual changes." Snow made the textual changes partly to polish but he also responded to friends and reviewers. Some of them felt Snow's account of CCP history had been too critical of Soviet policy, and others felt that he had given too much credit to Mao for independent Chinese strategies. Snow toned down but did not remove the implicit criticisms of Stalin.

Because a Chinese commercial publisher willing to take the risk of publishing the text could not be found, in 1938 the CCP established Fushe Press to translate and publish Red Star over China.

The 1944 Modern Library edition sold 27,000 copies. The 1944 edition was allowed to go out of print in the 1950s, but Snow made substantial revisions and annotations for the Grove Press reprint of 1968.

In 1949, two new Chinese editions were published in Shanghai. These included the thirteenth chapter added to the 1938 English Random House edition.

Two new major Chinese editions were published in December 1979. An edition by People's Publishing House was titled Mao Zedong's 1936 Conversations with Edgar Snow. The other, published by SDX Joint Publishing Company and translated by Dong Leshan, included a previously omitted chapter on Comintern advisor Otto Braun (Li De).

The text was translated into more than 20 languages.

== Assessments and criticisms ==
The book has been called a "journalistic scoop" and a "historical classic", and the scholar Julia Lovell is among those who argue that the book played a key role in creating Chinese support and Western approval of Mao. Mao himself commented that the book "had merit no less than Great Yu controlling the floods".

American historian Owen Lattimore wrote that Red Star over China "rose like fireworks, breaking through the twilight ... there was another China, after all!" Pearl S. Buck contended, "Every page of this extraordinary record is filled with significance." Time magazine compared Snow's reporting to be akin to Columbus discovering the new world. U.S. President Franklin D. Roosevelt read the book and invited Snow to the White House three different times to hear his views on supporting China in the Second Sino-Japanese War.

Mao Zedong's biographers, Jung Chang and Jon Halliday, wrote that Snow probably believed what he was told to be true, and much of it is still of basic significance, especially the "Autobiography of Mao". But they are severely critical of Snow and also wrote that Mao omitted key elements from his accounts of party history and Snow missed others. The scholar Anne-Marie Brady found that Snow submitted the transcripts of his interviews to be edited and approved by CCP officials and made changes in the American edition in response to the Communist Party of the United States. Snow's account of the Long March, for instance has been criticised by some, while others have maintained that it is basically valid.

In his 1966 biography of Mao, the American Sinologist Stuart R. Schram wrote that Red Star Over China was irreplaceable in learning about Mao's early years and that despite "many errors of detail", it remains "by far the most important single source regarding his life" and offered important insights into "Mao's own vision of his past". John K. Fairbank praised Snow's reporting for giving the West the first articulate account of the Chinese Communist Party and its leadership, which he called "disastrously prophetic". Writing thirty years after the first publication of Red Star Over China, Fairbank stated that the book had "stood the test of time... both as a historical record and as an indication of a trend." Fairbank agrees that Snow was used by Mao, but defended Snow against the allegation that he was blinded by Chinese hospitality and charm, insisting that "Snow did what he could as a professional journalist." In Mao: A Reinterpretation, a work sympathetic to Mao, Lee Feigon criticizes Snow's account for its inaccuracies, but praises Red Star for being "[the] seminal portrait of Mao" and relies on Snow's work as a critical reference throughout the book.

== See also ==
- Anna Louise Strong
- Dwarkanath Kotnis
- Jack Belden
- Norman Bethune
- Rewi Alley
- Helen Foster Snow
- Thunder Out of China
