= The Making of the President 1960 =

1961 book by Theodore H. White

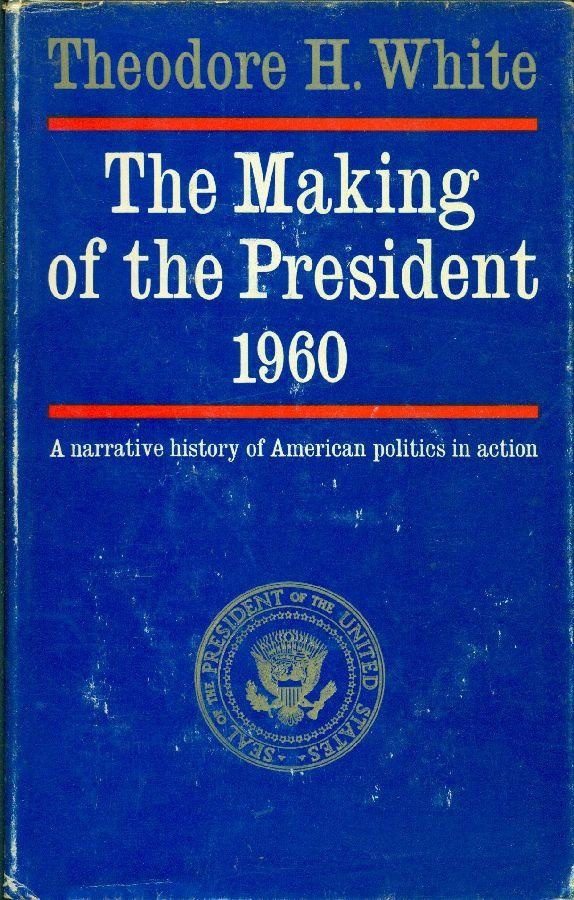
- First edition
- Author: Theodore H. White
- Subject: 1960 United States presidential election John F. Kennedy
- Genre: Political science
- Publisher: Atheneum Publishers
- Publication date: 1961
- Media type: Book
- Pages: 400
- ISBN: 9780061900600
- Dewey Decimal: 324.9730921
- LC Class: E840 .W5

The Making of the President 1960, written by journalist Theodore H. White and published by Atheneum Publishers in 1961, is a book that recounts and analyzes the 1960 election in which John F. Kennedy was elected President of the United States. The book won the 1962 Pulitzer Prize for General Nonfiction and was the first in a series of books by White about American presidential elections. (The others are The Making of the President 1964 (1965), The Making of the President 1968 (1969), and The Making of the President 1972 (1973).)

The book traces the 1960 campaign from the primaries (in which Kennedy faced Minnesota Senator Hubert Humphrey and Missouri Senator Stuart Symington) to the conclusion of the general election contest against Richard Nixon. Much of the narrative is written in an almost novelistic style, describing politicians' looks, voices and personalities; but it also contains thought-provoking discussions of various trends in American life and politics.

The Making of the President 1960 was a huge success, staying on the best-seller list for more than 40 weeks. Critics and journalists hailed it as a new way of looking at its subject. It had a huge impact on political reporting and even on American politics itself. As White noted, it was an up-close look at a leader under the pressure of circumstances. Its literary-journalistic approach brought a dramatic point of view on the world of politics and its strategies, victories and defeats. One chapter was devoted to detailing the reasons behind Americans' ways of voting and ways of life.

White's book, and its successor volumes, inspired a trend toward the production of campaign books and toward a more personality-driven approach to political reporting. White in later years would bemoan the changes he had helped create.

David L. Wolper produced a film version of The Making of the President 1960, which was finished shortly before President Kennedy's November 1963 assassination. It was released without revision.
