= Lois Wheeler Snow =

American actress (1920–2018)

- Born: July 12, 1920; Stockton, California, United States
- Died: April 3, 2018 (aged 97); Nyon, Switzerland
- Occupation: Actress
- Years active: 1943–1959
- Spouse: Edgar Snow (m. 1949; died 1979)
- Children: David Christopher Snow, Jennifer Sian Snow

Lois Wheeler Snow (July 12, 1920 – April 3, 2018) was an American actress who became known for her criticism of abuse of human rights.

== Early years ==
The daughter of Raymond Joseph Wheeler and Katherine Kurtz Wheeler, Snow was born Lois Wheeler on July 12, 1920, in Stockton, California. Her father was Stockton's mayor, and her mother was a homemaker. She remained in Stockton to study drama at the College of the Pacific. While there, she acted with the college's Little Theater troupe and was "a principal ingenue" for two years. She also won the F. Melvyn Lawson Award as the person who "contributed the most to the Little Theater season." Her performance in a college play led to her receiving a scholarship to study at the Neighborhood Playhouse School of the Theatre in New York City—much to her parents' disappointment. She was also one of the Actors Studio's founding members.

== Acting ==
Snow used her acting talent to obtain her first professional role. Although she had graduated from college, she removed her makeup, wore clothing typical of a teenager, and convinced officials at the Theatre Guild that she was a 15-year-old girl from out of town who wanted to act. The result was the desired role in The Innocent Voyage (1943). Her other Broadway credits include The Fifth Season (1953), Dinosaur Wharf (1951), The Young and Fair (1948), All My Sons (1947), Trio (1944), and Pick-up Girl (1944). She acted in the touring company of Dear Ruth as well as in its Broadway production.

She appeared on film in My Foolish Heart (1949). On television, she portrayed nurse Janet Jackson on The Guiding Light from 1954 to 1958.

== Relations with China ==
In 2011, Snow began an essay with the statement, "China became part of my life when I met and married Edgar Snow." She first visited China in 1970 with her husband. The couple received a welcome fit for royalty, appearing publicly with Chairman Mao and meeting First Premier Zhou. That meeting was seen by some people as "a back-channel invitation to President Richard Nixon to visit." Mao and Zhou later sent a medical team to the Snows' home in Switzerland after Edgar Snow's health failed. Following his death, she frequently visited China and stayed friendly with the country's leaders.

A turning point in the Snow-China relationship occurred after the 1989 Tiananmen Square protests. Snow told a reporter that the Communist Party's treatment of protesters "just woke me up." She said that she would never return to the country, and she attempted to leverage her late husband's status in China as she wrote to leaders about the effects of their policies on families. After Snow found out that money she had sent to families of victims of oppression had been confiscated, she broke her vow. In 2000 she went with her son to China, finding a reception much different from her earlier experience. Surveillance followed them, and a group of police officers prevented them from meeting with an activist whose son had been killed during the protests in Tiananmen.

== Blacklisting ==
Allegations of Communist leanings after they were questioned by the FBI led to the Snows' being blacklisted and unable to obtain work in the United States. In 1959, they moved to Switzerland, settling in the Lake Geneva region.

== Personal life ==
She married writer Edgar Snow in May 1949 in Sneden's Landing, New York.

== Death ==
On April 3, 2018, Snow died at a hospital in Nyon, Switzerland, at age 97.
