= Harold C. Hinton =

American academic (1924–1993)

- Born: Harold Clendenin Hinton; 1924; Neuilly-sur-Seine, France
- Died: September 24, 1993 (aged 68); Estes Park, Colorado, United States
- Years active: 1950–1992

Academic background
- Education: Harvard University (PhD)
- Thesis: The Grain Tribute System of China, 1845-1911: An Aspect of the Decline of the Ching Dynasty (1951)
- Doctoral advisor: John King Fairbank

Academic work
- Discipline: Sinology, Foreign relations
- Institutions: Georgetown University, Columbia University, George Washington University

Harold Clendenin Hinton (1924 – September 24, 1993) was an American sinologist and scholar of international relations. Born in France to a New York Times correspondent, he moved with his father to Washington, D.C., where he attended school. His college education at Harvard was interrupted by his service in the Pacific during World War II. After the war, he continued study at Harvard, receiving his PhD in 1946 under the direction of John King Fairbank. He began teaching at Georgetown University, and became one of the first American academics to specialize in the study of the emerging communist government of China. After brief stints at various universities in Washington and New York, he joined the Institute of Sino-Soviet Studies at George Washington University in 1964; during this period he worked as a government advisor on Sino-Soviet relations and an analyst at the Institute for Defense Analyses. He retired in 1992, and died at Estes Park, Colorado in 1993.

== Biography ==
In 1924, Harold Clendenin Hinton was born in Neuilly-sur-Seine, a suburb of Paris. His father, Harold B. Hinton, was a correspondent for The New York Times. After moving to London, Harold B. was recalled to the New York Times office in New York City in 1932. Soon afterwards, the family moved to Washington, D.C., where Hinton attended St. Albans School. He attended prep school at St. Paul's in Concord, New Hampshire, and began study at Harvard College on a scholarship in 1941. This was soon interrupted by the American entrance into World War II; he entered service at Fort Devens in June 1943, and served in the Pacific Theater. He was sent to Korea shortly after the Japanese surrender, and worked as a military historian in Korea and Okinawa Island. After briefly returning to Harvard while on a waiting list to attend the Officers Candidate School at Fort Sill, Oklahoma, he was summoned to the fort, and took exams under the supervision of an army proctor; he graduated Harvard in absentia in 1946.

=== Academic career ===
Hinton left the military in 1946 and continued his studies at Harvard. He was elected to Phi Beta Kappa in 1946, and graduated with his PhD in 1951. His dissertation, The Grain Tribute System of China, 1845-1911, was written under the direction of John King Fairbank and later published by the university as a monograph in 1956. He began an assistant professorship at Georgetown University in 1950, where he founded the university's Asian Studies program. He served as a visiting professor at Cambridge in 1952–1953, where he conducted post-graduate research on a Fulbright Scholarship, and additionally lectured at Oxford. In 1956, he was a visiting professor at Harvard. A staunch anti-communist, he was part of a small group of academics who specialized in the study of Communist China under McCarthyism, where such study was generally discouraged. From 1957 to 1960, he directed Chinese studies at the Foreign Service Institute, succeeding A. Doak Barnett.

Hinton taught at Columbia University from 1960 to 1962, before returning to Washington to teach at Trinity College and the Johns Hopkins School of Advanced International Studies. In 1964, he joined the nascent Institute of Sino-Soviet Studies at George Washington University as an associate professor of political science and international affairs; he was promoted to a full professorship in 1967. During this period, he additionally worked at the Institute for Defense Analyses, where he studied and published analyses of Sino-Soviet relations, and advised the Department of Defense and State Department. During the late 1960s, he was approached by diplomats from the Soviet Embassy to discuss the Sino-Soviet split.

Hinton wrote two influential textbooks on Chinese foreign policy, publishing Communist China in World Politics in 1966 and China's Turbulent Quest in 1970. In 1986, he published the seven-volume handbook series The People's Republic of China: A Documentary Survey. He retired from George Washington University in June 1992, and was granted professor emeritus status. Hinton moved with his wife to Estes Park, Colorado. He worked as a visiting lecturer for the University of Colorado the following spring. Hinton died of a heart attack in Estes Park on September 24, 1993, at the age of 68.

== Bibliography ==
- Hinton, Harold C. (1956). The Grain Tribute System of China, 1845–1911. Harvard University Asia Center.
- ——— (1956). Leaders of Communist China. RAND Corporation.
- ———; Ike, Nobutaka; Palmer, Norman D.; Callard, Keith; Kahin, George McTurnan (1958). Kahnin, George McTurnan (ed.). Major Governments of Asia. Cornell University Press.
- ——— (1966). Communist China in World Politics. Houghton Mifflin.
- ——— (1970). China's Turbulent Quest. Indiana University Press.
- ——— (1971). The Bear at the Gate: Chinese Policy Making Under Soviet Pressure. Hoover Institution.
- ——— (1973). An Introduction to Chinese Politics. Praeger.
- ——— (1975). Three and a Half Powers: The New Balance in Asia. Indiana University Press.
- ——— (1976). Peking-Washington: Chinese Foreign Policy and the United States. Center for Strategic and International Studies.
- ——— (1976). The Sino-Soviet Confrontation: Implications for the Future. Crane, Russak.
- ———; Jansen, Marius B. (1979). Major Topics on China and Japan: A Handbook for Teachers. Greenwood.
- ——— (1980). The China Sea: The American Stake in its Future. National Strategy Information Center.
- ——— (1983). Korea Under New Leadership: The Fifth Republic. Praeger.
- ——— (1986). The People's Republic of China, 1949-1979: A Documentary Survey. Scholarly Resources.

=== As editor ===
- Hinton, Harold C., ed. (1979). The People's Republic of China: A Handbook. Avalon.
