= The Chinese Historical Review =

- Subject: History of China
- Language: English

Publication details
- Former name(s): The Historians; The Chinese Historians
- Publisher: Taylor & Francis
- Frequency: Biannual

Standard abbreviations
- ISO 4: Chin. Hist. Rev.

Indexing
- ISSN: 1547-402X (print); 2048-7827 (web)

Links
- Journal homepage

The Chinese Historical Review is a biannual peer-reviewed academic journal published by Taylor & Francis on behalf of Chinese Historians in the United States. The journal publishes original research on the history of China in every period, China's historical relations with the world, the historical experiences of the overseas Chinese, as well as comparative and transnational studies of history and social sciences. The journal was established in 1987 as The Historians and renamed The Chinese Historians in 1989, obtaining its current name in 2004. The editor-in-chief is Xiaobing Li (University of Central Oklahoma). The journal is abstracted and indexed by Bibliography of Asian Studies and Scopus. The journal has an impact factor of 0.4 (2022).
