= Lee Feigon =

American historian

- Born: Lee Feigon
- Education: University of California, Berkeley, University of Chicago, University of Wisconsin-Madison
- Occupations: Historian, Sinologist
- Known for: Mao: A Reinterpretation

Lee Feigon is an American historian who specialized in the study of 20th-century Chinese history.

In 2002 he published Mao: A Reinterpretation, that sought to highlight what Feigon saw as some positive aspects of Mao Zedong's political leadership (although remaining critical of it). He subsequently used that book as a basis for a documentary, The Passion of the Mao.

He has written for such U.S. publications as The Wall Street Journal, Barron's, The Nation, The Chicago Tribune, The Atlantic, and The Boston Globe.

Title	Year	Publisher	ISBN
China Rising: The Meaning of Tiananmen	1990	Ivan R. Dee	978-0929587301
Chen Duxiu: Founder of the Chinese Communist Party	1992	Princeton University Press	978-0691053936
Demystifying Tibet: Unlocking the Secrets of the Land of the Snows	1995	Ivan R. Dee	978-1566630894
Mao: A Reinterpretation	2002	Ivan R. Dee	978-1566635226
