= Theodore H. White =

American historian and author (1915–1986)

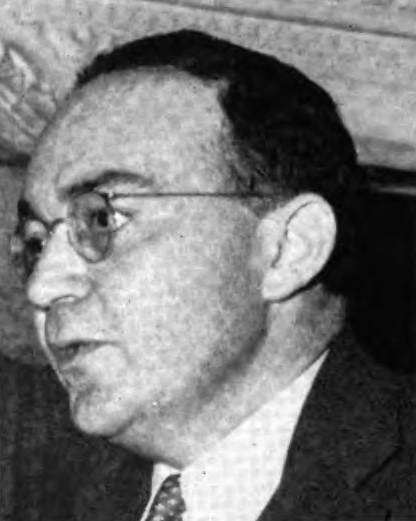
- Born: May 6, 1915; Dorchester, Boston, U.S.
- Died: May 15, 1986 (aged 71); New York City, U.S.
- Education: Harvard College
- Occupations: Journalist, historian
- Spouse(s): Nancy Bean (divorced); Beatrice Kevitt Hofstadter
- Children: Heyden White Rostow, David Fairbank White
- Writing career
- Period: 1940s–1980s
- Genres: Political journalism, history
- Notable awards: Pulitzer Prize for General Nonfiction (1962, for The Making of the President 1960)

Theodore Harold White (Chinese: 白修德, May 6, 1915 – May 15, 1986) was an American political journalist and historian, first known for his 1946 best-seller Thunder Out of China, reporting from China during World War II and then the Making of the President series.

White started his career reporting for Time magazine from wartime China in the 1940s. He was the first foreigner to report on the Chinese famine of 1942–43 and helped to draw international attention to the shortcomings of the Nationalist government. After leaving Time, he reported on post-war Europe for popular magazines in the early 1950s, but lost these assignments because of his association with the "loss of China". He regained national recognition with The Making of the President 1960, whose combination of interviews, on-the-ground reporting, and vivid writing were developed in best-selling accounts of the 1964, 1968, 1972, and 1980 presidential elections, and became a model for later journalists.

== Early life ==
White was born May 6, 1915, in Dorchester, Boston. His parents were David White (born David Vladefsky – a Russian immigrant, he adopted the name "White" from a Boston department store) and Mary Winkeller White. His father was a lawyer. He was raised Jewish, and as a teenager was a member of the socialist-Zionist Hashomer Hatzair youth movement. He was a student at Boston Latin School, from which he graduated in 1932; from there, he went on to Harvard College, from which he graduated with a B.A. in history as a student of John K. Fairbank, who went on to become a leading China scholar and White's longtime friend. In his memoir In Search of History: A Personal Adventure, White describes helping form one of the early Zionist collegiate organizations. He also wrote for The Harvard Crimson.

== China ==
Awarded a Harvard traveling fellowship for a round-the-world journey, White ended up in Chungking (Chongqing), China's wartime capital. The only job he could find was with China's Ministry of Information. When Henry R. Luce, the China-born founder and publisher of Time magazine, came to China, he learned of White's expertise, the two bonded, and White became the China correspondent for Time during the war. He was the first foreign journalist to report the widespread Henan Famine and he filed stories on the strength of the Chinese Communists.

White chafed at the restrictions put on his reporting by the Chinese government censorship, but he also chafed at the spiking or rewriting of his stories by the editors at Time, one of whom was Whittaker Chambers. Although he maintained respect for Luce, White resigned and returned home to write freely, along with Annalee Jacoby, widow of fellow China reporter, Mel Jacoby. Their book about China at war and in crisis was the best-selling Thunder Out of China. The book described the incompetence and corruption of the Nationalist government and sketched the power of the rising Chinese Communist Party. The introduction warned, "In Asia there are a billion people who are tired of the world as it is; they live such terrible bondage that they have nothing to lose but their chains.... Less than a thousand years ago Europe lived this way; then Europe revolted... The people of Asia are going through the same process."

White also witnessed and reported on the famine that occurred in Henan in 1943. White then served as European correspondent for the Overseas News Agency (1948–50) and for The Reporter (1950–53).

He returned to his wartime experience in the novel The Mountain Road (1958), which dealt with the retreat of a team of American troops in China in the face of a Japanese offensive provoked by bombings by the 14th Air Force. The novel was frank about the Americans' conflicting, sometimes negative attitudes toward their allies. It was made into a 1960 movie.

The McCarthy period made it difficult for any reporter or official who had had any contact with communists, however innocent, to escape suspicion of communist sympathies. White opted to turn from writing about China to take up reporting on the Marshall Plan in Europe and then ultimately to the American presidency.

== Making of the President series ==
With experience in analyzing foreign cultures from his time abroad, White took up the challenge of analyzing American culture with the books The Making of the President 1960 (1961), The Making of the President 1964 (1965), The Making of the President 1968 (1969), and The Making of the President 1972 (1973), all analyzing United States presidential elections. The first of these was both a bestseller and a critical success, winning the 1962 Pulitzer Prize for general nonfiction. It remains the most influential publication about the 1960 presidential election that made John F. Kennedy the President. The later presidential books sold well but failed to have as great an effect, partly because other authors were by then publishing about the same topics, and White's larger-than-life style of storytelling became less fashionable during the 1960s and '70s.

A week after the death of JFK, Jacqueline Kennedy summoned White to the Kennedy Compound in Hyannis Port, Massachusetts, to rescue her husband's legacy. She proposed that White prepare an article for Life magazine drawing a parallel between her husband and his administration to King Arthur and the mythical Camelot. At the time, a play of that name was being performed on Broadway and Jackie focused on the ending lyrics of an Alan Jay Lerner song, "Don't let it be forgot, that once there was a spot, for one brief shining moment that was known as Camelot." White, who had known the Kennedy family from his time as a classmate of the late President's brother, Joseph P. Kennedy Jr., was happy to oblige. He heeded some of Jackie's suggestions while writing a 1,000-word essay that he dictated later that evening to his editors at Life. When they complained that the Camelot theme was overdone, Jackie objected to changes. By this telling, Kennedy's time in office was transformed into a modern-day Camelot that represented, "a magic moment in American history, when gallant men danced with beautiful women, when great deeds were done, when artists, writers, and poets met at the White House, and the barbarians beyond the walls held back." White later described his comparison of JFK to Camelot as the result of kindness to a distraught widow of a just-assassinated leader, and wrote that his essay was a "misreading of history. The magic Camelot of John F. Kennedy never existed."

White also interviewed Kennedy's rival Richard Nixon, analyzing his victories in the 1968 and 1972 presidential elections. White interpreted Nixon's victories as a popular rejection of the U.S. welfare state created by the New Deal and the Great Society. He predicted that Nixon would emerge alongside Franklin D. Roosevelt as one of the greatest U.S. Presidents of the 20th century. After Watergate and the fall of Nixon, White broke his quadrennial pattern with Breach of Faith: The Fall of Richard Nixon (1975), a dispassionate account of the scandal and its players. There was no 1976 volume from White; the closest analogue was Marathon by Jules Witcover. After a volume of memoirs, published in 1978, he returned to presidential coverage with the 1980 campaign, and America in Search of Itself: The Making of the President 1956–80 (1982), draws together original reporting and new social analysis of the previous quarter-century, focusing primarily but not exclusively on the Reagan-Carter contest.

TIME partnered with White to publish the 400-page The Making of the President 1984, which was to be a collaborative effort amongst multiple writers. White was expected to write the opening and closing chapters, and the chapter covering the 1984 Democratic National Convention. The remaining chapters were to be written by other Time magazine writers, principally Hays Gorey, Time's Washington correspondent. However, prior to the election, the partnership dissolved, as White was unhappy with the quality of work he was seeing from the Time reporters. This final entry in the series was shortened and titled "The Shaping of the Presidency, 1984", a lengthy post-election analysis piece in Time, in its special Ronald Reagan issue of November 19, 1984.

== Personal life and death ==
White's marriage to Nancy Bean ended in divorce. They had a daughter and a son, Heyden White Rostow and David Fairbank White. His second marriage was to Beatrice Kevitt Hofstadter, the widow of historian Richard Hofstadter.

On May 15, 1986, nine days after his 71st birthday, White suffered a sudden stroke and died in New York City. He was survived by his children and his wife.

== Assessments ==
Both W. A. Swanberg in Luce and His Empire and David Halberstam in The Powers That Be discuss how White's China reporting for Time was extensively rewritten, frequently by Whittaker Chambers, to conform to publisher Henry Luce's admiration for Chiang Kai-shek. Chambers himself explained:

The fight in Foreign News was not a fight for control of a seven-page section of a newsmagazine. It was a struggle to decide whether a million Americans more or less were going to be given the facts about Soviet aggression, or whether those facts were going to be suppressed, distorted, sugared or perverted into the exact opposite of their true meaning. In retrospect, it can be seen that this critical struggle was, on a small scale, an opening round of the Hiss Case.

Conservative author William F. Buckley Jr. wrote an obituary of White in the National Review, saying that "conjoined with his fine mind, his artist's talent, his prodigious curiosity, there was a transcendent wholesomeness, a genuine affection for the best in humankind." He praised White, saying he "revolutionized the art of political reporting." Buckley added that White made one grave strategic mistake during his journalistic lifetime: "Like so many disgusted with Chiang Kai-shek, he imputed to the opposition to Chiang thaumaturgical social and political powers. He overrated the revolutionists' ideals, and underrated their capacity for totalitarian sadism."

In her book, Theodore H. White and Journalism as Illusion, Joyce Hoffman contends that White's "personal ideology undermined professional objectivity" (according to the review of her work in Library Journal). She states "conscious mythmaking" on behalf of his subjects, including Chiang Kai-shek, John F. Kennedy, and David Bruce. Hoffman concludes that White self-censored information embarrassing to his subjects to portray them as heroes.

Others note that White and Jacoby reported on but did not endorse Chinese Communist strength, and cite such passages as:

Will the Communists, if they govern large and complex industrial cities, permit an opposition press and opposition party to challenge them by a combination of patronage and ideology? .... But if the Communists are wrong in their calculations and are outvoted, will they yield to a peaceful vote? Will they champion civil liberties as ardently as they do now? This is a question that cannot be answered until we have had the opportunity of seeing how a transitional coalition regime works in peace time practice.

They also note that the book's influence was ephemeral. Henry Luce, however, refused to even tip his hat to White when they passed on the street, and bitterly criticized "that book by that ugly little Jewish son of a bitch."

Contemporary critics on the left have strongly criticized a 1967 made-for-TV documentary that White wrote called China: The Roots of Madness as a "callous and condescending" portrayal of Chinese. White's reporting was described as "self-important, sanctimonious and he gave voice to no more than an American viewpoint", wherein he portrayed the Chinese as merely pawns in the Cold War, blinkered by their Communist ideology. Film Threat remarked that White never attempted to take on board the Chinese viewpoint, and points out there were unconfirmed rumors that the Central Intelligence Agency was involved in the film's making.

== Portrayal ==
His reporting role in Henan is portrayed by actor Adrien Brody in the 2012 film Back to 1942. Billy Crudup portrayed "the Journalist", an unnamed representation of White, in Pablo Larraín's Jacqueline Kennedy Onassis biopic Jackie.

== Selected publications ==
- White, Theodore H.; Jacoby, Annalee (1946). Thunder Out of China. New York: Sloane. Reprinted: Da Capo, 1980, ISBN 0306801280.
- The Stilwell Papers (1948) by Joseph W. Stilwell, Theodore H. White (ed.)
- Fire in the Ashes: Europe in Mid Century (1953)
- The Mountain Road (1958), novel, reprinted with an introduction by Parks Coble, Eastbridge, 2006, ISBN 978-1-59988-000-6, which was made into a movie starring James Stewart.
- The View from the Fortieth Floor (1960). Novel, depicted his experience at Colliers.
- The Making of the President 1960 (1961)
- The Making of the President 1964 (1965)
- The Making of the President 1968 (1969)
- Caesar at the Rubicon: A Play About Politics (1968)
- The Making of the President 1972 (1973)
- Breach of Faith: The Fall of Richard Nixon. Atheneum Publishers, 1975; Dell, 1986, ISBN 978-0-440-30780-8. OCLC 1370091. A history of the Watergate Scandal, Richard Nixon, and key players of the events.
- ——— (1978). In Search of History: A Personal Adventure. New York: Harper & Row. ISBN 0060145994.. Memoir of White's early years, training at Harvard under John K. Fairbank, experiences in wartime China, relations with Time publisher Henry Luce, and later tribulations and success as originator of the Making of the President series.
- America in Search of Itself: The Making of the President 1956–1980 (Harper & Row, 1982) ISBN 978-0-06-039007-5
- Theodore H. White at Large: The Best of His Magazine Writing, 1939–1986, Theodore Harold White, ed. Edward T. Thompson, Pantheon Books, 1992, ISBN 978-0-679-41635-7

== References and further reading ==
- Brands, Hal (2010), "(Review Article) Burying Theodore White: Recent Accounts of the 1960 Presidential Election", Presidential Studies Quarterly, 40 (2): 364–367, doi:10.1111/j.1741-5705.2010.03761.x, JSTOR 23044826
- Ferling, John E. (1977). "History as Journalism: An Assessment of Theodore White". Journalism Quarterly. 54 (2): 320–326. doi:10.1177/107769907705400213.
- French, Paul. Through the Looking Glass: Foreign Journalists in China, from the Opium Wars to Mao. Hong Kong University Press, 2009.
- Griffith, Thomas (1995). Harry and Teddy: The Turbulent Friendship of Press Lord Henry R. Luce and His Favorite Reporter, Theodore H. White. New York: Random House.
- Hayford, Charles W. (2009). "China by the Book: China Hands and China Stories, 1848-1948". Journal of American-East Asian Relations. 16 (4): 285–311. doi:10.1163/187656109792655508.
- Hoffmann, Joyce (1995). Theodore H. White and journalism as illusion. U of Missouri Press.
- Rand, Peter. China Hands. New York: Simon & Schuster, 1995.
- Sullivan, Walter. ". . . The Crucial 1940s Nieman Reports." The Nieman Foundation for Journalism at Harvard University (Spring 1983)
