= Mao: A Reinterpretation =

Book by Lee Feigon

- First edition cover
- Author: Lee Feigon
- Language: English
- Subject: Mao Zedong
- Publisher: Ivan R. Dee
- Publication date: 2002
- Publication place: United Kingdom
- Media type: Print (Hardcover)
- Pages: 240
- ISBN: 978-1566635226

Mao: A Reinterpretation is a biography of the Chinese communist revolutionary and politician Mao Zedong written by Lee Feigon, an American historian of China then working at Colby College. It was first published by Ivan R. Dee in 2002, and would form the basis of Feigon's 2006 documentary Passion of the Mao. Feigon's book aimed to highlight the achievements of Mao's government. He argues that Mao was influenced by Joseph Stalin to a far greater extent during the Chinese Civil War than has previously been believed.

Mao: A Reinterpretation was reviewed by academic Sinologists such as Ross Terrill, Arthur Waldron, and Gregor Benton. The reception was mixed, with some reviewers arguing that Feigon neglected Mao's autocratic tendencies, while others praised Feigon for his argument that the early Mao was heavily influenced by Stalin.

== Background ==
At the time of publication, Feigon had established himself as a "respected China specialist", who is known for "plain speaking" and his "readiness to stick his neck out".

== Reception ==
=== Academic reviews ===
"In this interpretative study of the life of Mao Zedong, [Feigon] sets out to clear away two supposed myths: that Mao was an innovative and independent thinker up to 1949, and that he became a Stalinist tyrant thereafter. Instead, he argues the reverse: Mao followed and relied on Joseph Stalin in the early period but became increasingly original and creative in the late 1950s and the 1960s, when he set China on the road to fundamental change."

— Gregor Benton, 2003.

The Australian Sinologist Ross Terrill of Harvard University reviewed Mao: A Reinterpretation for the Journal of Cold War Studies. Noting that it was clearly not a biography but rather a "smoothly presented plea against the currently prevailing view" of Mao, he refused to fault Feigon on his "unfashionable" views. He nevertheless identified two areas where he disagreed with Feigon's revisionism; first, he noted that Feigon had never dealt with the issue of Mao's "Führerism" and autocratic influence, while secondly, he noted that Feigon made no use of new data, instead merely offering a "Trotskyite opinion" on the available information. Highlighting a number of factual errors and an unexplained use of both forms of transliteration, he nevertheless believed that Feigon did present some "valid points", such as that Mao was far more influenced by Stalin in the 1920s and 1930s than has been widely recognized. Concluding his review, Terrill admitted to being perplexed as to why Feigon had written the book, offering neither "a powerful defense" of the Great Leap Forward and Cultural Revolution or a case for "anarchism or Chinese Trotskyism".

Barrett L. McCormick of Marquette University reviewed the work for the Pacific Affairs journal. Believing it less of a "reinterpretation" than a revival of an interpretation common during the 1970s, he remarked that Feigon does what he can to shift the blame from Mao for human rights abuses wherever possible. Stating that he did not "systematically discuss environmental damage, famine in Tibet, [or] the fate of intellectuals", he summed up his review by commenting that contrary to Feigon's opinions, he found Mao no more attractive than Stalin. The American Historical Review published a review authored by Gregor Benton of the University of Wales. He argued that Feigon's presentation of Mao and Stalin's relationship was "true in broad design" but failed to take into account those examples where Mao ignored Moscow's commands. Critical that Feigon did not specify how he was defining "Stalinism", Benton commented that Mao's regime could be seen as Stalinist in most definitions of the term. Opining that the book was bound to court controversy, he thought that had set an "agenda for debate" and would appear on student reading list in future years.

=== Conservative press reviews ===
American historian Arthur Waldron, the Lauder Professor of International Relations in the History Department at the University of Pennsylvania, published a review of Feigon's book on the website of U.S. conservative think-tank, the Claremont Institute. Waldron noted that Feigon's book represented the first "serious attempt to depict [Mao] as something other than the monster he undoubtedly was", and that it came from an author who had clearly had sympathies for Mao during the 1960s. Believing that the text was "at best quixotic" for attempting to portray Mao as "a highly positive historical figure", he denigrated it as being "wildly wrong". Nevertheless, he noted that Feigon was right in emphasising the influence of Stalin and the Soviet Union over Mao's early political thought. In his review of Jung Chang and Jon Halliday's Mao: The Unknown Story (2005), Jude Blanchette of the Foundation for Economic Education (an American free market think tank) compared it favourably to Feigon's work. He criticized Dow Jones' review in the Far Eastern Economic Review, believing it too positive and remarking, "Can one imagine a respected scholar publishing and receiving praise for a book entitled Hitler: A Reinterpretation?"
