= Annalee Whitmore Fadiman =

Author, correspondent and scriptwriter

- Born: Analee Whitmore; May 26, 1916; Price, Utah
- Died: February 5, 2002 (aged 85); Captiva, Florida
- Occupations: Writer and correspondent
- Spouse: Melville Jacoby (m. 1941; died 1942) Clifton Fadiman (m. 1950; died 1999)
- Children: 2, including Anne Fadiman

Annalee Whitmore Fadiman (May 27, 1916 – February 5, 2002) was a scriptwriter for MGM, and World War II foreign correspondent for Life and Time magazines. Under the name Annalee Jacoby she was the co-author with Theodore H. White of Thunder Out of China, a book of reportage on World War Two in China.

== Early life ==
Fadiman was born in Price, Utah, the daughter of bank president Leland Whitmore and Anne Sharp Whitmore, who later became a librarian at New York Public Library. Fadiman graduated from Stanford University in 1937. She was the first woman to be managing editor of the Stanford Daily student newspaper. She moved from San Francisco, where she briefly worked at the Agricultural Adjustment Administration, then to Los Angeles taking a secretarial pool job at MGM. She wrote several screen treatments including Andy Hardy Meets Debutante (1940) and a screen adaptation for Tish.

== Career ==
MGM offered her a contract but once the war began, Fadiman found "the prospect of seven years of Hollywood fluff when the real world was falling apart unendurable," and she applied to become a war correspondent but the War Department didn't allow female correspondents. She became a publicity manager for United China Relief, an aid organization, and wrote speeches for Madame Chiang Kai-shek. During her marriage to correspondent Melville Jacoby, Fadiman survived a month-long escape from the Philippines, and did six weeks of reporting from the front lines of Bataan and Corregidor. Their writings were used nearly unedited, by John Hersey, in his best-seller Men on Bataan.

After the death of her husband, she continued to work as a journalist. Theodore H. White persuaded Time Magazine's Henry Luce to petition the War Department for credentials for Fadiman. She became the only female correspondent reporting from Chongqing, China's wartime capital. After the war, she collaborated with White on the best-selling book Thunder Out of China, about China's role in the war which contained portions of their published dispatches from Time.

In the following years, she wrote, lectured, and participated in the radio quiz show Information Please.

== Personal life ==
She married Melville Jacoby on November 24, 1941 in Manila, Philippines. He was killed in an airfield accident in Darwin in 1942 after the couple had moved to Brisbane.

She married Clifton Fadiman in 1950. The couple had two children, Kim Fadiman and Anne Fadiman. Fadiman lived on Captiva Island, Florida and was a member of the Hemlock Society. She took her own life in 2002 after living with breast cancer and Parkinson's disease.
