= Thunder Out of China =

1946 book by Theodore White and Annalee Jacoby

- Title page for Thunder Out of China (1946)
- Author: Theodore White; Annalee Jacoby
- Language: English
- Subject: Second Sino-Japanese War
- Set in: China
- Publisher: Sloane
- Publication date: 1946
- Publication place: United States
- Pages: 331
- Awards: Book of the Month Club

Thunder Out of China is a 1946 best-selling book by American journalists Theodore White and Annalee Jacoby. The authors were wartime correspondents for Time magazine during the Second Sino-Japanese War (1937–1945). It was a Book of the Month Club selection in 1946.

Orville Schell called the book's story a "great epic of misunderstanding" and recommended it as one of the five best books on China and the West, one that described Chiang Kai-shek, "the failure of his experiment, and the corruption and complete unravelling of China under the pressures of Japanese occupation and war." Other critics and historians say that White and Jacoby were biased by American General Joseph Stilwell and that the popularity of the book damaged Chiang's post-war reputation.

== Background ==
White was a 1938 graduate of Harvard College, where he majored in History, learned to ride a horse in R.O.T.C., and studied Classical Chinese. He was the first honors student of John King Fairbank, but decided against pursuing an academic career, however, fearing the antisemitism in the profession. Instead, he went to China, taking a job with the Nationalist government in Chongqing, the nation's wartime capital. In 1941, Henry Luce, publisher of Time Magazine, who had been born in China as the son of a missionary and maintained a strong interest in the country, came to Chongqing to view China's resistance. White made such an impression that Luce made him Time's China correspondent.

Annalee Jacoby was one of the few women covering the war. She was denied press credentials by the American Department of War until Luce used his influence; she was the first woman war correspondent in the Pacific war. Her husband Melville Jacoby was killed in an airfield accident in the Philippines in 1942.

White wrote in his memoirs that on his return to the United States in 1946 the "immediate task was clear: to write a book that explained what was happening in China. The book must say it not only first and best, but quickly. My information was important. It was news, not history. Over the years, I was to learn how much more dangerous news is than history. All of us in those days entertained the illusion that we could make events march in the direction we pointed, if we pointed clearly enough."

The original title was to be "A Point in Time," but a friend in the Book of the Month Club suggested "Thunder Out of China." Book of the Month Club adoption meant $80,000 for the two authors. The 1946 edition sold 450,000 copies, more than any other book on China except The Good Earth (1931) or Alice Tisdale Hobart's Oil for the Lamps of China (1933).

== Contents and argument ==
The book presents background chapters on the history of modern China, then moves on to events of the war. Central chapters cover the bombings of Chongqing, the relocations, the political conflicts in the government, activities of the Americans and British. The Henan famine of 1942 receives chapter length coverage. White reported in detail, but the central government denied knowledge and did not respond to this provincial catastrophe. The authors also analyze how the war ended, and the Chinese civil war began. There is detailed reporting on the wartime Kuomintang, the Chinese Communist Party, the role of Patrick J. Hurley, and the Marshall Mission of 1946.

The rivalry between the Communists and the Nationalists is a central theme. White was impressed with the Communist treatment of the peasant on his visit to the Communist base in Yan'an. Their leaders "flatly deny the assumption of many American friends that they are merely agrarian reformers, not Communists at all." He wrote that the "entire Communist political thesis could be reduced to a single paragraph":

if you take such a peasant, treat him like a man, ask his opinion, let him vote for a local government, let him organize his own police and gendarmes, decide on his own taxes, and vote himself a reduction in rent and interest – if you do all that, the peasant becomes a man who has something to fight for, and he will fight to preserve it against any enemy, Japanese or Chinese."

White and Jacoby call the Communists "masters of brutality" and says peasants are "putty in the hands of their Communist mentors." They say that Chinese Communist leaders "prided themselves on their democracy," but when you listened to their conversation you found a "stubborn, irreducible realism." White and Jacoby looked to "men of the middle group" for hope but found they were not well organized, had no army or political machine, or roots in any social class. "Only the spread of education and industry can create enough men of the modern world to give them a broad social base." The Nationalist government was dependent on United States support: "If U.S. withdraws, within 10 years China will come under the control of the Communists, and then all of Asia."

The historian Charles Hayford writes that Thunder Out of China presents revolution as "fearful, likely, and natural." Hayford says that the book was one of the first in English to use a scheme of history and progress that saw China in the historical stage of feudalism. Since feudalism in Europe was ended by the French Revolution, feudalism in China should also lead to revolution. White and Jacoby write that the Nationalist government was dominated by "feudal minded men" who ran it in the interests of "feudal landlords." and that the Communists represented a new French Revolution: "We revere the memory of that Revolution, but we regard such uprisings in our own time with horror and loathing."

== Reception and influence ==
Paul French writing in 2023 called it "one of the most popular WWII books of all time," one that has "largely withstood the test of time." Owen Lattimore, reviewing in the Atlantic Magazine, wrote that the book revealed the incompetence and the corruption that weakened the Kuomintang's ability to rule or eliminate its own undesirable party bosses, adding that the Nationalist government had a hard time recruiting, younger, more honest, or more competent men. Donald G. Tewksbury, the son of China missionaries, writing in Far Eastern Survey, called the book "prescient" but objected to its unbalanced treatment of Chiang Kai-shek and unrealistic expectation that the United States could lead an Asian revolution.

Critics saw the book in a different light. Some of Chiang's biographers blamed White and Jacoby for popularizing Joseph Stilwell's low estimation of Chiang and not realizing that Stilwell's American belief in offensive warfare led him to falsely assume that Chiang was reluctant to fight the Japanese.. And another study charged that White "knowingly misrepresented the political situation in China because he believed the survival of China and the defeat of fascism depended on it." Geraldine Fitch, a long-time Shanghai resident and friend of the Chiangs, for instance, replied in a detailed pamphlet, "Blunder Out of China," published by the American China Policy Association. She did not assume that White and Jacoby were communists, but said a "red streak of bias" runs through the book and that "an easy fluency hides an appalling ignorance of China." Since the authors did not go to China until after the war had started they "lack the perspective to compare New China... with Old China." The farmer of China, she continues, has not been "beaten, swindled. and kicked about," as the communists claim, but is an "independent, industrious. cheerful individual," a higher percentage of whom own their own land than do American farmers." She says White does not see that China "is in the vanguard against the aggression of Communism."

Henry Luce turned against White, his one-time protegee. When they passed on the street, he refused to tip his hat and denounced "that book by that ugly little Jewish son of a bitch." But Christopher Jespersen concludes that the American public soon lost interest in China and the impact of the book was "ephemeral at best".

== See also ==
- Red Star Over China
- China Hands
