= South–South cooperation =

Geopolitical concept

South–South cooperation (SSC) is a term historically used by policymakers and academics to describe the exchange of resources, technology, and knowledge between developing countries.

== Definition ==
The term South or Global South is defined as regions in the world that have similar political, social and economic histories that are rooted in disparities that occurred during the colonial or imperialist era. The South is understood as an ideological expression of the concerns facing developing regions, which are increasingly diverse in economic and political experience.

The Global South is making increasingly significant contributions to global development. The economic and geopolitical relevance of many countries has grown. In the past, South–South cooperation focused on sharing knowledge and building capacities, but the countries of the Global South and new financial institutions have recently also become increasingly active in development finance. This collaboration refers to the long-term historical project of liberating communities and nations from the remnants of colonialism, poverty, oppression and backwardness.

This cooperation becomes the main organizing concept and set of practices in achieving historical change through a vision of mutual benefit and solidarity among groups that can be said to be disadvantaged in the world system. This conveys the hope that cooperation through the development sector can be achieved by these disadvantaged communities through their mutual assistance to each other, and the entire world order is transformed to reflect their shared interests from the domination of the Northern countries.

== History ==
The formation of SSC can be traced to the Asian–African Conference that took place in Bandung, Indonesia, in 1955. The conference has been largely regarded as a milestone for SSC. Indonesia's president at that time, Sukarno, referred to it as "the first intercontinental conference of coloured peoples in the history of mankind." Despite Sukarno's opening address about the conference, there had been gatherings similar to the Bandung Conference in the past. Nevertheless the Bandung Conference was distinctive and facilitated the formation of SSC because it was the first time that the countries in attendance were no longer colonies of distant European powers. President Sukarno also famously remarked at the conference that "Now we are free, sovereign, and independent. We are again masters in our own house. We do not need to go to other continents to confer."

The conference was sponsored by Burma, Ceylon, India, Indonesia, and Pakistan, and was attended by these 29 independent countries: Afghanistan, Burma, Cambodia, Ceylon, China, Egypt, Ethiopia, Gold Coast, India, Indonesia, Iran, Iraq, Japan, Jordan, Laos, Lebanon, Liberia, Libya, Nepal, Pakistan, the Philippines, Saudi Arabia, the Sudan, Syria, Thailand, Turkey, the Democratic Republic of Vietnam, the State of Vietnam, and the Kingdom of Yemen. Each country supported the continuation of decolonization efforts happening in both Africa and Asia at the time. Although many countries disagreed on some issues, the Bandung Conference "provided the first major instance of the post-colonial countries' collective resistance to Western dominance in international relations."

In 1978, the United Nations established the Unit for South–South Cooperation to promote South–South trade and collaboration within its agencies.

However, the impact of South–South cooperation on development began to be felt only in the late 1990s. Due to the geographical spectrum, activities are known as Africa–South America (ASA) cooperation as well as, in the Asia-Pacific region, South–South cooperation.

As of 2026, three ASA summits have been held. The first summit was held in Abuja, Nigeria, in 2006 where 53 delegates from Africa and 12 from South America attended. The second was held on the Margarita Island in Venezuela in September 2009 where 49 heads of states from Africa and 12 heads of states from South America attended. The third was originally scheduled to be held in Libya in September 2011, but was postponed due to the outbreak of the Libyan Civil War; It was ultimately held in Malabo, Equatorial Guinea, in February 2013. The fourth was scheduled to be held in Quito, Ecuador, in mid-2016, but was postponed to 2017 and then postponed indefinitely.

South–South cooperation has helped to decrease dependence on the aid programs of developed countries and shift the international balance of power.

== Normative principles ==
- Mutual respect regarding state sovereignty
- Partnership between equal countries
- Obtain benefits related to cooperation evenly
- Does not depend on conditions
- There is no intervention between countries that cooperate with each other (non-interference)

== Direction ==
The leaders of South American and African countries hope that this cooperation will bring a new world order and counter the existing Western dominance socially, economically and politically. President Hugo Chávez of Venezuela saw the formation of this cooperation as the "beginning of the salvation of [the] people."

== Economic cooperation ==
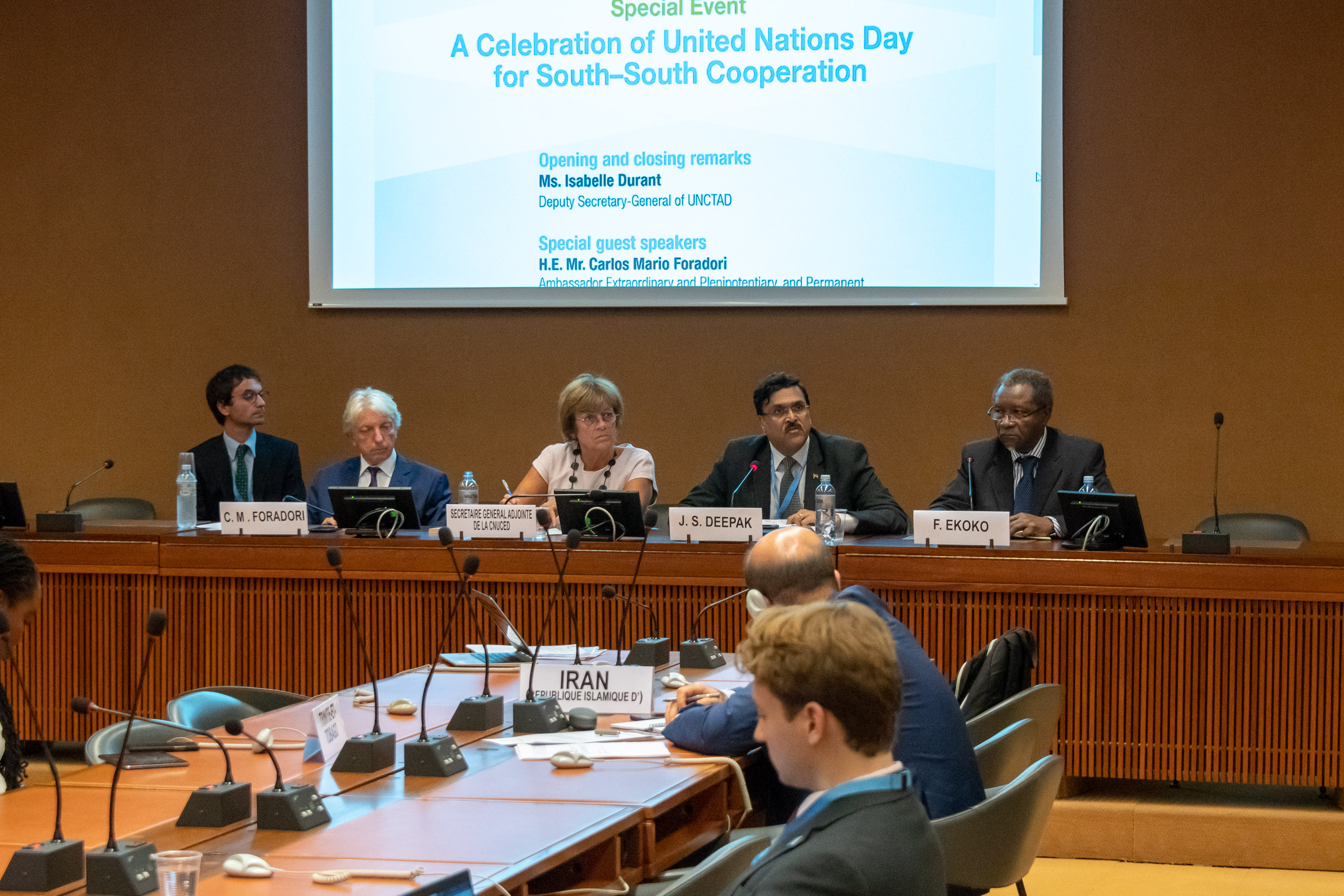
Special Event on UN Day for South-South Cooperation

One of the key goals of the cooperation is to strengthen and improve economic ties. Some of the areas which these "Southern" nations look forward to improving further include joint investment in energy and oil, and a common bank. Among other regional trade agreements which were reached during the 2009 summit was Venezuela signing an oil agreement with South Africa and a memorandum of understanding with Sierra Leone to form a joint mining company. Meanwhile, Brazil has developed an increasingly successful model of overseas aid provision of over US$1 billion annually (ahead of many traditional donors), which focuses on technical expertise and knowledge transfer. Most Brazilian aid is allocated to Africa, specifically to Portuguese-speaking African countries, and Latin America. Brazil's form of South–South development aid has been called a "global model in waiting".

The two continents have over one quarter of the world's energy resources. This includes the oil and natural gas reserves in Bolivia, Brazil, Ecuador, Venezuela, Algeria, Angola, Chad, Equatorial Guinea, Gabon, Libya and Nigeria.

=== Banks to finance infrastructure projects ===
One challenge for South–South cooperation has been the lack of sufficient capital to start a South–South bank as an alternative to the International Monetary Fund (IMF) and the World Bank. This has changed with the launch of two new "South–South banks".

At the sixth summit of the BRICS countries (Brazil, Russia, India, China and South Africa), in July 2014, the five partners approved the establishment of the New Development Bank (or BRICS Development Bank), with a primary focus on lending for infrastructure projects. It is based in Shanghai. A Contingency Reserve Agreement (CRA) has been concluded in parallel to provide the BRICS countries with alternatives to the World Bank and IMF in times of economic hardship, protect their national economies and strengthen their global position. The Russian Federation is contributing US$18 billion to the CRA, which will be credited by the five partners with a total of over US$100 billion. The CRA is now operational. In 2015 and 2016, work was underway to develop financing mechanisms for innovative projects with the new bank's resources.

The second new bank is the Asian Infrastructure Investment Bank. It has also been set up to finance infrastructure projects. Spearheaded by China, the bank is based in Beijing. By 2016, more than 50 countries had expressed interest in joining, including a number of developed countries, such as France, Germany, the Republic of Korea and the United Kingdom.

=== Asia–Pacific Free Trade Area ===
China is spearheading the creation of an Asia–Pacific Free Trade Area, which, according to China's vision, would override existing bilateral and multilateral free trade agreements in the region. The Asia-Pacific Economic Cooperation summit in November 2014 endorsed the Beijing Roadmap for completing a feasibility study by late 2016.

=== Special economic zones ===
China's overseas special economic zones (SEZs) are another example of South–South cooperation. From 1990 to 2018, Chinese enterprises established eleven SEZs in Sub-Saharan Africa and the Middle East including two in Nigeria and one each in Algeria, Djibouti, Egypt, Kenya, Mauritania, Mauritius, Oman and Zambia. Generally, the Chinese government takes a hands-off approach, leaving it to Chinese enterprises to work to establish such zones (although it does provide support in the form of grants, loans and subsidies, including support via the China Africa Development Fund). The Forum on China-Africa Cooperation promotes these SEZs heavily. As Professor Dawn C. Murphy summarizes, these zones "aim to transfer China's development successes to other countries, increase business opportunities for China manufacturing companies, avoid trade barriers by setting up zones in countries with preferential trade access to important markets, and create a positive business environment for Chinese small and medium-sized enterprises investing in these regions."

=== Role of regional economic communities ===
Countries of the South are developing cooperation through regional economic communities. For example, the Russian Federation is developing co-operation with Asian partners within the Shanghai Cooperation Organisation and the Eurasian Economic Union. The latter was launched on 1 January 2015 with Belarus and Kazakhstan and has since been extended to Armenia and Kyrgyzstan. The Eurasian Economic Union replaces the Eurasian Economic Community.

Other South–South cooperation organizations include the China Arab States Cooperation Forum and the Forum on China-Africa Cooperation (the latter has a significant political collaboration component, in addition to economic cooperation).

=== South–South cooperation in agriculture ===
In light of its ideological commitment to South–South cooperation (and motivated by a pragmatic desire to increase food security), China has established a series of Agricultural Technology Demonstration Centers in Africa. These are a highly visible component of agricultural cooperation between China and African countries. The function of these centers is to transmit agricultural expertise and technology from China to developing countries in Africa while also creating market opportunities for Chinese companies in the agricultural sector.

China first announced its Agricultural Technology Demonstrations Centers at the 2006 meeting of the Forum on China-Africa Cooperation. It launched 19 of these centers between 2006 and 2018, all in Sub-Saharan Africa. As of 2023, Agricultural Technology Demonstration Centers exist in 24 African countries.

== South–South cooperation in science ==
=== Bilateral collaboration ===
Countries are also co-operating in science, technology and innovation on a bilateral basis to develop infrastructure and diversify the economy. There is "dynamic bilateral collaboration" between China and the Russian Federation, for instance. This cooperation stems from the Treaty of Good Neighbourliness and Friendly Co-operation signed by the two countries in 2001, which has given rise to regular four-year plans for its implementation. Dozens of joint large-scale projects are being carried out. They concern the construction of the first super-high-voltage electricity transmission line in China; the development of an experimental fast-neutron reactor; geological prospecting in the Russian Federation and China; and joint research in optics, metallurgy, hydraulics, aerodynamics and solid fuel cells. Other priority areas for co-operation include industrial and medical lasers, computer technology, energy, the environment, chemistry, geochemistry, catalytic processes and new materials.

=== Role of regional centres ===
Increasingly, countries of the South are fostering cooperation in science and technology through regional or international centres. Regional and international centres have been set up under the auspices of United Nations agencies. One example is the International Science, Technology and Innovation Centre for South–South Cooperation (ISTIC) in Malaysia. It was established in 2008 under the auspices of UNESCO. In 2014, the Caribbean network of scientists, Cariscience, ran a training workshop in Tobago on Technopreneurship for the Caribbean, in partnership with ISTIC. Another example is a centre which uses Synchrotron-light for Experimental Science and Applications in the Middle East (SESAME).

=== Space technology ===
China and Brazil have successfully cooperated in the field of space. Among the most successful space cooperation projects were the development and launch of Earth observation satellites. As of 2023, the two countries have jointly developed six China-Brazil Earth Resource Satellites. These projects have helped both Brazil and China develop their access to satellite imagery and promoted remote sensing research. Brazil and China's cooperation is a unique example of South–South cooperation between two developing countries in the field of space.

=== Climate change ===
China is a clean energy leader and both exports its technology to other developing countries and is a source of bilateral cooperation programs with other countries in the Global South. The "Ten, Hundred, Thousand" program is China's overarching initiative for South–South cooperation in addressing climate change. Announced in 2016, it aims to establish ten low-carbon demonstration zones, 100 climate change mitigation projects, and 1,000 cooperation projects for climate change training. As of 2023, China had signed partnerships with at least 27 other developing countries as part of this initiative. The Seychelles, Sri Lanka, and Myanmar have signed memorandums of understanding to develop low carbon demonstration zones. China has supported numerous climate change training programs as part of the initiative.

Brazil and China have established the China-Brazil Center for Climate Change and Energy Technology Innovation, which is one of the most ambitious South-South bilateral clean energy programs.

== Security cooperation ==
Peace and security responsibilities are also on the top of the agenda for cooperation. During the 2009 Africa-South America Summit, Muammar al-Gaddafi proposed a defence alliance between South America and Africa. He called the alliance "a NATO of the South."

== Cultural cooperation ==
=== Sport ===
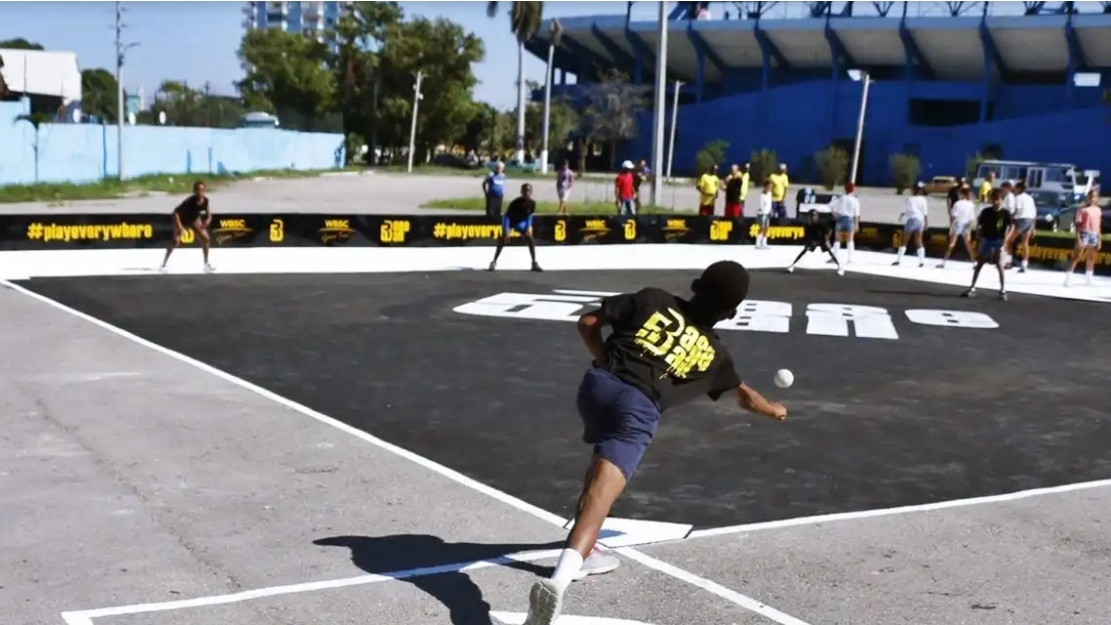
Baseball5, inspired by Latin American street sport and designed to be accessible for developing countries.

Cuba has been noted for interacting with a wide variety of countries through offering sport training programs. There has also been interest in analysing the use of multi-sport events to encourage sports diplomacy.

== South–South migration ==
Migration between Global South countries constitutes at least one-third of all international migration, and generally takes places between neighbouring countries. For example, 98% of immigrants to India recorded their previous place of residence as being from another part of Asia. Recent South–South migration has seen migrants travel longer distances, with the South Asian diaspora in the Middle East constituting the largest such migration corridor.

== See also ==
- Afro-Asia
- BRICS
- Global South Development Magazine
- Developing countries
- Fair trade
- Group of 77
- Least Developed Countries
- Non-Aligned Movement
- North-South divide
- Protocol on Trade Negotiations
- Second Africa-South America Summit
- South Centre (organization)
- UNDP
- UNIDO
- South Project

== External link ==
- Official website
