= 1 New York Street =

High-rise office building in Manchester, England

Coordinates: 53.480281°N 2.239524°W

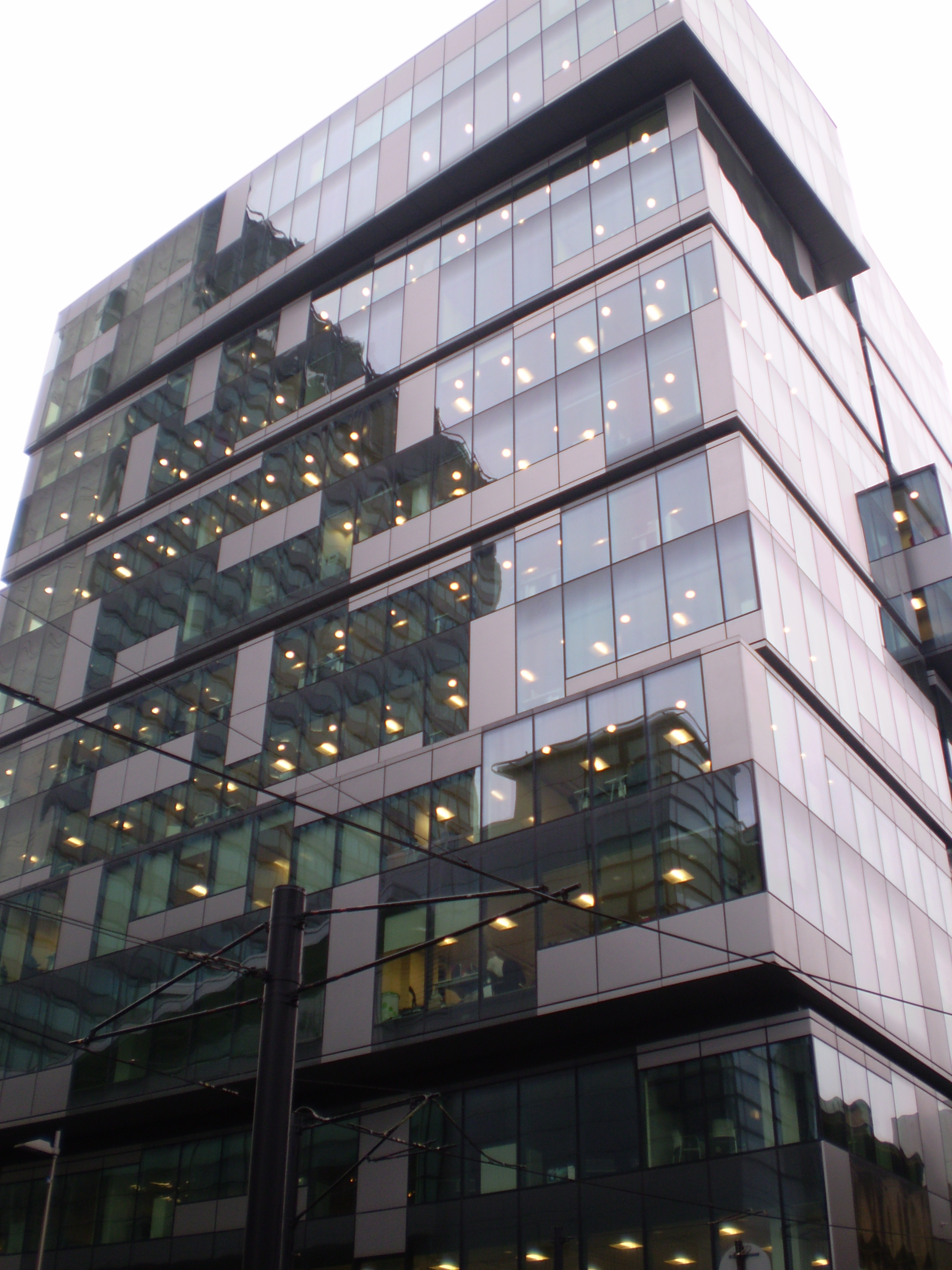
- Interactive map of the 1 New York Street area

General information
- Architectural style: Modernist
- Location: Manchester, United Kingdom
- Construction started: 2007
- Completed: 2009
- Cost: £25 million
- Client: Bruntwood

Height
- Height: 55 m (180 ft)

Technical details
- Floor count: 15
- Floor area: 113,300 sq ft (10,530 m^{2})

Design and construction
- Architect: Denton Corker Marshall
- Main contractor: Sir Robert McAlpine

Website
- onenewyorkstreet.com

1 New York Street is a high-rise office building in Manchester city centre, England. Designed by Denton Corker Marshall, the building is situated on Mosley Street opposite 38 and 42 Mosley Street. The building opened in 2009 with Bank of New York Mellon as its main tenant. It's a prominent address in the city and is known for its central location and accessibility. It's within walking distance of many of Manchester's attractions, restaurants, shops, and public transportation options. The total floor area of the building is 113,300 sq ft, and the building itself is typically used for office space for various businesses and organisations.

== Architecture ==
The design consists of two glass and metal 'boxes' that appear to jut out of the main building, while the building façade consists of glass and aluminium cladding. The city centre location of the 1 New York Street site presented a number of challenges due to adjacent tram lines in the road and tunnels underneath the building. To minimise disturbance to both the tram lines and the surrounding area, the existing basement structure was used in conjunction with new pile foundations. 1 New York Street was the first speculative building in central Manchester to be awarded a BREEAM 'excellent' rating.

== Occupancy ==
As of March 2023, the building is occupied by CNA Hardy, DC Advisory, Johnson Controls, Marks & Clerk and Turley.
