= Second Africa-South America Summit =

The Second Africa-South America Summit took place in September 2009 on Margarita Island, Venezuela. It aimed to develop South-South Cooperation.

The summit discussed a Southern equivalent of NATO.

The First Africa-South America Summit took place in Nigeria in 2006. The third was scheduled for Libya in 2011, but due to the Libyan Civil War which toppled the government, the third summit was postponed until 2013, when it was held in Malabo, Equatorial Guinea.

== See also ==
- Radio of the South
- Bank of the South
- Global System of Trade Preferences among Developing Countries (GSTP)
