= Melbourne Museum =

Museum in Melbourne, Victoria, Australia

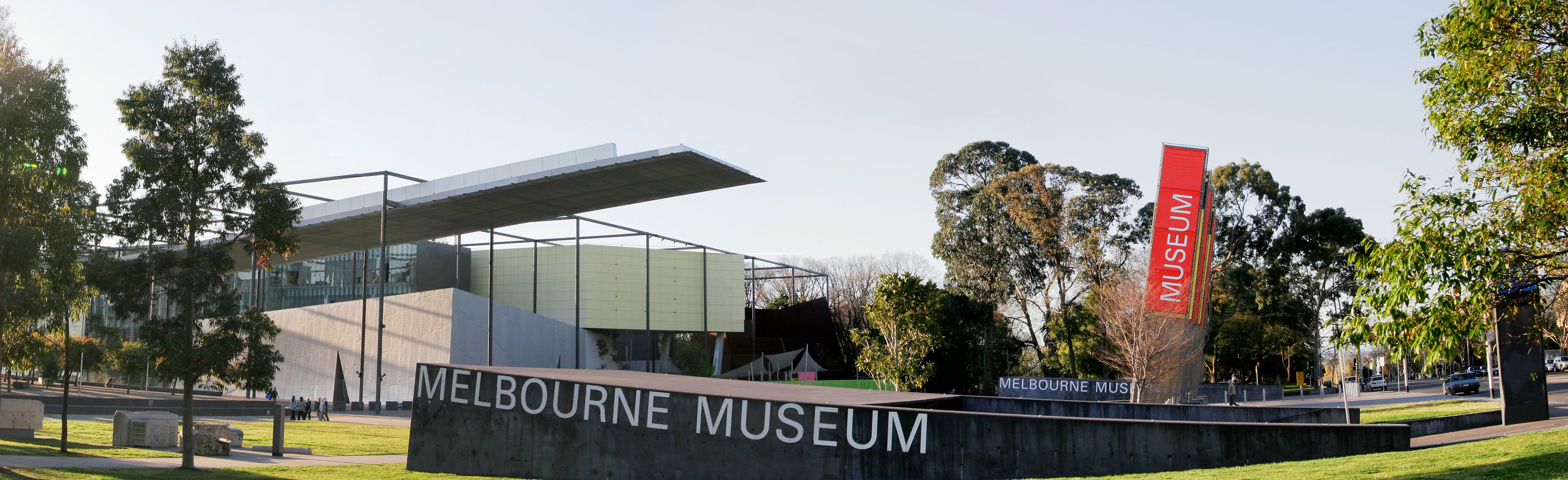
- Melbourne Museum in the Carlton Gardens
- Established: 1854
- Location: Carlton, Victoria, Australia
- Coordinates: 37.803337°S 144.971445°E
- Type: Natural and cultural history museum
- Owner: Museums Victoria
- Public transit access: Melbourne Museum/Nicholson St (#11): 86, 96; Bus routes 250, 251, 402
- Website: museumsvictoria.com.au/melbournemuseum/

The Melbourne Museum is a natural and cultural history museum located in the Carlton Gardens in Melbourne, Australia.

Located adjacent to the Royal Exhibition Building, the museum was opened in 2000 as a project of the Government of Victoria, on behalf of Museums Victoria which administers the venue.

The museum won Best Tourist Attraction at the Australian Tourism Awards in 2011.

In addition to its galleries, the museum features spaces such as a cafe and a gift shop. The back-of-house area houses some of the Victoria's State Collections, which holds over 17 million items, including objects relating to Indigenous Australian and Pacific Islander cultures, geology, historical studies, palaeontology, technology and society, and zoology, as well as a library collection that holds 18th and 19th century scientific monographs and serials. The world's second largest IMAX theatre screen, which is also part of the museum complex, shows movies and documentary films in large-screen 3-D format.

== Architecture ==
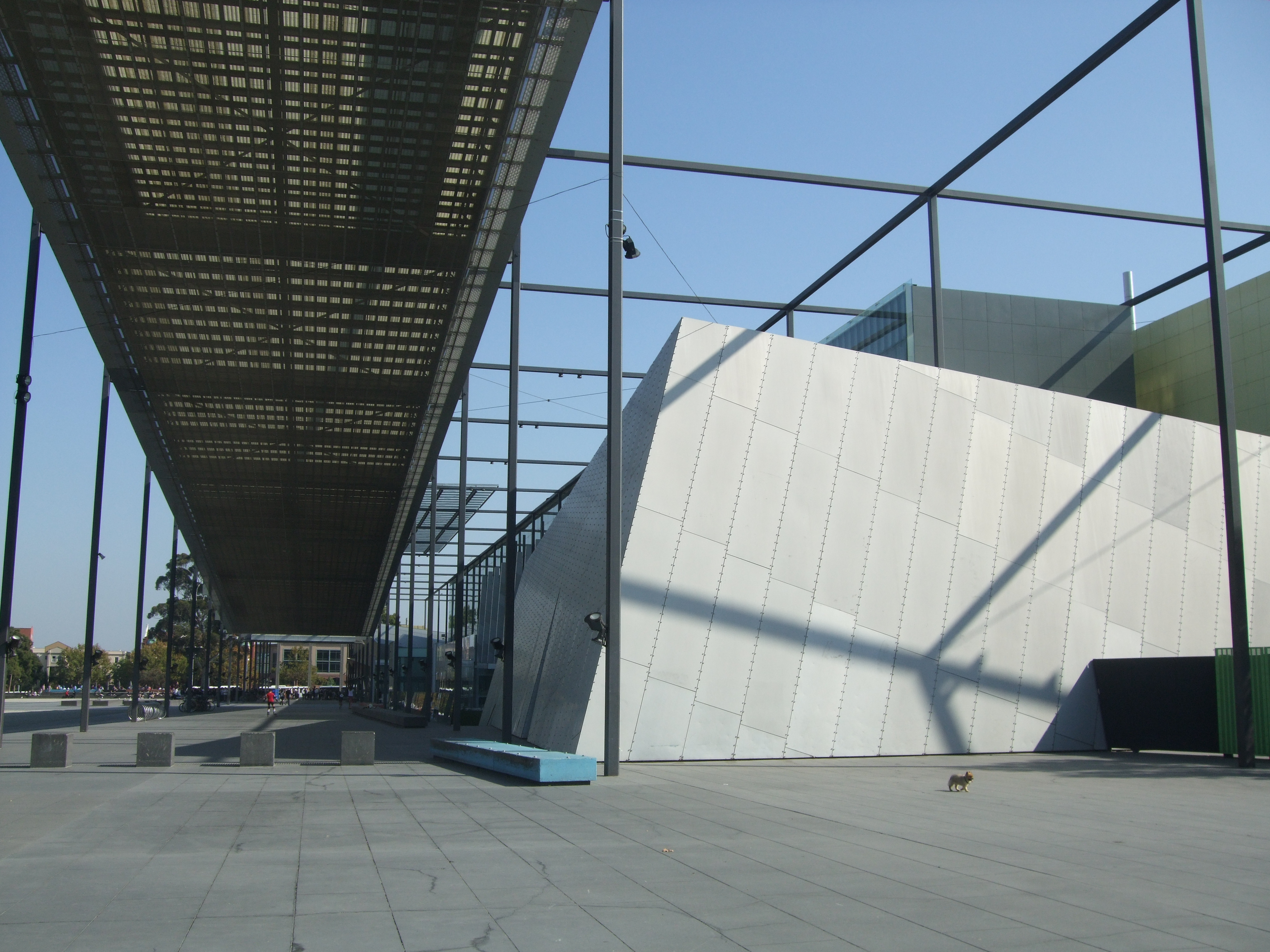
Melbourne Museum from Nicholson Street approach

The Melbourne Museum is a post-modernist building designed by Denton Corker Marshall architects. Construction at the current address was managed by Baulderstone Hornibrook and completed in 2001, with the museum's official opening in 2000.

The building can be dissected into different spaces so an individual can navigate the building in an orthogonal manner. It is designed as both a single building and a network of individual buildings integrated into the landscape of the Carlton Gardens.

The museum is axially aligned with the adjacent Italianate Royal Exhibition Building and references it, along with the skyscrapers of Melbourne's central business district. The sticks and blades that make up the Melbourne Museum are hallmarks of Denton Corker Marshall's architecture.

The most prominent element of the building are the two very long, very high, sloping canopies (or blades) that rise up from the centrally placed entrance opposite the north door of the Royal Exhibition Building; each act to guide visitors from the street into the museum. On the northern side of the building, another larger blade-like roof rises up from the centre to the north, on a similar scale to the central Florentine dome of the Royal Exhibition building.

The Melbourne Museum is situated in a precinct adjacent to a large local landmark within a large public park. Contrasted against the neo-classical Royal Exhibition centre, the museum is separated by an events plaza, yet the two are connected underground with a car park. The museum refers to Melbourne's city grid in its planning, and integrates the landscape of Carlton Gardens, housing a Forest Gallery which is situated within the building, and also providing areas of exterior circulation around the building.

== History ==
=== 1854–2000: La Trobe Street ===
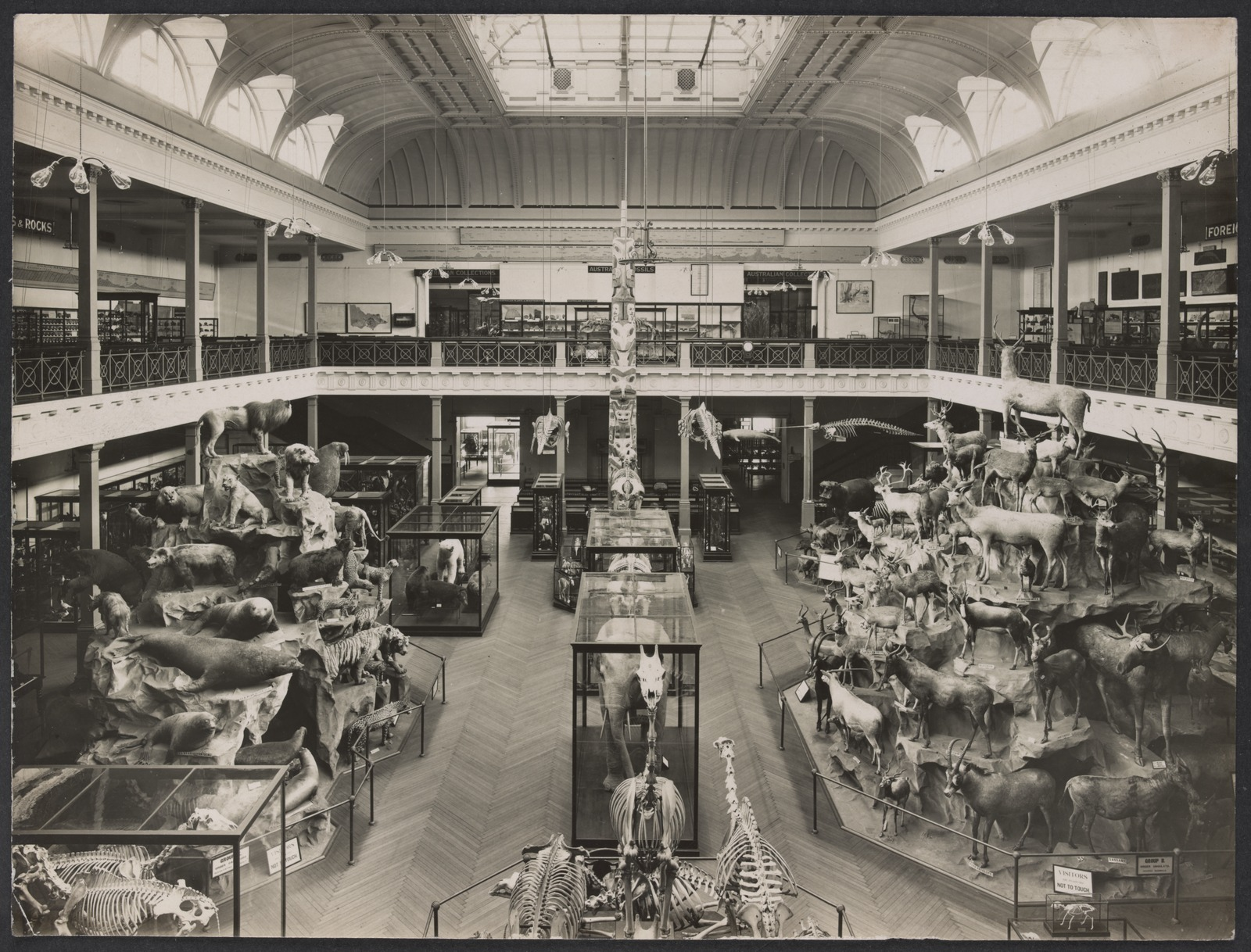
Vertebrate display, McCoy Hall; now the State Library of Victoria's Redmond Barry Reading Room

The museum had its earliest beginnings in the Government Assay Office, which on 9 March 1854, opened some displays in La Trobe Street. In 1858, Prof. Frederick McCoy (Sir Frederick from 1891), who was a professor of natural history at the University of Melbourne, was appointed Director of the National Museum.

Melbourne Museum was originally located (along with the State Library and the old state gallery) in the city block between La Trobe, Swanston, Little Lonsdale and Russell Streets - the nearby Museum underground railway station was originally named after it, although following the move, the station was renamed Melbourne Central. The State Library now uses all the space in that building, the gallery also having moved to the National Gallery of Victoria site on St Kilda Road.

The period in which the Victorian government was led by Rupert Hamer (1972–1981) was one of policy development for museums in Victoria. Hamer's Arts Minister Norman Lacy established a Museums Development Committee consisting of representatives of the Science Museum of Victoria, the National Museum of Victoria and the Ministry for the Arts. It considered such matters as the development of a single City Museum complex (leading eventually to the establishment of the new Melbourne Museum in Carlton) and programs in fields such as social history. The committee also joined with a working party of the Victorian Council of the Arts to develop a comprehensive museums policy for Victoria. Lacy also began the establishment of the Heide Museum of Modern Art with the acquisition of the property Heide II (in Bulleen, east of Melbourne) and a collection of 113 art works from John and Sunday Reed in August 1980. It was officially opened in November 1981. He also developed a proposal for a Museum of Social and Political History at the Old Treasury Building for the Executive Committee of Victoria's 150th Anniversary Celebrations in July 1981 which led to the establishment of the City Museum.

=== 2000–present: Carlton Gardens ===
The current Melbourne Museum is located in Carlton Gardens, alongside the Exhibition Building, on the site of the former Melbourne Exhibition Speedway, which operated from 5 November 1928 until 7 March 1936. The museum was constructed during the period of the Kennett government (1992–1999) and was opened on 21 October 2000 by the Premier of Victoria, Steve Bracks. The new Melbourne Museum included some living organisms within the galleries. The centrepiece of the new building houses the Forest Gallery, an exhibition portraying the temperate forests of eastern Victoria. The Forest Gallery is home to the ongoing Forest Secrets exhibition, which examines the agents of change within the forests.

The Melbourne Museum was one of the venues of Festival Melbourne 2006, a citywide art festival held in conjunction of the 2006 Commonwealth Games, which was held in Melbourne. Among the exhibitions held in the museum were 'Common Goods:Cultures Meet Through Craft', a project of the South Project. It featured crafts made by artists from various Commonwealth countries and 'CARVE:Indigenous carving practices', a series of demonstrations of traditional indigenous carving practices and techniques from Australia, New Zealand and Canada. There was also a producers' market, 'Victorian Producers' Market', where produces from regional Victoria such as wine, cheese and others were sold. A cooking competition, 'Culinary Pro Am of the Commonwealth' was also held between Melbourne chefs, each representing a Commonwealth country. Live actions of the Games were also shown on a large screen on the museum grounds.

== Main exhibits ==
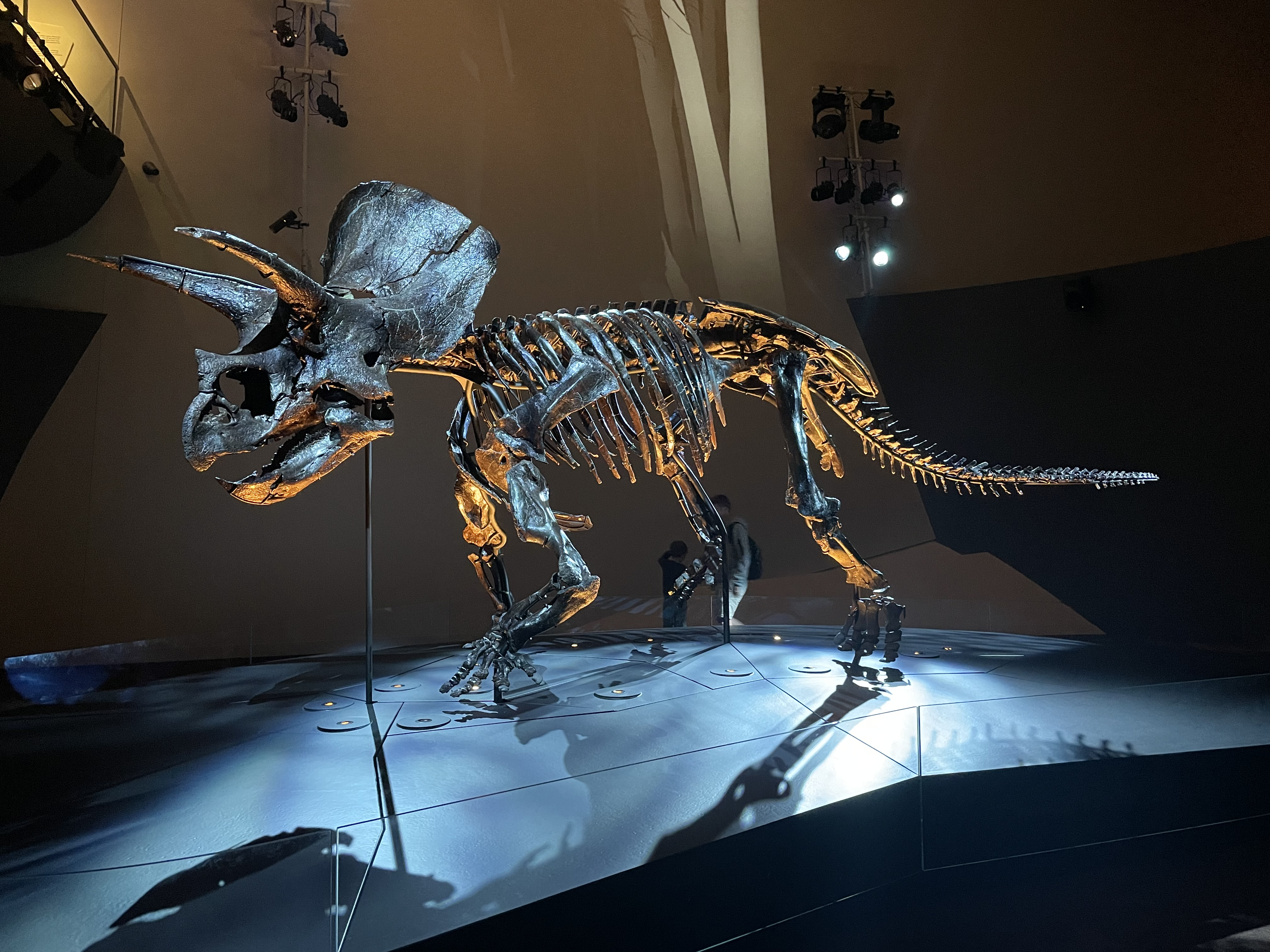
‘Horridus’, the most complete Triceratops fossil known, on display at the Melbourne Museum

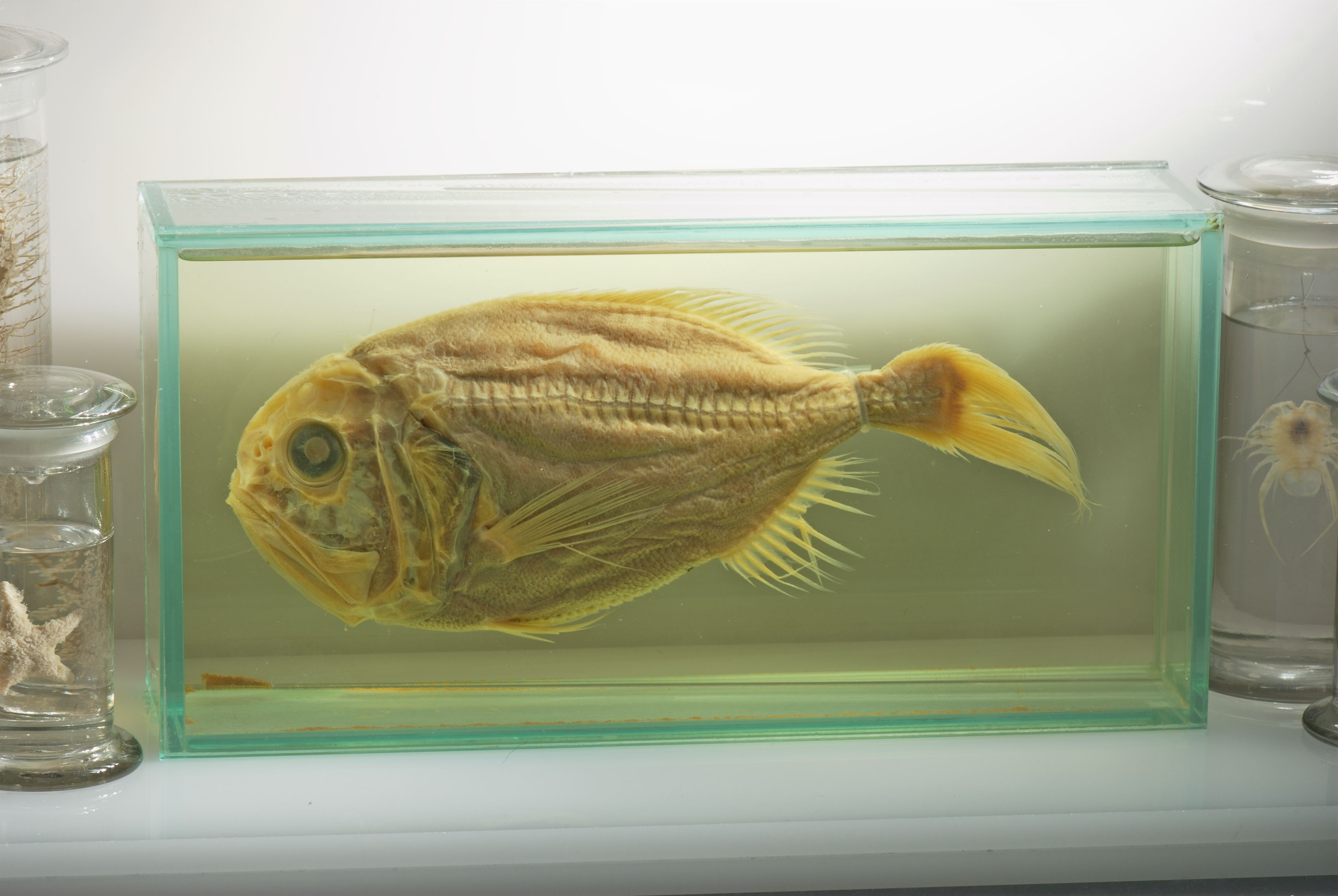
Natural history exhibit at Melbourne Museum (centre specimen is an orange roughy)

The main exhibits include:

- Science and Life Gallery – the museum's natural history wing

- Dinosaur Walk – features fossil mounts including: Tarbosaurus, Mamenchisaurus, Tsintaosaurus, Deinonychus, Pteranodon, Gallimimus, Hypsilophodon, Protoceratops, Megalania, Diprotodon, Genyornis
- 600 Million Years: Victoria Evolves – more prehistoric animals, not all of them native to Victoria, such as Anomalocaris and Muttaburrasaurus (opened 2010)
- Dynamic Earth – geology
- Bugs Alive! – live and preserved invertebrate displays (opened 2004)
- Marine Life: Exploring our Seas – marine biology
- A large skeleton of a pygmy blue whale
- Wild: Amazing Animals in a Changing World – Taxidermy gallery (open 2009–2021). In 2012, the website Bad Taxidermy featured a giant otter specimen in it, which brought it much fame, the museum then selling plush toys of it.
- Horridus – Includes the most complete known specimen of Triceratops (opened 2022). The exhibit occupies the space held by Wild, which closed on January 26, 2021, with the specimens going back into storage for maintenance.
- Evolution Gallery – Featured the exhibition 'Darwin to DNA'. This gallery closed in 2021 to make way for the Horridus exhibition.

- Melbourne Gallery – includes the mounted hide of champion racehorse Phar Lap
- The Melbourne Story – history of Melbourne from the early 19th century through to present day
- Mind and Body Gallery – A gallery regarding the human body. It also features a world first exhibition about the mind called 'Mind: enter the labyrinth'. This gallery closed in 2021.
- Forest Gallery – a living temperate Victorian forest environment, complete with live birds, reptiles, and other fauna
- Bunjilaka Aboriginal Cultural Centre – including galleries with exhibitions by and about the Aboriginal peoples of Victoria
- Te Vainui O Pasifika Gallery – an exhibition which highlights the history and watercraft of Pacific Islanders
- The Pauline Gandel Children's Gallery – hands-on exhibits and learning through play aimed at 0 to 5 year olds
- Touring Hall – is where international touring exhibitions are displayed. A Day In Pompeii which was on display at Melbourne Museum from 26 June to 25 October 2009 was Melbourne Museum's most popular temporary exhibition. Past Touring Hall exhibitions include Hatching the Past: Dinosaur Eggs and Babies (30 May 2008 to 24 August 2008), The Great Wall of China: Dynasties, Dragons and Warriors (23 March 2007 to 22 July 2007), Spirit of the Games: the Opening Ceremony revealed (18 March to 23 July 2006) and Dinosaurs from China (2005).
- Public spaces – outside the main galleries are various displays relating to Victoria's and Australia's history

== IMAX Melbourne ==
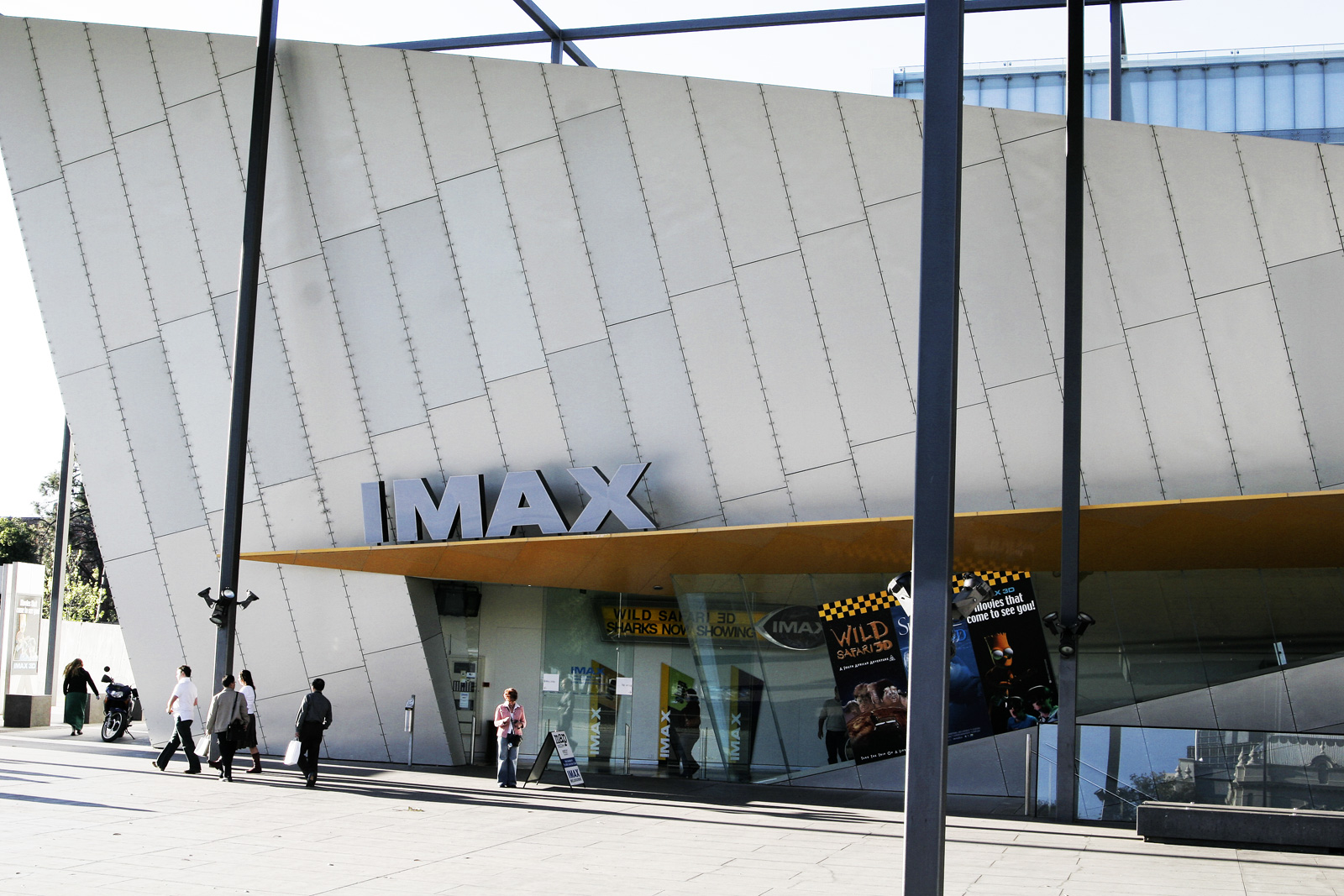
IMAX Melbourne Museum was the world's largest screen until the opening of the Traumpalast IMAX in Leonberg in 2021.

Located eight-storeys beneath Melbourne Museum, IMAX Melbourne opened in 1998 with the world's largest screen measuring 31 m × 28 m (102 ft × 92 ft). It has been owned and operated by Museums Victoria since 2004. The cinema was closed for a month in 2013 to oversee renovations. A new a dual 4K Laser projection system, the only of its kind in Australia was installed, its sound system upgraded and screen enlarged to 32 m × 23 m (105 ft × 75 ft). When IMAX Sydney was demolished 2016, IMAX Melbourne became the largest operating IMAX screen in the world. It held the title until the Traumpalast IMAX in Leonberg, Germany was completed in 2021. With the new Sydney IMAX now completed, IMAX Melbourne still remains the largest IMAX in the Southern Hemisphere by screen size and capacity, with seating for 461 patrons (including seating for 25 Premium VIPs) verses 430 seats in Sydney.

== Awards ==
The Melbourne Museum was one of Denton Corker Marshall's award-winning projects. It won the RACV Award for major tourist attraction, where it received 1,428,238 visitors during the years 2010–2011. In March 2012, the Qantas Australian Tourism Awards was held in Cairns, where the Melbourne Museum was represented for Victoria on a national level. Melbourne Museum's Science and Life gallery was honoured with the Large Permanent Exhibition Award during 2010–2011. They have also received awards from the Royal Australian Institute of Architects (RAIA) for their contributions to Australian architecture.

== See also ==
- H. L. White Collection

== Gallery ==
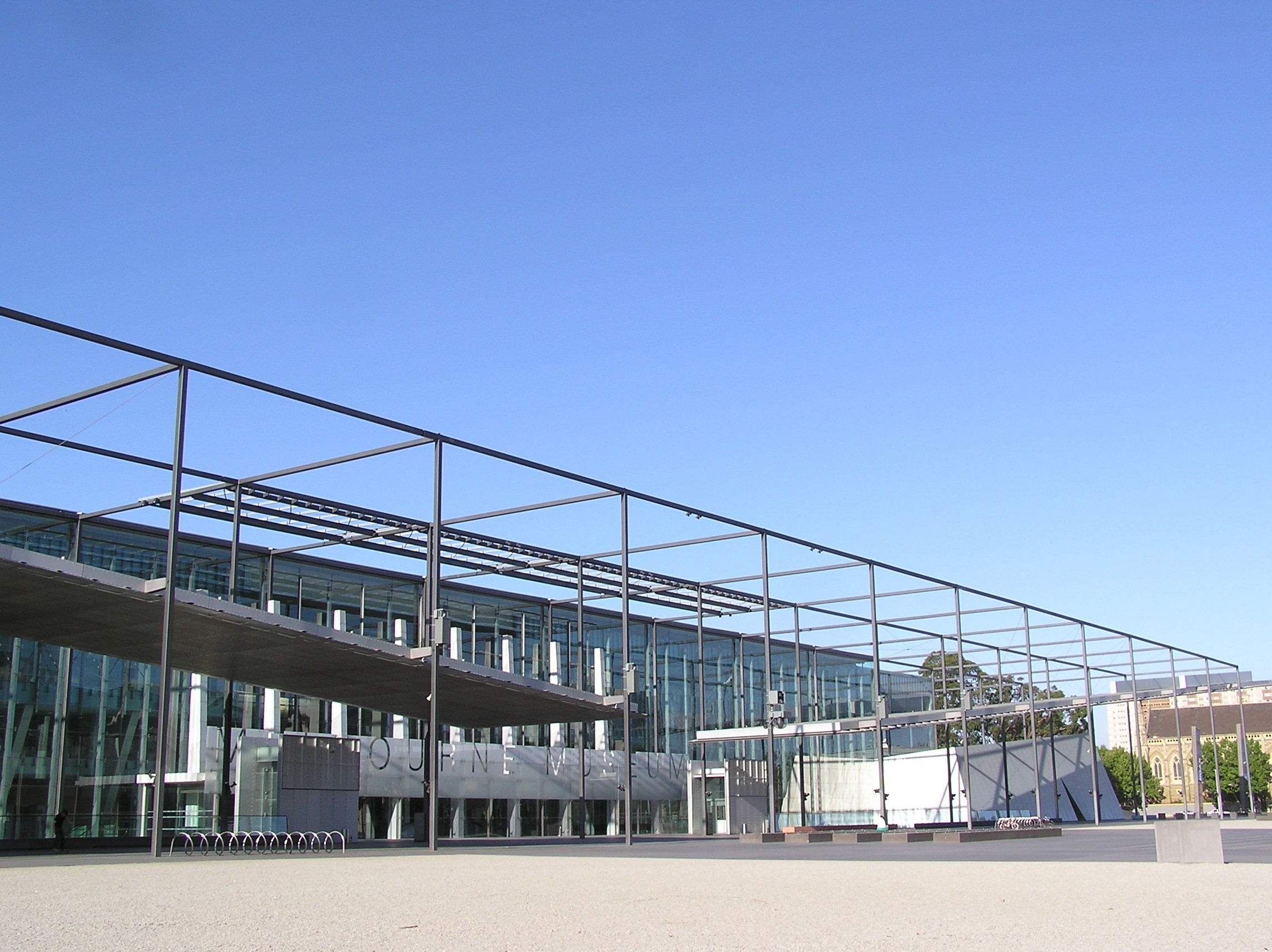
Front entrance

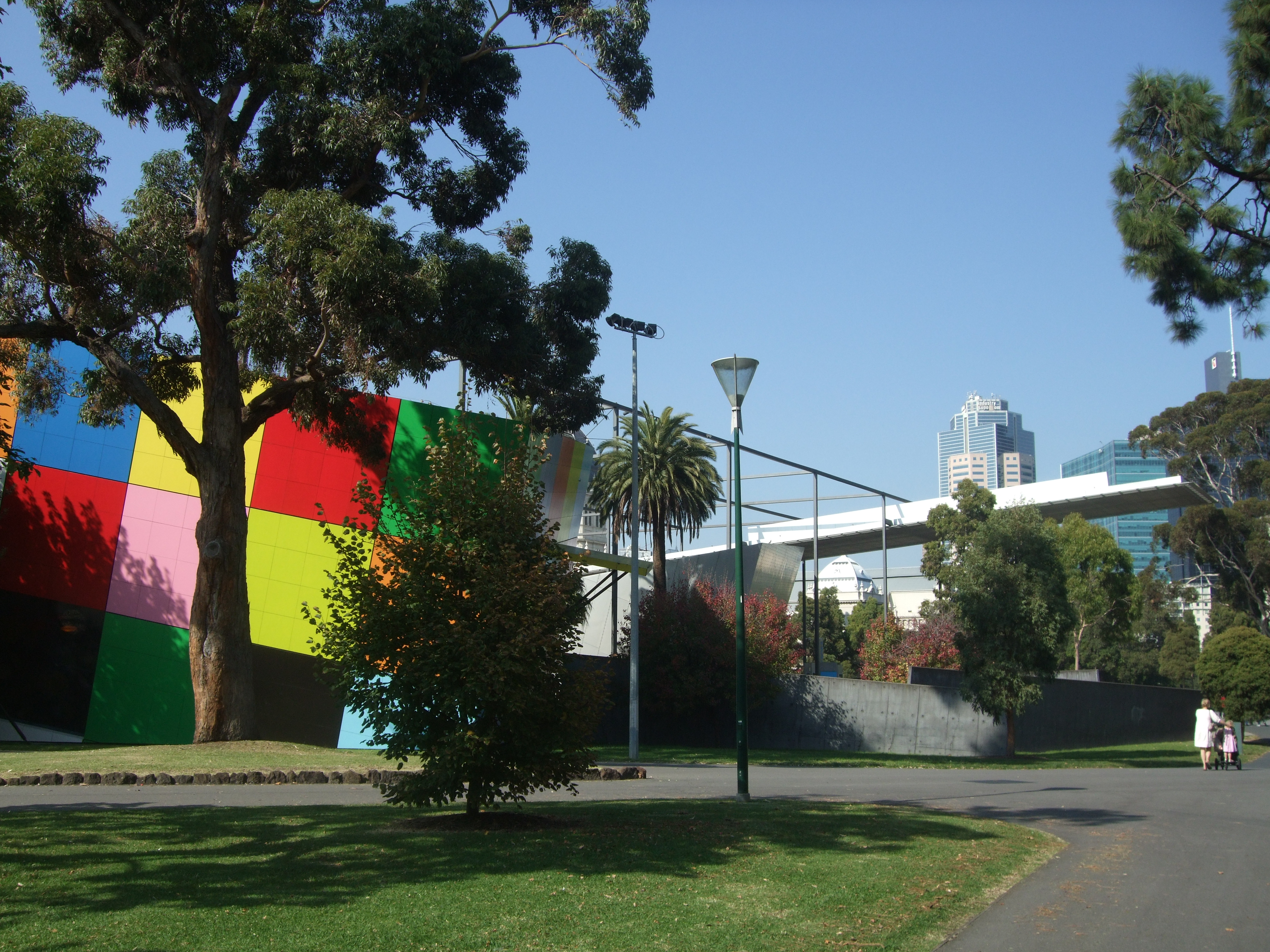
Children's area

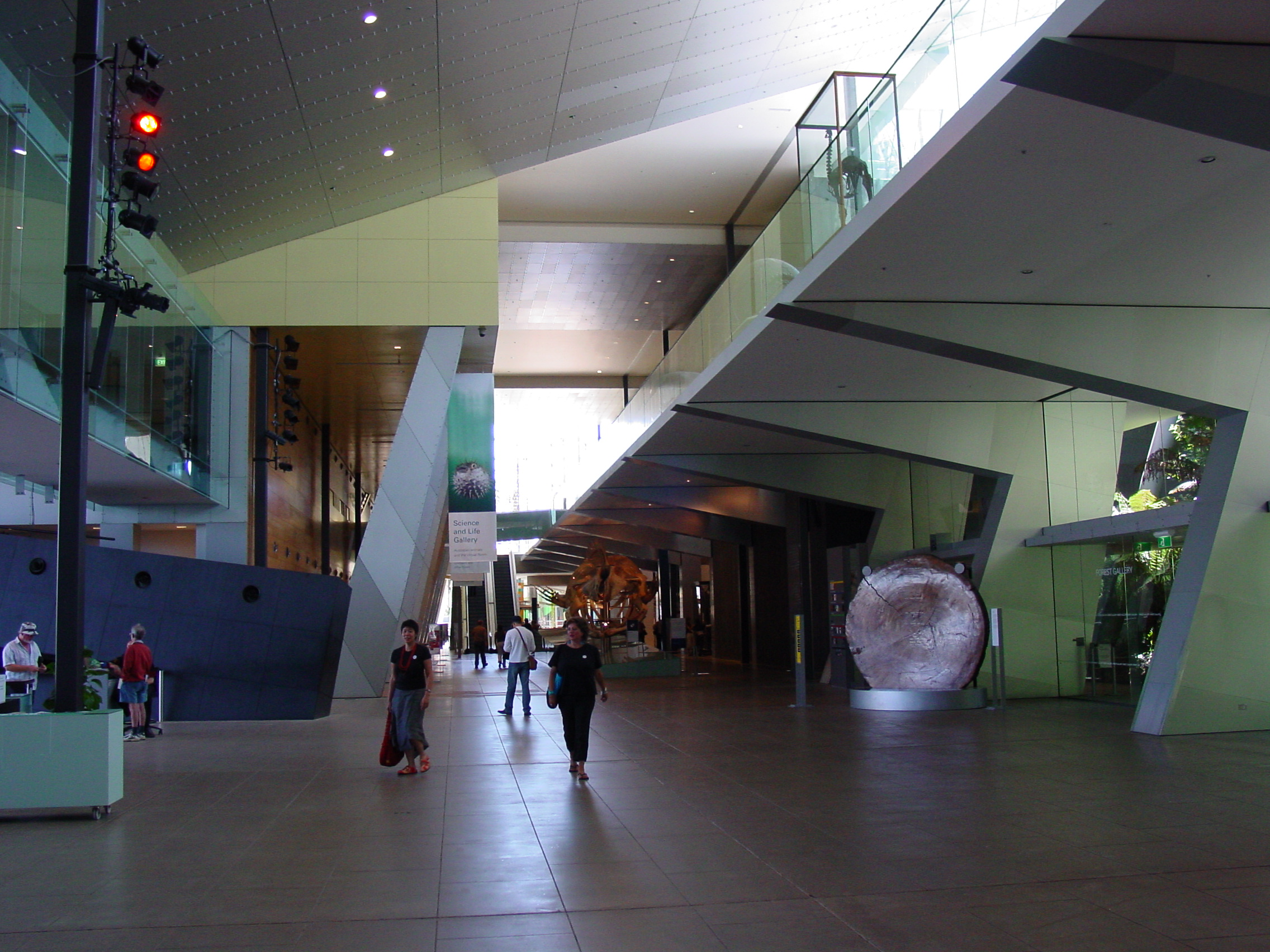
Museum hall

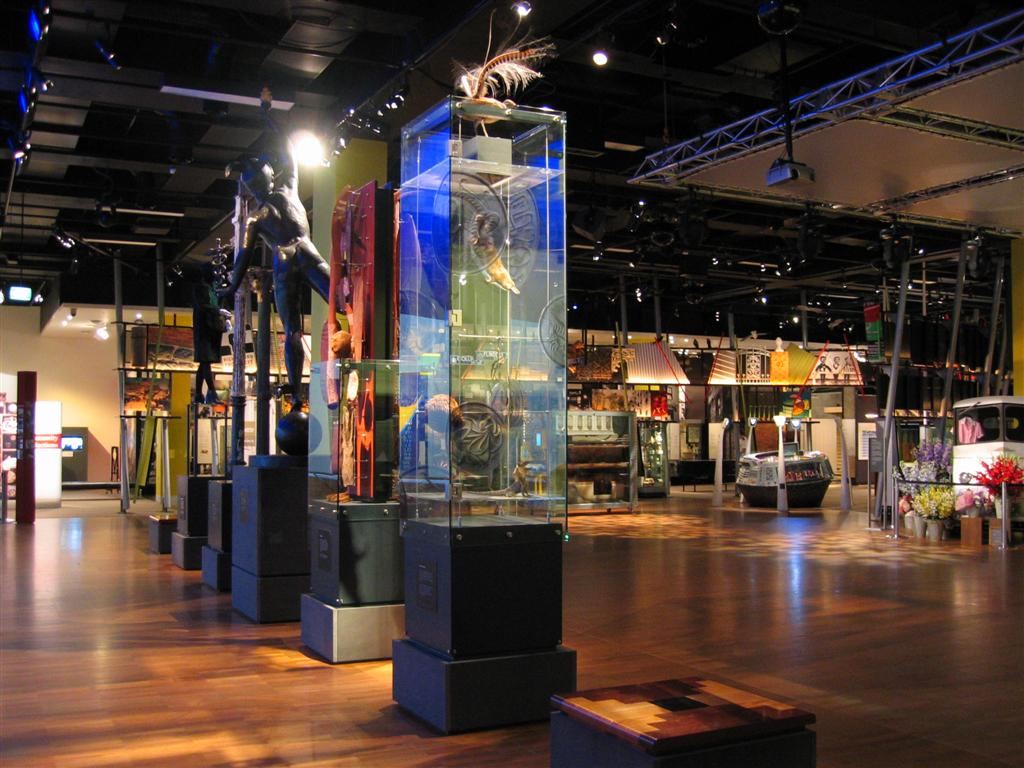
Exhibition space

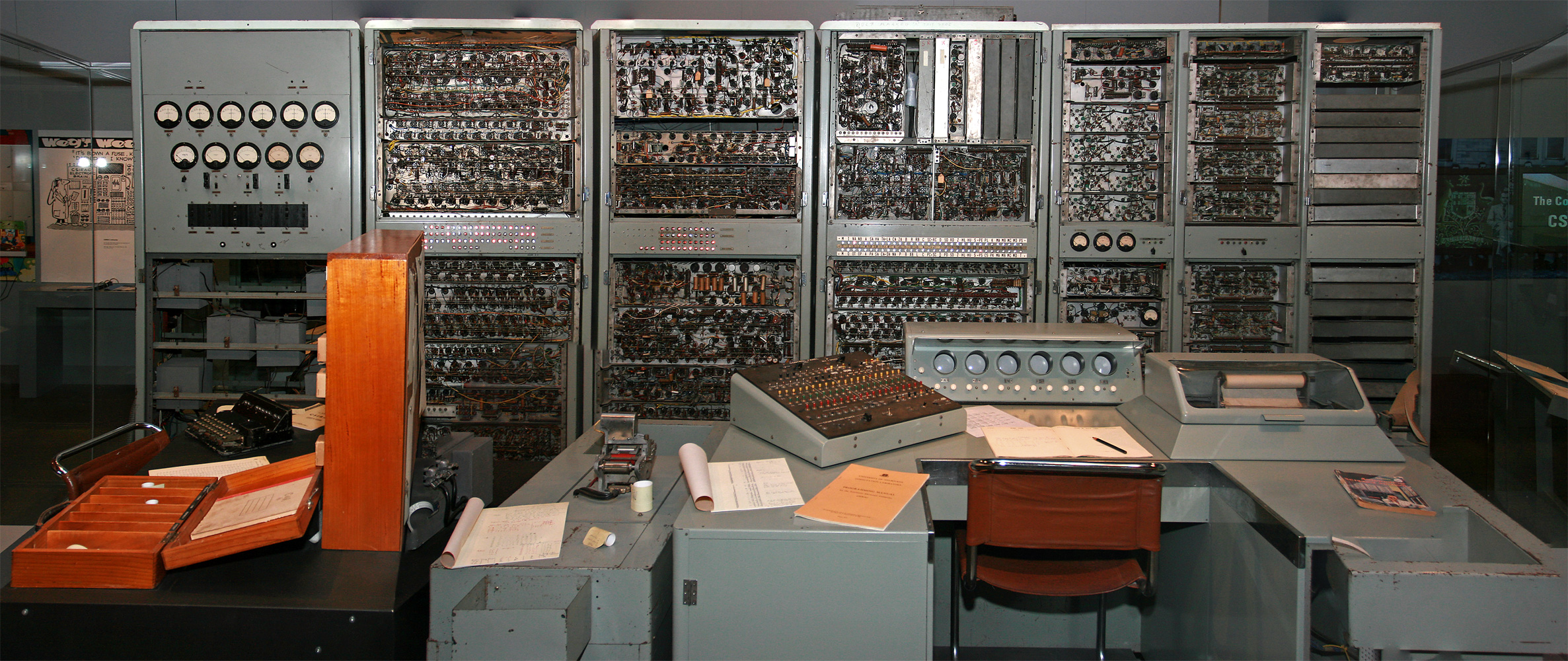
CSIRAC, Australia's first digital computer
