= Denton Corker Marshall =

Architecture practice established in Melbourne in 1972

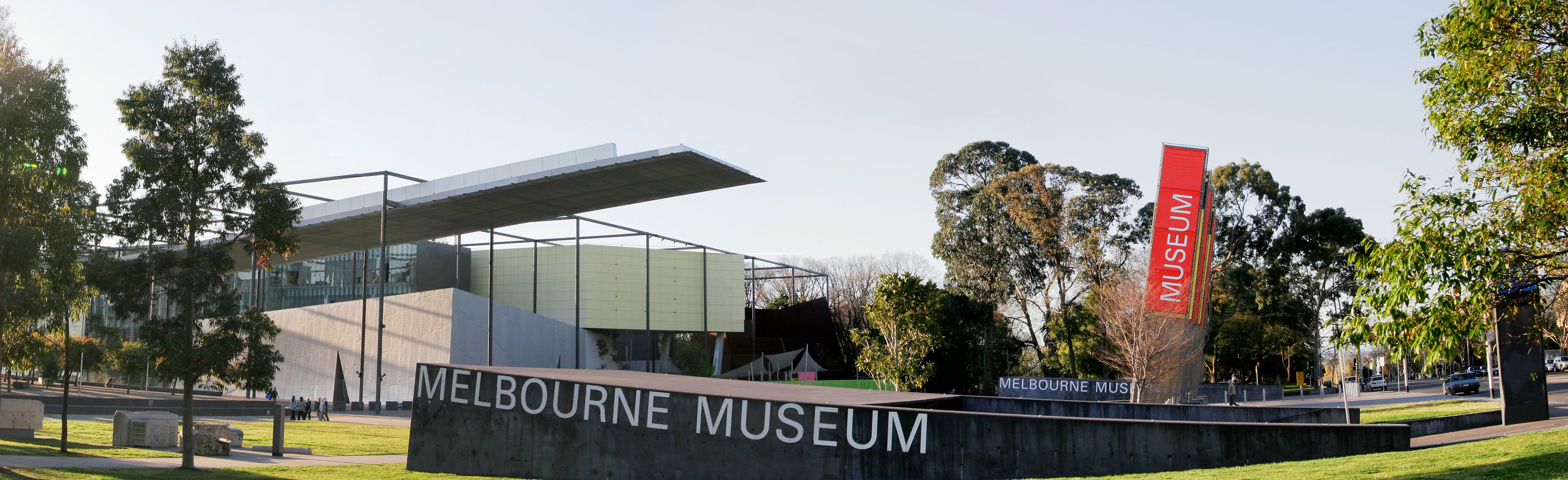
- Melbourne Museum in Melbourne, Australia; designed by Denton Corker Marshall.

Practice information
- Firm type: Architecture and urban design
- Founders: John Denton; Bill Corker; Barrie Marshall
- Founded: 1972
- Location: Melbourne, London, Manchester and Jakarta

Significant works and honors
- Buildings: Melbourne Museum, Manchester Civil Justice Centre, Australian Pavilion
- Awards: RAIA Gold Medal: John Denton, Bill Corker and Barrie Marshall (1996), Robin Boyd Award 1999 & 2000, Victorian Architecture Medal 2001

Website
- dentoncorkermarshall.com

Denton Corker Marshall (DCM) is an international architecture practice based in Melbourne, Australia.

== History ==
Denton Corker Marshall (DCM) was established in Melbourne, Victoria, in 1972. It was founded by architects John Denton, Bill Corker, and Barrie Marshall.

== Description and work ==
While Melbourne remains the design base, the firm has additional practices in London, Manchester, and Jakarta, with over 510 projects in 37 different countries.

In Australia, Denton Corker Marshall is best known for landmark buildings such as the Melbourne Museum, which features a "blade" section of roof rising to 35 metres, enclosing a small rainforest, the Melbourne Exhibition Centre, which has a roof resembling a giant aircraft wing, and the Melbourne Gateway and Bolte Bridge, both part of the CityLink project. The firm's work in Australia has been frequently and variously described as modernist, minimalist, sculptural and heroic. The practice has been consistently publicised in awards series, news and magazines in the past decades in addition to being covered in several monographic publications.

Other projects by the practice include the multi-award-winning Manchester Civil Justice Centre, a new visitors' centre at Stonehenge, Sydney's Governor Phillip Tower, the Museum of Sydney, extensions to the Australian War Memorial and Australian embassies in Tokyo and Beijing. The Australian Embassy in Beijing was the practice's first China project, establishing the practice's strong association with China over three decades. In recent years Denton Corker Marshall’s work has extended to more than 20 cities in Asia. In 2015, Denton Corker Marshall were selected to build the Australian Pavilion for the Venice Biennale.

== People ==
In 2005, John Denton was appointed as the first State Architect for Victoria for a two-year term. As of September 2021 he is chairperson of the board at the Australian Centre for Contemporary Art (ACCA). He is a Life Fellow of the Royal Australian Institute of Architects (RAIA), and in 1996 received the RAIA Gold Medal.

== Notable projects ==
Completed	Project name	Location	Award	Notes
1984	1 Collins Street	Melbourne, Victoria	RAIA Merit Award (1985); RAIA William Wardell Medal (1986)	
1987	Botanical Hotel	Melbourne		
1987	Emery Vincent Office	Melbourne		
1987	91-97 William Street	Melbourne		
1989	TAC House, Exhibition Street	Melbourne		
1989	Carpark, 114-128 Flinders Street	Melbourne		
1991	101 Collins Street	Melbourne		
1993	Governor Phillip Tower	Sydney	RAIA National Commercial Architecture Award (1994); RAIA NSW Chapter Sir John Sulman Medal (1994)	
1994	Adelphi Hotel	Flinders Lane, Melbourne	RAIA National President's Award (1993)	
1995	Museum of Sydney	Sydney		
1996	Melbourne Convention and Exhibition Centre			
1996	Southbank Promenade	Melbourne	AILA Project Award (Civic Design) (1990)	
1997	Grand Arbour	South Bank Parklands, Brisbane		
1997	Pyrmont Bay Park, Stage 2	Pyrmont, Sydney	Walter Burley Griffin Award for Urban Design, 1997; Civic Design Merit Award, 1997 (NSW)	
1999	CityLink (Western Link)	Kensington, Victoria		
1999	Bolte Bridge	Melbourne Docklands		
1999	Melbourne Museum	Carlton Gardens, Melbourne	Sir Zelman Cowen Award for Public Architecture, (2001); Victorian Architecture Medal, (2001)	
1999	Sheep Farm House	Kyneton, Victoria	RAIA Robin Boyd Award (joint winner) (1999)	
1999	CommSec Tower	George Street, Sydney		
2000	Cape Schank Residence	Victoria	RAIA Robin Boyd Award (2000)	
2005	Herald and Weekly Times Tower	Flinders Street, Melbourne		
2005	Webb Bridge	Melbourne Docklands	RAIA Joseph Reed Award for Urban Design (2005)	
2005	Phillip Island (Marshall) House	Phillip Island, Victoria		
2005	Ernst & Young Plaza	Flinders Street, Melbourne		
2005	Sensis Headquarters	Queen Victoria Village, Melbourne		
2005	ANZAC Hall, Australian War Memorial	Canberra	Sir Zelman Cowen Award for Public Architecture, (2005)	
2006	Brisbane Square	Brisbane, Queensland		
2007	Manchester Civil Justice Centre	Manchester, England	Green Major Project of the Year in the UK Green Construction Awards for International Architecture (2007); RAIA National Jørn Utzon Award for International Architecture (2007); RIBA Sustainability Award (2008)	
2009	1 New York Street	Manchester, England		
2013	Stonehenge Visitor Centre	Wiltshire, England	RIBA South West Regional Award (2014); Australian Institute of Architects Jorn Utzon award for International Architecture (2015); Michael Middleton Civic Trust Special Award (UK) (2016)	
2014	Faculty of Engineering and Information Technology, University of Technology Sydney	Broadway, Sydney		
2015	Australian Pavilion	Venice, Italy		

== Gallery ==
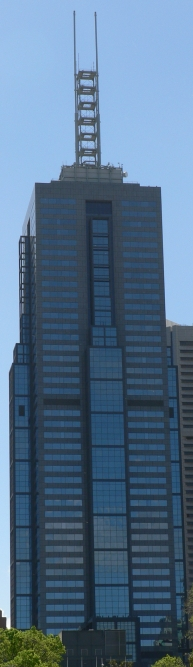
101 Collins Street, Melbourne

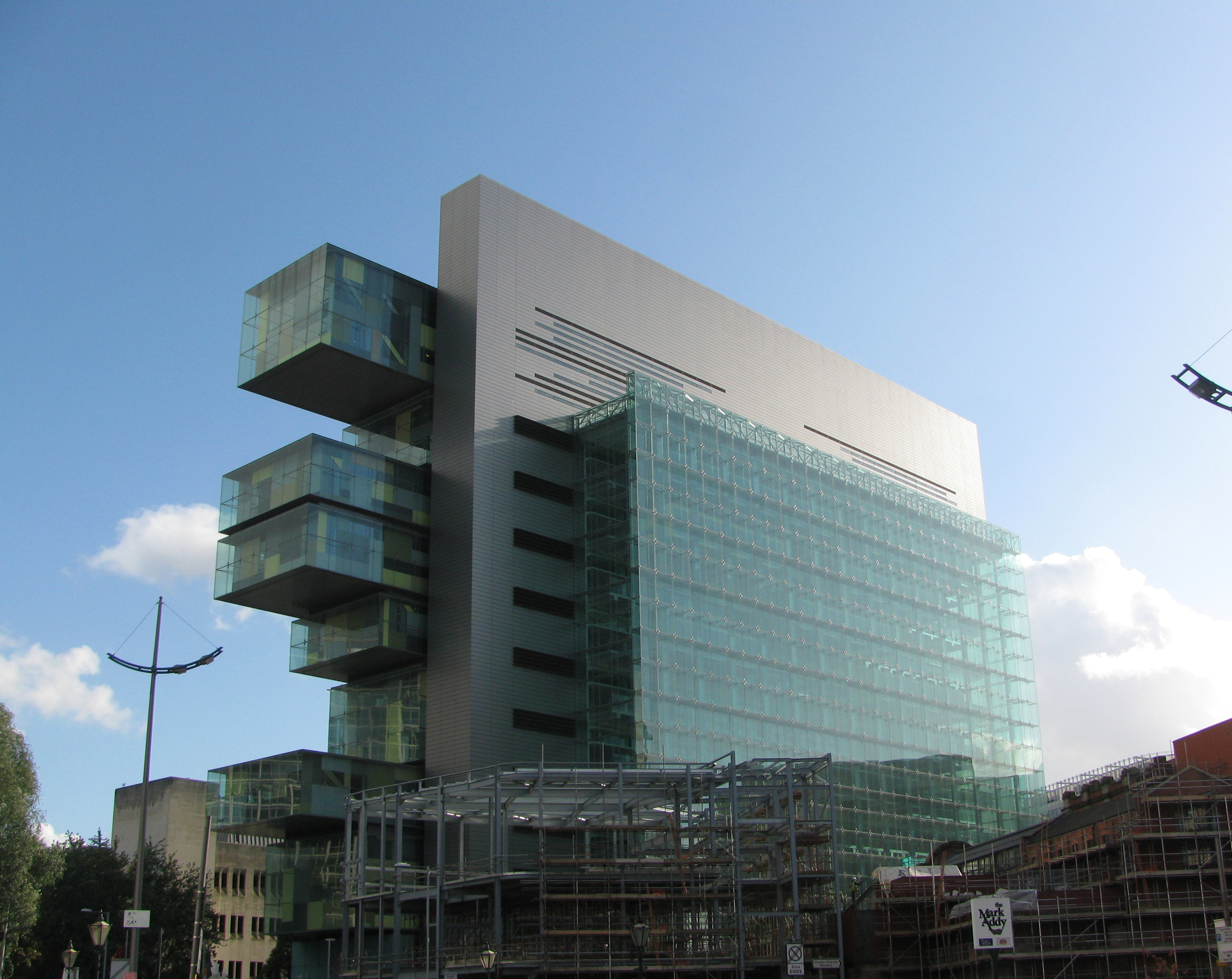
Manchester Civil Justice Centre, Manchester

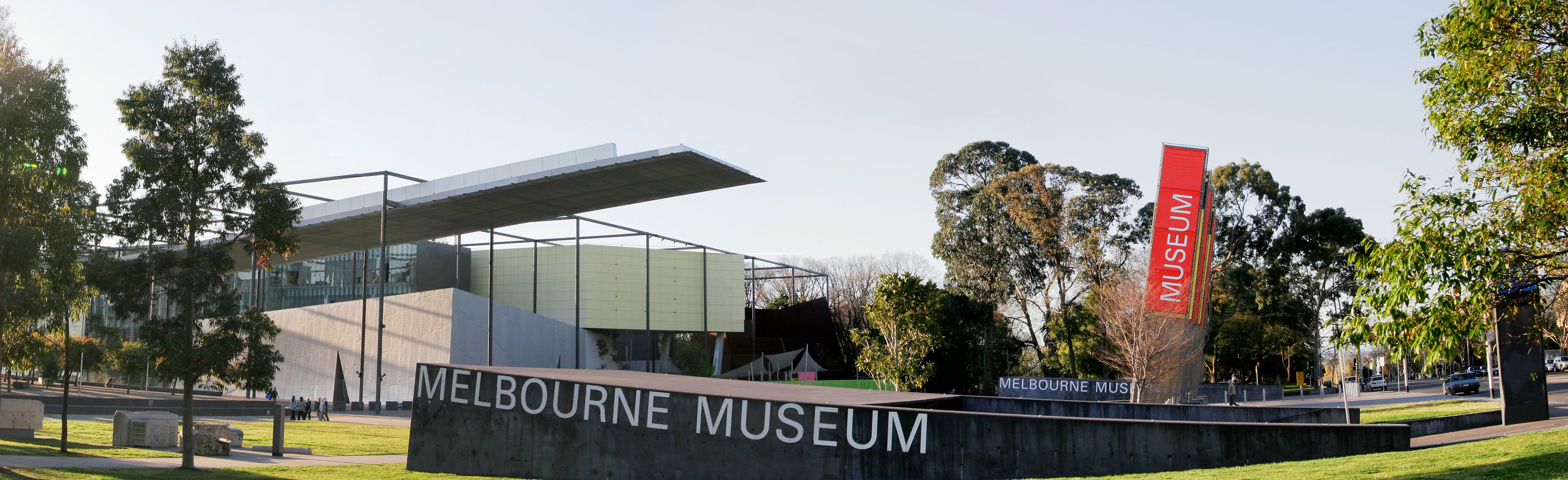
Melbourne Museum

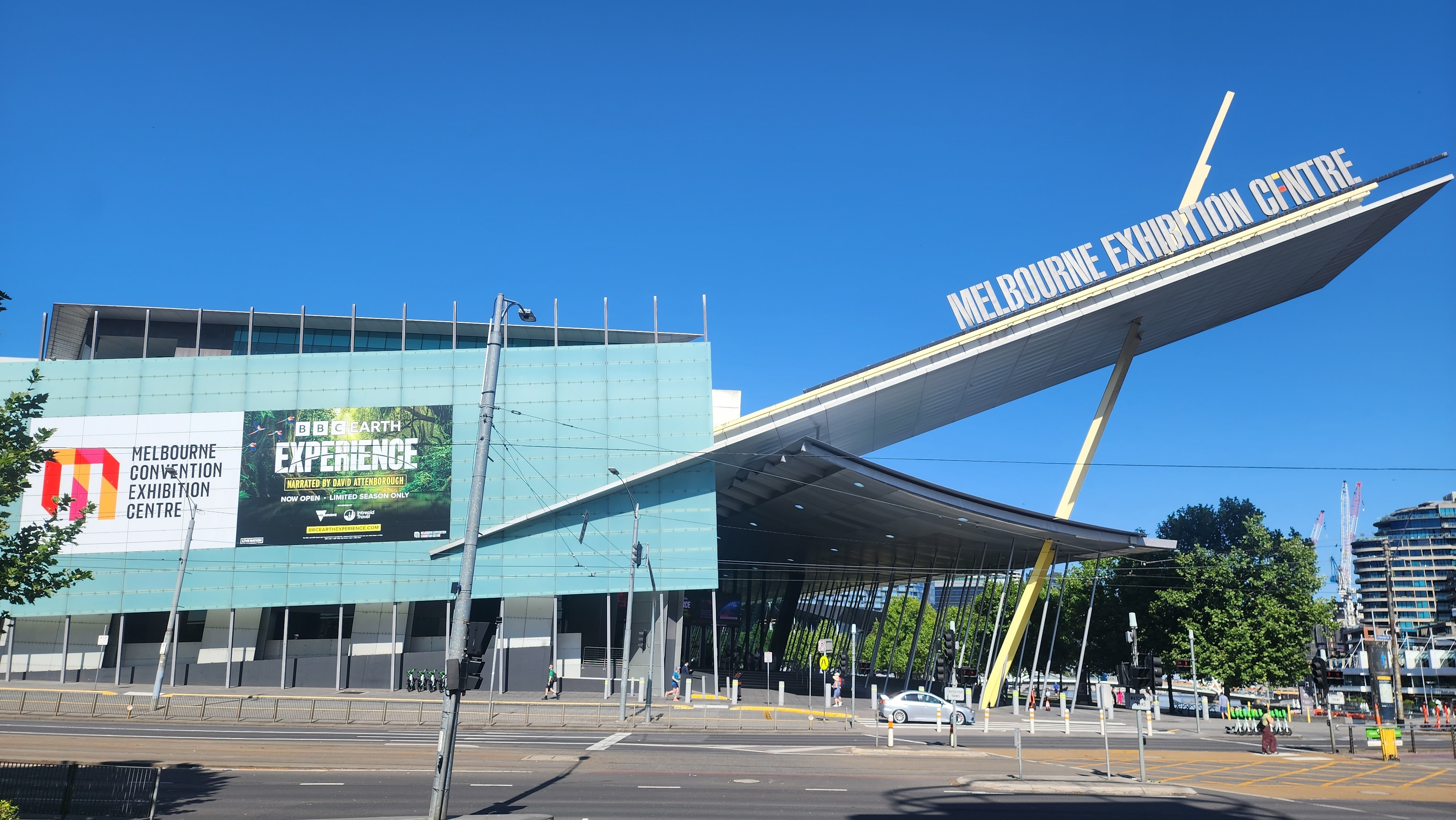
Melbourne Exhibition Centre

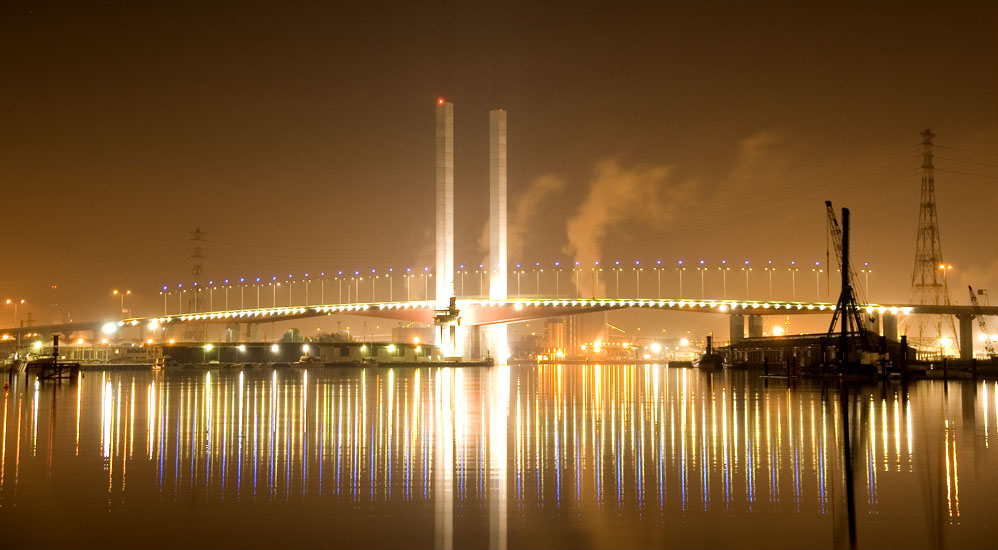
Bolte Bridge at Night, Melbourne

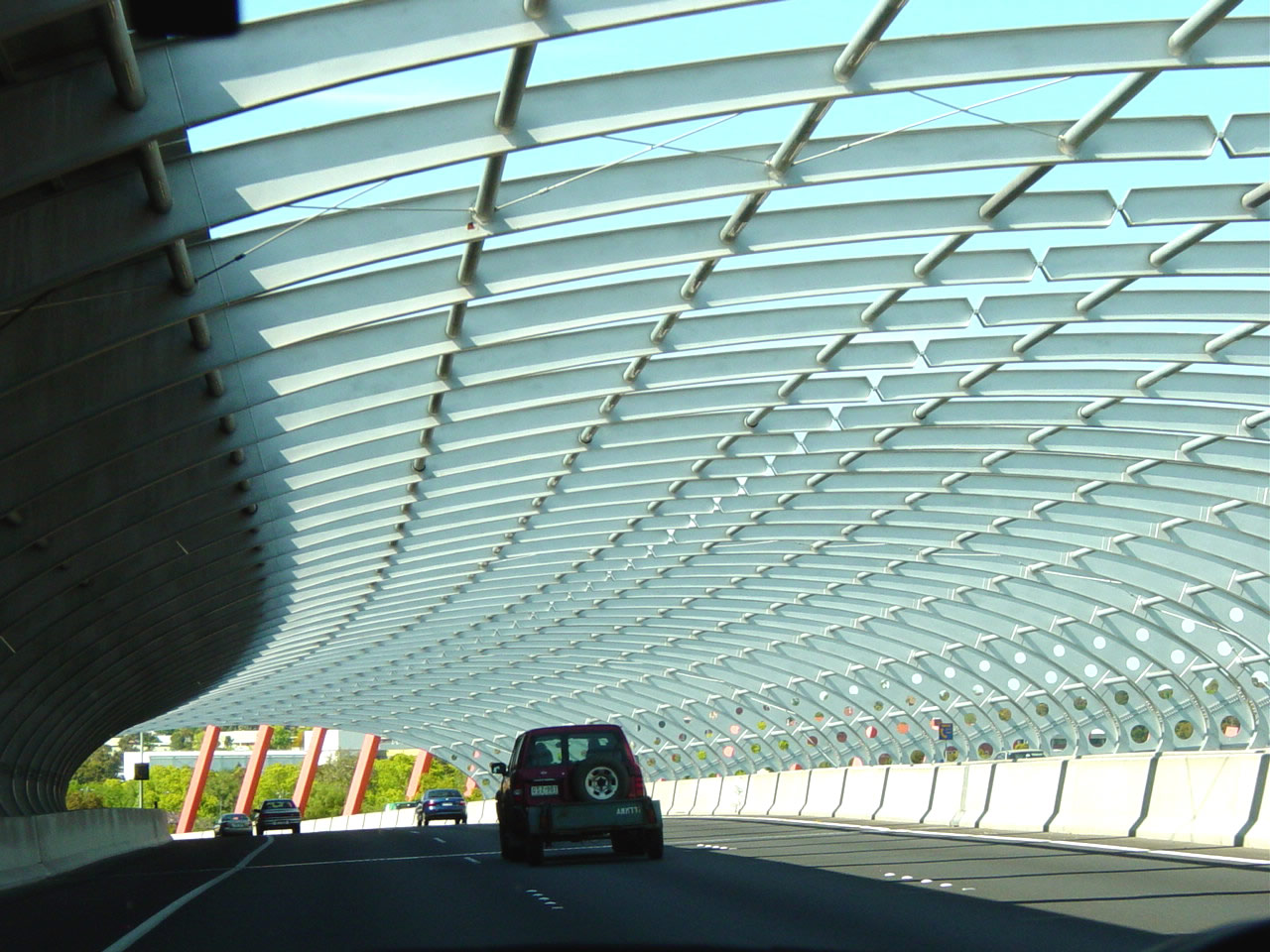
Citylink sound tube, Melbourne

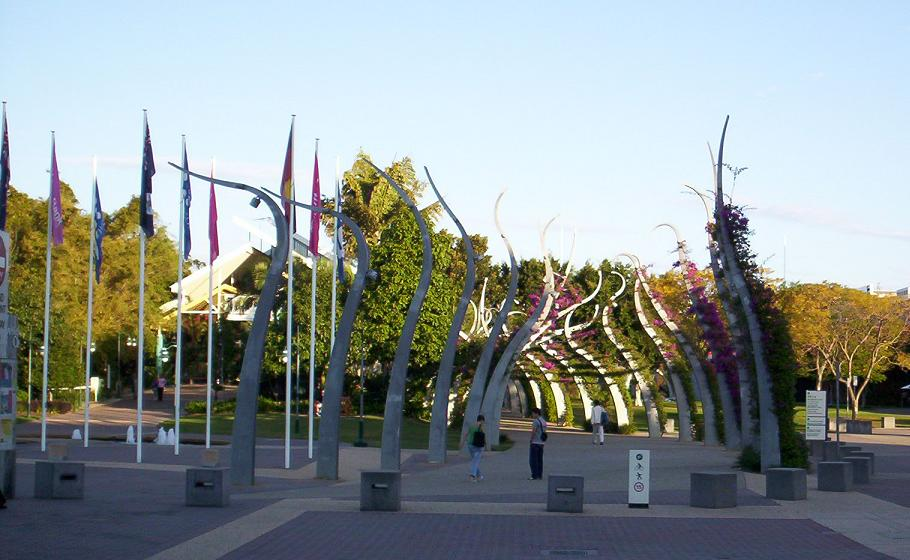
Grand Arbour, Southbank Parklands, Brisbane

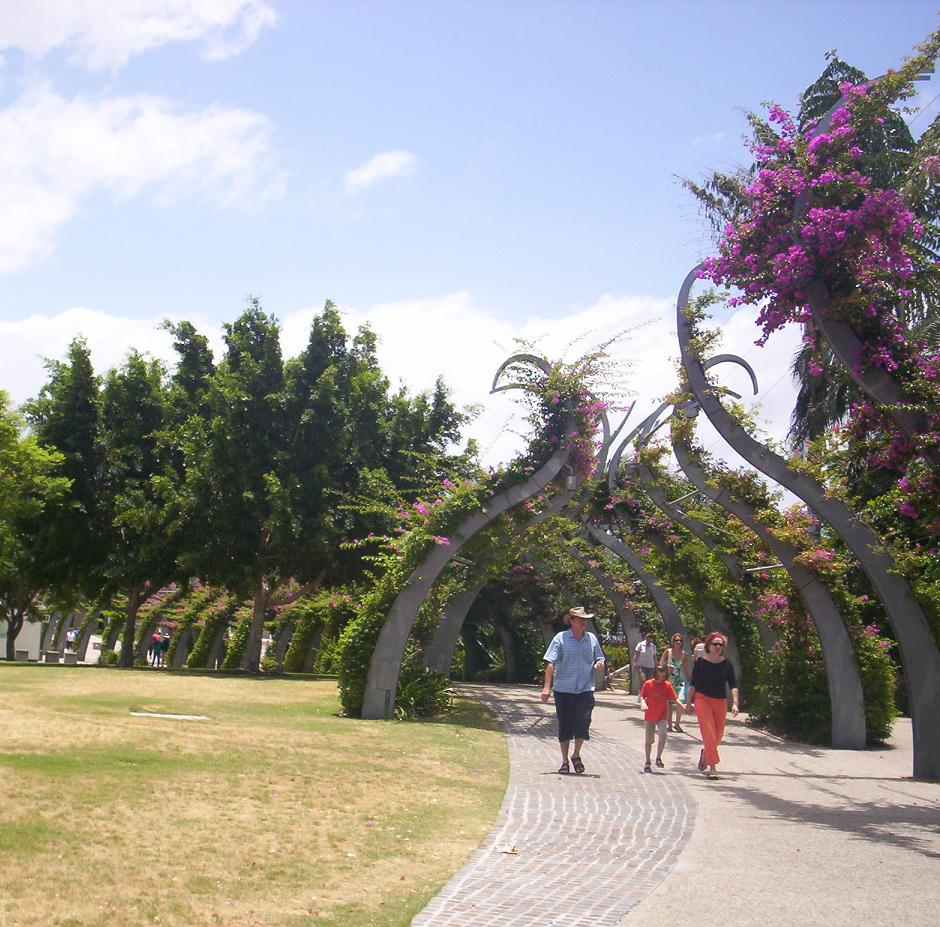
Grand Arbour, Southbank Parklands, Brisbane

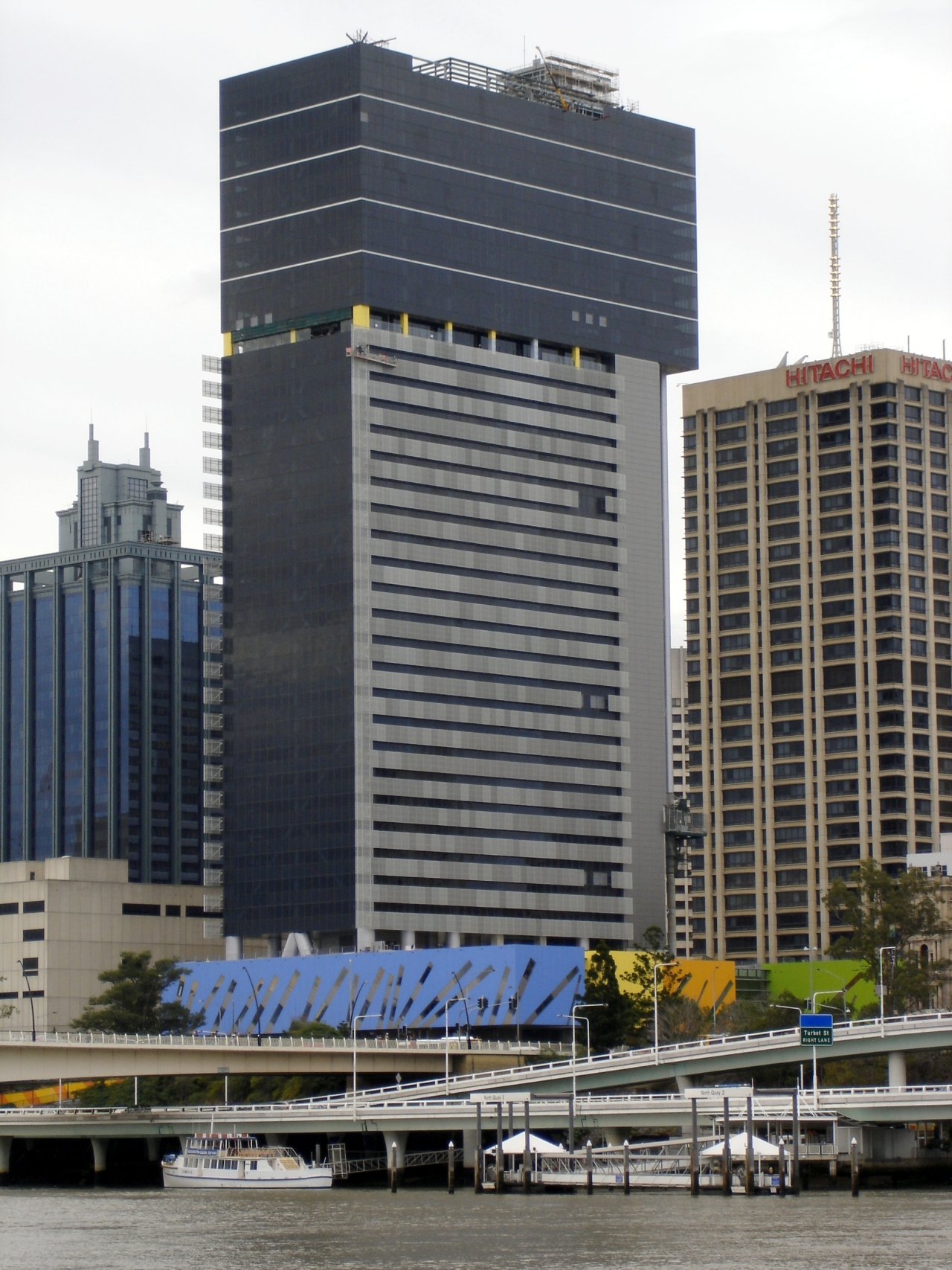
Brisbane Square, during construction

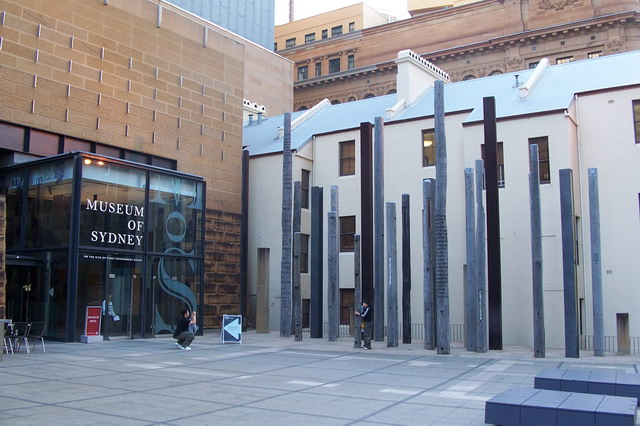
Museum of Sydney, Sydney

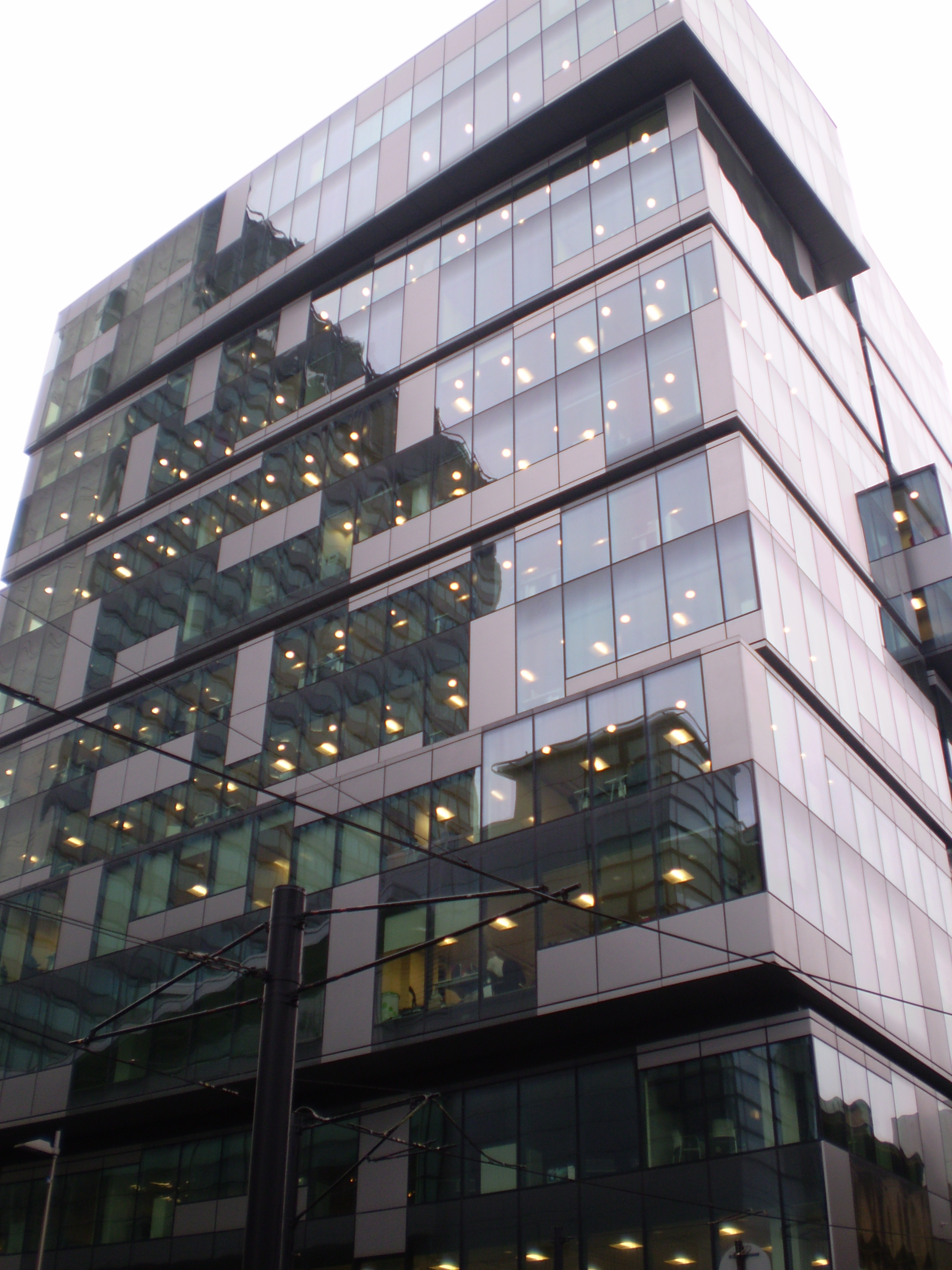
1 New York Street, Manchester 2009

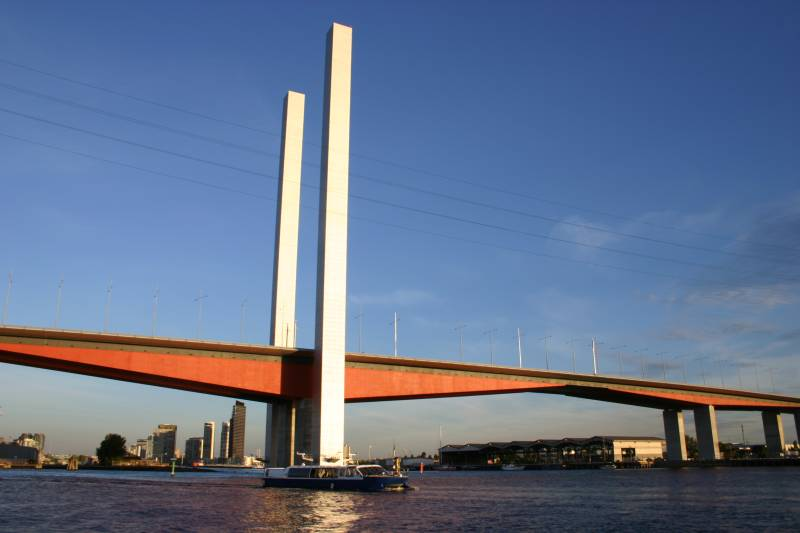
Bolte Bridge, Melbourne.

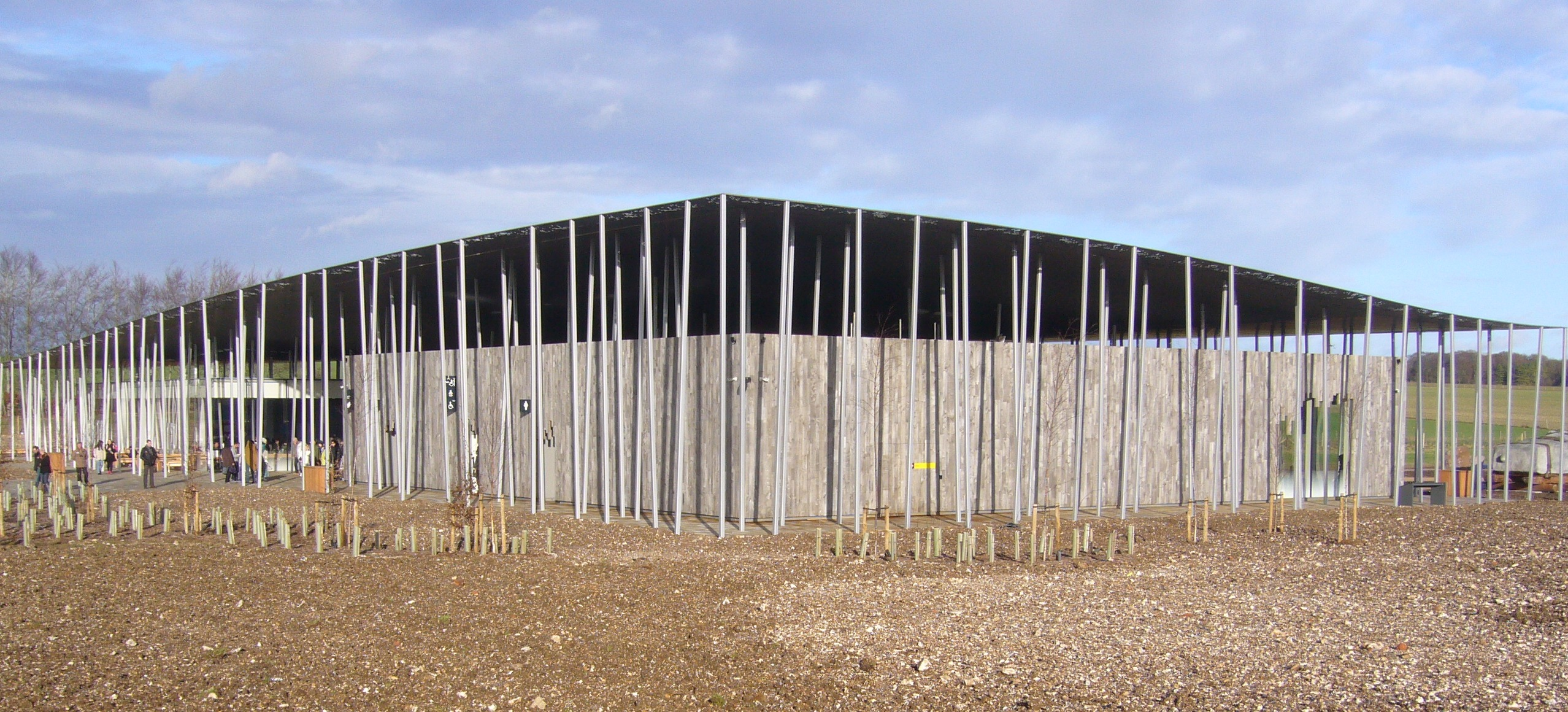
Stonehenge visitors' centre, just off the A360 road in Wiltshire.

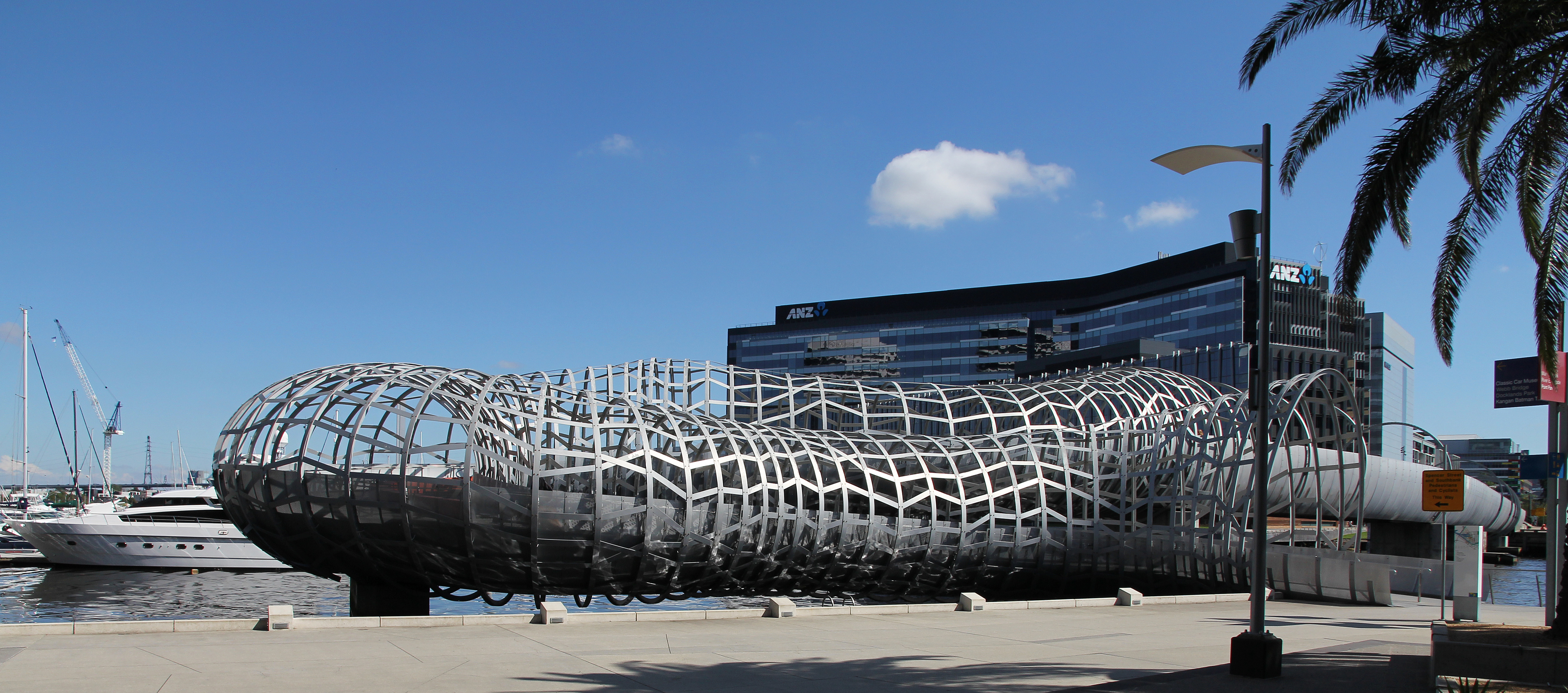
Webb Bridge, Melbourne Docklands

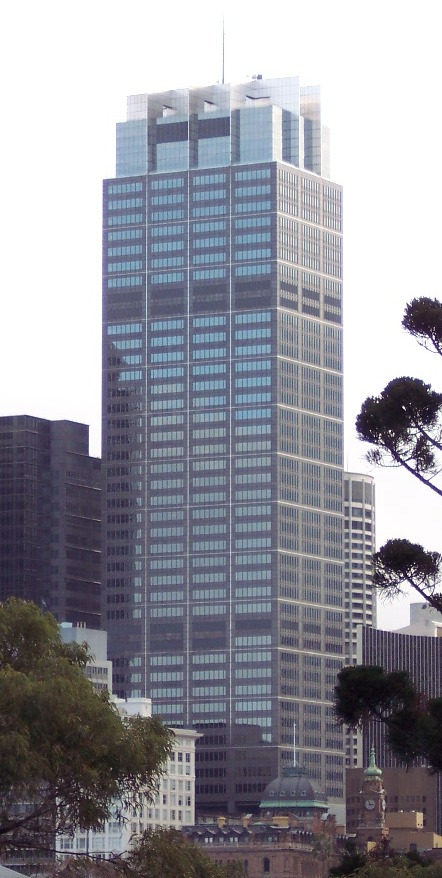
Governor Phillip Tower, Sydney

== See also ==
- Architecture of Australia
