= 222 Exhibition Street (TAC House) =

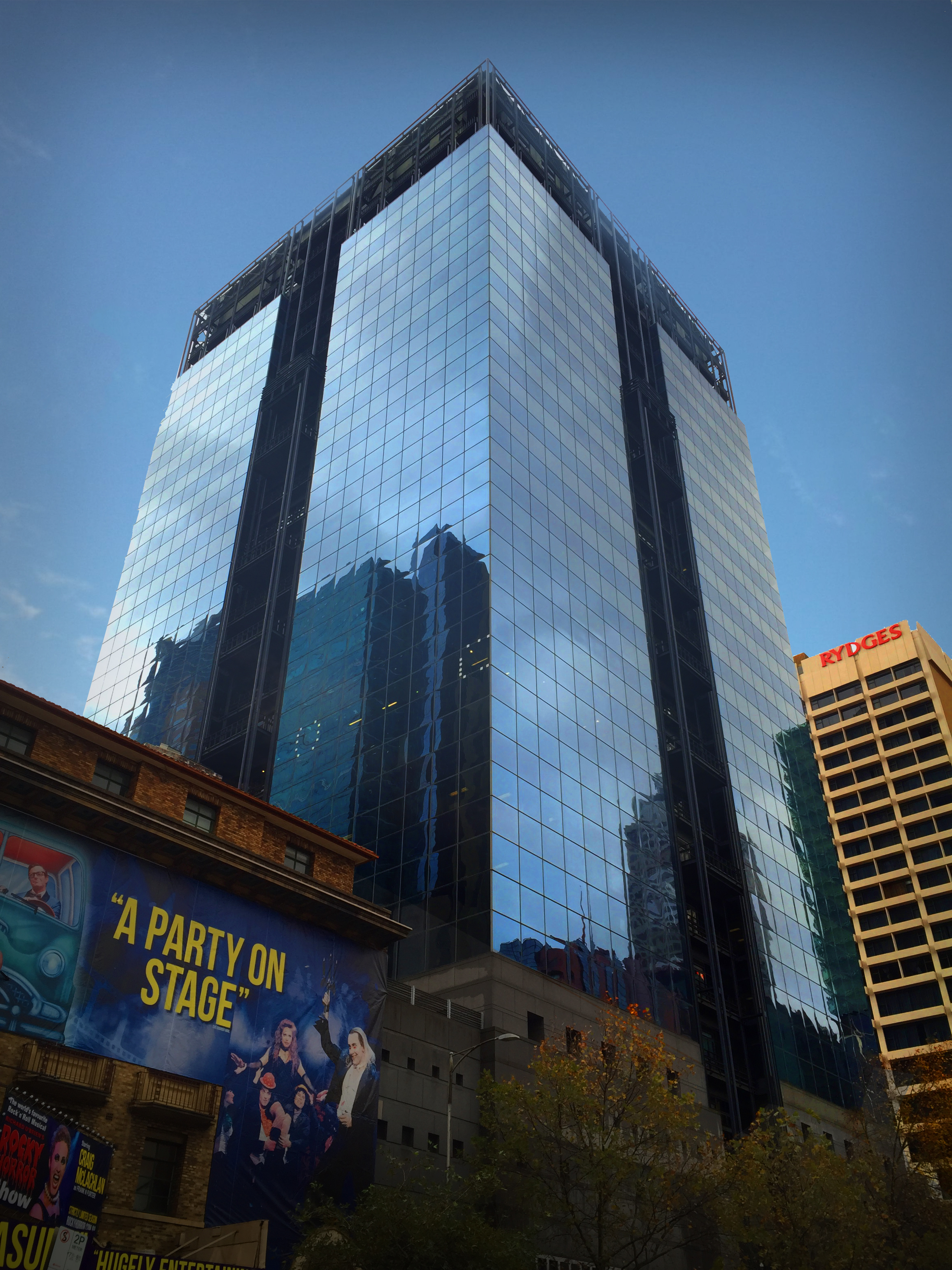
- Exhibition Street view of TAC House
- Interactive map of the 222 Exhibition Street (TAC House) area

General information
- Type: Office and Residential
- Architectural style: PostModern
- Location: 222 Exhibition Street, Melbourne, Victoria, Australia
- Coordinates: 37.810799°S 144.970260°E
- Completed: 1988
- Renovated: 2010

Height
- Height: 328 ft (100 m)

Technical details
- Floor count: 26
- Lifts/elevators: 10

Design and construction
- Architecture firm: Denton Corker Marshall
- Developer: Carringbush (Vic) Pty Ltd
- Quantity surveyor: Rider Hunt Melbourne
- Awards: RAIA Merit Award New Commercial, 1989

Renovating team
- Architect: Mills Gorman Architects

222 Exhibition Street (TAC House) is a 26 level office building in Melbourne, Australia. Constructed 1986-88 and designed by Denton Corker Marshall, 222 Exhibition Street is a notable example of Postmodernism by a firm that was later to gain international fame.

== Description ==
The square tower is articulated by four blue glazed corner elements separated by a recessed balcony grillage which extends to a three level grillage at the top of the building. The tower sits on a dark grey podium containing car-parking, retail and residential development.

Offices and car parking dominate the form of the building. The offices had to be a tower of rather squat proportions (the market stipulated an efficient forty square meter floor plate) surmounting a car park (built largely above ground to reduce excavation costs) and covering as much of the site as possible (to minimise the number of parking levels).

To overcome the chunky proportions of the resultant ‘tower’, Denton Corker Marshall inflated the scale to disrupt any accurate reading of its size. They did this by dividing the mass of the building into four slender towers seated by a cruciform structural steel armature, and sheathing them in mirror glass to deny any reading of the intervening floor levels.

The base of 222 Exhibition Street discreetly conceals a ground hugging 500 space car park hidden by a skin of shops. The stone-faced base forms the street elevation, defines the building/street alignment and establishes the dignified entry. Residential development of seven (four storeys) townhouses are at the rear of the project. Locating at Punch Lane. In 2010, the interior of the TAC House was renovated by local architecture firm Mills Gorman Architects, notably refurbishing the lobby, removing the original (inaccessible) Juliet balconies on either side, and inserting a cafe and reception desk instead.

== Key influences and design approach ==
It was one of Denton Corker Marshall’s earliest investigations into the manipulation of the effects of scale in office buildings. Here they had to contend with conflicting scale requirements: the planners expected a building conforming to the existing two-to-four storey street context, while the developers wanted a building that would clearly signify as a tower. As described by Denton Corker Marshall,

“Since this building was “pioneering” in the sense that was the first commercial tower for many years in this precinct, the client did not see it as superficially “prestigious” (as in a Collins Street address). Consequently we were directed to a glass curtain wall as against a masonry type, as a means of minimising cost and speeding construction. Despite this, the client was adamant that he wanted a building of “architectural merit” provided that costs were not substantially more than standard commercial.

A relatively compact entry lobby to the tower is from Exhibition Street and is carved from the podium mass as a polished stone “theatrical” event. Again, client briefing was instrumental in the use of “rich materials” used to maximum effect in public areas.”

The tower relies on two construction aesthetics. The outer corners of frameless reflective glass curtain wall, and the subdivision of each face by 7.7 meter steel grillage extending the full height of the tower element. The terminates as a 12 meter high steel grillage which shrouds the top.

To achieve this layering, two relatively neutral high rise envelopes are combined to emulate a traditional tripartite arrangement. In this way, contemporary construction implies readable form through the illusion of scale reduction. This descaling device: elevating the extruded form of the tower above traditional street elevation (five storeys) and treating the tower as an abstract tectonic.

The vehicular and silhouette viewpoints involve sculptural issues of mass and profile which directly relate to the technologically scaled bulk of high-rise buildings as a global condition. In this case of the TAC House, the approximate outline of the building and the types of construction/cladding alternatives were either predetermined by the city planners or actual construction economics. Their design approach couples constructed images of commercial modernism in both its ‘low’ and ‘high’ styles as the basis of a mass modulating collage.

As a compositional method, the collaging of the reflective skin and fabricated frame has not been portrayed with the artistic tension of a dynamic cubist composition. Instead, the squat mass treated symmetrically and statically in order that an obvious sense of weight is compressed through the apparently lightweight, machine-manufactured materials.

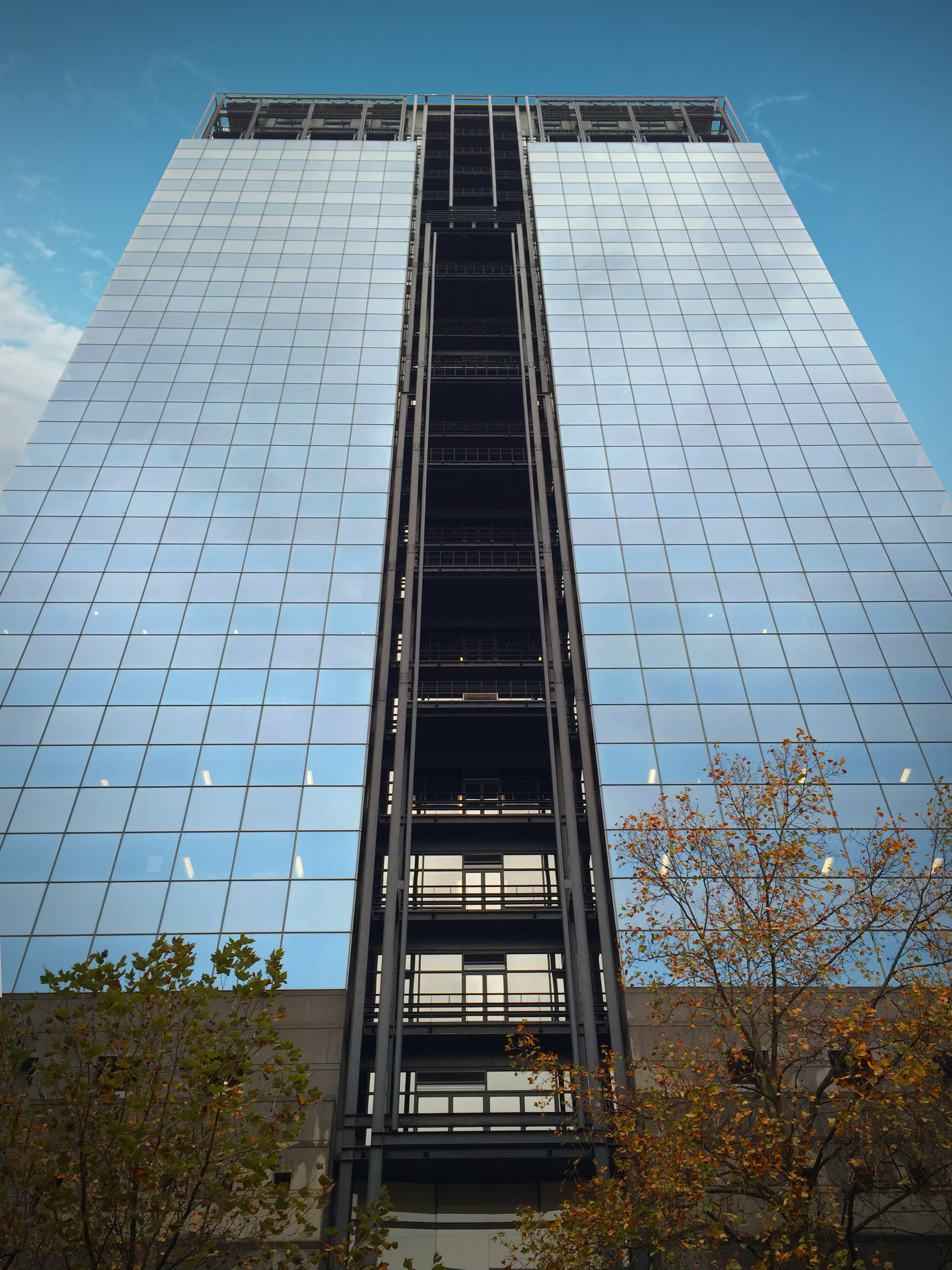
Exhibition Street Frontage of TAC House

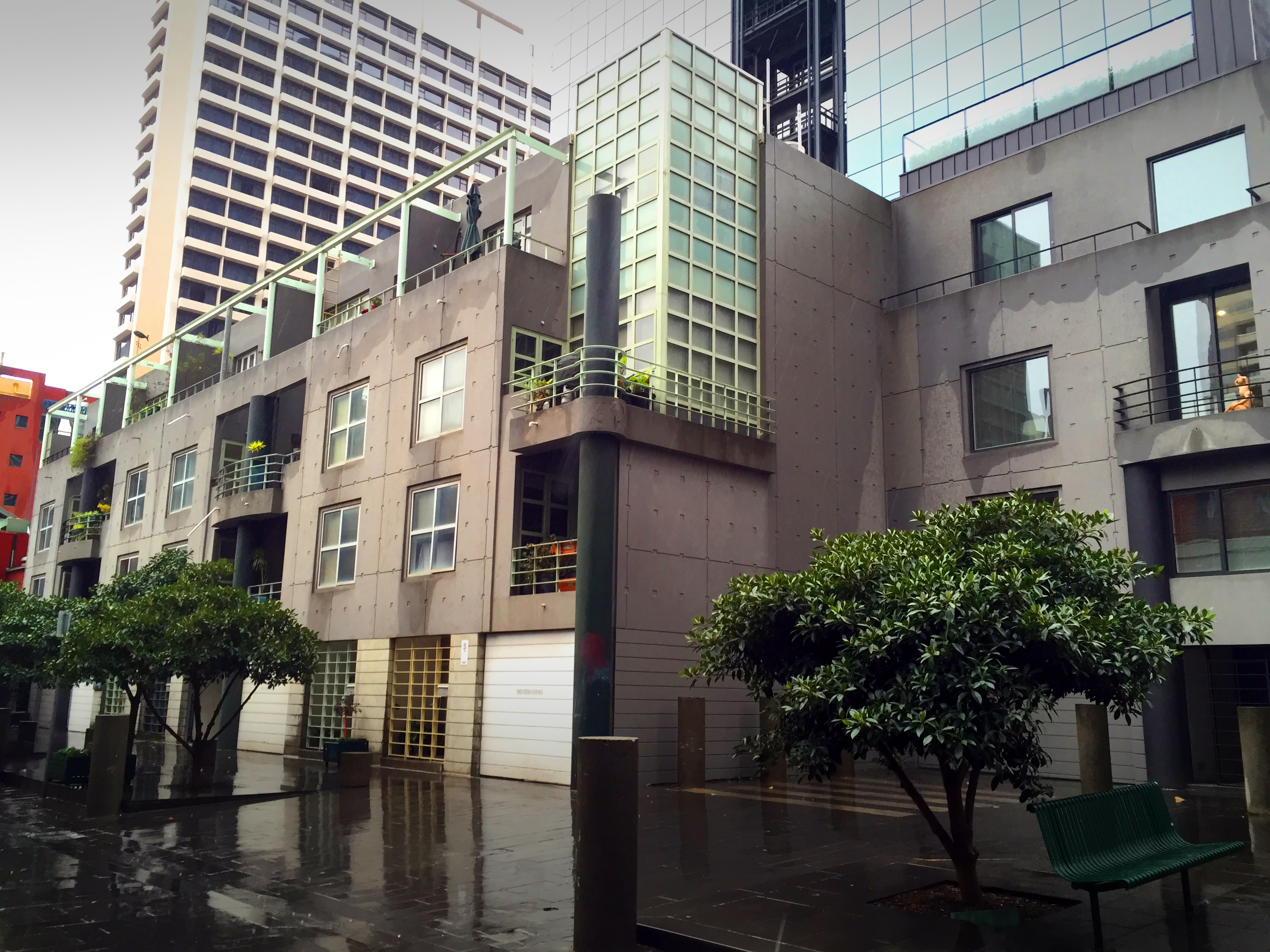
Townhouses located on Punch Lane (Behind the main office building)

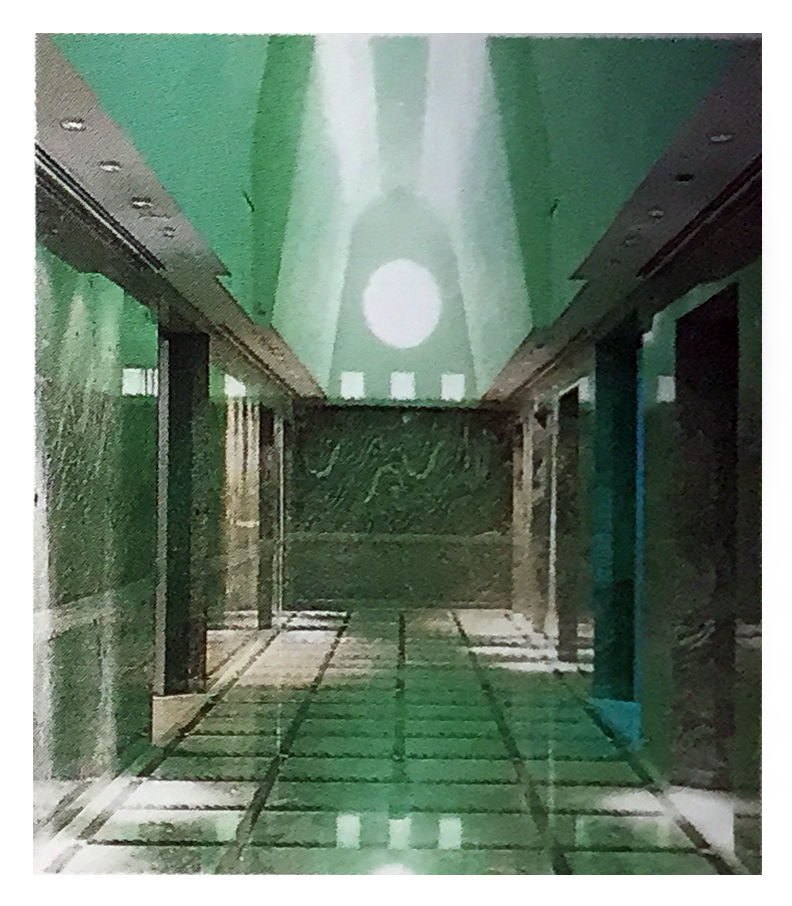
Lifts Lobby in 1989

TAC House Elevation

TAC House Ground Floor Plan

TAC House Level 11 Floor Plan

== Awards ==
RAIA Merit Award New Commercial, 1989
