= Adelphi Hotel, Melbourne =

Adephi Hotel
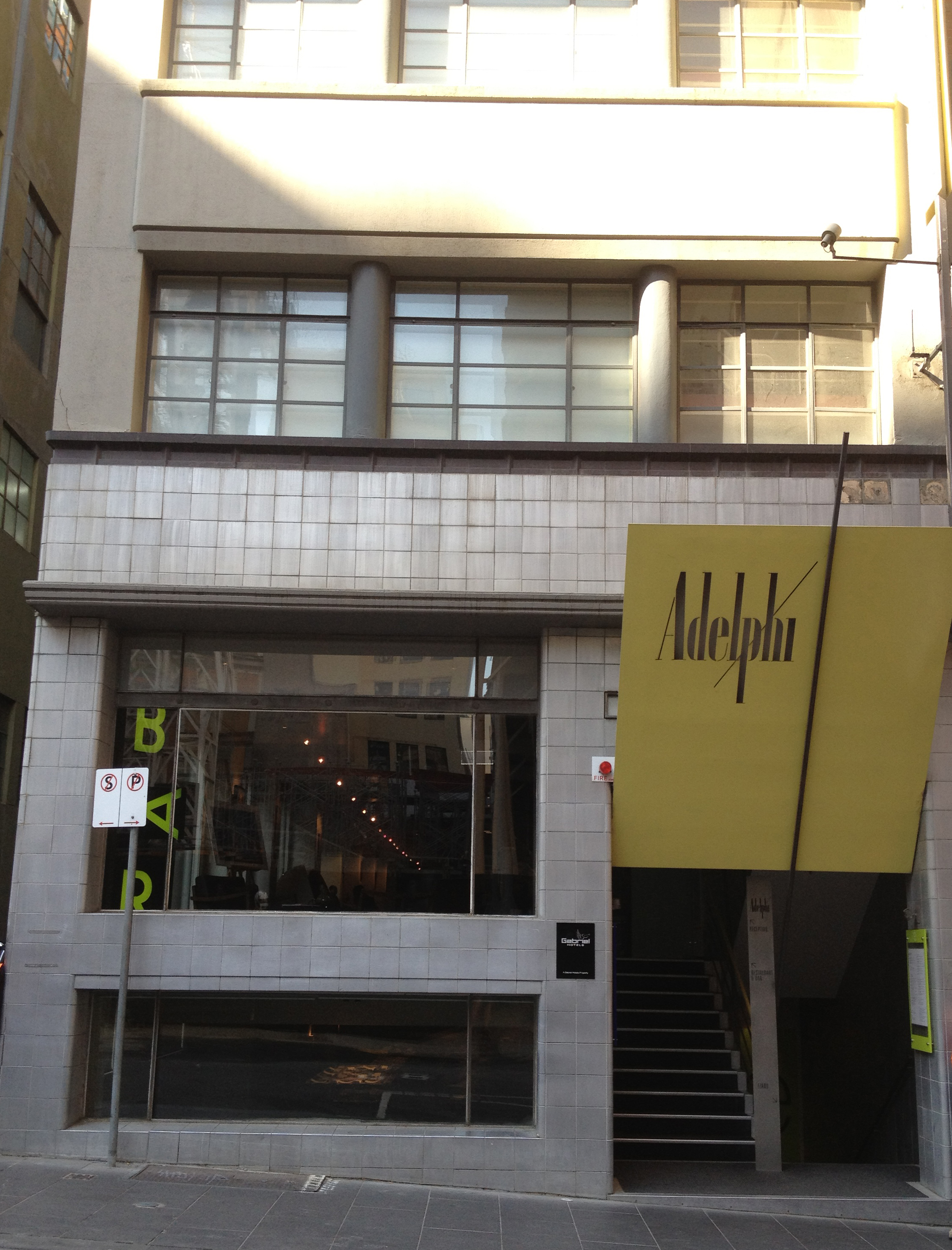

- Location within Melbourne

General information
- Status: Completed
- Type: Hotel
- Location: 187 Flinders Lane, Melbourne CBD, Victoria, Australia
- Coordinates: 37.8163°S 144.9683°E
- Opened: 1993
- Renovated: 1989

Design and construction
- Architect: Denton Corker Marshall

Website
- www.adelphi.com.au

The Adelphi Hotel is located in Melbourne, Australia. It began as a warehouse that was purchased and renovated by Denton Corker Marshall (DCM) architects in 1989, and officially opened for business in 1992

== History ==
The rag trade warehouse was built in 1938. It was purchased by Denton Corker Marshall architects in 1989, who converted the building into a boutique hotel.

Phase 1 of construction began on the basement in May 1989 and lasted until October 1990. Phase 2 construction started in January 1992. The hotel officially opened in November 1992.

In 2013, the Adelphi Hotel was bought by Dion Chandler, Ozzie Kheir and Simon Ongorato, who hired design studio Hachem to redesign the hotel's interior and image.

== Design ==
Situated on Flinders Lane, within a dense area of Melbourne's CBD, the original 1930s building was concrete-framed and free of columns, with beams spanning 3.8 meter centers from wall-to-wall piers. It was originally designed with the lane façade rendered in cement with openable steel-framed windows to provide lighting from the side. The façade was painted and rendered, with horizontal, full-width strip windows surrounded by projecting concrete heads and sills. The semi-basement level and ground floor were laid with ceramic tiles.

In 1989, DCM architects began refurbishing the building, retaining much of these original design elements and adding three new levels to the roof of the existing 8 floors. The Adelphi Hotel stands eleven stories high, and is 3.2 meters floor to floor, 8 meters wide, and 48 meters deep.

The half-basement of the hotel houses a bar and café. The ground floor, half a level up from the street, contains the hotel reception, lounge, bar and restaurant. The 34 hotel rooms are on levels 3 to 8, with levels 3 to 6 having six rooms per floor. These rooms range from 32 m^{2} (340 sq ft) to 37sqm and are connected via a single gallery corridor. The front two rooms are larger to allow interconnection to create a suite. Levels 7 and 8 have five rooms per floor and a rooftop bar and restaurant area known as the Club Bar in the top three levels.

Unlike conventional hotel swimming pools, DCM designed the pool in the form of a shipping container, cantilevering one meter over the front façade on Flinders Lane with a glass bottom.

=== Elements ===
DCM's intentions were to keep the original 1938 building intact. They implemented such elements as stainless steel, aluminum, translucent glass, timber veneered panels, and colored planar surfaces. Colored panels in blues, greens, yellows, oranges and reds were overlaid on the natural cement grey render tones.

All furniture and rugs were bespoke, designed specifically for the hotel by the architects themselves, who wanted everything within the hotel to be Australian-designed and made.

== Awards ==
- 1993 - RAIA National President's Award
- 1993 - Winner of Commercial Alterations & Extensions, RAIA Award (VIC)
- 1993 - RAIA (VIC) Award (Interiors)
