= South Project =

The South Project was a program of events originating in Melbourne designed to explore potential cultural connections between countries of the Global South.

== Origins ==
The idea for the South Project emerged in the aftermath of the 1999 Melbourne Visual Arts Biennial. While the biennial was designed to be an ongoing feature of Melbourne's visual arts calendar, lack of support from participating countries meant it was unable to continue. Consideration was given to the model of Brisbane's Asia-Pacific Triennial of Contemporary Art, which used a regional focus to gain profile. The concept of a southern focus emerged through a series of meetings held over 2001–2002 at the Australian Centre, University of Melbourne.

The Director of Craft Victoria, Kevin Murray, developed the South Project in 2003 with support of the Australia Council's Visual Arts Craft Strategy and Myer Foundation. The idea was first introduced with the "Between You and Me" symposium on 18 March 2003, which featured stories about Australian craft practitioners working with traditional communities in Ernabella, Tiwi Islands, East Timor and Gujarat. On 2 April 2003, the Myer Foundation hosted a meeting of the directors of Victorian visual arts organisations at Cranlana to discuss the possibility of a major international festival focusing on the South. By late 2003, project officers Hannah Matthews and Christobel Harvey were appointed. Magdalena Morena became general manager in 2004.

== Major elements ==
=== Melbourne Gathering 2004 ===
South 1: A New Conversation (1–4 July 2004, University of Melbourne) was a unique gathering of artists from more than 16 countries brought together to discuss what it means to live in the south. The opening keynote was given by Mbulelo Mzamane. There were 48 presentations designed to cover the breadth of southern cultural activity, including shared histories of struggle and displacement, current programs of cultural development and ideas for future collaborations across the latitude. These presentations were complemented by workshops, project clusters, performances, readings, walks and a welcoming bonfire hosted by members of the local Indigenous community.

To complement the event, at Craft Victoria the exhibition of Cross Pollination, curated by Anna Davern and Vicki Mason, displayed works by Australian and New Zealand jewellers inspired by botany.

=== Wellington Gathering 2005 ===
'Between Earth and Sky' in Wellington was hosted by Te Papa Museum 19–21 October 2005. It began with a traditional Pōwhiri followed by talks and workshops featuring Maori, Pakeha, Australian Aboriginal and foreign speakers. "With the theme 'between sky and earth' – ways of making a place in a placeless world- the content of the gathering included a heady mix of indigenous, environmental and socially oriented art production."

=== Santiago Gathering 2006 ===
The South American gathering 'Crossing Horizons' was held in Chile 1 – 4 October 2006 and hosted by the Centro Cultural Estacion Mapocho. It included talks at the Universidad de Chile, workshop at the Consejo Nacional de la Cultura in Valparaiso, residencies at Galeria Metropolitana and a performance by Domenico de Clario at the Pablo Neruda house La Sebastina. The two exhibitions were Trans Versa curated by Zara Stanhope and Danae Mossman, involving thirteen artists at three venues. And Make the Common Precious curated by Kevin Murray that make the link between 'poor craft' in Australia and the celebration of the ordinary in the poetry of Pablo Neruda.

=== Johannesburg Gathering 2007 ===
The African gathering was held in Johannesburg 18–21 October 2007 at the Hector Pieterson Museum in Soweto. It was opened by William Kentridge. A Festival of the South was presented by the Mbuisa Makhubu Primary School (previously Belle Primary) in Orlando West, featuring results of residencies by Australian artists Sara Thorn, Maree Clarke and Emma Davies. There were also workshops at the Crafts Council of South Africa and African Theatre.

=== Common Goods: Cultures Meet through Craft ===
Common Goods was an exhibition for the 2006 Commonwealth Games at the Melbourne Museum involving residencies in host institutions around Victoria. Artisans were invited from Commonwealth countries, including Ahmed Nimad (Maldives) Audrey Boyle (New Zealand), Lewis Dick (Mauritius), Hlengiwe Dube (South Africa), Mary Farrugia (Malta), Niki Hastings-McFall (New Zealand), Zakir Hussain (India), Te Atiwei Ririnui (New Zealand), Margarita Sampson (Norfolk Island), Chandraguptha Thenuwara (Sri Lanka) and Julie Tipene-O'Toole (New Zealand). Each was partnered with a local host artists including Kerri Ann Abbott, Jennifer Bartholomew, Lorraine Connelly-Northey, Lucy Irvine, Wendy Lugg, Mark McDean and David Ray. Their collaborations were then exhibited at Melbourne Museum. According to Wulan Dirgantoro, "As many of these artists are no longer entirely dependent on traditional materials to produce their objects, this exhibition presents a challenge for viewers to see the complexity and breadth of 'world craft' outside the notion of exoticism and 'fourth world' façade."

=== South Artists in Residence ===
Institutions in Australia, Brazil, Fiji New Zealand and South Africa hosted artists as part of a residency program designed to facilitate exchange. The artists who participated include:

- Vicky Shukuroglou, Australia
- David Bosun, Australia
- Alwin Reamillo, Australia
- Jumaadi, Australia
- Salote Tawale, Australia
- Guillermina Antunez, Chile
- Juan Castillo, Chile
- Leonardo Ortega, Chile
- Claudia del Fierro, Chile
- Laura Vinci, Brazil
- Elida Tessler, Brazil
- Cristina Abad Angel, Colombia
- Michael Mbata, South Africa
- Jeremy Wafer, South Africa
- Clifford Charles, South Africa
- Heri Dono, Indonesia
- Jooyoung Lee, Korea
- Mata Smith, New Zealand
- Gregor Kregar, New Zealand
- Marie Strauss, New Zealand

=== South Kids ===
The South Project included a number of schools that hosted a specially made kit that explored connections across the south. This included the story of Susu, an emu that wanted to fly like an eagle. This story was designed as an allegory of the way people of the South often wish they lived in the North. Children were encouraged to come up with solutions for the emu, as well as provide information about the flightless birds in their own country.

Participating schools included:

- Pembroke Primary School, Victoria
- Collingwood College, Victoria
- Abbotsford Primary School, Victoria
- Carlton Primary School, Victoria
- Taupo Primary School, New Zealand
- Achao Primary School, Chiloe, Chile
- Sculpture Academy, Port Luis, Mauritius
- Mbuisa Makhubu Primary School in Soweto

== Legacy ==
The South Project continued as a Craft Victoria project until December 2007, when it became an independent association under Director Magdalena Moreno. As an independent organisation, South Project hosted further gatherings in Melbourne and Yogyakarta. It closed down in 2013.

The following are initiatives emerging out of the South Project:

- Southern Perspectives is a network of writers involved in dialogue about thinking that is particular to the South
- Joyaviva: Live Jewellery Across the Pacific is a project to explore jewellery as art across the South by considering the modern amulet
- Sangam: Australia India Design Platform is a three-year initiative to promote creative partnerships between artisans and designers

== Bibliography ==
- "The South Issue: New Horizons.” Artlink 27 (2). http://www.artlink.com.au/issues/2720/the-south-issue-new-horizons/.
- Gardner, Anthony, and Charles Green. 2013. “Biennials of the South on the Edges of the Global.” Third Text 27 (4): 442–455.
- Gardner, Anthony, ed. 2013. Mapping South: Journeys in South-South Cultural Relations. Melbourne: South Project.
- Murray, Kevin. 2008. “Keys to the South.” Australian Humanities Review 44. http://www.australianhumanitiesreview.org/archive/Issue-March-2008/murray.html.
- Murray, Kevin. 2006. “The South Project: A Conference of (Flightless) Birds.” Australian and New Zealand Journal of Art 6/7 (2/1): 6.
- Murray, Kevin (17 June 2008). "Let's look both south and north to find our place". The Age.
- Zeplin, Pam. 2011. “Heading South: A Meditation on the ‘ruins’ of the South Project' Southern Perspectiveshttp://www.southernperspectives.net/region/pacific/heading-south-a-meditation-on-the-ruins-of-the-south-project
- "South 1:1-4 July 2004". South Project.org. Retrieved 11 December 2023. https://web.archive.org/web/20080219121426/http://www.southproject.org/south1/index.htm
