= Marks & Clerk =

Intellectual property firm

- Headquarters: London
- No. of offices: 15
- Major practice areas: Intellectual Property
- Date founded: 1887 (Birmingham)
- Company type: Partnership
- Website: www.marks-clerk.com

Marks & Clerk is an international group of intellectual property service providers, encompassing patent attorneys, trade mark attorneys, lawyers and consultants. Including partners, it currently employs over 300 legal practitioners worldwide and over 550 other staff. It primarily offers intellectual property (IP) protection, strategy, dispute resolution and commercial and valuation services to clients around the world.

== Offices ==
The business has a total of 15 offices worldwide. It operates out of eight offices in the UK, two in Canada and others in Luxembourg, China, Hong Kong, Singapore and Malaysia.

- UK – 1887
- Canada – 1921
- Hong Kong – 1973
- Luxembourg – 1989
- Singapore – 1995
- China – 1997
- Anthony Evans & Co. (Hong Kong) – 2008
- Malaysia – 2009

The firm merged with the Lloyd Wise Group in 2007, extending its client base into the Asia-Pacific region. In 2009 its UK Patent and Trade Mark Attorney business became a Limited liability partnership. It celebrated its 130th anniversary in 2017.
