= Africa–South America Summit =

Tri-annual bi-continental diplomatic conference

The Africa-South America Summit (ASA Summit) is a tri-annual bi-continental diplomatic conference between the leading politicians of countries in South America and Africa. It was first held in 2006 in Abuja, Nigeria, followed by iterations in 2009 on Isla Margarita, Venezuela and in 2013 in Malabo, Equatorial Guinea.

== List of summits ==
=== First ASA Summit ===
The first summit was held in Abuja and spearheaded by Luiz Inácio Lula da Silva. It promulgated the Abuja Declaration and Plan of Action, as well as the resolution creating the "South America - Africa Cooperation Forum" (ASACOF).

=== Third ASA Summit ===
The third ASA summit was scheduled to be held in Libya in 2011, but due to the civil war which broke out that year, was postponed to 2012 and again to 2013, when it was finally held in Malabo. Chavez was a notable exception, being represented by Venezuelan foreign minister Elias Jaua due to Chavez's cancer treatment.

=== Fourth ASA Summit ===
The fourth summit was scheduled to be held in Ecuador in 2016.

== See also ==
- South Atlantic Peace and Cooperation Zone
