= Norman MacKenzie (academic) =

Canadian senator and university president (1894–1986)

The Honourable Norman Archibald Macrae MacKenzie CC CMG MM CD QC FRSC
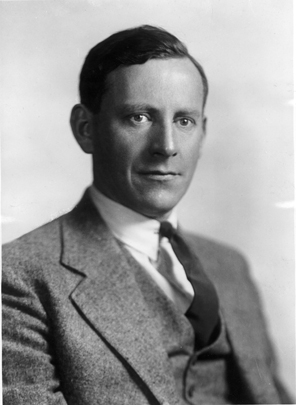

3rd President of the University of British Columbia
- In office 1944–1962
- Preceded by: Leonard Klinck
- Succeeded by: John B. Macdonald

Canadian Senator from British Columbia
- In office February 24, 1966 – January 5, 1969
- Appointed by: Lester B. Pearson

7th President of the University of New Brunswick
- In office 1940–1944

Personal details
- Born: January 5, 1894 Pugwash, Nova Scotia, Canada
- Died: January 26, 1986 (aged 92)
- Party: Independent Liberal
- Spouse: Margaret Thomas
- Children: 3
- Occupation: Lawyer; politician

Norman Archibald Macrae (N.A.M.) MacKenzie, CC CMG MM CD QC FRSC (January 5, 1894 – January 26, 1986) was President of the University of New Brunswick from 1940 to 1944, President of the University of British Columbia from 1944 to 1962, and a Senator from 1966 to 1969.

== Background ==
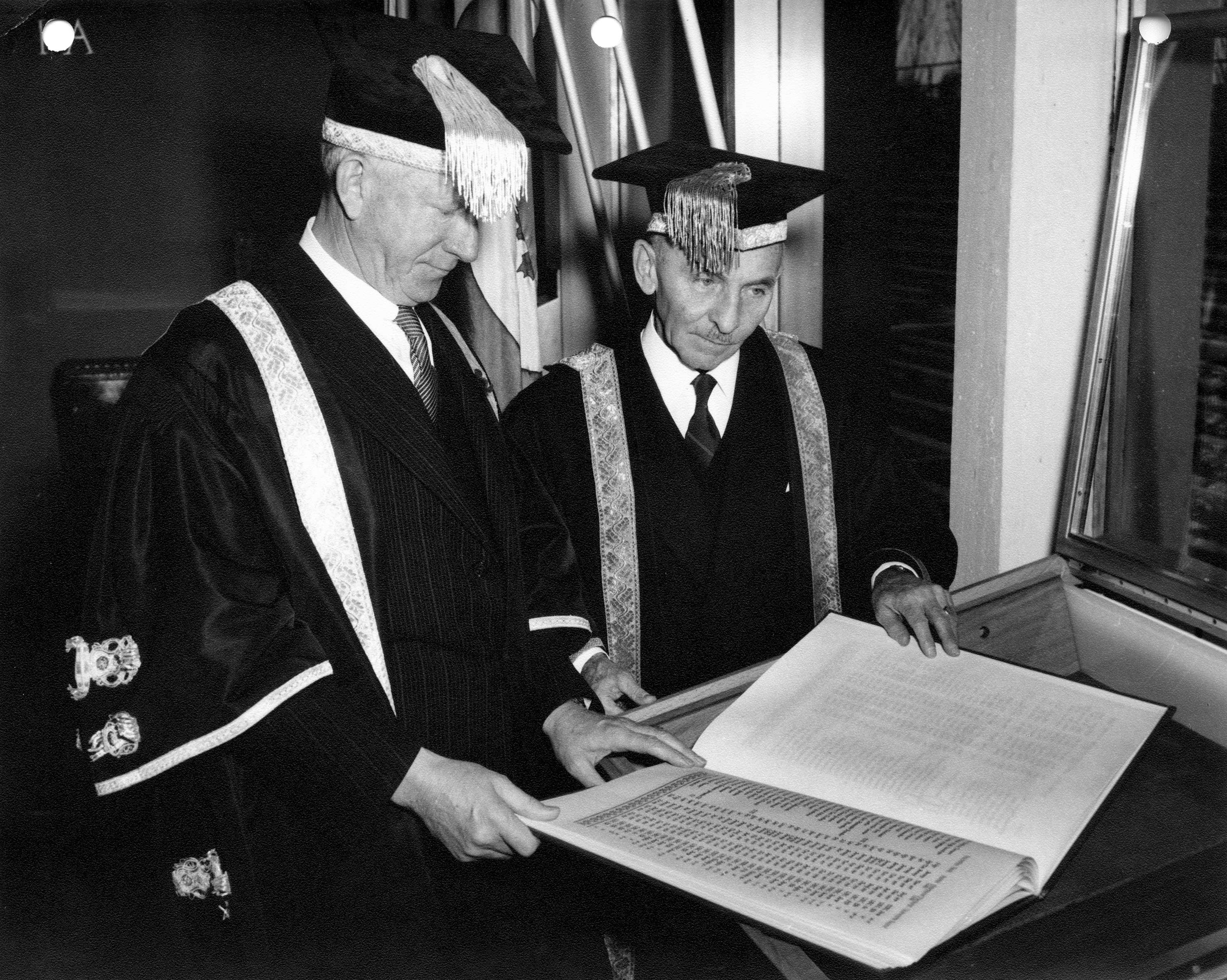
photograph of Norman MacKenzie (University of British Columbia President) and Sherwood Lett (U.B.C. Chancellor) viewing the Roll of Service in the War Memorial Gymnasium during Remembrance Day ceremonies. In 1955

He was born in Pugwash, Nova Scotia. He fought during World War I. He studied law at Dalhousie, Harvard and Cambridge Universities. In 1927, he went to the University of Toronto, where he taught law for thirteen years. He became president of the University of New Brunswick in 1940. He was president of the University of British Columbia from 1944 to 1962. In 1959 he hosted Queen Elizabeth at the University of British Columbia's Faculty Club.

After his retirement from UBC he was appointed as a member of the Senate from 1966 to 1969 representing the senatorial division of University-Point Grey, British Columbia. He sat as an Independent Liberal Senator.

In 1969, he was made a Companion of the Order of Canada.

He was a founder of the Canadian Institute of International Affairs in 1928. Now known as the Canadian International Council.

He was one of the five members of The Royal Commission on National Development in the Arts, Letters and Sciences chaired by Vincent Massey that held hearings across Canada from 1949–51, otherwise known as the Massey Commission.

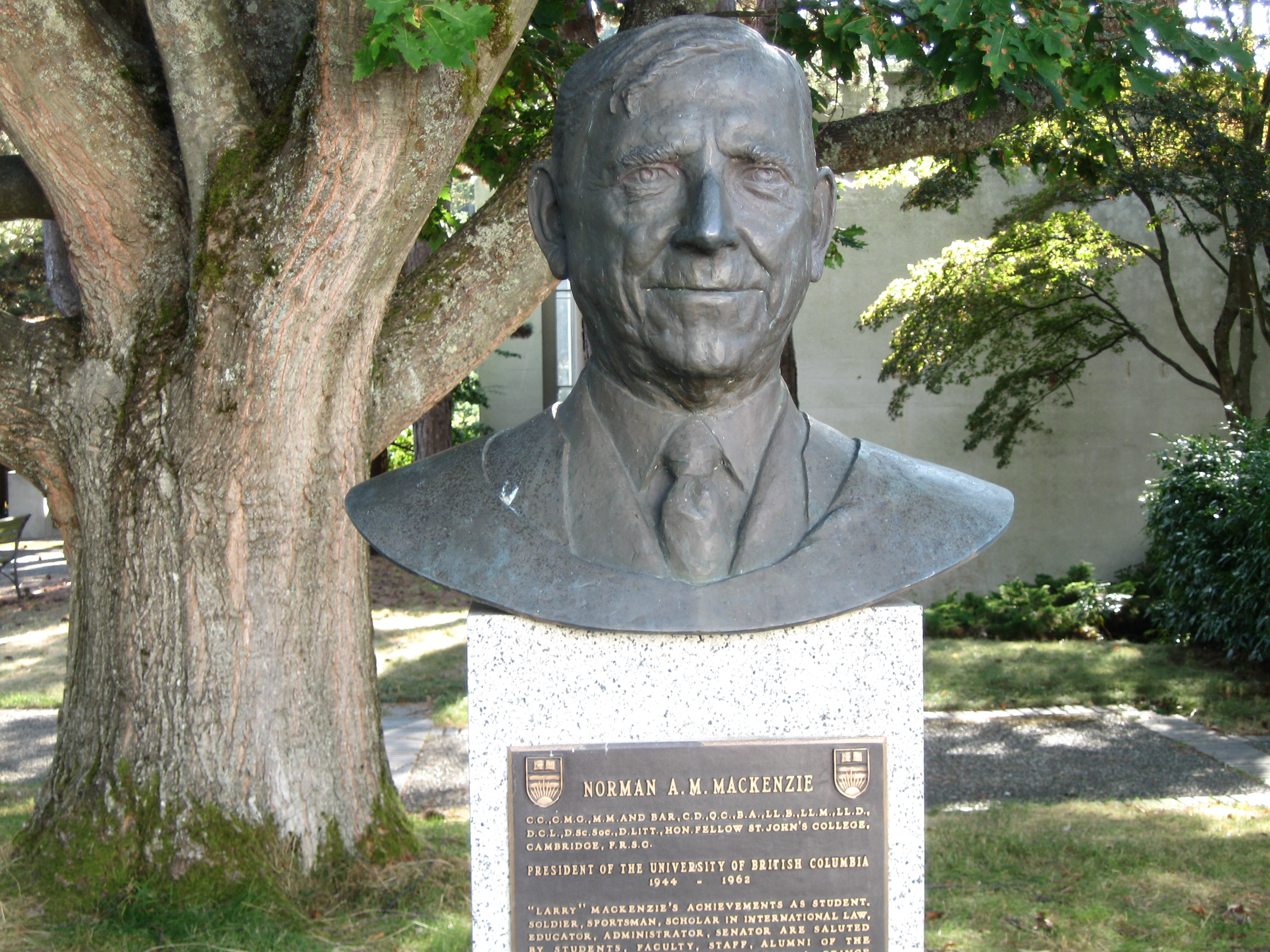
Sculpture on the University of British Columbia campus

He was an original member of the Canada Council (The Canadian Council for the Arts). Its founding by the government was a recommendation of the Massey Commission.

Amongst many other initiatives at UBC, he founded the UBC Department of Asian Studies when he brought William L. Holland after the dissolution of the Institute for Pacific Relations (IPR) to UBC in 1961 together with the former IPR journal Pacific Affairs which UBC continues to publish.

He and his wife, born Margaret Thomas (1903–1987), had three children: Bridget Mackenzie (?-present), Susan Mackenzie (1928– 2011), and Patrick Thomas Mackenzie (1932-January 23, 2006).
