= Michael Greenberg (economist) =

Chinese economics and history scholar

Michael Greenberg (28 November 1914 – 19 April 1992) was a scholar of Chinese economics and history. He was alleged in the first wave of McCarthyism to have provided a Soviet spy with information during the 1940s, but was never charged with espionage.

Greenberg was born Michael Menahem Greenberg in Manchester, Lancashire, England, son of a Polish-born father and a mother from Iași, Romania, both of whom had arrived in the UK as children in the 1890s. He attended Manchester Grammar School and won a scholarship to study history at Trinity College, Cambridge, where he graduated with first-class honours.

Greenberg arrived in the United States in 1939 to attend the graduate school of Harvard University under a Joseph Hodges Choate Memorial Fellowship from Trinity College. He studied at Harvard from October 1939 to January 1941. Greenberg also became managing editor of the Institute of Pacific Relations (IPR) publication, Pacific Affairs in 1941. In August 1941, Edward Clark Carter, general secretary to the Pacific Council of the IPR, wrote Lauchlin Currie asking if letters to Owen Lattimore in China could be transmitted so that "they are not read by others before reaching him." Currie promptly replied on a White House letterhead that "I will be glad to get the letters you mentioned to Lattimore uncensored." Currie's assistant in the White House was Greenberg.

In 1942 Greenberg became a China specialist at the Board of Economic Warfare and an assistant to the agency's head, Lauchlin Currie. Greenberg later worked as a foreign affairs economist in the Administrative Division, Enemy Branch, of the Foreign Economic Administration. Elizabeth Bentley, who had never met Greenberg (see Silvermaster file 2C page 18) stated that for a brief period Greenberg supplied information concerning principally China. Unspecified information was alleged to have been passed through Mary Price.

Civil Service Commission security officials wanted Greenberg dismissed upon learning of an alleged involvement with the Communist Party (see Silvermaster file 2C page 18). Louis Budenz and an academic Karl Wittfogel who met Greenberg in Cambridge and stated that he "must have" been a Communist because of his associates. Upon appeal, the Civil Service Commission was over-ruled. Greenberg became a U.S. citizen in 1944 and transferred to the Department of State in 1945, resigning in 1946. Greenberg left the United States permanently in 1947 after being interviewed by the FBI so was never called before a Congressional Committee.

Greenberg's FBI file is highly redacted. A wiretap in 1945 revealed Greenberg's co-workers discussing "the charges against him", and remarking that Greenberg would have been better off if he had worked, but that he had never turned out a piece of work in the three years he had been employed by the government. His FBI file concluded: "Investigations conducted thus far has failed to disclose any pertinent information to this case at this time." (Silvermaster file 2C page 50)

Upon return to England, Greenberg went back to Cambridge and completed work on his Ph.D. thesis, which was eventually published as a book British Trade and the Opening of China (ISBN 0-85345-497-3, 1947), Cambridge University Press, reissued in 1970, republished in the US in 1979, and again in 2000 as part of an eight volume set (China Trade: British Commerce and the Opening of China, 1635–1842). This book, based on the then recently released archives of the Jardine Matheson Company, a major player in the development of Hong Kong, describes the forceful exploitation of China by British colonial power in establishing and maintaining the colony of Hong Kong (see also Opium War).

Blocked from academic promotion, most likely due to his left-leaning politics, he went on to work in a number of jobs in journalism, public relations, advertising and film criticism in England, Switzerland and France. He lost his U.S. citizenship due to absence from the US and was denied a passport by the British Home Office, even as late as the 1970s. His British passport was never restored to him, and the accusations continued to hound him throughout the 1950s.

In 1958, he was recruited as economic advisor to the Central Bank of Ceylon, returning to the UK in 1960. Shortly thereafter, he became, as Michael Green, assistant editor and then chief editor of The Banker, a monthly professional journal published by the Financial Times of London. He later became chief economist at the London stockbroking company De Zoete & Bevan. He commented that in the City of London most people shared the Marxist analysis of capitalism that he had learned in Cambridge in the 1930s, but that they were, by contrast, quite content with the implicit inequalities.

His obituary appeared in The Times and The Independent. He is survived by his wife and three sons.

== Sources ==
- FBI Silvermaster File
- FBI Silvermaster file
- Michael Greenberg interview, 7 June 1947, FBI Silvermaster file, serial 2583.
- Washington Times-Herald, April 15, 1951, p. 5.
- Elizabeth Bentley's Testimony in Institute of Pacific Relations, Hearings, Part 2, Exhibit No. 111, 112, pp. 433–434.
- Elizabeth Bentley deposition 30 November 1945, FBI file 65-14603.
- Earl Latham, The Communist Controversy in Washington: From the New Deal to McCarthy, Cambridge: Harvard University Press, (1966), 306–307.
- John Costello, Mask of Treachery, New York: Morrow, (1988), 380–381, 480–481.
- John Earl Haynes and Harvey Klehr, Venona: Decoding Soviet Espionage in America (New Haven: Yale University Press, 1999), pgs. 111, 113, 114, 161, 374, 408, 409, 415, 421.
- Boughton, James M. and Sandilands, Roger J. "Politics and the Attack on FDR's Economists: From Grand Alliance to the Cold War", Intelligence and National Security, Spring 2002
- Michael Greenberg FBI FOIA
