= Mark Gayn =

American-Canadian journalist

- Gayn in 1978
- Born: Mark Julius Ginsbourg; April 21, 1909 (age 117); Barim, Manchuria, Qing Empire
- Died: December 17, 1981 (aged 72)
- Education: Pomona College, Columbia University Graduate School of Journalism
- Occupation: journalist
- Years active: 1930s–1981
- Employer: The Toronto Star
- Known for: work appeared in The Washington Post, The New York Times, Newsweek, Time magazine
- Notable work: see Works
- Spouse: Suzanne Lengvary

Notes
- He moved to Canada after the State Department refused to admit his Hungarian-born wife to the United States.

Mark Gayn, born Mark Julius Ginsbourg (21 April 1909 – 17 December 1981) was an American and Canadian journalist, who worked for The Toronto Star for 30 years.

== Background ==
Mark Julius Ginsbourg was born in 1909 in Barim, Manchuria, in the Qing Empire (today Balin [巴林鎮], Yakeshi in Inner Mongolia, China) to Russian-Jewish parents who had migrated from the Russian Empire. He went to school in Vladivostok in the Soviet Union and then in Shanghai, China. He was accepted to Pomona College in Claremont, California, in the United States where he majored in political science. Following his graduation from Pomona, he entered the Columbia University Graduate School of Journalism, graduating in 1934.

== Career ==
Ginsbourg got into his career in the 1930s as a stringer for The Washington Post in the Shanghai. He returned to the U.S. shortly after World War II broke out in Europe, changing his name to Gayn to prevent Japanese reprisals against his brother Sam, who remained in Japanese-occupied Shanghai. Gayn also went on to write for Collier's and was arrested in the FBI raid on the offices of the Institute for Pacific Relations' Amerasia office in June 1945, on charges of illegally procuring and publishing secret government information. At the time of his arrest, he was reporting not only for Colliers but also the Chicago Sun as well as TIME Magazine.

However, the charges were dropped shortly thereafter—The New York Times described him as "quickly vindicated in the courts." The State Department refused to admit his Hungarian-born wife Suzanne Lengvary to the United States, on the grounds of her alleged Communist sympathies, so he moved to Canada and continued his work as a foreign affairs correspondent.

He filed reports on North Korean dictator Kim Il Sung's repression and, as one of the first Western journalists admitted into China in the mid-1960s, he managed to criticize the country's Maoist regimentation.

Within the U.S., Gayn's work appeared within The New York Times as well as in Newsweek and in Time magazine.

== Death ==
At the time of his death from cancer on 17 December 1981, Gayn was still the senior foreign affairs correspondent for the Toronto Star in Toronto, Ontario, Canada.

== Legacy ==
The Mark Gayn Papers—covering his 50 years as a journalist—were given to the Thomas Fisher Rare Book Library at the University of Toronto before his death in 1981. (Note: There is a typescript guide to the contents: Collection Guide to the Mark Gayn Papers (MS Col. 215), prepared by Graham S. Bradshaw. An exhibition and catalogue with material from this collection were created in 2016, Reading Revolution: Art and Literacy during China's Cultural Revolution, by Jennifer Purtle and Elizabeth Rodolfo, with contribution by Stephen Qiao)

== Works ==
During his life, Mark Gayn wrote four books:

- The Fight for the Pacific. W. Morrow and Company. 1942.
- Journey From the East: An Autobiography. Alfred A. Knopf. 1944.
- Japan Diary. Tuttle Publishing. 1948.
- New Japan Diary. Tuttle Publishing. December 1981. ISBN 9780804813693.
