= Mont Tremblant Conference =

World War II conference

Mont Tremblant Conference: Eighth International Conference of the Institute of Pacific Relations
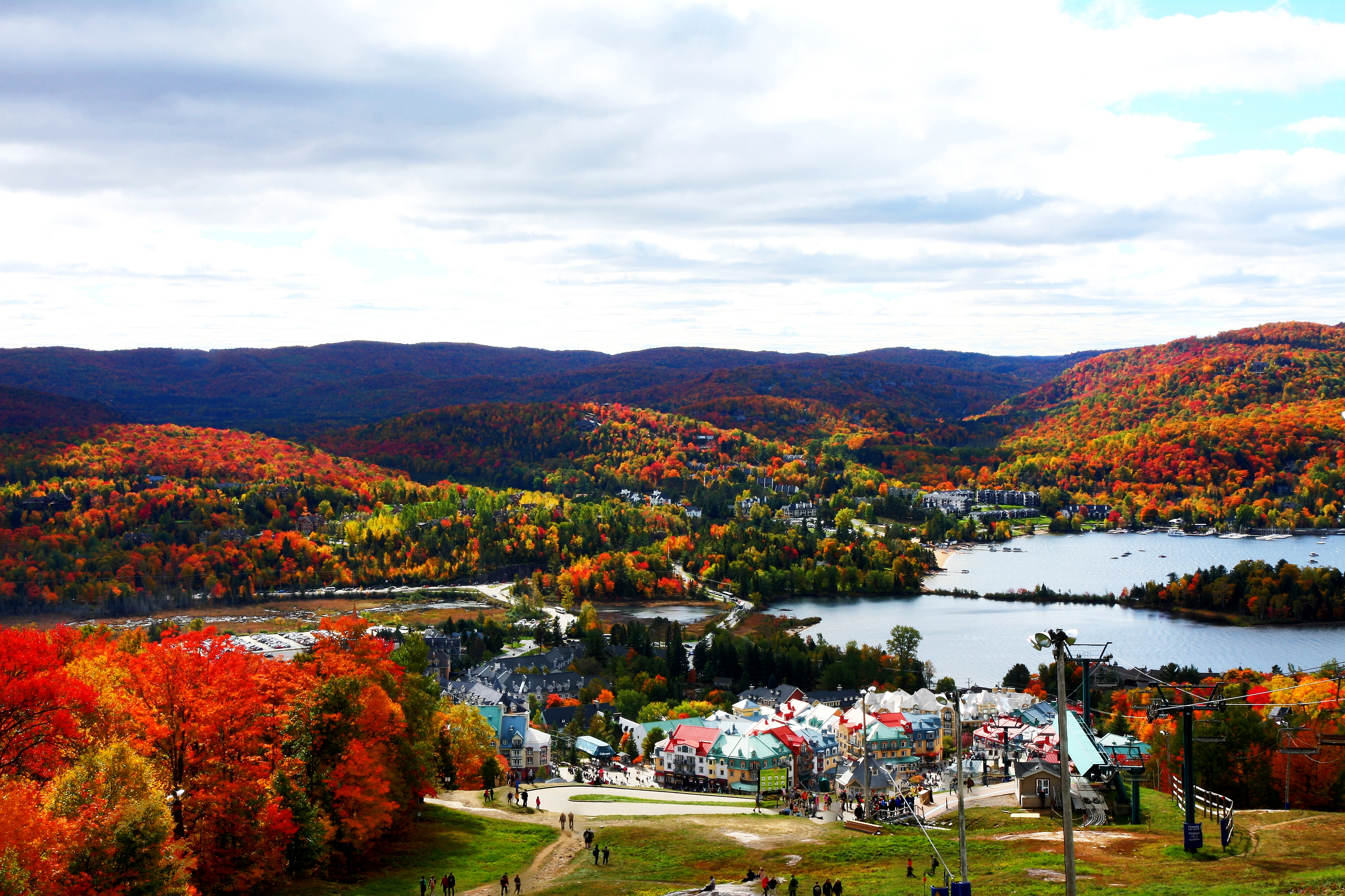
- The conference was held at Mont-Tremblant, Quebec
- Host country: Canada
- Date: December 4–14, 1942
- Cities: Mont Tremblant
- Venues: Mount Tremblant Lodge
- Participants: Australia; Canada; China; Dutch East Indies; Free France; India; Korea (government in exile); Netherlands; New Zealand; Philippines; Thailand; United Kingdom; United States
- Chair: Alfred Sao-ke Sze
- Precedes: Hot Springs, Virginia conference, 1945

The Mont Tremblant Conference, or the Eighth International Conference of the Institute of Pacific Relations, was a conference held at Mont-Tremblant in Quebec, Canada, in December 1942, organized by the Institute of Pacific Relations. Unofficial delegates from 12 countries met to discuss the waging of World War II in the Pacific theatre, and the structure of international affairs after the war, with a particular focus on the welfare of countries in East Asia and Southeast Asia.

The conference was held shortly after the signing of the Atlantic Charter and nearly a year after the initial creation of the United Nations, so delegates to the conference debated their competing interpretations of the Charter, and discussed what the war in the Pacific portended for the postwar order. The main dispute in the conference was the American delegation's critiques of British colonial policy, and the British delegation's concerns that America might return to isolationism after the war, which they worried could threaten world stability if Britain also pursued decolonization.

Historians have tended to view the conference as a reflection, more than a cause, of wartime and postwar international policy. Historical analyses of the conference have focused on its role as an early forum for conversation about decolonization, which was made possible by its timing, its focus on the Pacific, and its inclusion of delegates from a number of countries that had not been included in other major wartime conferences. Substantial time at the conference was devoted to the interests of India and Korea, which was a departure from the focus on Europe that had characterized most previous discussions about the postwar order.

== Setting and composition ==
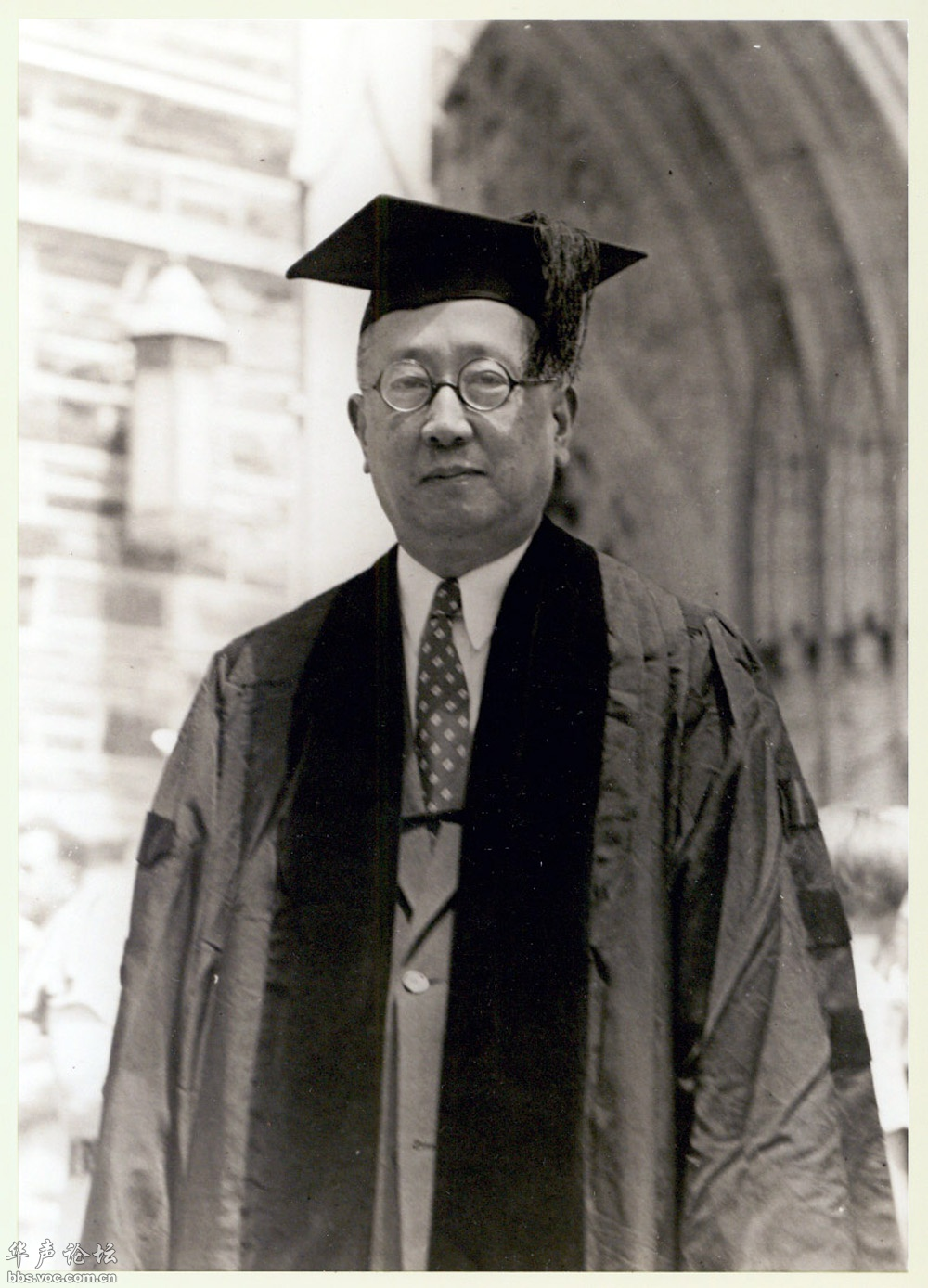
The diplomat Alfred Sao-ke Sze chaired the conference.

The conference began on December 4 and ended on December 14, 1942. It was convened by the Institute of Pacific Relations, the eighth such unofficial war conference organized by that body, to discuss the prosecution of World War II in the Pacific theatre as well as the structure of international cooperation after the end of the war.

The conference was chaired by Alfred Sao-ke Sze, who had been the Chinese ambassador to the countries that supplied the two largest delegations to the conference, the United States and the United Kingdom. In nearly contemporaneous accounts the number of delegates ranged from 100 to 150, but the historian Jung-hyoo Ko has placed the total at 131 delegates from 12 countries: Australia, the British Raj, Canada, China, Free France, Korea, the Netherlands and the (occupied) Dutch East Indies, New Zealand, the Commonwealth of the Philippines (in exile in Washington), Thailand, the United Kingdom, and the United States.

The delegates were attending as private citizens and not as official representatives of their governments, and members of the press were not invited to cover the event, so accounts after the fact described the conversations as being unusually candid. The attendees included members of government and prominent diplomats, including the sitting United States Senator Elbert D. Thomas and diplomat Stanley Hornbeck, with the British delegation led by the colonial administrator Malcolm Hailey, 1st Baron Hailey. The political writer Frederick Vanderbilt Field wrote shortly after the conference that "many of the leading figures at the conference represented very conservative political thought", though this was less true of those delegates who represented British Dominions, whom Field identified as "conspicuously more progressive".

The conference was notable for the diversity of its delegates. This was the first time that such a conference had been attended by an Indian delegation or a Thai delegation. The inclusion of a Korean observer, Younghill Kang, was also noteworthy, particularly since the conference would discuss the future of the Korean Peninsula. However, the lack of any representative from the Soviet Union also drew attention.

== Topics ==
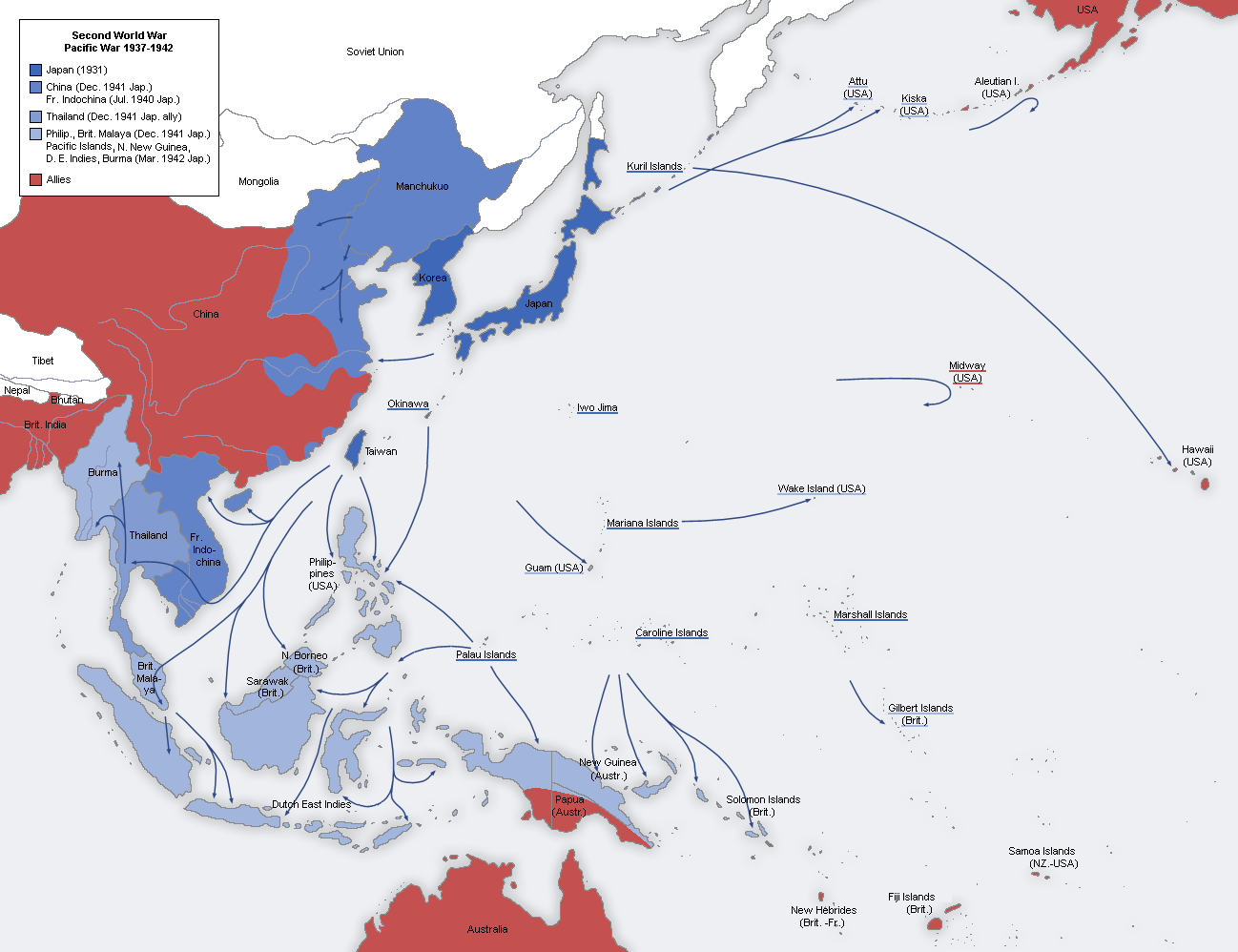
By the end of 1942, when the conference took place, Japan had invaded numerous countries throughout the Pacific.

The goal of the conference was to address how the United Nations could help to prosecute the war in the Pacific theatre, with a focus on improving "racial, political and economic justice and welfare" both during and after the war.

Frederick Field analyzed the central point of contention in the conference as a split between, on the one hand, the American and British Dominion delegates, and on the other, the delegates from Britain, the Netherlands, and the Dutch holdings. Specifically, the American delegates viewed the war as a people's war that was being waged to advance the cause of liberation, so that a natural continuation of the war would be an end to imperialism, including British imperialism. This argument was put in stark terms; for example, the historian and American government advisor on East Asia policy Tyler Dennett wrote in a statement to the conference that the American people supported the liquidation of the prewar colonial order. In contrast, the British delegates were concerned with American participation in a post-war world order, and sought assurances that America would not simply withdraw into isolationism after the war. In advancing these aims, both sides argued that the other side was not being consistent with the recent Atlantic Charter. Field interpreted the whole conference as hinging on the interpretation of the Atlantic Charter: did the Charter's defense of self-governance and sovereign rights apply narrowly to the states that had been invaded by Nazi Germany, or were they applicable to all peoples, including those under British dominion? This also raised the question of what would replace the British Empire, and what the British delegates perceived as its stabilizing influence on the world; they argued that the only sufficient force would be vigorous American participation in international affairs.

In a report issued shortly after the conference, the Royal Institute for International Affairs remarked that the conference included many harsh critiques of the British Empire, which it viewed as largely unfounded. Much later, Suke Wolton described the conference as a moment when British delegates were placed on the defensive about British imperialism; in a book chapter called "Defending the Empire", Wolton describes how Malcolm Hailey defended the idea that British imperialism was a force for social progress and improved the welfare of colonized peoples. Wolton points out that the conference took place in a difficult period for the Colonial Office, when Allied rhetoric during World War II against tyranny and in defense of democracy seemed to also threaten the justifications for colonialism, and ambiguous language in the Atlantic Charter appeared to have promised independence to colonized peoples, although British authorities denied that. However, questions were quickly raised at the conference about American commitment to the ideals of the Atlantic Charter: this was done by bringing up their own record of imperialism (for example, the conference included delegates from the Philippines, which had been an American colony prior to its recent invasion by Japan), by arguing that their isolationism and slow entry into the war while much of Europe and East Asia were conquered seemed to undermine the credibility of their commitment to ensuring sovereignty rights, and was also underscored with hints about the prevalence of racism in the United States.

The inclusion of delegates from East Asia and Southeast Asia, including China, Thailand, and Korea, as well as the focus on Pacific policy, heavily influenced the discussions at the conference. Delegates from China voiced concern that China was being excluded from military decision-making even within its own theatre of war, and were concerned that this exclusion would be continued in the postwar world order. They urged the creation of an executive body within the new United Nations, with responsibilities for example in the enforcement of disarmament agreements, which would ensure that large countries could not be sidelined in postwar decision-making. The inclusion for the first time of Indian delegates similarly had the effect of bringing their interests to the negotiations. Field wrote that problems faced by India "arose again and again in connection with every aspect of Pacific policy." The Indian delegation successfully argued that India, if established as an independent state, would need substantial economic assistance to transform its largely agricultural economy into an industrial one, and that it would benefit from military cooperation like naval security guarantees.

== Conclusions ==
A 1942 map showing the extent of British imperial holdings in 1942.

The conference delegates ultimately agreed on a memorandum that not only advocated for a transition away from colonial governance, but spelled out in detail the structure of regional transitional governments that would allow the colonized to transition out of imperial dominion. A report by the Royal Institute for International Affairs concluded that those who discussed colonization at the conference "agreed that the basic object of policy in the areas at present in colonial or dependent status must be the attainment of self-government at the earliest possible moment". Field, who interpreted the fate of colonialism as the central question in the conference, wrote that "the discussions that had to do with Southeast Asia were particularly significant". On this point, the attendees concluded that after the end of the war, Korea should become an independent country, but substantial international loans would have to be guaranteed to build up industrial economy in the new country. They also conjectured about the political structure that would best support an independent Korea. The delegates agreed that Burma and Thailand too could quickly become (or return to being) independent. However, they argued that "the time in which self-government could be obtained must vary for different people", since they believed that the people of some colonized regions were not capable of self-governance.

The conference also reached conclusions about the structure of the economic order after the war, especially in light of the poverty in East Asia and Southeast Asia at the time. The conference adopted statements to the effect that after the war countries must work together to ensure that everyone has some minimum standard of material well-being.

In Wolton's analysis, the conference's emphasis on the economic development of colonized areas was partly a political tactic used by the British delegation: by emphasizing that the economies of these areas needed to be developed, and further asserting that this economic development had to precede political development, they successfully postponed decisions about the political fates of their colonies. Wolton argues that even if the delegates generally agreed that colonial holdings should eventually be liberated, Hailey had been successful in providing a new defense of colonization for the near future: that Britain was a trustee that would ensure economic and social development in colonized areas, goals which were also grounded in the Atlantic Charter.

There were also some proposals brought up at the conference which failed completely to win support and were not included in its concluding documents. For example, some delegates recommended ending racial and ethnic quota in immigration to wealthy countries, and Hailey even raised this point in his opening address to the conference. However, most delegates believed that this was politically infeasible, even if they agreed that it should be done, and it was ultimately not a recommendation of the conference.

== Influence and legacy ==
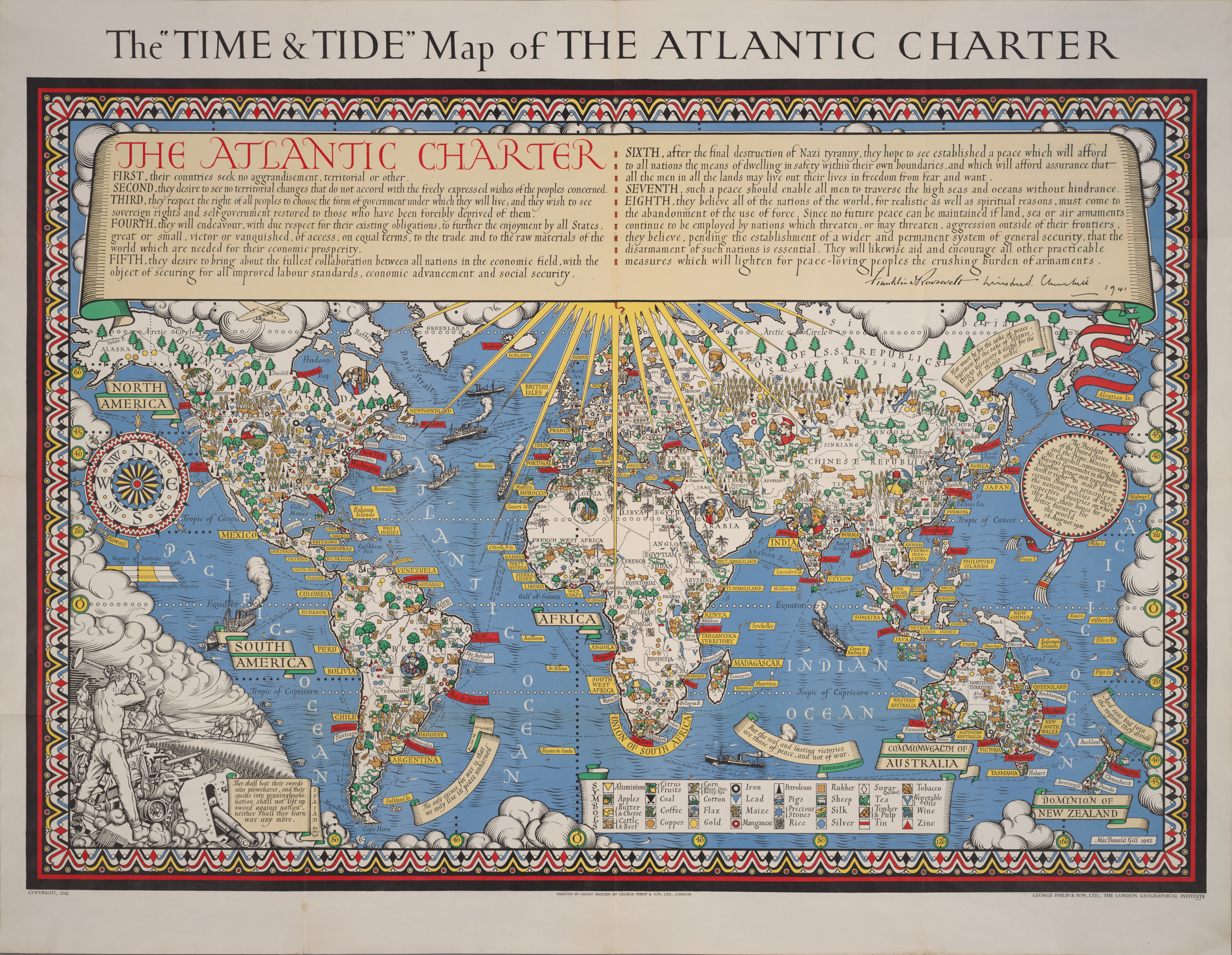
The conference was structured around competing interpretations of the Atlantic Charter.

Though the conference was about the prosecution of the war effort in the Pacific theatre as well as the postwar world order, it has mostly been studied for its engagement with the central question of how the colonial era would transition into a postwar international structure. Wolton wrote that "[t]he arguments raised at the conference engaged many of the issues of race and empire at stake during the war", and that these discussions are what make the conference historically interesting. The conference was an unofficial conference and the delegates met in their private capacity, so it has largely been studied as a moment that reflects discussions of the time, not as a cause of later developments. However, the historian Dayna Barnes has argued that wartime think tank conferences − of which Barnes names the Mont Tremblant Conference as one example − did have real historical impact.

The main feature of the conference in historical analyses of it is its detailed discussion of post-colonialism, and the way that delegates negotiated the transition from a world order in which stability was guaranteed by imperial power to a world order in which that same stability could only be achieved through international cooperation. The dispute between the British and American delegates on whether and how to transition away from colonialism was made obvious during the conference, and some delegates from other countries concluded that both the United Kingdom and the United States were not living up the ideals of the Atlantic Charter. The dispute between the American and British delegates, and the alignment of the remaining delegates into these two camps, has also been described as an important event in its own right; the historian Priscilla Roberts identified the Mont Tremblant conference as a landmark event in Canada's efforts to grow its role in international affairs and distance itself from British imperialism.

Modern analyses have drawn particular attention to the conference's rare − and in some cases unprecedented − inclusion of representatives from conquered or colonized countries in the Pacific region under discussion. Jung-hyoo Ko describes the Mont Tremblant conference as not just an early discussion of decolonization in general, but as one of the earliest detailed discussions about the structure and fate of a modern independent Korean state.

Even if the conference did not cause any major changes to the war effort or postwar international structure, some proposals at the conference did foreshadow important events. In one example, delegates from China proposed at the Tremblant Conference to create a decision-making nucleus within the United Nations that would give powerful countries a permanent voice in international affairs, and they voiced this idea a few years before the creation of the United Nations Security Council. Hailey's references to American racism, used as a rhetorical device to draw attention away from similar phenomena in other places, would also prove to be a useful device in later negotiations.

The fact that Alger Hiss and Frank Coe recommended Adlai Stevenson as an American delegate to the Mont Tremblant conference was used by Joseph McCarthy as a smear against Stevenson, after Hiss and Coe were revealed to have been spies; this attack was cited by Edward R. Murrow in the documentary on McCarthy, on See It Now, as an unreasonable attack.
