= Peter Harnetty =

English professor

Peter Francis Harnetty (born June 6, 1927) is professor emeritus of Asian Studies at the University of British Columbia.

== Personal ==
Harnetty was born June 6, 1927, in Brighton, England, to Edward and Anne (McKeon) Harnetty. He traveled from the UK to Canada to attend the University of British Columbia. In September 1956, he married Claire Demers. They have one son. Harnetty made an endowment for a grant called the Peter Harnetty Prize in Asian Studies that is awarded annually to undergraduate students.

== Non-teaching activities ==
=== Military service ===
Harnetty served in the British Army and British Indian Army from August 17, 1944 to January 13, 1949. His service included The Queen’s Royal Regiment in England (1944–45) and the 4/6 Rajputana Rifles in India (1945–46) He also served in Burma. He was transferred to the Royal Sussex Regiment while retaining his Lieutenancy and seniority on April 1, 1947. Later he was part of the Parachute Regiment (United Kingdom) in England, Palestine, and Germany.

=== Education ===
Harnetty received a Bachelor of Arts degree in History at the University of British Columbia in 1953 followed by a Masters of Arts (1954) and a Doctorate (1958) at Harvard University. Harnetty undertook post-doctoral research studies starting in the summer of 1964 at the India Office Library in London and the Manchester Central Reference Library after receiving a research fellowship from the Canada Council.

=== Politics ===
Harnetty was one of over 500 academics to sign a petition in 2015 in support of Fair Vote Canada.

== Professional ==
=== Teaching ===
Harnetty was hired as an instructor at the University of British Columbia in 1958. From 1958 to 1992, Harnetty held a joint appointment in the UBC Department of Asian Studies and the UBC Department of History. In fact, "the University inaugurated the teaching of South Asian courses with recruitment of [Harnetty]." In 1971, he was promoted to full professor. He served first as acting head of the Dept. of Asian Studies in 1970/71 and then as head 1975-1980. Upon his retirement in 1992, he was granted the status of Professor Emeritus.

=== Professional Committees ===
- Shastri Indo-Canadian Institute, President/Resident Director 1970–71.
- South Asia Regional Council of the Association for Asian Studies – Elected Member, 1973–76.
- Canadian Historical Association Committee on Graduate Studies, 1972–76.

=== Affiliations and memberships ===
- Elected in 1988 to be a Fellow of the Royal Historical Society.

=== Professional awards ===
- Woodrow Wilson National Fellowship Foundation fellow, 1953-54.
- Social Science Research Council fellow, 1956-57.
- Nuffield Foundation fellow, 1964-65.
- Canada Council senior fellow, 1964–65, 1971-72.
- Faculty of Arts Teaching Prize (now UBC Killam Teaching Prize), 1990.

== Publications ==
- HARNETTY, Peter. Imperialism and Free Trade. Lancashire and India in the Mid-Nineteenth Century. [Vancouver]: University of British Columbia; Manchester: Manchester University Press, 1973.

== Archival records ==
The records pertaining to Harnetty’s time as a professor at the University of British Columbia are located in the University of British Columbia Archives.
