= Chen Hansheng =

Chinese sociologist

- 陈翰笙
- Chen Hansheng
- Born: February 5, 1897; Wuxi, Jiangsu
- Died: March 13, 2004 (aged 107)
- Other name: Chen Han-seng
- Education: Pomona College (B.A.); University of Chicago (M.A.); Harvard University (Ph.D); University of Berlin (Ph.D)
- Known for: Pioneer of modern Chinese social science
- Scientific career
- Fields: Sociology
- Workplaces: Peking University
- Academic advisors: Charles Haskins

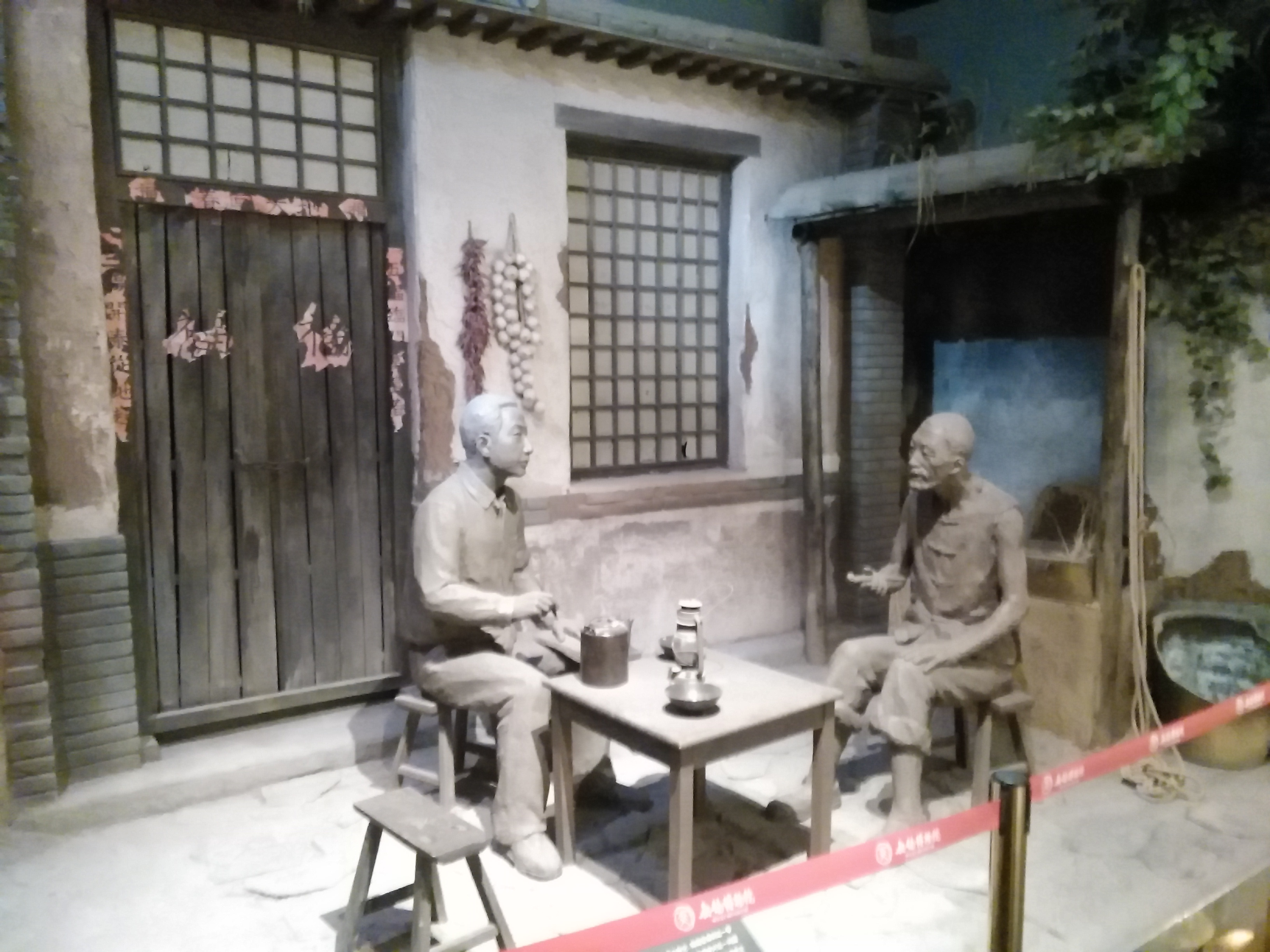
A statue of Chen at the Wuxi Museum, showing his visit to a farmer's home in Baoding to investigate agricultural production and family economic conditions

Chen Hansheng (February 5, 1897 – March 13, 2004), also known as Chen Han-seng and Geoffrey Chen, was a Chinese historian, sociologist and social activist considered a pioneer of modern Chinese social science. He was an underground spy for the Communist International, and active as a member of Richard Sorge's Tokyo ring that gathered intelligence for the Soviet Union on Japanese war plans. His prolific scholarship used innovative Marxist analysis that influenced both Chinese and international understandings of China's village economy and industrial structure. His biographer called him "China's last romantic revolutionary."

== Early life and education ==
Chen was born in Wuxi, Jiangsu. He graduated from Pomona College, earning Phi Beta Kappa with a BA in History in 1920. He then pursued an MA in History at The University of Chicago. In spring 1922, he enrolled at Harvard University where he obtained a PhD in history. During his time there, he assisted Charles Homer Haskins, a specialist in medieval Europe. A year later, he left the United States for Germany, and completed a second doctorate in history at Berlin University. In 1924, he returned to China and became one of the youngest professors at Peking University. Later he joined the Academia Sinica, working at the Institute of Social Science Research.

== Career as a scholar and underground Communist ==
Chen was recruited to the Comintern in 1924, by Li Dazhao, one of the founding members of the Chinese Communist Party. He kept this membership a secret until after the success of the Communist revolution in China. During the 1930s he conducted field research on the economic conditions in South China for the Institute for Social Science Research. In the resulting Landlord and Peasant in China (1936) Chen concluded that landlords exploited poor and middle peasants and that only radical political change could improve conditions. His book fortified Mao Zedong's analysis that the peasantry was exploited by the twin forces of landlord usury and foreign economic imperialism.

Chen became a member of the Richard Sorge spy ring, initially based in Shanghai, which gathered intelligence on Japanese war plans. When Sorge was reassigned to Tokyo, Chen went along and worked closely with Ozaki Hozumi and others of the ring until 1935, when the unexpected arrest of a messenger from Moscow almost exposed Chen's real identity. Chen sensed the danger and fled to Moscow.

After Chen fled from Tokyo to Moscow in 1935, Owen Lattimore, then the editor of the journal "Pacific Affairs", of the Institute of Pacific Relations (IPR), asked the Soviet Union, a member nation of IPR, for an assistant. Moscow recommended Chen Hansheng to Lattimore, who accepted. Chen then went to New York, and worked with Lattimore from 1936 until 1939, when he was reassigned by Communist intelligence chief Kang Sheng to Hong Kong. Chen stated in his memoirs that Lattimore was kept in the dark as to his true identity as a Communist agent, and that Lattimore's scholarly and publishing activities were only to be used as a cover for Chen.

At Hong Kong, Chen was responsible for running a network of dummy corporations funnelling huge amounts of money to the war effort of the Communist Party, mostly for the purpose of purchasing Japanese-made weapons from the Chinese collaborationist Wang Jingwei regime, whose military forces were rife with corruption and thoroughly demoralized.

In 1943 Chen moved to Guilin. Wanted by the Kuomintang authorities, he was rescued by the British and airlifted to India where he was recruited by British intelligence in New Delhi, after convincing the British that he had become disillusioned with communism. Between 1946 and 1950, Chen lived in the United States, working as a visiting scholar at the Johns Hopkins University in Maryland. While there, he was active as the Beijing's secret liaison with the Communist Party of the USA (CPUSA).

== Career in the People's Republic ==
Chen returned to China in 1950, and served as Director of the Institute of International Relations attached to the Ministry of Foreign Affairs, and as the founder and first Director of the Institute of World History of the Chinese Academy of Sciences (later part of the Chinese Academy of Social Sciences). Persecuted during the Cultural Revolution, he was put under house arrest for two years and often tortured; his wife was tortured to death in late 1968.

Chen was later reinstated, and served as Consultant of the Chinese Academy of Social Sciences, Honorary Director of the Institute of International Relations, professor of politics at Peking University, and editor-in-chief of the "World History Series" published by the Commercial Press. He told John Gittings, a British China specialist, in the early 1980s, however, that he now thought that Mao and the Party leadership in the Great Leap Forward had mixed politics, government, and economic management together with "disastrous results." At that point Chen said he still believed that peasants might be allowed control of genuine agricultural cooperatives, but soon the leadership showed it was more interested in power. He told Gittings in 1987 "the Chinese people are not stupid" and that there would soon be a "big political upheaval." When that "upheaval" came in the Tiananmen Massacre and crackdown of 1989, only Chen's advanced age spared him.

A centenarian, he died in Beijing in 2004, at the age of 107.

== Selected English language publications ==
=== Books ===
- Landlord and Peasant in China; a Study of the Agrarian Crisis in South China. Preface by Frederick V. Field
- The Present Agrarian Problem in China (Shanghai: China Institute of Pacific Relations).
- Notes on Migration of Nan Min to the Northeast (Shanghai: Published under the auspices of the China Council of the Institute of Pacific Relations, 1931).
- Prospects of Continued Resistance in China ([New York], 1938).
- with Wong Yin-seng, Industrial Capital and Chinese Peasants a Study of the Livelihood of Chinese Tobacco Cultivators, (1939)
- Gung Ho! The Story of the Chinese Cooperatives, (1947) At HathiTrust HERE
- Frontier Land Systems in Southernmost China: A Comparative Study of Agrarian Problems and Social Organization among the Pai Yi People of Yunnan and the Kamba People of Sikang (New York: International Secretariat, Institute of Pacific Relations, 1949).

=== Selected works in Chinese ===
- 四个时代 的 我 (Sige shidai de wo; My Life During Four Eras) (Beijing:Zhongguo wenshi chupan she [China Culture and History Press], 1988).
