= United States Senate Subcommittee on Internal Security =

Former U.S. Senate subcommittee

The United States Senate's Special Subcommittee to Investigate the Administration of the Internal Security Act and Other Internal Security Laws, 1951–77, known more commonly as the Senate Internal Security Subcommittee (SISS) and sometimes the McCarran Committee, was a subcommittee of the Senate Judiciary Committee, created in the wake of the McCarran Internal Security Act. The subcommittee investigated espionage, subversion, and related topics, similar to the older House Un-American Activities Committee. It had close relationships with the FBI. The Institute of Pacific Relations was the target of its first major investigation. The SISS was quietly disbanded in 1977 as part of a reorganization of the Senate Judiciary Committee.

== Organization and history ==
The subcommittee was authorized by S. 366, approved December 21, 1950, to study and investigate (1) the administration, operation, and enforcement of the Internal Security Act of 1950 (Pub. L. 81–831, also known as the McCarran Act) and other laws relating to espionage, sabotage, and the protection of the internal security of the United States and (2) the extent, nature, and effects of subversive activities in the United States "including, but not limited to, espionage, sabotage, and infiltration of persons who are or may be under the domination of the foreign government or organization controlling the world Communist movement or any movement seeking to overthrow the Government of the United States by force and violence". The resolution also authorized the subcommittee to subpoena witnesses and require the production of documents. Because of the nature of its investigations, the subcommittee is considered by some to be the Senate equivalent to the older House Un-American Activities Committee (HUAC).

The chairman of the subcommittee for the 82nd United States Congress was Patrick McCarran of Nevada. William Jenner of Indiana took over during the 83rd United States Congress after the Republicans gained control of the Senate in the 1952 election. When the Democrats regained control in the 84th Congress (1955–1957), James O. Eastland of Mississippi became chairman, a position he had until the subcommittee was abolished during 1977.

The subjects of its investigations during the 1950s included the formulation of U.S. foreign policy in Asia; the scope of Soviet activity in the United States; subversion in the Federal Government, particularly in the Department of State and Department of Defense; immigration; the United Nations; youth organizations; the television, radio, and entertainment industry; the telegraph industry; the defense industry; labor unions; and educational organizations. In the 1960s, the investigations were expanded to include civil rights and racial issues, campus disorders, and drug trafficking. The subcommittee published over 400 volumes of hearings and numerous reports, documents, and committee prints.

During March 1951, FBI officials began a formal liaison program with the SISS in contrast to the informal HUAC-FBI relationship, whereby SISS agreed to focus its hearings on "matters of current internal security significance...[and also] to help the Bureau in every possible manner". Under this program, the SISS forwarded to the FBI any confidential information they uncovered and the FBI conducted name checks on prospective SISS witnesses, submitted reports on targeted organizations, and provided memoranda "with appropriate leads and suggested clues". This was all intended to avert the perception that HUAC's purpose was to discredit the loyalty of officials of the Roosevelt and Truman administrations. This program reflected the FBI director's unqualified confidence in McCarran's ability to serve the cause of anticommunism and to protect the confidentiality of FBI sources.

=== Investigation into the Institute of Pacific Relations ===
The investigation of the Institute of Pacific Relations (IPR) was the first major investigation initiated by the subcommittee. Some people accused the IPR leadership of spying for the USSR. Owen Lattimore, editor of the IPR journal Pacific Affairs, was especially singled out for criticism. It is also believed that the pressure of the investigation triggered the suicide of the UN Assistant Secretary General Abraham Feller on November 13, 1952.

To investigate these charges, the SISS took possession of the older files of the IPR, which had been stored at the Lee, Massachusetts farm of Edward C. Carter, an IPR trustee. The subcommittee's investigators studied these records for 5 months, then held hearings from July 25, 1951 to June 20, 1952. The final report of the subcommittee was issued in July 1952 (S. Rpt. 2050, 82d Cong., 2d sess., Serial 11574).

A contemporary article in Time praised the McCarran Committee's investigation and report, saying that it "pulled together a strong case against the I.P.R. and has shown its influence on the U.S. Government to be a factor in U.S. policies that led to catastrophic losses in the Far East."

=== Amerasia investigation ===
In 1970, the Subcommittee published a two-volume report on Amerasia a journal with a number of communist staffers that had been investigated for unauthorized possession of government documents in the 1940s. The report ascribed the loss of China in part to the communist sympathies of the Chinese policy experts in the Foreign Service, known as the "China Hands".
