= Edward Clark Carter =

American activist

Edward Clark Carter (June 9, 1878 – November 9, 1954) worked with the International Y.M.C.A. in India and in France, during World War I, from 1902 to 1918, but was best known for his work with the Institute of Pacific Relations (IPR), of which he was secretary from 1926 to 1933, secretary general from 1933 to 1946 and executive vice-chairman from 1946 to 1948.

A graduate of Harvard University (Class of 1900), he worked to increase knowledge and dialogue with the countries of the Pacific Rim, but he also promoted interests and groups which critics charged were communist fronts or communist dominated. In 1948, he left the IPR under pressure and became Provost and then Director of International Studies of the New School for Social Research in New York City. Carter became a main target of the McCarran Committee as part of a general investigation of the U.S. Department of State by Senator Joseph McCarthy.

In 1940, he helped organize the Russian War Relief Fund, was chair (1941-1945); United States Service to China, director, (1948); United Nations Economic Commission for Asia and the Far East, consultant (1948); and a member of the United China Relief.

For a brief period in the early 1940s he also served as Editor of the journal Pacific Affairs, the primary publication of the IPR.

He was decorated an Officer of the Order of the British Empire, Officer of the French Légion d'honneur, received into the Order of the Crown of Siam and the Order of the Red Banner of Labour (USSR).

== Allegations ==
According to Carter's replacement as IPR Secretary General, Clayton Lane, Carter "was requested to resign" his leadership of the IPR "because of Carter's favorable attitude toward Russia."

Among the positions he held were:

- Secretary General of the Institute of Pacific Relations, an alleged "Communist front group"
- Chairman of the National Committee for Medical Aid to the Soviet Union, according to the Communist Party organ Daily Worker
- Chairman of Russian War Relief, which, according to the FBI, was "infiltrated with known Communists, Communist leaders, fellow travelers, and front organizations"
- President of the Board of Directors of the American Russian Institute, which was listed by Attorney General of the United States Thomas C. Clark on the Attorney General's List of Subversive Organizations for 1948, in accordance with President Truman's Executive Order 9835.

Andrew Avery, Chicago Journal of Commerce (July 1, 1946), alleged that Carter had been associated with such front organizations as the International Workers Order.

Carter was alleged to "actively uphold Russia's policies", for example, in 1938, when many other formerly loyal friends of the Soviet Union were becoming disillusioned by Joseph Stalin's "Great Purge", Carter defended the show trials, saying the Russian people "are thankful that their government has at last been firm in dealing with what they regard as Fascist-supported intrigue to overthrow the Government of the Soviet Union." This apologia was reprinted in full in Soviet Russia Today, which identified Carter as a frequent contributor to "our leading periodicals".

Carter also endorsed the Hitler-Stalin pact, according to the socialist magazine New Leader, but after the German invasion of the Soviet Union, he "proposed a toast to the success of the Soviet resistance to the Nazis and referred to Russia as the 'beloved Motherland of so many of us here tonight' and made a speech describing "the fight being waged by the Russian people in the defense of the democracies."

In 1938, Carter recommended Communist Party Secretary Earl Browder to a Canadian club as a possible speaker, saying that Browder, "contrary to the public view, is 100% American."

In a 1938 letter, IPR Trustee Owen Lattimore congratulated Carter: "I think that you are pretty cagey in turning over so much of the China section of the inquiry to Asiaticus, Han-seng and Chi. They will bring out the absolutely essential radical aspects, but can be depended on to do it with the right touch..." “Asiaticus” was the Polish-born Comintern agent Moses Wolf Grzyb, alias M. G. Shippe (or Schiffe), alias Hans (or Heinz) Muëller (or Moëller); “Han-seng” refers to Chen Han-seng, a Comintern recruit and "a member of the well-known Richard Sorge Spy Ring"; “Chi” was Red Chinese secret agent Chi Ch'ao-ting (Ji Chaoding).

Louis Budenz, former managing editor of the Daily Worker, told FBI investigators "that he had numerous dealings with Carter, while on the Daily Worker staff, and that these dealings 'were on a plane based on the fact that he was a member of the Communist Party.'" On April 22, 1948, Budenz advised, "Edward C. Carter was certainly under Communist Party discipline. I recall Jack Stachel, member of the national board of the Communist Party, stating that "Because the Russian War Relief Program is not going right, we will have to order Carter to realize his responsibility and continue his job. He is not running a community fund; he will have to live up to his Party responsibility."

One Teletype message in the FBI's IPR file cites a source (redacted) to the effect that there was, since 1936, "a concerted effort to install men who had been screened by [Frederick Vanderbilt] Field or Carter or other members of the IPR into the State Dept.”

Another memo in the file, by an IPR regional officer, alleges that Carter "may have been connected with the Communists in some way.... his political views are way to the left.... I have little confidence in his basic honesty."
