= Frederick Vanderbilt Field =

American leftist political activist and political writer

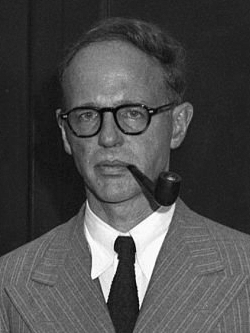
- Field in 1951
- Born: April 13, 1905
- Died: February 1, 2000 (aged 94); Minneapolis, Minnesota, U.S.
- Education: Harvard University; London School of Economics
- Spouse(s): Elizabeth Brown (1st), Edith Chamberlain Hunter (2nd), Anita Cohen Boyer (3rd), Nieves Orozco (4th)
- Parent(s): William Osgood Field; Lila Vanderbilt Sloane
- Relatives: Cornelius Vanderbilt (great-great-grandfather); Samuel Osgood (ancestor); Cyrus Field (ancestor)

Frederick Vanderbilt Field (April 13, 1905 – February 1, 2000) was an American leftist political activist, political writer and a great-great-grandson of railroad tycoon Cornelius "Commodore" Vanderbilt, disinherited by his wealthy relatives for his radical political views. Field became a specialist on Asia and was a prime staff member and supporter of the Institute of Pacific Relations. He also supported Henry Wallace's Progressive Party and so many openly Communist organizations that he was accused of being a member of the Communist Party. He was a top target of the American government during the peak of 1950s McCarthyism. Field denied ever having been a party member but admitted in his memoirs, "I suppose I was what the Party called a 'member at large.'"

== Early years ==
Field was born on April 13, 1905, a scion of the wealthy Vanderbilt family and a descendant of Corneilus Vanderbilt. A 1923 graduate of the private Hotchkiss School, Field went on to attend Harvard University, where he participated in undergraduate life as chief editor of The Harvard Crimson and a member of the Hasty Pudding Club. Graduating in 1927, Field spent a year at the London School of Economics, where he was exposed to the ideas of Harold Laski, the Fabian socialist political theorist, economist, and writer. First coming into politics as a supporter of the Democratic Party after returning to the United States, he was disillusioned by the Democrats' unwillingness to take a more uncompromising position toward social reform and endorsed Norman Thomas, the "Socialist" presidential candidate in 1928 and became a member of the Socialist Party. Having attracted significant attention as an unlikely endorsement for Norman Thomas, Field was cut off without a penny by Frederick William Vanderbilt, his great-uncle, from whom he had been promised an estimated fortune of more than $70 million.

Upon Field's return from England in 1928, Edward Clark Carter of the Institute of Pacific Relations (IPR) introduced him to Y.C. James Yen, who was then in the United States to raise support for his Chinese Mass Education Movement. Yen's enthusiasm for his movement to wipe out illiteracy roused Field's interest, and Carter sent Field to accompany Yen on a tour of the United States as his secretary. Field later recalled that Yen saw the country as a model for his own, while "I had doubts about the perfection of our democracy," and "being thrown in with the richest citizens in one city after another nurtured these doubts." Field and his new wife, Betty, then visited him in China.

== Institute of Pacific Relations and radical politics ==
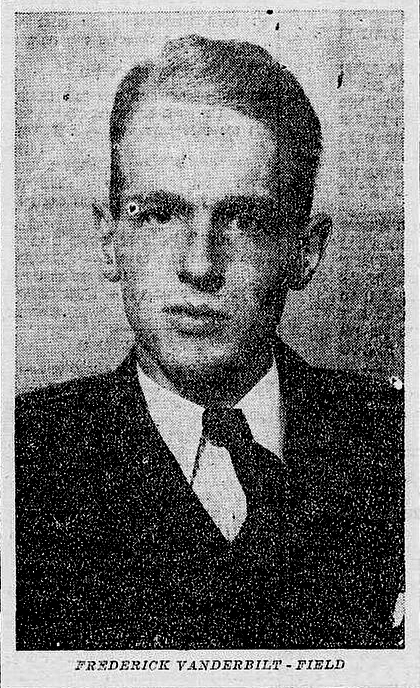
Field c. 1928

In 1929, Field joined the Institute of Pacific Relations, a group that brought together government and non-governmental elites to study problems of the Pacific rim nations, as an assistant to Carter. Field "took no pay; he was, in fact, one of the institute's most generous contributors." He published several reference works on the Asian economy and organized conferences and publications.

As he grew older, his politics became more radical. He described the IPR as "a bourgeois research-educational organization" funded by the Rockefeller and Carnegie foundations and some of the biggest corporations in the US, which he claimed subsidized his publication of proposals "as anticapitalistic as the articles he wrote for The New Masses and The Daily Worker." New Masses was identified by one scholar as the "semi-official spokesman of Communist letters" He was also Executive Vice-president of the Council for Pan American Democracy, which John Dewey's Committee for Cultural Freedom alleged in 1940 was under "outright communist control" and Provisional secretary of the board of directors for the Jefferson School of Social Science, associated with the Communist Party.

He wrote a memo cautioning Owen Lattimore, editor of the IPR quarterly Pacific Affairs, with regard to a certain article that "the analysis is a straight Marxist one and... should not be altered." He donated money and time to Communist causes in the 1930s, 1940s and 1950s, and during the war, he generously donated money to organizations close to the Soviet Union.

In his autobiography, Field confesses that during this period he "uncritically accepted" Soviet accounts of their political purges and that was "taken in." "Stalin was infallible," he recalled. "[A]ll my Communist surroundings told me so. So was [American Communist Party Secretary Earl] Browder, although on a lower level of sanctity, and so were the other CP [Communist Party] leaders."

At a time when other erstwhile loyal friends of the Soviet Union were becoming disillusioned by Stalin's Great Purge, Field defended the Moscow Trials "because Comrade Stalin says so, we have to believe the trials are just."

Since the IPR aimed to be nonpartisan and, in theory, still attempted to include even the Japanese point of view, he collaborated with his friend Philip Jaffe to set up the journal Amerasia in 1937 as a vehicle for criticism of Japanese attacks in China. Jaffe later pleaded guilty to "conspiracy to embezzle, steal and purloin" government property after Office of Strategic Services and FBI investigators found hundreds of government documents, many labeled "secret," "top secret," or "confidential," in the magazine's offices.

In 1941, he left his position at the IPR but served as a trustee until 1947. Field attended the 1945 United Nations founding conference in San Francisco as an IPR representative, and also as a writer for the Daily Worker.

== American Peace Mobilization ==
In 1940, Field became executive secretary of the American Peace Mobilization (APM), a position for which he had been recruited by Earl Browder himself. "Some time before the APM was formally organized," wrote Field, "Earl Browder asked me if I would accept the executive secretaryship if it were offered me." At APM, Field emerged as a committed pacifist, demanding that the United States stay out of the war in Europe, at least while the Hitler-Stalin pact lasted. His reasoning, as he would explain in his autobiography, was that "the European war in those early stages was one between rival imperialists, the British Empire and the Nazi Reich." By summer of the following year, however, Field came to a complete turnaround: on June 20, 1941, in his capacity as executive secretary, he suddenly called off the organization's "peace picketing" of the White House reversing himself to demand immediate war on Germany – just two days later, Nazi Germany would launch its surprise invasion of the Soviet Union.

According to the McCarran Committee's IPR Report, Lattimore, along with President Franklin D. Roosevelt's Administrative Assistant Lauchlin Currie (identified in the Venona decrypts as the Soviets' White House source codenamed "Page"), tried in 1942 to get Field a commission in military intelligence, but, unlike Duncan Lee (Venona code name "Koch"), Maurice Halperin ("Hare"), Julius Joseph ("Cautious"), Carl Marzani, Franz Neumann ("Ruff"), Helen Tenney ("Muse"), and Donald Wheeler ("Izra"), all of whom got into the OSS, Field was rejected as a security risk.

In 1944, dissident IPR member Alfred Kohlberg submitted to IPR Secretary General Edward C. Carter an 88-page analysis alleging that the institute had been infiltrated by pro-Communist elements. Among other things, Kohlberg alleged that Field was a member of the National Committee of the Communist Party. In 1945, former Soviet spy Elizabeth Bentley told FBI investigators that she had attended a conference in Field's home earlier that year. Also present, she alleged, were Browder, John Hazard Reynolds, head of the United States Service and Shipping Corporation (a Comintern front organization for Soviet espionage activities) and "Ray" Elson (Identified in the "Gorsky memo" under the cover name "Irma")

In 1945 Field was one of the founding members of the Committee for a Democratic Far Eastern Policy, which tried to influence US policy to stop supporting the Kuomintang government in China, and after 1949 to recognize the People's Republic of China.

On April 22, 1948, Louis Budenz, former managing editor of the Daily Worker, advised FBI investigators, "Field is a Communist Party member." In 1949, Field identified himself in Political Affairs as an "American Communist."

== Anti-colonialism and Pan-Africanism ==
Vanderbilt Field was the main donor to the Council on African Affairs, an anti-colonialist and Pan-African organization.

== Civil rights activities ==
Field took an active role in the operation of the Civil Rights Congress, a leftist group of civil rights advocates formed from the merger of the International Labor Defense (ILD), the National Negro Congress, and the National Federation for Constitutional Liberties in Detroit in 1946. The organization concentrated on legal action and political protest, notably publicizing the 1955 lynching of 14-year-old boy Emmett Till and publishing the 1951 document We Charge Genocide. It also helped to pioneer many of the tactics that would be employed by later civil rights workers. Field simultaneously acted as both secretary and trustee of the Civil Rights Congress bail fund.

== Tydings Committee ==
In 1950, Budenz testified before the Tydings Committee to personal knowledge that Field was a Soviet espionage agent. Questioned, Field refused to answer on grounds of potential self-incrimination. The following year, former Soviet spy Whittaker Chambers testified before the McCarran Committee that NKVD "handler" J. Peters told him, in 1937, that Field was a member of the Communist underground. Herbert Romerstein, former head of the office to Counter Soviet Disinformation at the United States Information Agency, and the late Eric Breindel placed Field in the GRU apparat, alleging that he "was an agent of Soviet military intelligence."

Yet, writers Kai Bird and Svetlana Chervonnaya, examining the archives in an article of The American Scholar, disagree:

Documents show that he was in contact with various Soviet representatives in the United States beginning in early 1935. Some of these interactions may be described as 'active measures' on behalf of the Soviet Union. Still, what we know does not prove that Field was a full-blown Soviet agent.

As secretary of the Civil Rights Congress bail fund, Field refused to reveal who had put up bond for eight Communist Party officials, who had jumped bail and disappeared after being convicted by the Truman administration Department of Justice for violations of the Smith Act. Convicted of contempt of court since he would not provide the names of any of his Communist friends, Field served two months of a 90-day sentence in federal prison at Ashland, Kentucky, in 1951.

== Mexican exile ==
Field at one point moved with his fourth wife to Mexico in a "self-imposed exile", but he kept up many of his associations. A 1962 visit by Marilyn Monroe was monitored by the FBI out of concern over the actress's connections to Communism, and a "mutual infatuation" between her and Field concerned both "some in her inner circle, including her therapist", according to investigators' files. There was "dismay among her entourage and also among the (American Communist Group in Mexico)." Those file notations were kept redacted until a FOIA request in 2012.

== Personal life and death ==
Field married four times. His first wife was Elizabeth ("Betty") G. Brown of Duluth, Minnesota, who was a socialist. His second wife, Edith Chamberlain Hunter, supported the Council on African Affairs headed by Max Yergan. His third wife was Anita Cohen Boyer, ex-wife of Raymond Boyer, convicted in a Canadian spy case. His fourth wife was Nieves Orozco, a former model of Diego Rivera.

Field died age 94 on February 1, 2000, at the Walker Methodist Health Center in Minneapolis, where he had been living since his return from Mexico in 1983.

== Works ==
In his 1983 memoir, Field did not hesitate to use highly biased language against his accusers. He accused Louis F. Budenz of seeking to injure him. He called Whittaker Chambers "a neurotic psychopath." He devoted a whole chapter to "The Lattimore Case," which involved him. He also acknowledged IPR's Edward Clark Carter, who "gave me every opportunity to develop whatever administrative and research abilities I might have."

== Publications ==
=== Books ===
- American Participation in the China Consortiums (Pub. for the American Council, Institute of Pacific Relations by the University of Chicago Press, 1931)
- Economic Handbook of the Pacific Area (Doubleday, 1934)
- Thoughts on the Meaning and Use of Pre-Hispanic Mexican Sellos (Dumbarton Oaks, Trustees for Harvard University, 1967)
- Field, Frederick V. (1983). From Right to Left: An Autobiography. Brooklyn: Lawrence Hill. ISBN 9780882081625. Internet Archive online for reading here

=== Articles and shorter publications ===
- China's Capacity for Resistance (American Council, Institute of Pacific Relations, 1937)
- China's Greatest Crisis (New Century Publishers, 1945)
