= Institute of Pacific Relations =

Non-governmental organization

- Successor: Pacific Basin Economic Council & Pacific Trade and Development Conference
- Established: 1925
- Founder: Edward C. Carter
- Dissolved: 1960
- Type: Non-governmental organization
- Purpose: To provide a forum for discussion between Pacific Rim nations.
- Headquarters: Honolulu, later New York
- Official language: English
- Key people: Jerome Davis Greene, Frederick Vanderbilt Field, Owen Lattimore, William L. Holland,
- Publication: Far Eastern Survey; Imparel; Pacific Affairs
- Affiliations: Rockefeller Foundation, Carnegie Foundation

The Institute of Pacific Relations (IPR) was an international NGO established in 1925 to provide a forum for discussion of problems and relations between nations of the Pacific Rim. The International Secretariat, the center of most IPR activity over the years, consisted of professional staff members who recommended policy to the Pacific Council and administered the international program. The various national councils were responsible for national, regional and local programming. Most participants were members of the business and academic communities in their respective countries. Funding came largely from businesses and philanthropies, especially the Rockefeller Foundation. IPR international headquarters were in Honolulu until the early 1930s when they were moved to New York and the American Council emerged as the dominant national council.

The IPR was founded in the spirit of Wilsonianism, an awareness of the United States' new role as a world power after World War I, and a belief that liberal democracy should be promoted throughout the world. To promote greater knowledge of issues, the IPR supported conferences, research projects and publications, and after 1932 published a quarterly journal Pacific Affairs.

After World War II, charges that the IPR had been infiltrated by communists led to Congressional hearings and the loss of tax exempt status. The investigation of the IPR was the first major investigation initiated by the Senate Internal Security Subcommittee. Many IPR members had liberal left orientations typical of internationalists of the 1930s, some ten IPR associates were shown to have been communists, others were sympathetic to the Soviet Union, and the anti-imperialist tone of the leadership aroused resentment from some of the colonial powers. However, the more dramatic charges made at the time, such as that the IPR was responsible for the loss of China, have not been generally accepted.

== Founding and early years (1925–1939) ==
The IPR was the result of two sets of organizers, one in New York, another in Hawai'i. The New York-based effort was organized by Edward C. Carter. After graduating from Harvard in 1906, Carter joined the Student Volunteer Movement with the YMCA in India, then worked with the Y in France during World War I. After the war he joined The Inquiry, a liberal Protestant commission with a flavor both genteel and militant which organized conferences and publications on labor, race relations, business ethics, and international peace. Among Carter's constituents were John D. Rockefeller, III, Abby Aldrich Rockefeller, daughter of|Rhode Island Senator Nelson Wilmarth Aldrich, and Dr. Ray Lyman Wilbur, President of Stanford University. Wilbur argued that a new organization devoted to Pacific affairs would fill a gap not addressed by East Coast foreign policy groups. Meanwhile, in Hawai'i, another group was organizing under the leadership of local business interests.

Not everyone approved. Time Magazine called Carter, Wilbur, and The Inquiry a "strange and motley crew", a "little band of élite and erudite adventurers." Some in the American State Department and Navy opposed discussion of Pacific affairs, fearing that it might interfere with strategic planning at a time when Chinese and Japanese nationalism were on the rise. Carter countered with support from the Rockefeller Foundation and the Carnegie Foundation. Using networks of the International YMCA, independent National Councils were organized in other countries, with an International Secretariat in Honolulu.

=== Conferences ===
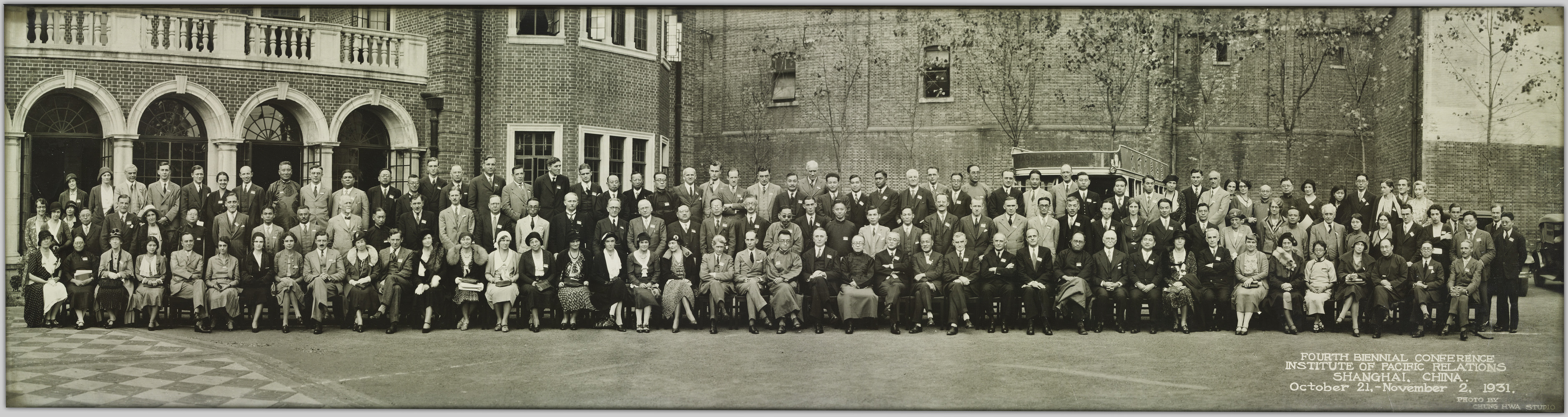
Attendees of the Fourth Biennial Conference in Shanghai, China, October 21 to November 2, 1931.

The first conference was held in Honolulu in the summer of 1925, followed by another in Honolulu (1927), then conferences in Kyoto (1929), Hangzhou and Shanghai (1931), Banff, Canada (1933), Yosemite, USA (1936), and Virginia Beach, USA (1939). Each conference published its background papers and roundtable discussions in a volume in the series Problems of the Pacific.

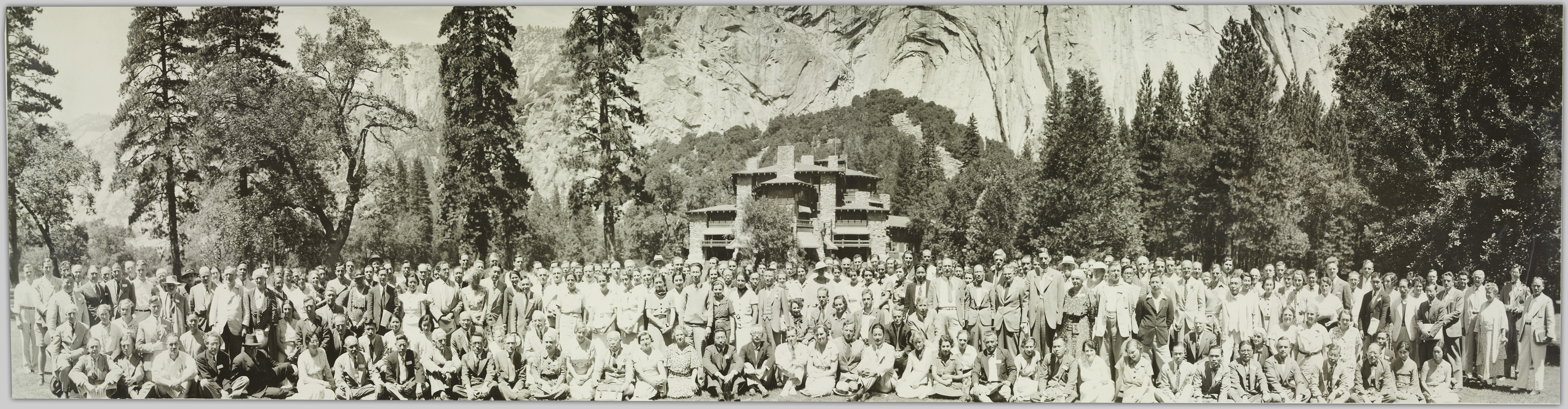
Attendees of the sixth conference in Yosemite, 1936.

=== American Council leadership ===
Edward Carter took responsibility for the American Council. When he became Secretary General in 1933 he lobbied successfully to have the International Headquarters move to New York. Since 1928 his chief assistant had been Frederick V. Field, who worked with him until 1940. (Field was later attacked for his communist allegiances: see below.) The American Council moved energetically on several fronts. One of Carter's concerns was that public opinion needed to be informed and school curriculums deepened. Another area was to commission or subsidize scholarship on all aspects of Asia. Over the next decades, the IPR imprint appeared on hundreds of books, including most of the important scholarship on China, Japan, and Southeast Asia. Notable was the Chinese Dynastic History Project, headed by the German refugee scholar Karl Wittfogel, which set out to translate and annotate the official histories compiled by each Chinese dynasty for its predecessor. In 1932, the IPR determined to expand its Bulletin into a full-fledged journal, Pacific Affairs. At the recommendation of longtime treaty port journalist H.G.E. Woodhead, Carter recruited Owen Lattimore, a multi-sided scholar of Central Asia who, however, did not have a Ph.D.

The IPR aimed to include all of the countries of the Pacific, including colonies, such as the Philippines and Korea (the Dutch government forbade participation from the Dutch East Indies), and the Soviet Union. As friction between Japan and China became more intense, the IPR became more overtly political. In 1931, the Japanese invasion forced the IPR's conference to move from Hangzhou to Shanghai. In 1932, the Japanese delegation withdrew and succeeding conferences were held without Japanese representation. Since the USSR was a longtime rival of Japan and a revolutionary Marxist power, Soviet participation raised many questions and problems. Marxist analysis, such as that brought by Wittfogel, was considered by some to add a powerful tool for understanding Chinese history, but Stalin's interest was scarcely limited to discussions and theories. Carter's sympathy for the Soviet Union led him to defend Stalin's purges and trials, although IPR publications contained both favorable and critical treatments of Soviet policies.

The IPR sponsored other important scholarly excursions into Asian history and society: R.H. Tawney's long memo for the 1931 conference was published as his Land and Labor in China (1931); a Marxist analysis of geography by Chi Ch'ao-ting; and the collaboration between Lattimore and Wittfogel which used an eclectic array of approaches including Arnold Toynbee, Ellsworth Huntington, and Karl Marx to develop a social history of China.

== The war years ==
During World War II, the IPR organized two conferences, one at Mont Tremblant, Quebec, in December 1942 and the second at Hot Springs, Virginia in January 1945. One scholar noted that the non-official nature of these meetings meant that officials and influential leaders could join in the fray in an ostensibly private capacity, which "gave the I.P.R. a status well beyond its actual size." Colonial issues, economic issues and post-war planning were the major areas of controversy. The Americans demanded that European colonial markets be opened to American goods by the removal of preference tariffs while the British expressed concerns that American economic might could be used as a "potential bludgeon". Vijaya Lakshmi Pandit of India asserted that the conflict in Asia was a race war, and other members of the conference from Asia warned that too harsh a treatment of Japan would lead to anti-Western feeling throughout the Far East.

At the roundtables, there was criticism as well as doubt that the British would follow the Atlantic Charter. The British pointed out that high-flown ideas were being pushed on them while American willingness to apply the same ideals within its own borders was questionable. Those in the International Secretariat were suspicious and critical of the British, noting that the delegation from India was more British than the British. Those representing American interests repeatedly insisted they were not fighting in order to reconstitute the British Empire; the representatives of the British concern replied that they would "not be hustled out of evolution into revolution," and that the US might "do well to look into her own Negro problem."

As part of IPR's lasting impact in the region, the conferences helped to focus on the political and social developments within Japan after the war, especially the question of whether to abolish the imperial throne. Edward Carter summarized Anglo-American differences and fears: of "continuing imperialism as a threat to world peace", on the one hand, and of "anti-colonialism as a recipe for chaos" on the other; also of "imperial tariff protections as a barrier to world trade and of American economic might as a potential bludgeon." Some have suggested that Carter left the Secretary General position in late 1945 because of pressure from the European council leaders due to his increasingly outspoken anti-colonialism.

At home, the American Secretariat came under criticism.

== Attacks over alleged communist influences and demise ==
Toward the end of the war, the Institute came under criticism for alleged communist sympathies. The first major criticism of the Institute was a wartime study by dissident IPR member Alfred Kohlberg, an American who had owned a textile firm in prewar China. After finding what he believed were communist sympathies in IPR, in particular Frederick Vanderbilt Field, Kohlberg first wrote to other members of the Board, published an 80-page report, then launched a publicity campaign against the Institute.

The IPR came under further suspicion by government authorities as a result of the Venona intercepts and its close association with Amerasia. Amerasia came under investigation when a classified Office of Strategic Services report appeared as an article in the magazine.

The IPR was closely allied with Amerasia. The two organizations shared the same building, and many members of the editorial board of Amerasia were officers or employees of the IPR. An FBI review of Amerasia and IPR publications found that approximately 115 people contributed articles to both. The Committee for a Democratic Far Eastern Policy was also housed in this building.

Among IPR staffers claimed to be communists or collaborators with Soviet intelligence agents were Kathleen Barnes, Hilda Austern, Elsie Fairfax-Cholmely, Chi Chao-ting, Guenter Stein, Harriet Levine, Talitha Gerlach, Chen Han-seng (a member of the Sorge spy ring), Michael Greenberg (named as a source in 1945 by defecting Soviet courier Elizabeth Bentley), and T.A. Bisson (Venona's "Arthur"), as well as Kate Mitchell and Andrew Roth, both of whom were arrested in the 1945 Amerasia case.

After the success of the Chinese Communist Revolution, criticism of the IPR increased. Its detractors accused it of having helped to "lose China" to communism.

In the early fifties, the IPR came under a lengthy investigation by the Senate Internal Security Subcommittee. Critics charged that IPR scholars had been naïve in their statements regarding communism, Chinese communism and Stalinist Russia.

Senator Joseph McCarthy of Wisconsin repeatedly criticized IPR and its former chairman Philip Jessup. McCarthy observed that Frederick V. Field, T.A. Bisson, and Owen Lattimore were active in IPR and claimed that they had worked to turn American China policy in favor of the Chinese Communist Party.

In 1952, the Senate Internal Security Subcommittee (SISS), chaired by Senator Pat McCarran, spent over a year reviewing some 20,000 documents from the files of IPR and questioning IPR personnel. The committee found it suspicious that Marxists had published articles in the IPR journal and that communists had attended an IPR conference in 1942. In its final report the SISS stated:

The IPR itself was like a specialized political flypaper in its attractive power for Communists ...The IPR has been considered by the American Communist Party and by Soviet officials as an instrument of Communist policy, propaganda and military intelligence. The IPR disseminated and sought to popularize false information including information originating from Soviet and Communist sources...The IPR was a vehicle used by the Communists to orient American far eastern policies toward Communist objectives.

Elizabeth Bentley testified that NKVD spy chief Jacob Golos warned her to stay away from the IPR because it was "as red as a rose, and you shouldn't touch it with a 10-foot pole." Likewise, Louis Budenz, former editor of the Daily Worker, testified that Alexander Trachtenberg of the Communist Party-affiliated International Publishers told him that party leaders thought the IPR was "too much a concentration point for Communists; the control could be maintained without such a galaxy of Communists in it."

The IPR lost its tax-exempt status as an educational body in 1955, when the Internal Revenue Service alleged that the Institute had engaged in the dissemination of controversial and partisan propaganda, and had attempted to influence the policies or opinions of the government. Under the leadership of William L. Holland, the IPR pursued a long legal action to regain tax-exempt status, which lasted until 1959. The final court judgment rejected all allegations by the Internal Revenue Service.

By the mid-1950s, the IPR was facing other challenges – notably the development of well-funded centers for Asian Studies at major American universities such as Harvard, Yale, Berkeley, Michigan and Columbia. The rise of these centers created a perception that the IPR was no longer necessary. The large foundations which had previously supported the IPR shifted their financial resources to the university centers.

At the end of the IRS case, a degree of financial support that the Institute had attracted due to free speech issues and the IRS case was lost to other causes. The IPR also had been gradually losing academic contributors due in part to the rise of the US based Association for Asian Studies.

The Institute of Pacific Relations was dissolved in 1960. However, it became the catalyst for the 1961 founding of the Department of Asian Studies at the University of British Columbia (UBC). In 1960, publication of the journal Pacific Affairs, which William L. Holland continued to edit, was transferred to UBC, which has continued its publication to the present.This initiative was taken by then UBC President Norman MacKenzie, a founding member of the Canadian Institute of International Affairs. MacKenzie brought Holland from the US to UBC in 1961 to head a new Department of Asian Studies, which was an outgrowth of the original purpose of the IPR founders. Holland brought with him much of the now defunct IPR's archives.

A few years later two successor organizations were established, the Hong Kong based Pacific Basin Economic Council, an organization of regional business leaders founded in 1967, and the more academic Australian based Pacific Trade and Development Conference (PAFTAD) in 1968.

== Publications ==
=== International Secretariat ===
The International Secretariat had a publishing program that included a Research Series, an Inquiry Series, and a quarterly journal, Pacific Affairs. The American Council participated in this program.

=== American Council ===
The American Council published two periodicals of their own, a fortnightly journal Far Eastern Affairs and the biweekly Imparel, a mimeographed summary of the news issued by the San Francisco Bay Region Division. The Council additionally published research volumes as a part of their Studies of the Pacific series, and more popular studies under their Far Eastern Pamphlets series. Throughout the 1920s to the 1950s, the Council commissioned immigration advocate Bruno Lasker to travel to East and Southeast Asia, resulting in several studies on immigration and relations with the West.

== See also ==
- Philip J. Jaffe
- Council on Foreign Relations
