= William L. Holland =

New Zealand academic

William Lancelot Holland (28 December 1907 – 8 May 2008) worked with the Institute of Pacific Relations from 1928 until 1960 as Research Secretary; American IPR Executive Secretary and editor of its periodical, Far Eastern Survey; IPR Secretary-General and editor of its journal, Pacific Affairs. He taught at University of British Columbia from 1961 to 1970.

Holland, the oldest of four sons, was born in South Malvern, Canterbury, New Zealand and went to Timaru Boys' High School. He graduated from Canterbury College in Christchurch, in 1928. His father was a sheep farmer and railroad worker, and Holland worked on sheep stations to put himself through school.

At the age of 21 Holland sailed to Kyoto, Japan to assist at the 1932 Institute of Pacific Relations Conference. Edward C. Carter, head of the American branch, invited him to join the Secretariat, and Holland was to work for the IPR until it went out of operation in 1960. In 1934, he took a master's degree at King's College, Cambridge University, in economics, studying with John Maynard Keynes among others. In 1944, he became an American citizen in order to accept the position of acting director of the Office of War Information in Chongqing, China.

In the early 1950s congressional charges that the IPR was under communist influences, although never substantiated, seriously impaired the ability to operate. Edward Carter left the American IPR, and Holland became Executive Secretary and editor of its journal, Pacific Affairs. The University of British Columbia in Vancouver, Canada, invited Holland to become the head of the newly created Department of Asian Studies, and to bring Pacific Affairs with him. He joined the faculty in 1961 and helped build UBC into a leading center for research on Asia. He became professor emeritus in 1972, continuing to edit Pacific Affairs until 1978. In 1989 the university awarded him an honorary Doctor of Laws.

In 1932, in Hong Kong, he married Doreen Patricia McGarry of Auckland, New Zealand. In 1990, following his wife's death, he moved to Amherst, Massachusetts, to live with his only child, Patricia G. Holland.

Holland died in Amherst, Massachusetts in May 2008.

Holland's papers are at Columbia University, the University of British Columbia, and the University of Hawai'i. In 2003 he established the William L. Holland Prize for the best article published each year in Pacific Affairs.

== Publications ==
Books

- Commodity Control in the Pacific Area. Stanford, Calif.: Stanford University Press (1935).
- Asian Nationalism and the West: A Symposium Based on Documents and Reports of the Eleventh Conference, Institute of Pacific Relations. New York: Macmillan (1953).

Articles

- "Source Materials on the Institute of Pacific Relations." Pacific Affairs, vol. 58, no. 1 (Spring 1985), pp. 91–97. JSTOR 2758011.

Pamphlets

- Meet the Anzacs!, with Philip E. Lilienthal. Far Eastern Pamphlets No. 7. New York: Institute of Pacific Relations (American Council) (1942).
