= Amerasia =

Journal of Far Eastern affairs (1937–1947)

Amerasia was a journal of Far Eastern affairs best known for the 1940s "Amerasia Affair" in which several of its staff and their contacts were suspected of espionage and charged with unauthorized possession of government documents.

== Publication ==
The journal was founded in 1937 by Frederick Vanderbilt Field, who also chaired the editorial board, and Philip Jaffe, a naturalized American born in the Ukrainian part of the Russian Empire near Poltava. It was edited by Jaffe and Kate L. Mitchell. Field was the publication's chief financial backer. Jaffe was a friend of Earl Browder, general secretary of the Communist Party of the United States. The journal's staffers and writers included a number of communists or former communists, including Chi Ch'ao-ting, and at one time Joseph Milton Bernstein, who has been alleged to be a Soviet agent. The journal had a small circulation and sold for fifteen cents a copy. It ceased publication in 1947.

== Government documents case ==
Kenneth Wells, an analyst for the Office of Strategic Services (OSS), noticed that an article printed in the January 26, 1945, issue of Amerasia was almost identical to a 1944 report he had written on Thailand. OSS agents investigated by breaking into the New York offices of Amerasia on March 11, 1945, where they found hundreds of classified documents from the Department of State, the Navy, and the OSS.

The OSS notified the State Department, which asked the Federal Bureau of Investigation (FBI) to investigate. The FBI's investigation indicated that Jaffe and Mitchell had probably obtained the documents from Emanuel Larsen, a State Department employee, and Andrew Roth, a lieutenant with the Office of Naval Intelligence. Other suspects include freelance reporter Mark Gayn, whose coverage of the war in Asia appeared regularly in Collier's and Time magazine, and State Department "China Hand" John S. Service.

FBI surveillance established that Jaffe met with Service several times in Washington and New York and reported that at one meeting "Service, according to the microphone surveillance, apparently gave Jaffe a document which dealt with matters the Chinese had furnished to the United States government in confidence."

An FBI summary reported that Jaffe visited the Soviet consulate in New York and that two days after a meeting with Service, Jaffe had a four-hour meeting in his home with Communist Party Secretary Earl Browder and Tung Pi-wu, the Chinese Communist representative to the United Nations Charter Conference.

In carrying out its investigation, the FBI broke into the offices of Amerasia and the homes of Gayn and Larsen and installed bugs and phone taps.

On June 6, 1945, the FBI arrested Jaffe, Mitchell, Larsen, Roth, Gayn and Service. Simultaneously, the Amerasia offices were raided and 1,700 classified State Department, Navy, OSS, and Office of War Information documents were seized.

Because no evidence was found indicating that any documents had been forwarded directly to a foreign power, the Justice Department decided not to seek an indictment under the Espionage Act. Instead, it sought to indict the six for unauthorized possession and transmittal of government documents. Service, the only State Department officer arrested, had given Jaffe approximately eight documents, copies of his own reports on conditions in China, that represented non-sensitive intelligence that diplomats routinely shared with journalists. The grand jury voted unanimously against indicting him.

The grand jury indicted Jaffe, Larsen, and Roth. Before the trial began, Larsen's defense attorney learned of the FBI's illegal break-in at Larsen's home. The Justice Department, fearing a loss at trial if evidence were excluded because it was obtained illegally, arranged a deal. Jaffe agreed to plead guilty and pay a fine of $2,500, while Larsen pleaded no contest and was fined $500. The charges against Roth were dropped.

== Congressional investigations ==
The "Amerasia Affair" became a touchstone for those who wanted to raise alarms about espionage and the possible communist infiltration of the State Department. Senator Joseph McCarthy often spoke of the case in these terms, maintaining that it was a security breach and cover-up of immense proportions.

In 1946, a House Judiciary subcommittee chaired by Rep. Samuel F. Hobbs and, in 1950, the Senate Foreign Relations Subcommittee on the Investigation of Loyalty of State Department Employees, commonly known as the Tydings Committee, investigated the Amerasia case. In 1955, the Senate Internal Security Subcommittee sought the Amerasia materials from the Justice Department. The records were declassified and the Justice Department delivered 1,260 documents to the Subcommittee in 1956 and 1957.

The Senate Internal Security Subcommittee published a two-volume report, The Amerasia Papers: A Clue to the Catastrophe of China, in 1970. It ascribed the loss of China in part to the communist sympathies of the Chinese policy experts in the Foreign Service, known as the "China Hands".

== See also ==
- Institute of Pacific Relations
- Espionage Act of 1917
