= Owen Lattimore =

American Orientalist and writer (1900–1989)

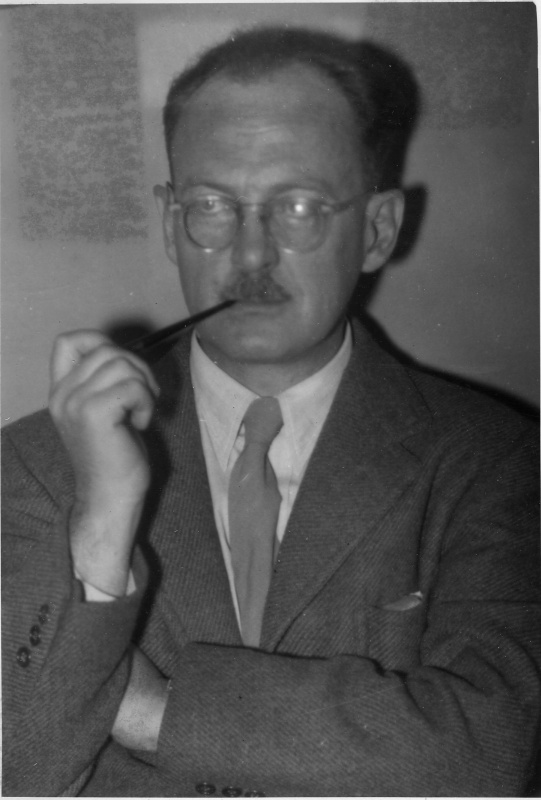
- Owen Lattimore (around 1945)
- Born: July 27, 1900; Washington, D.C., US
- Died: May 31, 1989 (aged 88); Providence, Rhode Island, US
- Other name: Chinese: 欧文·拉铁摩尔
- Occupations: Orientalist, writer

Owen Lattimore (July 29, 1900 – May 31, 1989) was an American Orientalist and writer. He was an influential scholar of China and Central Asia, especially Mongolia. Although he never earned a college degree, in the 1930s he was editor of Pacific Affairs, a journal published by the Institute of Pacific Relations, and taught at Johns Hopkins University from 1938 to 1963. He was director of the Walter Hines Page School of International Relations from 1939 to 1953. During World War II, he was an advisor to Chiang Kai-shek and the American government and contributed extensively to the public debate on U.S. policy toward Asia. From 1963 to 1970, Lattimore was the first Professor of Chinese Studies at the University of Leeds in England.

In the early post-war period of McCarthyism and the Red Scare, American wartime "China Hands" were accused of being agents of the Soviet Union or under the influence of Marxism, especially after the "loss of China" in 1949. In 1950, Senator Joseph McCarthy accused Lattimore in particular of being "the top Russian espionage agent in the United States." The accusations led to years of Congressional hearings that did not substantiate the charge that Lattimore had been a spy. Soviet Venona cables, decoded during WWII and declassified decades later, did not refer to Lattimore as one of the Soviet agents active in the US. The hearings did document Lattimore's sympathetic statements about Stalin and the Soviet Union, however. In 1988 Chen Han-shen, a member of the Sorge spy ring, mentioned in his memoirs that Lattimore placed a request for a Chinese assistant through Comintern channels. Chen's superiors dispatched him to the United States in 1936 to serve as Lattimore's coeditor at Pacific Affairs, a position Chen used to carry out espionage activities in New York, with the help of another agent, Rao Shu-shi. The controversy put an end to Lattimore's role as a consultant of the U.S. State Department and eventually to his academic career. He died in 1989 in Providence, Rhode Island, having resided in his later years in Pawtucket.

William T. Rowe wrote that Lattimore's "lifetime intellectual project was to develop a 'scientific' model of the way human societies form, evolve, grow, decline, mutate and interact with one another along 'frontiers'." He eclectically absorbed and often abandoned influential theories of his day that dealt with the great themes of history. These included the ecological determinism of Ellsworth Huntington; biological racism, though only to the extent of seeing characteristics which grew out of ecology; the economic geography and location theory; and some aspects of Marxist modes of production and stages of history, especially through the influence of Karl August Wittfogel. The most important and lasting influence, however, was Arnold J. Toynbee and his treatment of the great civilizations as organic wholes which were born, matured, grew old, and died. Lattimore's most influential book, The Inner Asian Frontiers of China (1940), used these theories to explain the history of East Asia not as the history of China and its influence on its neighbors, but as the interaction between two types of civilizations, settled farming and pastoral, each of which had its role in changing the other.

== Early life and travel ==
"A halt on the march": Owen Lattimore in late 1926, on his first journey across Inner Asia. His diary from this journey on the "desert road to Turkestan" enabled him to write his first book, the start of his career as a scholar of the region.

Born in the United States, Lattimore was raised in Tianjin, China, where his parents, David and Margaret Lattimore, were English teachers at a Chinese university. (His brother was the poet and classics scholar and translator Richmond Lattimore. One of his sisters was author Eleanor Frances Lattimore.)

After being schooled at home by his mother, he left China at the age of twelve and attended Collège Classique Cantonal near Lausanne, Switzerland. After war broke out in 1914, he was sent to England, where he was enrolled at St Bees School, Cumbria, England (1915–1919). He pursued literary interests, especially poetry, and briefly converted to Catholicism. He did well on the entrance exams for Oxford University, but returned to China in 1919 when it turned out that he would not have enough funds for attending university.

He worked first for a newspaper and then for a British import/export related business. This gave him the opportunity to travel extensively in China and time to study Chinese with an old-fashioned Confucian scholar. His commercial travels also gave him a feel for the realities of life and the economy. A turning point was negotiating the passage of a trainload of wool through the lines of two battling warlords early in 1925, an experience which led him the next year to follow the caravans across Inner Mongolia to the end of the line in Xinjiang.

The managers of his firm saw no advantage in subsidizing his travels but did send him to spend a final year of employment with them in Beijing as government liaison. During this year in Beijing before departing on his expedition, he met his wife, Eleanor Holgate. For their honeymoon they planned to travel from Beijing to India, he overland, she by rail across Siberia, a mammoth feat in the first half of the 20th century. In the event, the plans were disrupted and she had to travel alone by horse-drawn sled for 400 miles (640 km) in February to find him. She described her journey in Turkestan Reunion (1934), he in The Desert Road to Turkestan (1928) and High Tartary (1930). This trip laid the ground for his lifelong interest in all matters related to the Mongols and other peoples of the Silk Road.

Upon his return to America in 1928, he received a fellowship from the Social Science Research Council for further travel in Manchuria, then for the academic year 1928/1929 as a student at Harvard University. He did not, however, enroll in a doctoral program, but returned to China 1930–1933 with fellowships from the Harvard–Yenching Institute and the John Simon Guggenheim Memorial Foundation.

He was awarded the Patron's Medal by the British Royal Geographical Society in 1942 for his travels in Central Asia. In 1943, he was elected to the American Philosophical Society.

== Pacific Affairs and the Institute of Pacific Relations ==
In 1934, on the recommendation of treaty port journalist H.G.E. Woodhead, Lattimore was appointed editor of Pacific Affairs, published by the Institute of Pacific Relations, which he edited from Beijing. Rather than have bland official statements, he made it his policy to make the journal a "forum of controversy". As he later recalled, he was "continually in hot water, especially with the Japan Council, which thought I was too anti-imperialist, and the Soviet Council, which thought that its own anti-imperialist line was the only permissible one...." As explained below, others later accused him of motives which were less scholarly than political. Lattimore sought articles from a wide range of perspectives and made the journal a forum for new ideas, especially from the social sciences and social philosophy. Scholars and writers of all persuasions were contributors, including Pearl S. Buck, some Chinese literary figures, and dedicated Marxists.

IPR secretary Edward Carter was eager to solicit the participation of Soviet scholars, and insisted that Lattimore meet him in Moscow on his way back to the States. Lattimore had never been to the Soviet Union, having been denied a visa, and felt eager to obtain contributions from Soviet scholars, who had a distinguished tradition in Central Asian studies. But he was also wary because of the attacks Soviet scholars had made on him – Lattimore's "scholasticism is similar to Hamlet's madness" – and for publishing an article by Harold Isaacs, who they considered a Trotskyite. The Lattimores spent two weeks on the Trans-Siberian Railroad with their five-year-old son before arriving in Moscow for a two-week stay toward the end of March 1936. Soviet officials coldly demanded that the IPR and its journal support collective security arrangements against Japan. Lattimore responded that Pacific Affairs had the obligation to serve all the national councils, even the Japanese, and could not take political sides. Lattimore's request to visit the Mongolian People's Republic was denied on the grounds that "Mongolia now is constantly ready for war and conditions are very unstable." And in the end, Soviet scholars sent only one article to Pacific Affairs.

After sojourns in New York and London, the Lattimores returned to Beijing in 1937. Owen visited the Communist headquarters at Yan'an to act as translator for T. A. Bisson and Philip Jaffé, who were gathering material for Amerasia, an activist journal of political commentary. There he met Mao Zedong and Zhou Enlai. He was impressed with their candor, but had a less favorable experience on his visit to the party school for national minorities. When he spoke to the Mongols in Mongolian, his Chinese hosts broke off the session.

The Lattimores left China in 1938. Owen spent six months in Berkeley, California, writing a draft of the Inner Asian Frontiers of China and continuing as editor of Pacific Affairs. As editor, he then made what Robert Newman, a sympathetic biographer, called "the most serious error of his career." Lattimore published an article by a pro-Soviet writer, whom Lattimore did not know, praising Stalin's purge trials because they strengthened the Soviet Union for the coming battle against Germany and Japan. Lattimore famously stated that the show trials "sound to me like democracy". Lattimore's misjudgment of the purge trials was undoubtedly influenced by his generally favorable evaluation of Soviet foreign policy, which emphasized international cooperation against Japan and Germany and his judgment that the Soviets had been supportive of Mongol autonomy. He was "nonetheless wrong," Newman concluded.

He also soon wrote prominently against allowing Soviet expansion into China. As editor of Pacific Affairs he was expected to maintain a balance, but writing in another journal in the spring of 1940 he urged that "Above all, while we want to get Japan out of China, we do not want to let Russia in. Nor do we want to 'drive Japan into the arms of Russia.'" He continued: "the savagery of the Japanese assault is doing more to spread Communism than the teaching of the Chinese Communists themselves or the influences of Russia. It supplies the pressure under which the detonative ideas can work. At the same time it destroys Chinese wealth of every kind – capital, trade, revenue from agricultural rent – thus weakening that side of Chinese society which is most antagonistic to Communism."

The Middlesboro Daily News ran an article by Owen Lattimore which reported on Japan's planned offensive into a Hui Muslim region of China in 1938, which predicted that the Japanese would suffer a massive crushing defeat at the hands of the Muslims. In 1940, the Japanese were crushed and routed by the Muslims at the Battle of West Suiyuan. The Japanese planned to invade Ningxia from Suiyuan in 1939 and create a Hui Muslim puppet state. The following year in 1940, the Japanese were defeated militarily by the Kuomintang Muslim General Ma Hongbin, who caused the plan to collapse. Ma Hongbin's Hui Muslim troops launched further attacks against Japan in the Battle of West Suiyuan. In Suiyuan 300 Mongol collaborators serving the Japanese were fought off by a single Muslim who held the rank of Major at the Battle of Wulan Obo in 1939 April.

== World War II ==
Following the German invasion of the Soviet Union in June 1941, President Franklin D. Roosevelt appointed Lattimore to serve as US advisor to Chinese Nationalist leader Chiang Kai-shek for one and a half years. Lattimore advocated on behalf of the ethnic minorities in China, arguing that China should adopt a cultural autonomy policy based on the Soviet Union's minority policy, which he regarded as "one of the most successful Soviet policies." His advice was mostly disregarded by Chiang's officials, as defense secretary Wang Ch'ung-hui suspected Lattimore of understating Soviet interference in Xinjiang and Outer Mongolia.

In 1944, Lattimore was placed in charge of the Pacific area for the Office of War Information. By this time, Lattimore's political activities and associations had been under scrutiny for the last two years by the FBI, which recommended Lattimore be put under "Custodial Detention in case of National Emergency".

At President Roosevelt's request, he accompanied U.S. Vice-president Henry A. Wallace on a mission to Siberia, China, and Mongolia in 1944 for the U.S. Office of War Information. The trip had been arranged by Lauchlin Currie, who recommended to FDR that Lattimore accompany Wallace. During this visit, which overlapped the D-Day landings, Wallace and his delegates stayed 25 days in Siberia and were given a tour of the Soviet Union's Magadan Gulag camp at Kolyma. In a travelogue for National Geographic, Lattimore described what little he saw as a combination of the Hudson's Bay Company and the Tennessee Valley Authority, remarking on how strong and well-fed the inmates were and ascribing to camp commandant Ivan Nikishov "a trained and sensitive interest in art and music and also a deep sense of civic responsibility". In a letter written to the New Statesman in 1968, Lattimore justified himself by arguing his role had not been one to "snoop on his hosts." (In contrast, camp commander Naftaly Frenkel explained: "We have to squeeze everything out of a prisoner in the first three months – after that we don't need him anymore." The system of hard labor and minimal or no food reduced most prisoners to helpless "goners" (dokhodyaga, in Russian). Conditions varied depending on the state of the country.)

During the 1940s, Lattimore came into increasing conflict with another member of the IPR's board, Alfred Kohlberg, a manufacturer with long experience in the China trade whose visit to China in 1943 convinced him that stories of Chiang Kai-shek's corruption were false. He accused Lattimore of being hostile to Chiang and too sympathetic towards the Chinese Communist Party.

In 1944, relations between Kohlberg and Lattimore became so bad that Kohlberg left the IPR and founded a new journal, Plain Talk, in which he attempted to rebut the claims made in Pacific Affairs. By the late 1940s, Lattimore had become a particular target of Kohlberg and other members of the China Lobby. Kohlberg was later to become an advisor to Senator Joseph McCarthy, and it is possible that McCarthy first learned of Lattimore's communist tendencies through Kohlberg.

== Accused of espionage ==
Meanwhile, accusations were made, which later became public. On 14 December 1948, Alexander Barmine, former chargé d'affaires at the Soviet Embassy in Athens, Greece, advised Federal Bureau of Investigation agents that Soviet GRU Director Yan Karlovich Berzin had informed him prior to Barmine's 1937 defection that Lattimore was a Soviet agent, an allegation Barmine would repeat under oath before the Senate McCarran Committee in 1951.

== Congressional investigation ==
In March 1950, in executive session of the Tydings Committee, Senator Joseph McCarthy accused Lattimore of being the top Soviet agent, either in the US, in the State Department, or both. The committee, chaired by Senator Millard Tydings, was investigating McCarthy's claims of widespread Soviet infiltration of the State Department. When the accusation was leaked to the press, McCarthy backed off from the charge that Lattimore was a spy but continued the attack in public session of the committee and in speeches.

Lattimore, he said, "in view of his position of tremendous power at the State Department" was the "'architect' of our Far Eastern policy" and asked whether Lattimore's "aims are American aims or whether they coincide with the aims of Soviet Russia." At the time, Lattimore was in Kabul, Afghanistan, on a cultural mission for the United Nations. Lattimore dismissed the charges against him as "moonshine" and hurried back to the United States to testify before the Tydings Committee.

McCarthy, who had no evidence of specific acts of espionage and only weak evidence that Lattimore was a concealed Communist, in April 1950 persuaded Louis F. Budenz, the now-anticommunist former editor of the Communist Party organ Daily Worker, to testify. Budenz had no first-hand knowledge of Lattimore's Communist allegiance and had never previously identified him as a Communist in his extensive FBI interviews. In addition, Budenz had in 1947 told a State Department investigator that he "did not recall any instances" that suggested that Lattimore was a Communist and had also told his editor at Collier's magazine in 1949 that Lattimore had never "acted as a Communist in any way."

Now, however, Budenz testified that Lattimore was a secret Communist but not a Soviet agent; he was a person of influence who often assisted Soviet foreign policy. Budenz said his party superiors had told him that Lattimore's "great value lay in the fact that he could bring the emphasis in support of Soviet policy in non-Soviet language." The majority report of the Tydings committee cleared Lattimore of all charges against him; the minority report accepted Budenz's charges.

In February 1952, Lattimore was called to testify before the Senate Internal Security Subcommittee (SISS), headed by McCarthy's ally, Senator Pat McCarran. Before Lattimore was called as witness, investigators for the SISS had seized all of the records of the Institute of Pacific Relations (IPR). The twelve days of testimony were marked by shouting matches, which pitted McCarran and McCarthy on one side against Lattimore on the other. Lattimore took three days to deliver his opening statement: the delays were caused by frequent interruptions as McCarran challenged Lattimore point by point. McCarran then used the records from the IPR to ask questions that often taxed Lattimore's memory. Budenz again testified, but this time claimed that Lattimore was both a Communist and a Soviet agent.

The subcommittee also summoned scholars. Nicholas Poppe, a Russian émigré and a scholar of Mongolia and Tibet, resisted the committee's invitation to label Lattimore a Communist but found some of his writings superficial and uncritical. The most damaging testimony came from Karl August Wittfogel, supported by his colleague from the University of Washington, George Taylor. Wittfogel, a former Communist, said that at the time Lattimore edited the journal Pacific Affairs, Lattimore knew of his Communist background; even though they had not exchanged words on the matter, Lattimore had given Wittfogel a "knowing smile."

Lattimore acknowledged that Wittfogel's thought had been tremendously influential but said that if there had been a smile, it was a "non-Communist smile". Wittfogel and Taylor charged that Lattimore had done "great harm to the free world" in disregarding the need to defeat world Communism as a first priority. John K. Fairbank, in his memoirs, suggests that Wittfogel may have said this because he had been made to leave Germany for having views unacceptable to the powers that be, and he did not want to make the same mistake twice. They also asserted that the influence of Marxism on Lattimore was shown by his use of the word "feudal." Lattimore replied that he did not think that Marxists had a "patent" on that word.

In 1952, after 17 months of study and hearing, involving 66 witnesses and thousands of documents, the McCarran Committee issued its 226-page, unanimous final report. This report stated that "Owen Lattimore was, from some time beginning in the 1930s, a conscious articulate instrument of the Soviet conspiracy," and that on "at least five separate matters," Lattimore had not told the whole truth. One example: "The evidence... shows conclusively that Lattimore knew Frederick V. Field to be a Communist; that he collaborated with Field after he possessed this knowledge; and that he did not tell the truth before the subcommittee about this association with Field...."

On December 16, 1952, Lattimore was indicted for perjury on seven counts. Six of the counts related to various discrepancies between Lattimore's testimony and the IPR records; the seventh accused Lattimore of seeking to deliberately deceive the SISS. Lattimore's defenders, such as his lawyer Abe Fortas, claimed that the discrepancies were caused by McCarran deliberately asking questions about arcane and obscure matters that took place in the 1930s.

Within three years, federal judge Luther Youngdahl dismissed the perjury charges on technical grounds.

Four of the charges were dismissed as insubstantial and not judicable; denying that he was sympathetic to communism was too vague to be fairly answered; and the other counts were matters of little concern, those for which a jury would be unlikely to convict on matters of political judgment. In his book Ordeal by Slander, Lattimore gives his own account of these events up until 1950.

In his 1979 memoir, former FBI agent William C. Sullivan said that, despite Hoover's relentless efforts, the FBI never found "anything substantial" and that the accusations against Lattimore were "ridiculous."

== Legacy ==
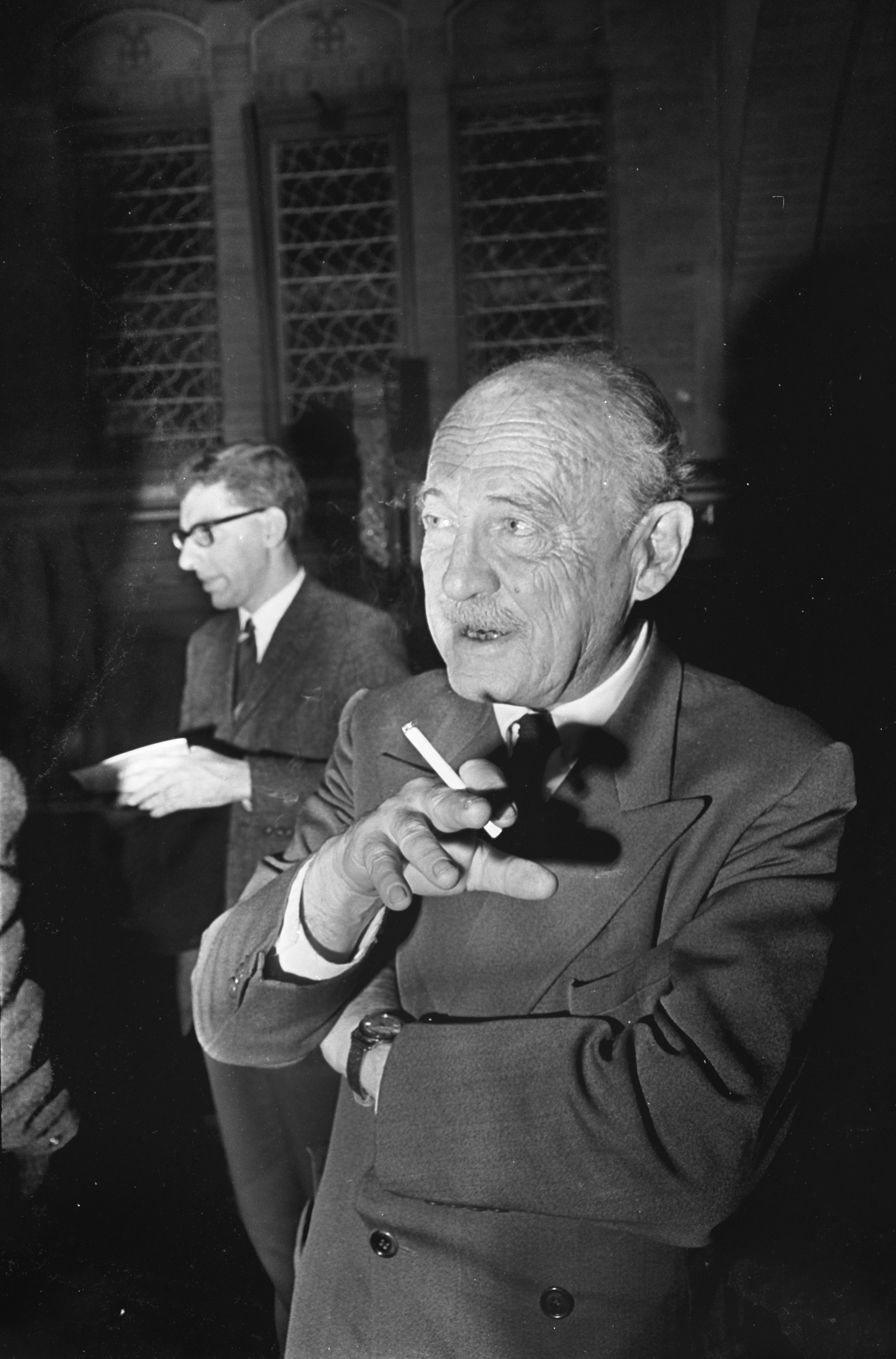
Lattimore (Amsterdam, 1967)

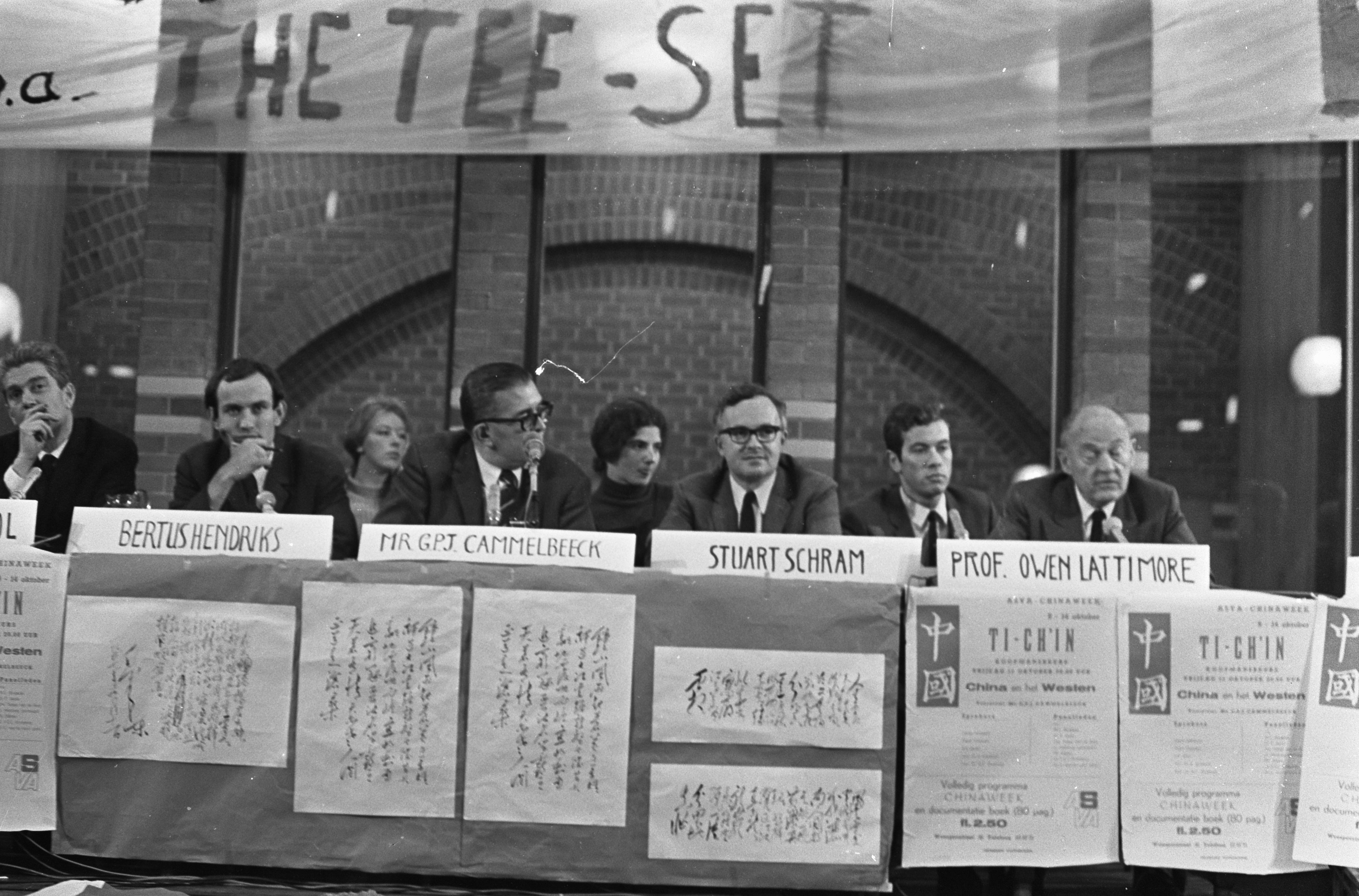
Ti-Ch'in in Amsterdam (the Netherlands), 1967. (Teach-in on China). Left to right: K.S. Karol (=Karol Kewes), Bertus Hendriks, George Cammelbeeck, Stuart Schram & Owen Lattimore

From 1938 to 1953, Lattimore was the director of the Page School of International Relations at the Johns Hopkins University. After the disbanding of the Page School, he was given a faculty appointment in the history department and continued to teach there until 1963, when he was recruited by the University of Leeds to establish its Department of Chinese Studies (now East Asian Studies). In addition to setting up Chinese Studies, he promoted Mongolian Studies, building good relations between Leeds and Mongolia and establishing a programme in Mongolian Studies in 1968. He remained at Leeds until he retired as Emeritus Professor in 1970.

In 1984 the University of Leeds conferred the degree of Doctor of Letters (DLitt) on emeritus Professor Lattimore honoris causa.

Lattimore had a lifelong dedication to establishing research centres to further the study of Mongolian history and culture. In 1979 he became the first Westerner to be awarded the Order of the Polar Star, the highest award that the Mongolian state gives to foreigners. The State Museum in Ulaanbaatar named a newly discovered dinosaur after him in 1986.

The American Centre for Mongolian Studies, together with the International Association of Mongolian Studies and the National University of Mongolia School of Foreign Service, organized a conference entitled "Owen Lattimore: The Past, Present, and Future of Inner Asian Studies" in Ulaanbaatar, Mongolia, on August 20 and 21, 2008.

Prominent figures in the anti-Communist American political left offered mixed evaluations of Lattimore's legacy in foreign policy. Arthur Schlesinger, Jr. thought that while Lattimore was not a Soviet spy, he may have been a fellow traveler who was deeply committed to communist ideals, and Sidney Hook similarly proclaimed Latimore "a devious and skillful follower of the Communist Party line on Asian affairs”.

=== Theory ===
Historian Peter Perdue wrote that "Modern historians, anthropologists, and archaeologists have revised many of Lattimore's arguments, but they still rely on his insights. All of the themes addressed by Lattimore continue to inspire world historians today."

In An Inner Asian Approach to the Historical Geography of China (1947), Lattimore explored the system through which humanity affects the environment and is changed by it, and concluded that civilization is molded by its own impact on the environment. He lists the following pattern:

1. A primitive society pursues some agricultural activities, but is aware that it has many limitations.
2. Growing and evolving, the society begins to change the environment. For example, depleting its game supply and wild crops, it begins to domesticate animals and plants. It deforests land to create room for these activities.
3. The environment changes, offering new opportunities. For example, it becomes grasslands.
4. Society changes in response, and reacts to the new opportunities as a new society. For example, the once-nomads build permanent settlements and shift from a hunter-gatherer mentality to a farming society culture.
5. The reciprocal process continues, offering new variations.

== Publications ==
- 1928: The Desert Road to Turkestan. London: Methuen. ISBN 0404038875.
  - 1929 (reprint): Boston: Little Brown; 1972 (reprint with new introduction): New York: AMS Press; 1995 (reprint): New York: Kodansha International.
- 1930: High Tartary. Boston: Little Brown.
  - 1994 (reprint): New York: Kodansha International.
- 1932: Manchuria: Cradle of Conflict. New York: Macmillan. Revised in 1935.
- 1933: The Gold tribe, "Fishskin Tatars" of the lower Sungari. Menasha, WI: American Anthropological Association ISBN 9781258092924
- 1933: "The Unknown Frontier of Manchuria." Foreign Affairs, vol. 11, no. 2 (January 1933).
- 1934: The Mongols of Manchuria: Their Tribal Divisions, Geographical Distribution, Historical Relations With Manchus and Chinese, and Present Political Problems. New York: John Day (with maps).
  - 1969 (reprint): New York: H. Fertig.
- 1934: "China and the Barbarians." In: Joseph Barnes, ed. Empire in the East. New York: Doubleday, pp. 3–36. ISBN 978-0836918632
  - 1970 (reprint). ISBN 0836918630.
- 1935: "On the Wickedness of Being Nomads." T'ien Hsia Monthly, vol. 1, no. 1 (August 1935), pp. 47–62.
- 1940: Inner Asian Frontiers of China. International Research Series. New York: American Geographical Society, in conjunction with the Secretariat of the Institute of Pacific Relations.
  - 1967 (reprint): Boston: Beacon Press.
- 1941: Mongol Journeys. New York: Doubleday Doran.
- 1941: "Stalemate in China." Foreign Affairs, vol. 19, no. 3 (April 1941).
- 1942: "The Fight for Democracy in Asia." Foreign Affairs, vol. 20, no. 4 (July 1942).
- 1942: "China Opens Her Wild West." Washington, D.C.: National Geographic Society, Vol. 182, No. 3, September 1942.
- 1943: America and Asia: Problems of Today's War and the Peace of Tomorrow. Claremont, Calif.: Claremont Colleges. Foreword by Admiral Harry E. Yarnell.
- 1944: The Making of Modern China: A Short History, with Eleanor Holgate Lattimore. New York: W. W. Norton.
  - 1944 (reprint): Washington, D.C.: Infantry Journal.
- 1945: Solution in Asia. Boston: Little Brown. ISBN 978-0404106355.
- 1947: "An Inner Asian Approach to the Historical Geography of China." Geographical Journal (UK), vol. 110, no. 4/6 (Oct./Dec. 1947), pp. 180–187. JSTOR 1789948.
- 1947: China: A Short History, with Eleanor Holgate Lattimore. New York: W. W. Norton. Revised edition.
- 1949: The Situation in Asia. Boston: Little Brown.
- 1950: Pivot of Asia: Sinkiang and the Inner Asian Frontiers of China and Russia. Boston: Little Brown.
- 1950: Ordeal by Slander. Boston: Little Brown. OCLC 466941.
  - 2004 (reprint): New York: Carroll & Graf. Introduction by Blanche Wiessen Cook. Preface by David Lattimore.
- 1953: "The New Political Geography of Inner Asia." Great Britain: Geographical Journal, vol. CXIX, no. 1 (March 1953).
  - Reprint: London: William Clowes and Sons.
- 1955: Nationalism and Revolution in Mongolia, with Sh. Nachukdorgi. New York: Oxford University Press.
- 1962: Nomads and Commissars: Mongolia Revisited. New York: Oxford University Press. ISBN 978-1258191566.
- 1962: Studies in Frontier History: Collected Papers, 1928–1958. London: Oxford University Press; Paris: Mouton.
- 1964: From China, Looking Outward: An Inaugural Lecture. Leeds: Leeds University Press.
- 1968: Silks, Spices, and Empire: Asia Seen Through the Eyes of Its Discoverers, ed. with Eleanor Holgate Lattimore. New York: Delacorte.
  - 1973 (reprint): London: Universal-Tandem
- 1970: History and Revolution in China. Lund: Studentlitteratur.
- 1982: The Diluv Khutagt: Memoirs and Autobiography of a Mongol Buddhist Reincarnation in Religion and Revolution. Wiesbaden: O. Harrassowitz. ISBN 3447022213.
- 1990: China Memoirs: Chiang Kai-shek and the War Against Japan. Compiled by Fujiko Isono. Tokyo: University of Tokyo Press. ISBN 978-0860084686.
  - Japanese translation available. ISBN 978-7309016024.

== References and further reading ==
- Buck, David (1999). "Owen Lattimore". In Garraty, John A.; Carnes, Mark C. (eds.). American National Biography. New York: Oxford University Press. pp. 248–250. OCLC 39182280.
- Cotton, James (1989). Asian Frontier Nationalism: Owen Lattimore and the American Policy Debate. Atlantic Highlands, NJ: Humanities Press International. ISBN 0391036513.
- Evans, M. Stanton (2007). "Chapter 29: Owen Lattimore". Blacklisted by History: The Untold Story of Senator Joe McCarthy and His Fight against America's Enemies. New York: Crown Forum. ISBN 978-1400081059.
- Flynn, John Thomas (1953). The Lattimore Story. New York: Devin-Adair Publishing Company. Also available at HathiTrust.
- Fried, Richard (1990). Nightmare in Red: The McCarthy Era in Perspective. New York & Toronto: Oxford University Press. ISBN 019504360X.
- Klingaman, William (1996). Encyclopedia of the McCarthy Era. New York: Facts on File. ISBN 0816030979.
- Loubere, Nicholas (January 8, 2016). "Inside Out: Owen Lattimore on China". The China Story. Australia: Australian Centere on China in the World.
- Newman, Robert P. (1992). Owen Lattimore and the "Loss" of China. California: University of California Press. ISBN 978-0520073883. Full text online.
- Oshinsky, David (1983). A Conspiracy So Immense: The World of Joe McCarthy. New York: Free Press; London: Collier Macmillan. ISBN 0029234905.
- Rowe, William T. (2007). "Owen Lattimore, Asia, and Comparative History". Journal of Asian Studies. 66 (3). Ann Arbor, MI: Association for Asian Studies: 759–786. doi:10.1017/S0021911807000952. S2CID 163037081.
- Schrecker, Ellen (1986). No Ivory Tower: McCarthyism and the Universities. New York: Oxford University Press. ISBN 0195035577.
- Schrecker, Ellen (1998). Many Are the Crimes: McCarthyism in America. Boston & London: Little, Brown. ISBN 0316774707.
