= UBC Department of Asian Studies =

Department of Asian Studies
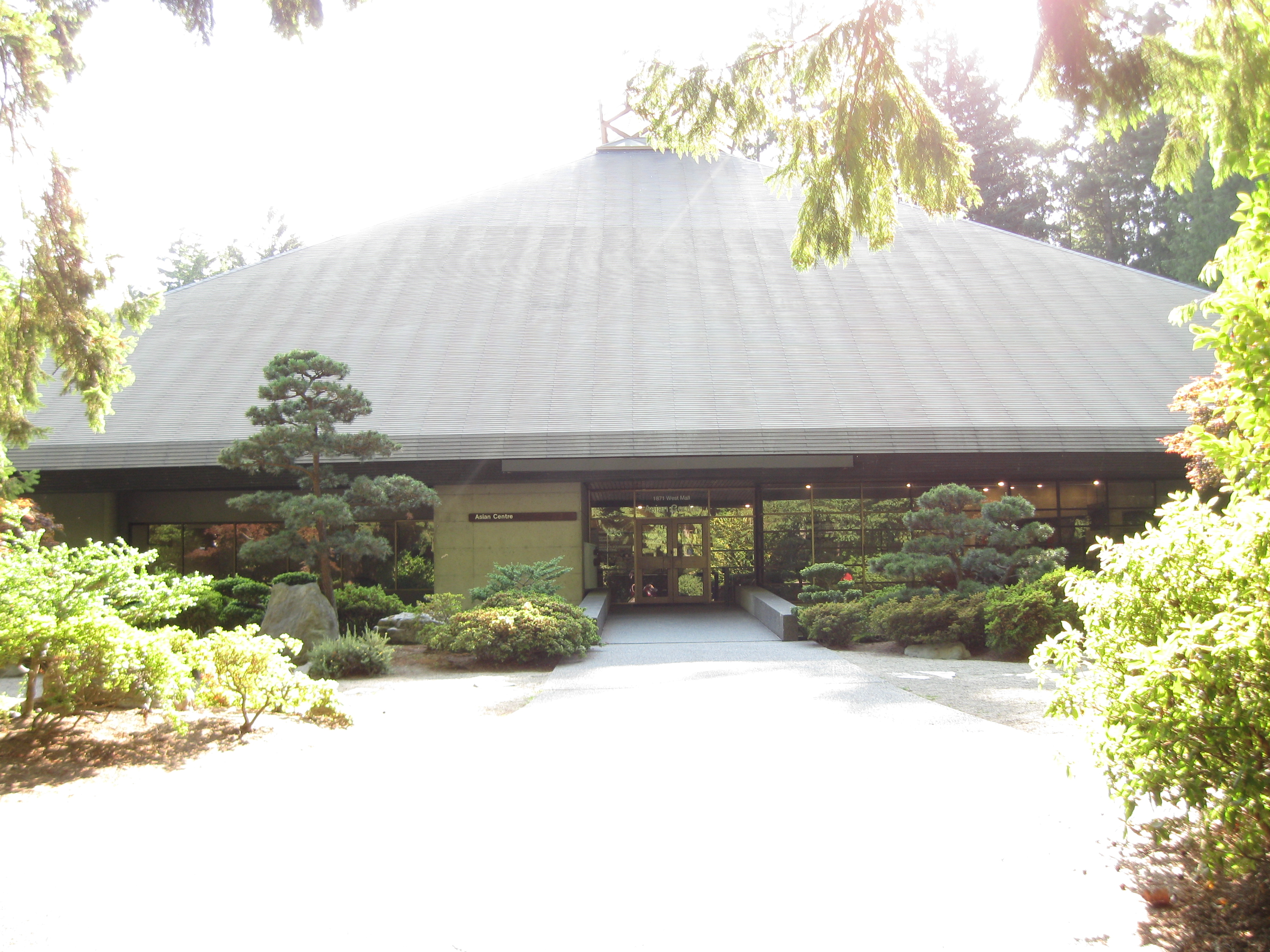
- The Asian Centre
- Established: 1961
- Parent institution: University of British Columbia
- Head: Ross King
- Location: Vancouver, British Columbia, Canada
- Campus: Vancouver
- Website: www.ubc.asia.ca

The UBC Department of Asian Studies at the University of British Columbia was established in 1961 and is one of the top Asian Studies departments in North America. The department's faculty and staff offices are located in the Asian Centre of the Vancouver campus.

== History ==
=== Building ===
The Asian Centre building that houses the department consists of the roof and structural framework of the Sanyo Pavilion constructed for the 1970 World Exposition in Osaka, Japan.

=== About the logo ===
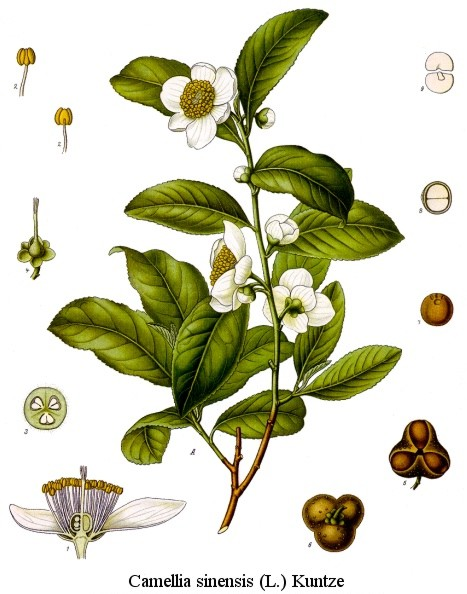
Camellia sinensis

The UBC Department of Asian Studies logo is often mistaken to be a lotus flower, with its symbolization of purity, non-attachment and enlightenment in Buddhist tradition. The design (courtesy of Asian Studies MA student in Japanese Literature and Visual Culture and graphic designer Julien Butterlin) does indeed gesture in this direction, but the flower depicted is in fact that of Camellia sinensis or Thea sinensis, the tea plant whence many teas are derived. A genus of flowering plants in the family Theaceae, Camellia sinensis is used to harvest white tea, green tea, oolong, pu-erh tea and black tea.

Tea is the second-most widely consumed beverage in the world after water, and has played and continues to play such a central role in all Asian cultures that it was a natural choice to symbolize the diverse Asian languages, literature, cultures, histories, and religions represented in the Department of Asian Studies.

== Degrees Programs ==
=== Undergraduate ===
Majors require 48 credits and minors require 30 credits of coursework within the department.

- Major and minor in Asian Area Studies
- Major and minor in Asian Language and Culture
  - The major includes a specialization in China, Chinese Literature, Japan, Korea, or South Asia.
- Honours Program in Asian Studies

=== Graduate ===
- Master of Arts in Asian Studies
- Doctor of Philosophy in Asian Studies

== Course Offerings ==
The Department of Asian Studies offers two categories of undergraduate courses. The first category features courses on the contemporary and historical culture of South, Southeast, and East Asia, and do not require knowledge of an Asian language. The second category features courses in various Asian languages from an introductory to advanced level, with the latter covering literary, philosophical and historical works in their original language.

The department also offers graduate courses falling under the categories of Asia, China, Japan, Korea, South Asia, and Theories, Methods & Pan-Regional.

=== Languages ===
- Chinese - largest program in North America with over 2,000 annual enrollments offering courses in Mandarin for heritage and non-heritage learners, as well as Cantonese speakers. Courses in Cantonese slated to be available beginning in 2015.
- Hindi
- Indonesian
- Japanese - largest program of its kind in mainland North America with over 2,000 yearly enrollments.
- Korean
- Persian
- Punjabi
- Sanskrit

== Faculty ==
- Bruce Fulton, Associate Professor in Korean Literature and Literary Translation

== Former Faculty ==
- William L. Holland
- Edwin G. Pulleyblank

== See also ==
- Institute of Asian Research
- Peter Wall Institute for Advanced Studies
- Canadian Institute for Advanced Research
