= Pacific Affairs =

Academic journal devoted to modern Asia

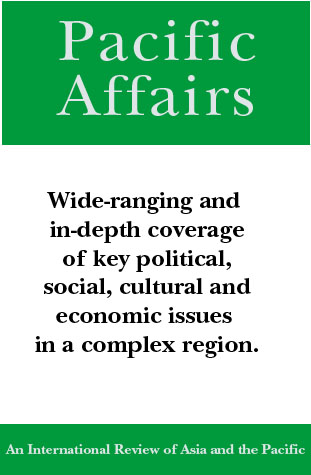
- Discipline: Area studies, Asian studies, Pacific studies
- Language: English
- Edited by: Soo Yeon Kim

Publication details
- History: 1928–present
- Publisher: Routledge on behalf of the University of British Columbia (Canada)
- Frequency: Quarterly
- Impact factor: 1.4 (2023)

Standard abbreviations
- ISO 4: Pac. Aff.

Indexing
- ISSN: 0030-851X (print); 1715-3379 (web)
- JSTOR: pacificaffairs
- OCLC no.: 851140338

Links
- Journal homepage; Official archive

Pacific Affairs: An International Review of Asia and the Pacific, commonly known as Pacific Affairs (PA), is a Canadian peer-reviewed scholarly journal that publishes academic research on contemporary political, economic, and social issues in Asia and the Pacific.

== History ==
The journal was founded in 1926 as the newsletter for the entirety of the Institute of Pacific Relations (IPR). In May 1928, PA adopted its current name, and has been published continuously since. From 1934 to 1942, the journal was edited by Owen Lattimore, then William L. Holland.

Pressure from Senator Joseph McCarthy led to the dissolution of the IPR in 1960. The journal moved from the IPR headquarters in New York to the University of British Columbia in Vancouver, Canada, in 1961. It is currently housed in the Institute of Asian Research at the University of British Columbia.

The journal's executive committee is composed of an editor, associate editors (based on the following geographic regions: Asia General, China and Inner Asia, Japan, Korea, South Asia, Southeast Asia, and Australasia and the Pacific Islands) and members representing Simon Fraser University, and the University of Northern British Columbia.

Ingenta was the electronic provider for Pacific Affairs's online subscriptions. Subscribers also have access to the entire contents of the journal from its inception in 1926 in JSTOR with a four-year moving wall. Since 2026, Pacific Affairs has been published by Routledge in behalf of the University of British Columbia.

== Content ==
In addition to scholarly articles based on original research, the journal publishes "perspectives," which are shorter articles, and often groups articles with a common theme into special issues. Some recent themes include renegotiating social risks in China and Japan, seeking agency for change in a hypermobile world, and ocean claims in the South Pacific.

PA publishes 35–45 book reviews in each issue as well as the occasional documentary film review, under the headings of Asia General; China and Inner Asia; Northeast Asia (Japan, Korea, Russian Far East); South Asia; Southeast Asia; and Australasia and the Pacific Region. Books from social sciences and humanities disciplines are reviewed by reviewers who are invited by PA's executive committee. PA also publishes review articles which are also invited by the executive committee members. A review article is more in-depth, longer and compares the conclusions of several different authors on a single topic. The journal does not accept unsolicited book reviews.

In terms of chronological coverage, books that deal with topics before the 1900s are not reviewed unless there are explicit thematic or analytical links to contemporary affairs and/or theory.

== Further readings ==
- Hooper, Paul F. (ed) Remembering the Institute of Pacific Relations: The Memoirs of William L. Holland. Tokyo: Ryukei Shyosha, 1995. Also available at the University of British Columbia Library.
