= Afro-Asia =

Combination of Africa and Asia

World map depicting Afrasia (Africa & Asia).

Afro-Asia (or Afrasia) is a term describing the combination of Africa and Asia. The term is often used to describe the solidarity between African and Asian nations when they were acting against European colonialism and later also remaining nonaligned during the Cold War.

Together with Europe, Africa and Asia form the landmass of Afro-Eurasia.

== History ==
=== Ancient era ===
Africa and Asia had trade links in pre-colonial times, particularly through East Africa trading with Asian regions as far east as China (see also Ming treasure voyages).

=== Modern era ===
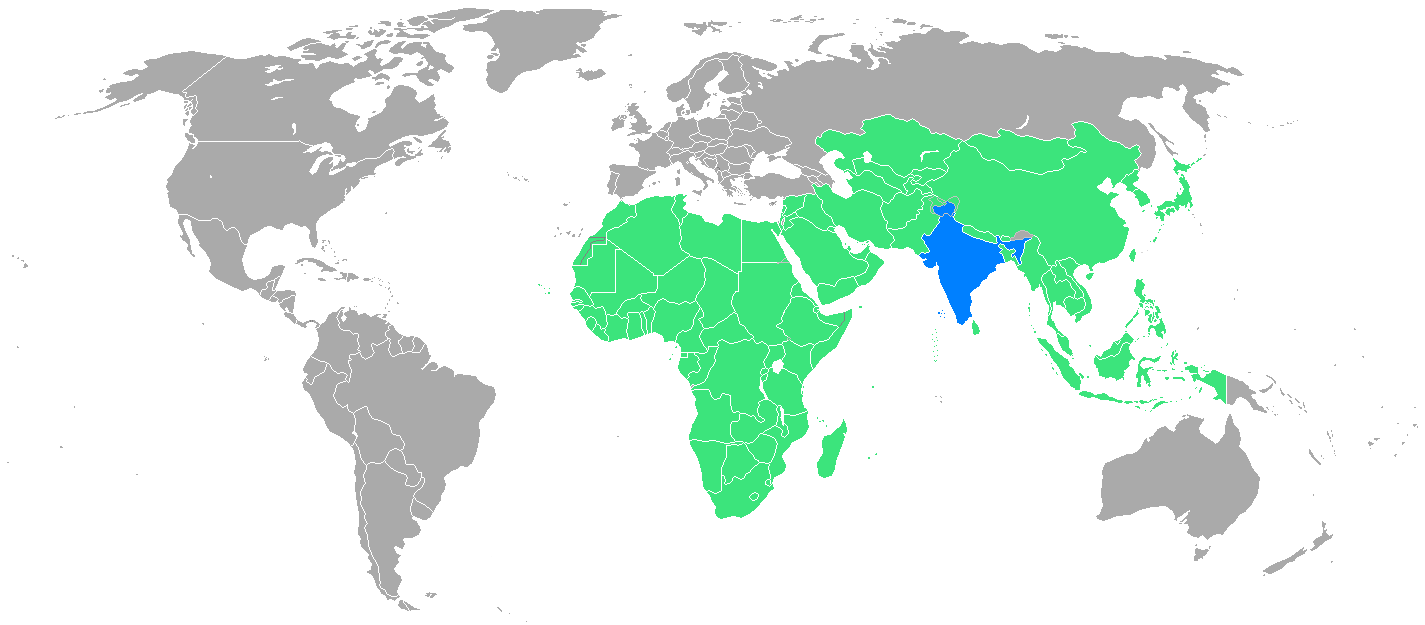
A map depicting the countries that participated in the 2003 Afro-Asian Games.

The 1869 completion of the Suez Canal gave European powers greater access to Asia and the east coast of Africa, as they could now sail directly through the Indo-Mediterranean rather than around South Africa. This led into the New Imperialism that dominated much of Afro-Asia at the turn of the 20th century. Modern Afro-Asian solidarity began in reaction to Western colonialism and the positioning of whiteness as superior. For example, Japan's rising ability to contest Western dominance in the Asia-Pacific in the early 20th century encouraged black nationalists in America to envision a rising Afro-Asian world order that could overthrow white dominance (see also Yellow Peril). Collaboration also occurred due to (sometimes forced) migration within and beyond Afro-Asia; the efforts of the Afro-Asian diaspora (i.e. the combined African diaspora and Asian diaspora) played a role in creating pressure toward justice, with labourers such as the coolies forced to band together to face oppression.

The major postcolonial impetus for Afro-Asian solidarity was the 1955 Bandung Conference. This solidarity was sometimes frustrating for the West when votes were taken at the United Nations. However, the solidarity declined due to the 1962 Sino-Indian War, weakening the relationship between the two Asian giants; the division of the African nations into groups such as the Monrovia Group and Casablanca Group, as well as the Sino-Soviet split were other major issues that further split Afro-Asia into competing blocs in the 1960s.

== See also ==
- Afro-Asian Conference
- Afro-Asian Peoples' Solidarity Conference, 1957
- Afro-Asian People's Solidarity Organisation
- Afro-Asians
- Africa–India relations
- Black orientalism
- Football at the Afro-Asian Games
- Sino-African relations
- South–South cooperation
  - Africa–South America Summit
  - India–Latin America relations
  - Sino-Latin America relations
- Soviet Afro-Asian Solidarity Committee
