= Afro-Asiatic (disambiguation) =

Afro-Asiatic may refer to:

- Afro-Asiatic languages
- Proto-Afro-Asiatic language, the reconstructed common ancestor of all Afro-Asiatic languages
- Relating to Afro-Asia
- An older name for Afro-Asian, mixed race people of African and Asian (particularly sub-Saharan African and East/Southeast Asian) descent

== See also ==
- Indo-African (disambiguation)
