= Bandung Conference =

1955 meeting of Asian and African states

Asian–African Conference Konferensi Asia–Afrika
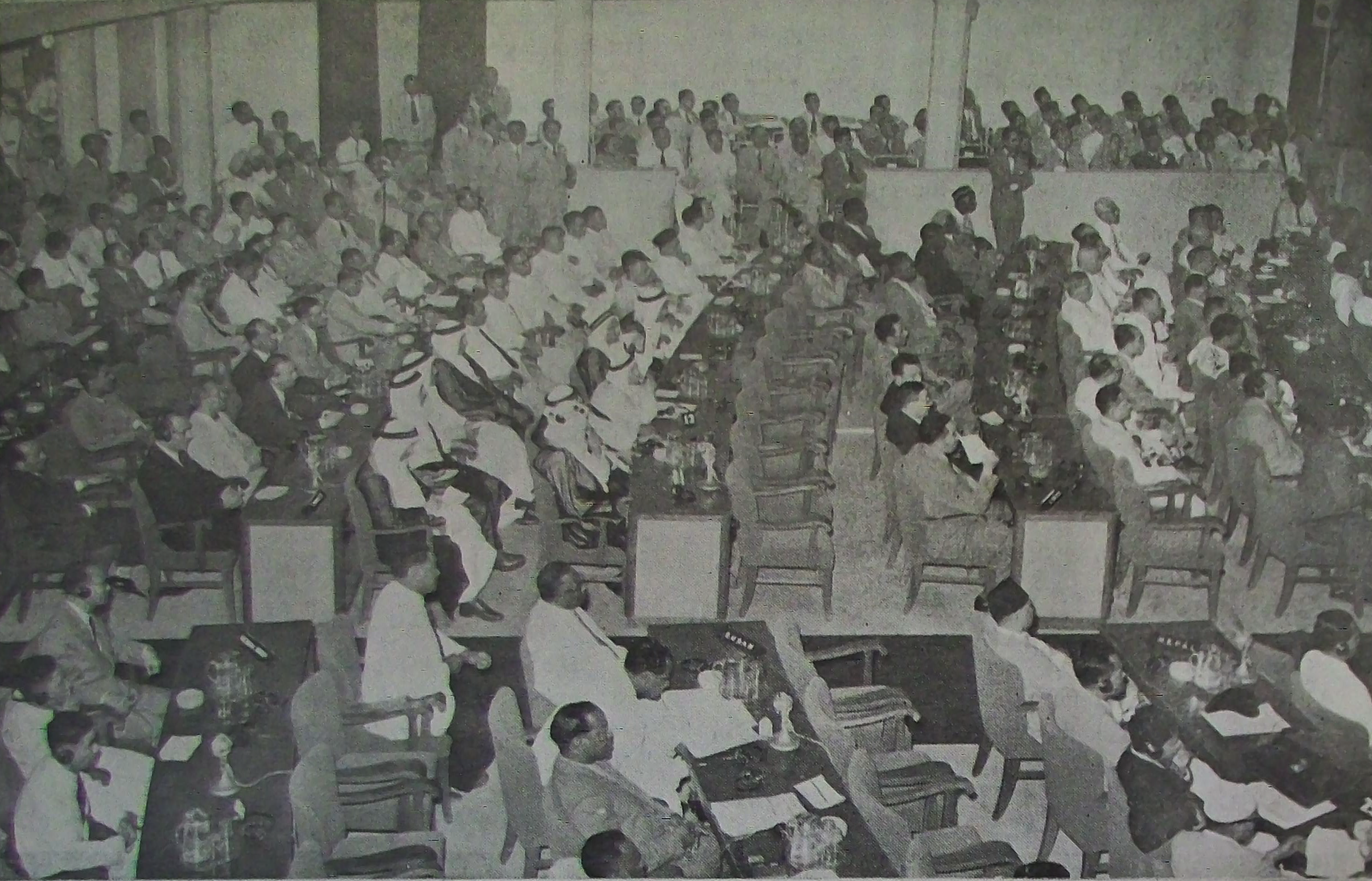
- Plenary session during the Bandung Conference
- Host country: Indonesia
- Dates: 18 to 24 April 1955
- Cities: Bandung
- Participants: 304 representatives
- Chair: Ruslan Abdulgani; Foreign Minister of Indonesia

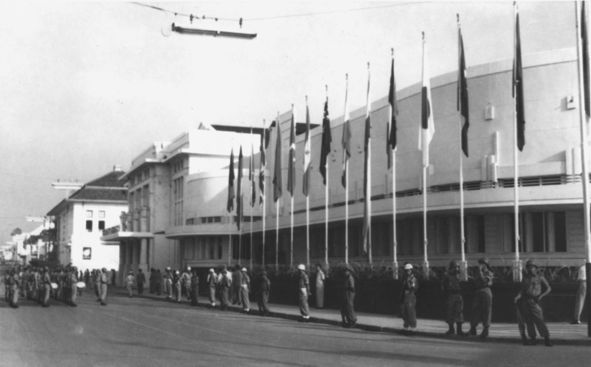
Merdeka Building, the main venue in 1955

The first large-scale Asian–African or Afro–Asian Conference (Indonesian: Konferensi Asia–Afrika), also known as the Bandung Conference, was a meeting of Asian and African states, most of which were newly independent, which took place on 18–24 April 1955 in Bandung, West Java, Indonesia. The twenty-nine countries that participated represented a total population of 1.5 billion people, 54% of the world's population. The conference was organized by Indonesia, Burma (Myanmar), India, Ceylon (Sri Lanka), and Pakistan and was coordinated by Ruslan Abdulgani, secretary general of the Ministry of Foreign Affairs of the Republic of Indonesia.

The conference's stated aims were to promote Afro-Asian economic and cultural cooperation and to oppose colonialism or neocolonialism by any nation. The conference was a step towards the eventual creation of the Non-Aligned Movement (NAM) yet the two initiatives ran in parallel during the 1960s, even coming in confrontation with one another prior to the 2nd Cairo NAM Conference in 1964.

In 2005, on the 50th anniversary of the original conference, leaders from Asian and African countries met in Jakarta and Bandung to launch the New Asian–African Strategic Partnership (NAASP). They pledged to promote political, economic, and cultural cooperation between the two continents.

== Background ==
Indonesian President Sukarno and Indian Prime Minister Jawaharlal Nehru were key organizers in their quest to build a nonaligned movement that would win the support of the newly emerging nations of Asia and Africa. Nehru first got the idea at the Asian Relations Conference, held in India in March 1947, on the eve of India's independence. There was a second 19-nation conference regarding the status of Indonesia, held in New Delhi, India, in January 1949. Although Nehru initially attached relatively little importance to Indonesia's calls to convene the Bandung Conference, he showed increasing interest during and after late 1954 due to his concern about American foreign policy as it applied to Asia, his belief that he could secure a guarantee of peaceful coexistence with China, and his desire to avoid embarrassing Indonesia. Decolonization was underway and an increasing number of new nations in Africa or Asia were emerging with, for the first time, their own diplomatic corps and need to integrate into the international system.

Chairman Mao Zedong of the Chinese Communist Party was also a key organizer, backed by his influential right-hand man, Premier and Foreign Minister Zhou Enlai. Mao believed that an anti-colonial nationalist and anti-imperialist agenda was underway in Africa and Asia, and he wanted to make China the leader of these forces. In his efforts to present China as a model, Mao publicly maintained a friendly, conciliatory tone towards newly independent Asian nations, while simultaneously denouncing the Western colonial empires.

At the Colombo Powers conference in April 1954, Indonesia proposed a global conference. A planning group with the leaders of Indonesia, India, Pakistan, Burma, and Ceylon met in Bogor, West Java in late December 1954 and formally decided to hold the conference in April 1955. They had a series of goals in mind: to promote goodwill and cooperation among the new nations, to advance their mutual interests, to examine social economic and cultural problems, to focus on problems of special interest to their peoples such as racism and colonialism, and to enhance the international visibility of Asia and Africa in world affairs. As many of the participating countries were countries the USA and Soviet Union wanted to influence, they sought to establish a unified non-aligned identity and promote political solidarity independent of both Western and Soviet influence.

The Bandung Conference reflected what the organizers regarded as a reluctance by the Western powers to consult with them on decisions affecting Asia in a setting of Cold War tensions: their concern over tension between the People's Republic of China and the United States, their desire to lay firmer foundations for China's peace relations with themselves and the West, their opposition to colonialism (especially France's neocolonialism in North Africa and its colonial rule in Algeria), and Indonesia's desire to promote its case in the West New Guinea dispute with the Netherlands. One of Sukarno's primary goals with the conference was to build support for Indonesia's claim to West Papua and to prevent the Netherlands from transferring sovereignty of West Papua to indigenous Papuans.

Sukarno portrayed himself as the leader of this group of states, which he later described as "NEFOS" (Newly Emerging Forces).

On 4 December 1954, the United Nations announced that Indonesia had successfully placed the issue of West New Guinea on the agenda of the 1955 General Assembly. Plans for the Bandung conference were announced in December 1954.

== Discussion ==
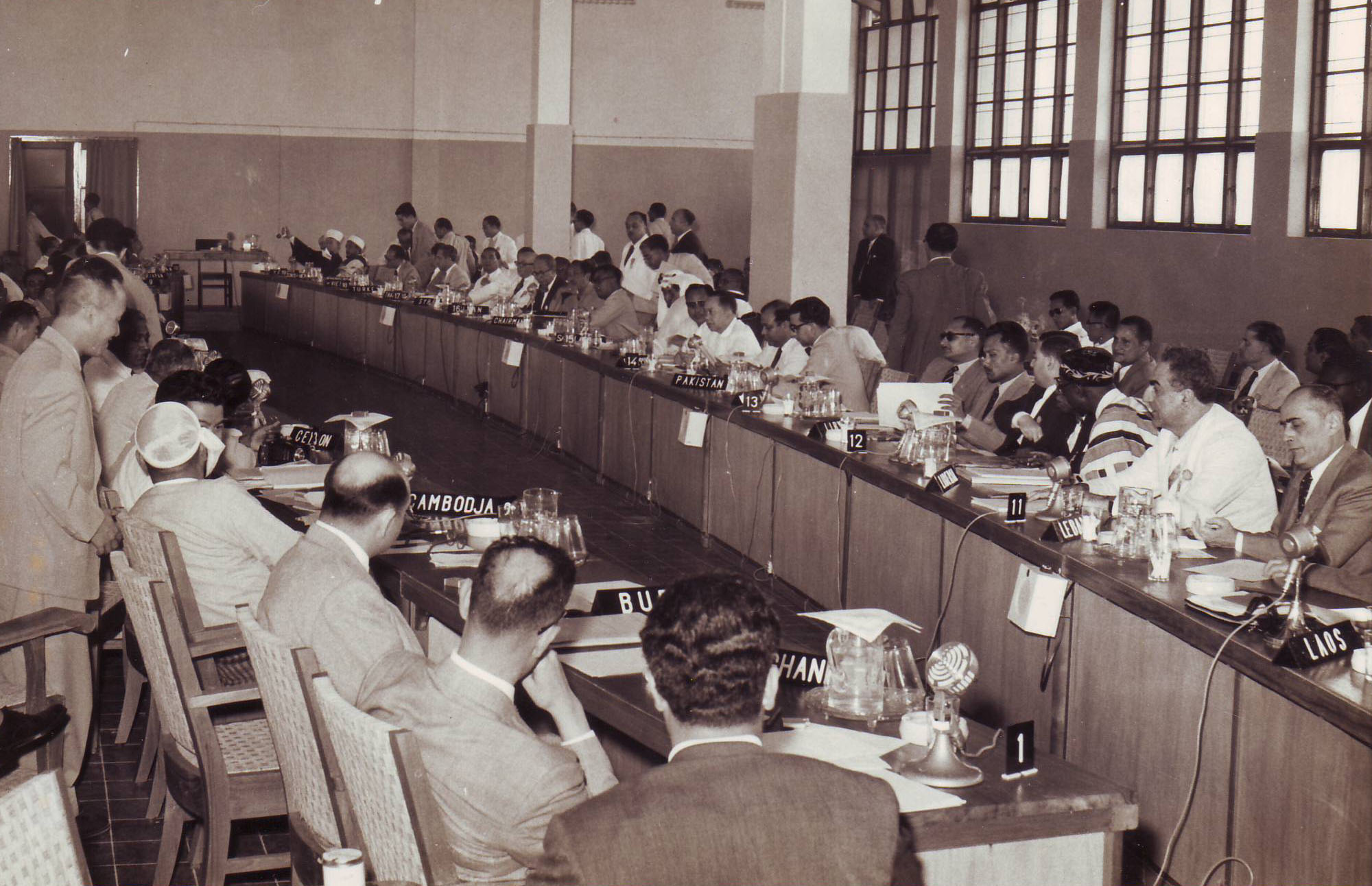
Delegations held a Plenary Meeting of the Economic Section during the Bandung Conference, April 1955.

Major debate centered on the question of whether Soviet policies in Eastern Europe and Central Asia should be censured along with Western colonialism. A memo was submitted by 'The Moslem Nations under Soviet Imperialism', accusing the Soviet authorities of massacres and mass deportations in Muslim regions, but it was never debated. A consensus was reached in which "colonialism in all of its manifestations" was condemned, implicitly censuring the Soviet Union, as well as the West. China played an important role in the conference and strengthened its relations with other Asian nations. Having survived an assassination attempt on the way to the conference, the Chinese premier, Zhou Enlai, displayed a moderate and conciliatory attitude that tended to quiet fears of some anticommunist delegates concerning China's intentions.

Later in the conference, Zhou Enlai signed an agreement on dual nationality with Indonesian foreign minister Sunario. World observers closely watched Zhou. He downplayed revolutionary communism and strongly endorsed the right of all nations to choose their own economic and political systems, including even capitalism. His moderation and reasonableness made a very powerful impression for his own diplomatic reputation and for China. By contrast, Nehru was bitterly disappointed at the generally negative reception he received. Nehru mainly advocated for non-alignment, The Five Principles of Peaceful Coexistence, and cautioned against military alliances with either side of the Cold War. Senior diplomats called him arrogant. Zhou said privately, "I have never met a more arrogant man than Mr. Nehru."

China began voicing support for Palestine at Bandung, with Zhou stating, "[T]here was a parallel between the problems of Palestine and Formosa; neither could be solved peacefully unless intervention by outside forces was excluded; China was suffering from the same problem as the Arab countries."

The 29 countries attending the Asia-Africa Conference.

Member states of the Non-Aligned Movement (2012). Light blue states have observer status.

== Declaration ==
A 10-point "declaration on promotion of world peace and cooperation", called Dasasila Bandung (Bandung's Ten Principles, or Bandung Spirit, or Bandung Declaration; styled after Indonesia's Pancasila; or Ten Principles of Peaceful Coexistence), incorporating the principles of the United Nations Charter as well as Five Principles of Peaceful Coexistence, was adopted unanimously as item G in the final communiqué of the conference. It later became a foundational framework for the Non-Aligned Movement, influencing diplomatic relations among developing nations during the Cold War.:

1. Respect for fundamental human rights and for the purposes and principles of the charter of the United Nations
2. Respect for the sovereignty and territorial integrity of all nations
3. Recognition of the equality of all races and of the equality of all nations large and small
4. Abstention from intervention or interference in the internal affairs of another country
5. Respect for the right of each nation to defend itself, singly or collectively, in conformity with the charter of the United Nations
6. (a) Abstention from the use of arrangements of collective defence to serve any particular interests of the big powers
  (b) Abstention by any country from exerting pressures on other countries
7. Refraining from acts or threats of aggression or the use of force against the territorial integrity or political independence of any country
8. Settlement of all international disputes by peaceful means, such as negotiation, conciliation, arbitration or judicial settlement and other peaceful means of the parties own choice, in conformity with the charter of the United Nations
9. Promotion of mutual interests and cooperation
10. Respect for justice and international obligations

The final Communique of the conference underscored the need for developing countries to loosen their economic dependence on the leading industrialised nations by providing technical assistance to one another through the exchange of experts and technical assistance for developmental projects, as well as the exchange of technological know-how and the establishment of regional training and research institutes.

== United States involvement ==
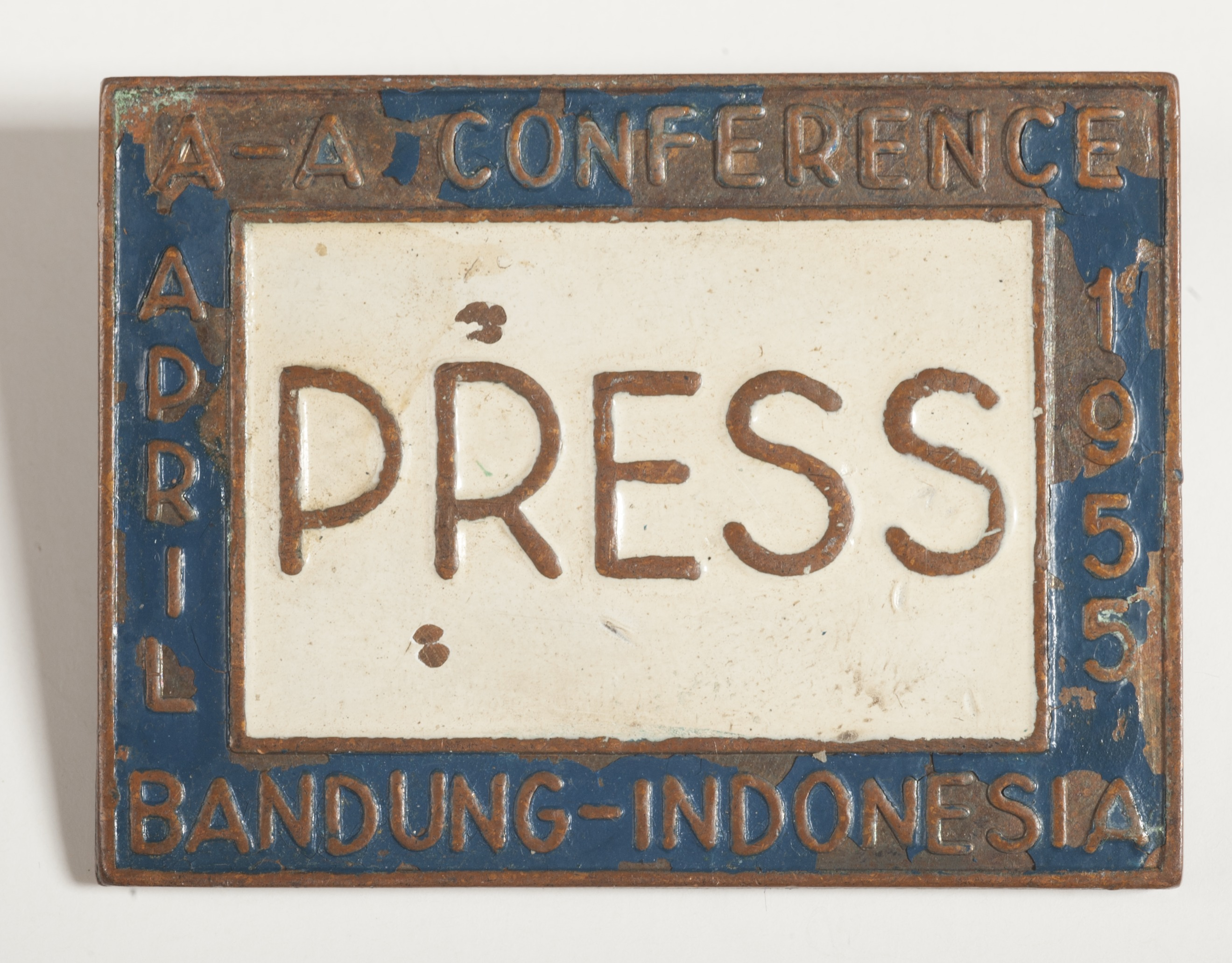
Press pin issued to American journalist Ethel Lois Payne for the conference.

For the US, the conference accentuated a central dilemma of its Cold War policy; by currying favor with Third World nations by claiming opposition to colonialism, it risked alienating its colonialist European allies. The US security establishment also feared that the conference would expand China's regional power. In January 1955, the US formed a "Working Group on the Afro-Asian Conference" that included the Operations Coordinating Board (OCB), the Office of Intelligence Research (OIR), the Department of State, the Department of Defense, the Central Intelligence Agency (CIA), and the United States Information Agency (USIA). The OIR and USIA followed a course of "Image Management" for the US, using overt and covert propaganda to portray the US as friendly and to warn participants about "Communist intentions".

The United States, at the urging of Secretary of State John Foster Dulles, shunned the conference and was not officially represented. However, the administration issued a series of statements during the lead-up to the conference. These suggested that the US would provide economic aid and attempted to reframe the issue of colonialism as a threat by China and the Eastern Bloc.

Representative Adam Clayton Powell Jr. (D-N.Y.) attended the conference, sponsored by Ebony and Jet magazines instead of the U.S. government. Powell spoke at some length in favor of American foreign policy there which assisted the US's standing with non-aligned states. When Powell returned to the United States, he urged President Dwight D. Eisenhower and Congress to oppose colonialism and pay attention to the priorities of emerging Third World nations.

African American author Richard Wright attended the conference with funding from the Congress for Cultural Freedom. Wright spent about three weeks in Indonesia, devoting a week to attending the conference and the rest of his time to interacting with Indonesian artists and intellectuals in preparation to write several articles and a book on his trip to Indonesia and attendance at the conference. Wright's essays on the trip appeared in several Congress for Cultural Freedom magazines, and his book on the trip was published as The Color Curtain: A Report on the Bandung Conference. Several of the artists and intellectuals with whom Wright interacted (including Mochtar Lubis, Asrul Sani, Sitor Situmorang and Beb Vuyk) continued discussing Wright's visit after he left Indonesia. Wright extensively praised the conference.

== Outcome and legacy ==
The conference was later followed by the Afro-Asian People's Solidarity Conference held in Cairo in September 1957 and subsequently by the Belgrade Summit in 1961, which resulted in the formation of the Non-Aligned Movement.

In the early 1960s, China sought to mobilize support of the Arab countries for a second Bandung Conference, proposed to be held in Algiers. The effort failed as a result of events including the 1965 Algerian coup d'état, the ouster of Sukarno in Indonesia, the 1966 Ghanaian coup d'état, and Egypt growing closer to the Soviet Union.

=== Asian-African Summit of 2005 ===
To mark the 50th anniversary of The Summit, Heads of State and Government of Asian-African countries attended a new Asian-African Summit from 20 to 24 April 2005 in Bandung and Jakarta hosted by President Susilo Bambang Yudhoyono. Some sessions of the new conference took place in Gedung Merdeka (Independence Building), the venue of the original conference. It was attended by

- Prime Minister of Japan, Junichiro Koizumi
- President of China, Hu Jintao
- United Nations Secretary General, Kofi Annan
- President of Pakistan, Pervez Musharraf
- President of Afghanistan, Hamid Karzai
- Prime Minister of Malaysia, Abdullah Ahmad Badawi
- Sultan of Brunei, Hassanal Bolkiah
- President of South Africa, Thabo Mbeki

Of the 106 nations invited to the historic summit, 89 were represented by their heads of state or government or ministers. The Summit was attended by 54 Asian and 52 African countries.

The 2005 Asian African Summit yielded, inter-alia, the Declaration of the New Asian–African Strategic Partnership (NAASP), the Joint Ministerial Statement on the NAASP Plan of Action, and the Joint Asian African Leaders' Statement on Tsunami, Earthquake and other Natural Disasters. The conclusion of aforementioned declaration of NAASP is the Nawasila (nine principles) supporting political, economic, and socio-cultural cooperation.

=== Other geopolitical impacts ===
During the conference Egyptian President Gamal Abdel Nasser met with Zhou Enlai regarding Egypt obtaining arms from the Soviet Union. Zhou stated that China would intercede with the Soviet Union on this issue, and later in 1955, Egypt obtained Soviet arms via Czechoslovakia. This was a milestone of the Soviet Union's increased diplomatic presence in the Middle East.

=== Other anniversaries ===
On the 60th anniversary of the Asian-African Conference and the 10th anniversary of the NAASP, a 3rd summit was held in Bandung and Jakarta from 21 to 25 April 2015, with the theme Strengthening South-South Cooperation to Promote World Peace and Prosperity. Hosted by President Joko Widodo of Indonesia, delegates from 109 Asian and African countries, 16 observer countries, and 25 international organizations participated, including

- Prime Minister of Japan, Shinzo Abe
- President of China, Xi Jinping
- Prime Minister of Singapore, Lee Hsien Loong
- King Abdullah II of Jordan
- Prime Minister of Malaysia, Najib Tun Razak
- President of Myanmar, Thein Sein
- King Mswati III of Swaziland
- Prime Minister of Nepal, Sushil Koirala.

On the 70th anniversary of the first African-Asian (Bandung) conference, Bharat Summit was organized by the Telangana government from April 24–26, 2025 in Hyderabad, India. Theme of the summit was 'Delivering Global Justice'.

== Participants ==
- Kingdom of Afghanistan
- Union of Burma
- Kingdom of Cambodia
- Dominion of Ceylon
- People's Republic of China (Note: The Republic of China was internationally recognized as the legitimate government of China by most of the international community at the time.)
- Republic of Egypt
- Ethiopian Empire
- Gold Coast (Note: British colony. Would gain independence as Ghana in 1957.)
- Republic of India
- Republic of Indonesia
- Imperial State of Iran
- Kingdom of Iraq
- Japan
- Hashemite Kingdom of Jordan
- Kingdom of Laos
- Lebanese Republic
- Liberia
- Kingdom of Libya
- Kingdom of Nepal
- Dominion of Pakistan
- Republic of the Philippines
- Kingdom of Saudi Arabia
- Syrian Republic
- Sudan (Note: Pre-independence Anglo-Egyptian Sudan was represented by Chief Minister Ismail al-Azhari and used a provisional flag.)
- Kingdom of Thailand
- Republic of Turkey
- Democratic Republic of Vietnam (North)
- State of Vietnam (South)
- Mutawakkilite Kingdom of Yemen

Observer States:

- Republic of the United States of Brazil
- Crown Colony of Cyprus (Note: A pre-independent colonial Cyprus was represented by eventual first president, Makarios III.)

Some nations were given "observer status". Such was the case of Brazil, who sent Ambassador Bezerra de Menezes.

== See also ==
- Cairo Conference
- Afro-Asian People's Solidarity Organisation
- Asian–African Legal Consultative Organization
- Conference of the New Emerging Forces
- Five Principles of Peaceful Coexistence
- Jakarta–Peking Axis
- Non-Aligned Movement
- Sino–Third World relations
- Sino-Indonesian Dual Nationality Treaty
- Third World
