= China Aid =

China Aid may refer to:

- ChinaAid.org, a Christian human rights organization based in Midland, Texas, United States
- China Aid Society, a now-defunct society founded in 1937 during the second Sino-Japanese war
- China International Development Cooperation Agency, the Chinese government's international development agency, also branded as China Aid
