= China–Third World relations =

- Third World: China

The People's Republic of China's relations with the Third World were next in importance to its relations with the superpowers—the Soviet Union and United States—during the Cold War. Chinese leaders have tended to view the developing nations of Asia, Africa, and Latin America as a major force in international affairs, and they have considered China an integral part of this major Third World force. As has been the case with China's foreign relations in general, policy toward the countries of the developing world has fluctuated over time. It has been affected by China's alternating involvement in and isolation from world affairs and by the militancy or peacefulness of Beijing's views. In addition, China's relations with the Third World have been affected by China's ambiguous position as a developing country that nevertheless has certain attributes more befitting a major power. China has been variously viewed by the Third World as a friend and ally, a competitor for markets and loans, a source of economic assistance, a regional power intent on dominating Asia, and a "candidate superpower" with such privileges as a permanent seat on the UN Security Council.

In addition to bilateral relations, China conducts international relations with other Third World countries through a variety of multi-lateral bodies or programs, including the Belt and Road Initiative, BRICS, the Forum on Africa-China Cooperation, the China-Arab States Cooperation Forum, and the G77.

== History ==
China's relations with the Third World have developed through several phases: the Bandung Line of the mid-1950s (named for a 1955 Bandung Conference of Asian and African nations held in Bandung, Indonesia), support for liberation and world revolution in the 1960s, the pronouncement of the Theory of the Three Worlds and support for a "new international economic order" in the 1970s, and a renewed emphasis on the Five Principles of Peaceful Coexistence in the 1980s. Chinese government provides consistent political support to the Group of 77 and has made financial contributions to the Group since 1994. As a result, official statements of the G77 are delivered in the name of The Group of 77 and China. In addition, the foundation for China's 21st century engagement with Africa as the largest bloc of the Third World is the October 2000 Beijing ministerial conference for China-Africa dialogue (FOCAC) that set the basis for China's aspirations for a new world order, with elevated voice of the Third World.

=== Early years of the People's Republic ===
China began developing relations with the Third World countries in 1954. The Bandung Conference in 1955, at which Zhou Enlai led the Chinese delegation, was an important milestone for China's foreign relations. China developed its foreign relations with many newly independent and soon-to-be independent countries. China termed this cooperative approach the "Bandung Line." This was the beginning of China's official discourse of South-South cooperation. China's Five Principles of Peaceful Coexistence were incorporated into the Ten Principles of Bandung.

=== 1960s ===
During the 1960s China cultivated ties with Third World countries and insurgent groups in an attempt to encourage "wars of national liberation" and revolution and to forge an international united front against both superpowers. China offered economic and technical assistance to other countries and liberation movements, which, although small in comparison with Soviet and United States aid, was significant considering China's own needs. Third World appreciation for Chinese assistance coexisted, however, with growing suspicions of China's militancy. Such suspicions were fed, for example, by Zhou Enlai's statement in the early 1960s that the potential for revolution in Africa was "excellent" and by the publication of Lin Biao's essay "Long Live the Victory of People's War!" in 1965. Discord between China and many Third World countries continued to grow. In some cases, as with Indonesia's charge of Chinese complicity in the 1965 coup attempt in Jakarta and claims by several African nations of Chinese subversion during the Cultural Revolution, bilateral disputes led to the breaking off of diplomatic relations. Although the Third World was not a primary focus of the Cultural Revolution, it was not immune to the chaos this period wrought upon Chinese foreign relations.

=== 1970s ===
In the 1970s, China began to redefine its foreign policy after the isolation and militancy of the late 1960s. China reestablished those of its diplomatic missions that had been recalled during the Cultural Revolution and began the process of rapprochement with the United States. In 1971, the support of Third World nations was crucial in the PRC joining the United Nations (UN), taking over the seat of the ROC on Taiwan. China preferred a United Nations Secretary-General from the Third World.

China's major foreign policy statement during this time was Mao's Theory of the Three Worlds, which was announced at the UN in 1974 by Deng Xiaoping.

According to this theory, the First World consisted of the two superpowers—the Soviet Union and the United States—both "imperialist aggressors" whose rivalry was the greatest cause of impending world war. The Third World was the main force in international affairs. Its growing opposition to superpower hegemony was exemplified by such world events as the Arab nations' control of oil prices, Egypt's expulsion of Soviet aid personnel in 1972, and the United States withdrawal from Vietnam. The Second World, comprising the developed countries of Europe plus Japan, could either oppress the Third World or join in opposing the superpowers. By the second half of the 1970s, China perceived an increased threat from the Soviet Union, and the theory was modified to emphasize that the Soviet Union was the more dangerous of the two superpowers.

The other primary component of China's Third World policy in the early 1970s was a call for radical change in the world power structure and particularly a call for a "new international economic order." Until the late 1970s, the Chinese principles of sovereignty, opposition to hegemony, and self-reliance coincided with the goals of the movement for a new international economic order. Chinese statements in support of the new order diminished as China began to implement the opening up policy, allow foreign investment, and seek technical assistance and foreign loans. China's critical opinion of international financial institutions appeared to change abruptly as Beijing prepared to join the International Monetary Fund and the World Bank in 1980. Chinese support for changes in the economic order stressed the role of collective self-reliance among the countries of the Third World, or "South-South Cooperation," in the 1980s.

=== 1980s ===
Also in the 1980s, China reasserted its Third World credentials and placed a renewed emphasis on its relations with Third World countries as part of its independent foreign policy. China stressed that it would develop friendly relations with other nations regardless of their social systems or ideologies and would conduct its relations on the basis of the Five Principles of Peaceful Coexistence. Beijing exchanged delegations with Third World countries regularly, and it made diplomatic use of cultural ties, for example, by promoting friendly links between Chinese Muslims and Islamic countries. Officially, China denied that it sought a leadership role in the Third World, although some foreign observers argued to the contrary. Beijing increasingly based its foreign economic relations with the Third World on equality and mutual benefit, expressed by a shift toward trade and joint ventures and away from grants and interest-free loans.

By the second half of the 1980s, China's relations with Third World nations covered the spectrum from friendly to inimical. Bilateral relations ranged from a formal alliance with North Korea, to a near-alliance with Pakistan, to hostile relations with Vietnam marked by sporadic border conflict. Many relationships have changed dramatically over time: for example, China previously had close relations with Vietnam; its ties with India were friendly during the 1950s but were strained thereafter by border tensions and Pakistan hoped that China would serve as a counterweight to Indian influence. Particularly in Southeast Asia, a legacy of suspicion concerning China's ultimate intentions affected Chinese relations with many countries.

=== Present ===
China has a major role in fostering cooperation among the global south countries in the area of climate change and clean energy. China engaged in South-South climate and clean energy cooperation through: (1) bilateral clean energy agreements, (2) multilateral clean energy cooperation, (3) expanding exports of its clean energy technology to other developing countries, and (4) foreign energy infrastructure development via the Belt and Road Initiative. Much of China's overall South-South Cooperation is now explicitly linked to the BRI. The BRI is likewise tied to the concepts of the Chinese Dream and the Community of Common Destiny.

China's infrastructure lending has also increased the level of policy autonomy that the developing countries it lends to have at the World Bank. For example, a study by academic Diego Hernandez finds that countries which received loans from China had 15% conditions for every percentage point increase in Chinese development finance.

The "Ten, Hundred, Thousand" program is China's overarching initiative for South-South cooperation in addressing climate change. As of 2023, China had signed partnerships with at least 27 other developing countries as part of this initiative. Through framing BRI and other economic mechanisms as South-South cooperation, China seeks to position itself as a global South leader and draw a contrast with the global North countries.

China is a major contributor to digital development in the global south. China began to engage in digital initiatives with the global south, such as telecommunications projects, as part of its Go Out policy since 1999.

BRICS is a further mechanism for China's cooperation with the global south and functions as a forum for policy coordination among its members.

The Forum on China-Africa Cooperation is the primary multi-lateral coordination mechanism between African countries and China.Along with the China-Arab States Cooperation Forum (CASCF), FOCAC was one of the first regional organizations established by China outside its territorial periphery. As of 2022, the members of FOCAC are 53 African countries (all except Eswatini), China, and the African Union Commission. A number of North African states are dual members of both CASCF and FOCAC: Algeria, Djibouti, Egypt, Libya, Mauritania, Morocco, Somalia, Sudan, and Tunisia. Although the African Union has increasingly played a coordinating role since joining CASCF in 2012, each African state represents itself in FOCAC and activities are implemented bilaterally between China and individual African countries.

CASCF was established in 2004 during a visit by Chinese President Hu Jintao to the Arab League headquarters in Cairo, Egypt. CASCF was the first cooperation forum between the Arab League and any other country or region. CASCF membership consists of China and the Arab League, which officially represents its twenty-two member states as a relatively unified body. CASCF therefore serves as the primary multilateral coordination mechanism between China and the Arab States. This coordination by the Arab League allows Arab states to negotiate actively for collective projects involving multiple states, such as railway projects, nuclear power projects, and Dead Sea initiatives.

Effective 1 December 2024, China eliminated tariffs for goods imported from all of the countries that the United Nations categorizes as least developed and with which China has diplomatic relations. Thirty-three of the countries benefiting from the agreement are in Africa and the non-African countries receiving zero tariff treatment are Yemen, Kiribati, the Solomon Islands, Afghanistan, Bangladesh, Cambodia, Laos, Myanmar, Nepal, and East Timor.

== Third World conflicts involving China ==
One primary motivation for involvement in third world conflicts for PRC and ROC was to gain influence and legitimacy, claiming to be the only 'China' while undermining other side. This was part wider pattern in the Cold War where the world was divided into spheres of influence. Later the Sino-Soviet Split occurred, with the PRC completing against the Soviet Union for influence.

Time	Country/Region	Conflict/Event	Role of China	Role of Taiwan
7 October 2023 – present	Gaza Strip and Israel	Gaza war	China has offered diplomatic support, such as in 2024 Beijing Declaration	On 23 October 2023, Taiwanese representative to Israel Lee Ya-Ping donated US$70,000 to Israeli NGO Pitchon-Lev as aid to Israeli soldiers and families affected by the war.
5 May 2021 – present	Myanmar	Myanmar civil war (2021–present)	Foreign involvement in the Myanmar civil war (2021–present)	
15 April 2023 – present	Sudan	Sudanese civil war (2023–present)	In July 2024, Amnesty International reported that large numbers of recently manufactured weapons and ammunition were being transported into Sudan from China, Russia, Turkey, Yemen, the UAE and Serbia.	
10 January 2019 – present	Venezuela	2019 Venezuelan presidential crisis	China has backed the Nicolás Maduro government in Venezuela through diplomatic and financial support. On 28 February 2019, China and Russia vetoed a Security Council resolution which would have recognized Juan Guaidó as the legitimate president of Venezuela.	The Republic of China (Taiwan) recognized the National Assembly.
23 May – 23 October 2017	Marawi, Lanao del Sur, Philippines	Battle of Marawi	China donated 50 million renminbi worth of arms aid which comprises around 3,000 rifles and 6 million pieces of ammunition. Three types of rifles were given; sniper rifles, automatic rifles, and marksman rifles.	
July 1, 2016 – present	Philippines	Philippine drug war	China has co-operated with the Duterte government by providing intelligence and financial support.	
15 March 2011 – present	Syria	Syrian Civil War	China has supported Syria diplomatically at the UN, using its veto 6 times, along with Russia to prevent Western efforts to punish and sanction the Syrian government of Bashar al-Assad.	
26 February 2003 – 31 August 2020	Darfur, Sudan	War in Darfur	PRC has supplied weapons and aircraft to Sudan government.	
26 December 1991 – 8 February 2002	Algeria	Algerian Civil War	PRC has provide aid in the form of military funding, such as US$100 million in arms.	
23 July 1983 – 18 May 2009	Sri Lanka	Sri Lankan Civil War	During the last years of the civil war, from 2007, China supplied the Sri Lankan Armed forces financial aid of nearly $1bn, tens of millions of dollars' worth of sophisticated weapons, and making a free gift of six F7 fighter jets. China also prevented the UN Security Council from putting Sri Lanka on its agenda. With these factors, the Sri Lankan Armed forces managed to defeat the Tamil Tigers.	
22 September 1980 – 20 August 1988	Iran, Iraq	Iran–Iraq War	During the Iran–Iraq War, China, which had no direct stake in the victory of either side and whose interests in the war were entirely commercial, freely sold arms to both sides. Along with many other countries selling arms to either Iran or Iraq, this contributed to prolonging the war.	
24 December 1979 – 15 February 1989	Afghanistan	Soviet–Afghan War	The People's Liberation Army trained and supported the Afghan mujahideen during the war, with training camps set up in Xinjiang, China. Anti-aircraft missiles, rocket launchers and machine guns, valued at hundreds of millions, were given to the mujahideen by the PRC. Chinese military advisers and troops were present with the Islamists during training. All this was done to undermine the Soviet Union and to prevent the USSR from attempting to encircle China. China's support, along with that of other countries', helped the Taliban and Al-Qaeda rise in Afghanistan.	
15 October 1979 – 16 January 1992	El Salvador	Salvadoran Civil War		The ROC sold weapons to the military-led regime of El Salvador to fight against several left-wing rebel groups.
1978–1982	North Yemen	NDF Rebellion, Yemenite War of 1979		80 ROC F-5E pilots plus ground crew were sent to North Yemen to boost its air defense, joining 400 US advisers. At least one squadron strength was kept throughout the period, flying North Yemen's F-5E fleet.
13 July 1977 – 15 March 1978	Ogaden, Ethiopia	Ogaden War	Due to the Sino-Soviet Split, China choose to support Somalia with military aid, whereas the almost of all the rest the communist countries supported Ethiopia.	
30 April 1977 – 23 October 1991	Cambodia	Cambodian–Vietnamese War, Vietnamese border raids in Thailand	In the context of the Sino-soviet split, PRC saw Vietnam and Laos proxies of the USSR, while Cambodia under Pol Pot's Khmer Rouge became a client state of People's Republic of China. The war began with isolated clashes along the land and maritime boundaries of Vietnam and Kampuchea between 1975 and 1977. Kampuchean leaders feared what they perceived as Vietnamese expansionism/domination into Cambodia, pre-empt a military attack on Vietnam, despite mediation attempts from China, Vietnamese leaders decided to remove the Khmer Rouge dominated regime of Democratic Kampuchea, perceiving it as being pro-Chinese and too hostile towards Vietnam, as they were unwilling to compromise. By this time both countries were busy strengthening its armed forces, with Khmer Rouge receiving Chinese support. In previous years, China had only provided the Kampuchean Revolutionary Army with a limited amount of arms and ammunition, but as relations with Vietnam worsened in 1978, Beijing established additional supply routes through Kampuchea and increased the volume of military hardware which traveled down each route. On the eve of the Vietnamese invasion, Kampuchea had an estimated 73,000 soldiers in the Eastern Military Zone bordering Vietnam. At that time, all branches of the Kampuchean armed forces were significantly strengthened by large quantities of Chinese-made military equipment, which included fighter aircraft, patrol boats, heavy artillery, anti-aircraft guns, trucks and tanks. Additionally, there were between 10,000 and 20,000 Chinese advisers in both military and civilian capacities, providing their support to the Khmer Rouge regime. Despite Chinese military support, the Khmer Rouge were overthrown by Vietnamese forces, however the genocidal Khmer Rouge continued to be recognized internationally until 1991 at the UN as the legitimate government of Cambodia, thanks to Chinese support.	
March 8 – 26 May 1977	Shaba Province, Zaire	Shaba I	In defiance of Soviet and Cuban goals, due to the Sino-Soviet Split, the People's Republic of China sent weapons to support Mobutu Sese Seko of Zaire, instead of Front for the National Liberation of the Congo (FNLC) rebel organization.	
3 December 1975 – 1990	Laos	Insurgency in Laos	In response to Laos' staunch alignment with and unequivocal support for Vietnam, during its conflict over Cambodia, China supported Royalist-in-exile insurgency and Right-wing insurgency against the Pathet Lao. China later ceased support in 1988.	
11 November 1975 – 4 April 2002	Angola	Angolan Civil War	In order to counter to Soviet influence and gain some of its own influence, China provided aid to UNITA, a Maoist organisation until 1977 (afterwards its ideology changed to a more capitalistic view due to the influence of the United States), against the Marxism–Leninism MPLA.	
26 March 1971 – 16 December 1971	East Pakistan	Bangladesh Liberation War, Indo-Pakistani War of 1971	China supported Pakistan diplomatically through the war, such calling for an immediate ceasefire and vetoing Bangladesh's entry to the UN, until two UN resolutions regarding the repatriation of Pakistani prisoners of war and civilians had been fulfilled.	
29 March 1969 – present	Philippines	Communist insurgency in Philippines	The PRC provided support to the Communist Party of the Philippines and its armed wing to New People's Army from 1969–1976 to help overthrow the Philippines government. However relations between the PRC and CCP have been served since the 1980s.	
17 June 1968 – 2 December 1989	Peninsular Malaysia	Communist insurgency in Malaysia (1968–89)	PRC provided assistance to Malayan Communist Party to fight against the Malaysian Government, however military assistance ceased in 1974, and last financial assistance package occurring in the early 1980s.	
1968–1982	Jordan, Lebanon, Israel	Black September, Palestinian insurgency in South Lebanon	PRC provided aid to PLO, especially to its left-wing communist fractions of Democratic Front for the Liberation of Palestine (DFLP) and Popular Front for the Liberation of Palestine (PFLP) in its fight for the liberation of Palestine. However, aid was significantly reduced when Deng Xiaoping came to power.	
29 July – 1 August 1967	Laos	1967 Opium War		Abandoned KMT army units stuck in Thailand, Myanmar and Indochina engaged in the drug trade to survive. A battle between a Burmese drug cartel, Khun Sa's forces, KMT forces and the Royal Lao Army occurred, resulting increase publicity of the drug trafficking in the region
6 July 1967 – 15 January 1970	Nigeria	Nigerian Civil War	In its first major statement on the war in September 1968, the Xinhua Press Agency stated the People's Republic of China fully supported the justified struggle for liberation of the people of Biafra against the Nigerian government supported by "Anglo-American imperialism and Soviet revisionism". China supported arms to Biafra via Tanzania, supplying arms worth some $2 million in 1968–1969. The Soviet Union was one of Nigeria's leading supporters, supplying arms on a generous scale. China's recent rivalry with the Soviets in the Sino-Soviet split, may have influenced its support for Biafra.	
26–29 June 1967	Burma	1967 anti-Chinese riots in Burma	The PRC radicalized the Chinese people in Burma, though its Cultural Revolution promotion, at the same time Burma was implementing its Burmese Way to Socialism, which imposed restrictions on the Burmese Chinese. However Burmese rioters attack Chinese-owned businesses and the PRC embassy killing many Chinese. Chinese vice foreign minister demanded the Burmese government punish the rioters, recompense the families of the victims, make a public apology, and ensure the safety of embassy staff and Chinese citizens in Burma. The Burma government responded with rejecting China's demands. The movements of Chinese embassy staff and Chinese expatriates in Rangoon were restricted as well as the activities of Chinese entities. The Burmese ambassador to China was recalled and China's economic assistance program and its trade agreements with Burma were cancelled.	
18 May 1967–present	India, Red corridor	Naxalite–Maoist insurgency	According to Indian sources, the People's Republic of China has been supporting the Naxalites in their insurgency against the Indian government for over 5 decades, with Pakistan, Nepal, Burma acting as middle-men when receiving support. China denies this. However, according to the CIA sources, China did support the Maoists/communists in the beginning, but support dwindled due to the Sino-Soviet Split and death of Mao Zedong.	
May–December 1967	British Hong Kong	Hong Kong 1967 leftist riots	The PRC sponsored and supported leftists organisations in British Hong Kong such as the Hong Kong Federation of Trade Unions to cause unrest in Hong Kong, in the form of strikes, protests, riots, terrorist attacks (bomb attacks and assassinations). Their aim was to overthrow the colonial government and reunify Hong Kong back to China.	
11 March 1967 – 17 April 1975	Cambodia	Cambodian Civil War	The PRC sponsored and supported leftists/communist organisations in Cambodian Civil War.	
November 1966 – January 1967	Portuguese Macau	12-3 incident	The PRC sponsored and encouraged leftists in Macau to riot in an attempt to overthrow the colonial government. The rioters began destroying statues, ripping out portraits of former governors from government buildings, as well as taking books and city records into the street to burn them. The aftermath of the riots lead to a greater influence of PRC-camp in Macau	The aftermath of the riots lead to decrease of ROC influence in Macau, with many of their activities being banned.
26 August 1966 – 21 March 1990	Namibia, Angola, Zambia	South African Border War	PRC provided material assistance to the People's Liberation Army of Namibia (PLAN), the armed wing of the South West African People's Organisation (SWAPO) to fight against Apartheid South Africa in order to achieve Namibian independence.	
1965–1983	Thailand	Communist insurgency in Thailand	PRC provided support to the Communist Party of Thailand (CPT) from 1971–1978 to fight against the Thai government.	Li Mi's ROC 49th Division co-operated with military of Thailand to combat local Communist insurgents through counter-insurgency operations, until 1967. Li Mi's former troops then came under the command of the Thai army, with the unit renamed the "Chinese Irregular Forces" (CIF).
25 September 1964 – 8 September 1974	Mozambique	Mozambican War of Independence	PRC provided military weapons to the FRELIMO guerrilla forces to achieve Mozambique's Independence from the Portuguese Empire.	
20 September 1964 – October 1992	Vietnam, Cambodia	FULRO insurgency against Vietnam	Taking advantage of Vietnam's mistreatment of its ethnic minorities, the PRC provided support to the United Front for the Liberation of Oppressed Races (FULRO), in an attempt to disrupt Vietnam's development and to put pressure on Vietnam to change its policies in relation to its involvement in Cambodia and refusing to side with China in the Sino-Soviet Split.	
4 July 1964 – 12 December 1979	Rhodesia	Rhodesian Bush War	During its War of Independence, China provided support and aid to the Maoist/Pro-PRC ZANU organisation and its military wing ZANLA.	
January – November 1964	Democratic Republic of the Congo	Simba rebellion	The PRC supported the Simba rebels.	
April 1963 – 11 March 1976	Oman	Dhofar Rebellion	PRC provided support to the PFLOAG from 1968 to 1974, hoping to overthrow the Omani government.	
23 January 1963 – 10 September 1974	Guinea-Bissau, Guinea	Guinea-Bissau War of Independence	China provided material assistance to African Party for the Independence of Guinea and Cape Verde (PAIGC) to fight against the Colonial Portuguese Armed Forces.	
20 January 1963 – 11 August 1966	Malay Peninsula, Borneo	Indonesia–Malaysia confrontation	PRC supported Indonesia's hegemonic claims on Malaysia and provided aid to Indonesia's armed forces along with other allied leftist organisations involved in the confrontation.	
December 1962 – November 1990	Sarawak, Malaysia	Communist insurgency in Sarawak	The PRC provided support to the North Kalimantan Communist Party to fight against Malaysian government.	
1 September 1961 – 4 June 1991	Eritrea & Ethiopia	Eritrean War of Independence, Ethiopian Civil War	The PRC provided support to the Eritrean People's Liberation Front to undermine the Soviet-backed Ethiopia and achieve its independence.	
4 February 1961 – 25 April 1974	Angola	Angolan War of Independence	During its war of Independence, China provided military assistance to MPLA, FNLA and UNITA in varying degrees to help achieve Angola's Independence from Portugal.	
13 November 1960 – 29 December 1996	Guatemala	Guatemalan Civil War	On 10 January 1997, PRC vetoed a UN resolution supporting the Guatemalan Peace Process 1994-1996, in protest of government of Guatemala recognizing ROC over PRC. This caused a minor delay in the peace process.	ROC provided logistic support to the right-wing military regime of Guatemala during the civil war to fight against various leftist rebel groups.
1957—1961	East Indonesia	Permesta		ROC sent troops as mercenaries as part of CIA support to the Permesta rebels, as part of United States's goal to undermine Indonesia who at that time was drifting towards the Soviet Union's sphere of influence.
10 October 1956	British Hong Kong	Hong Kong 1956 riots	PRC organisations in Hong Kong participated in the riots	ROC organisations in Hong Kong participated in the riots
1 November 1955 – 30 April 1975	North Vietnam	Vietnam War	PRC support for the Vietnamese communists included both financial aid and the deployment of hundreds of thousands of military personnel in support roles. PRC sent 320,000 troops and annual arms shipments worth $180 million.	Main article: Republic of China in the Vietnam War
1 November 1954 – 19 March 1962	Algeria	Algerian War	Between 1958 and 1962, China provided assistance to the Armée de Libération Nationale – the armed wing of the Front de Libération Nation (FLN) – in the form of funds, arms and training for Algerian officers.	
9 November 1953 – 2 December 1975	Laos	Laotian Civil War	PRC provided support for the Laotian communists, Pathet Lao.	ROC provided logistic support for US armed forces.
17 December 1950 – 27 April 1994	South Africa	Internal resistance to apartheid	PRC opposed Apartheid policies of South Africa and supported the Maoist Pan Africanist Congress of Azania and its armed wing, Azanian People's Liberation Army in its anti-apartheid struggle.	
25 June 1950 – 27 July 1953	Korea	Korean War	In October 1950, the PVA or People's Volunteer Army intervened in the Korean War on the side of the North Korea's forces as United Nations-backed South Korea's forces under General Douglas MacArthur approached the Yalu River. Under the weight of this offensive, Chinese forces captured Seoul, but were subsequently pushed back to a line roughly straddling the 38th Parallel. The war ended with an Armistice Agreement in 1953.	ROC secret agents were present during interrogation of PVA prisoners of wars (POWs). At the end of the war, a total of 14,235 out of 21,800 Chinese POWs decided to go to Taiwan thus defecting from the PRC.
16 June 1948 – 12 July 1960	Southeast Asia	Malayan Emergency	PRC supported the Malayan Communist Party at the conflict to fight against the Malayan Government. Malayan Government and its successors have considered the Malayan Communist Party as an illegal, terrorist organization.	
2 April 1948 – present	Myanmar	Internal conflict in Myanmar	Since 1988, China supported the insurgency groups such as the United Wa State Party and the United Wa State Army along the Myanmar-China border. Recent reports have indicated that China appeared to play both sides against each other (the Myanmar government and the insurgency groups) for its own strategic interests	
2 April 1948 – 21 September 1988	Myanmar	Communist insurgency in Myanmar	During the insurgency, PRC maintained contacts with the Communist Party (Burma), but never provided material nor military support, only financial, psychological, strategic advice and military training.	
September 13, 1945 – August 1, 1954	French Indochina	War in Vietnam (1945–46), First Indochina War	From 1949, the People's Republic of China supported the Vietnamese communists against the French Colonial forces from 1949 to 1954. In the early 1950s, southern China was used as a sanctuary by Việt Minh guerrillas. China supplied the Viet Minh guerrillas with food, money, medics, arms, ammunition, artillery and other military equipment, along with 2,000 Chinese and Soviet Union military advisors trained the Viet Minh guerrilla force to turn it into a well-professional army.	The Republic of China provided sanctuary and voiced support to Việt Nam Quốc Dân Đảng forces.

== See also ==
- Sino-African relations
- Sino-Pacific relations
- Sino-Caribbean relations
- Communist front
