= Liu Liangmo =

20th-century Chinese religious and political figure

- simplified Chinese: 刘良模; traditional Chinese: 劉良模; pinyin: Liú Liángmó; Wade–Giles: Liu Liang-mo
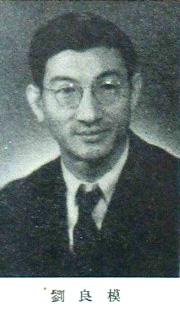
- Born: 6 November 1909; Ningbo, China
- Died: 8 August 1988 (aged 78); Shanghai, China
- Education: University of Shanghai
- Occupation: YMCA leader
- Known for: Mass singing campaigns

Liu Liangmo (Chinese: t 劉良模, s 刘良模, p Liú Liángmó) (6 November 1909 – 8 August 1988) was a musician and Chinese Christian leader known for his promotion of the patriotic mass singing movement in the 1930s and promotion in the United States of support for China's resistance to Japan in World War II. He was a leader in the Three-Self Patriotic Movement (TSPM) after 1949.

== Education and discovery of mass singing ==
Liu was born between November 11, 1908, and November 9, 1909, in Zhenhai County (now Ningbo), Zhejiang province. His family was poor.

Liu's father died when he was 18 months old. His mother worked to send Liu and his older brother Liu Liangtza to school.

Liu became a scholarship student and attended the Baptist Minqiang Academy in Shanghai and the Middle School Affiliated to the University of Shanghai from 1922 to 1928. Liu was active in the student union and contributed essays to the school journal. He won second place in a national essay competition presided over by Ma Yinchu on the topic of defeating opium addiction.

While in middle school Liu converted to Christianity and soon became a student secretary (organizer) for the Shanghai YMCA. From 1928 to 1932, he attended University of Shanghai, a Baptist missionary institution, where he did not receive formal musical training but sang in the university church choir. During his time at University of Shanghai, the family's finances worsened. Liu supported his studies with a scholarship, a student loans, part-time jobs, and some royalties from his essay-writing. Liu graduated in 1932 with a degree in sociology with honors.

Liu began worker as a social worker. He then took a position with the Chinese National YMCA.

China did not have a tradition of mass choruses, but Christian church congregations and mission student groups had begun to use music as an attraction as early as the 19th century. Inspired by an American book which discussed the use of community song, Music United People, Liu began teaching mass singing to improve wartime morale and promote national unity. Liu declared "My plan was to make music the possession of all and not the privilege of the few." In February 1935, with encouragement from the YMCA, Liu established a mass singing club for some sixty clerks, doorkeepers, office boys, elevator operators, and apprentices. Within a week, the number of participants had nearly tripled, and by mid-1936 the group, known as the People's Song Association, had attracted more than 1,000 members, with regional branches in Hong Kong and Guangzhou.

== Mass singing and resistance to Japan ==
Liu wrote in 1935

If we Chinese want to break free of imperialism's iron shackles..., if we want China to exert itself, our people must be able to loudly and vigorously sing powerful songs full of spirit and vitality. If the people of China can sing these songs, no doubt the sound will shake the earth. Any youth who can sing should spread the "people's song" movement to each province, city, county, and countryside. The dawning of a new China will arrive when all the people of China can sing these majestic and powerful songs.

In June 1936 Liu stood on a two-meter high platform in a sports arena in Shanghai packed with thousands to lead a several hundred member chorus in the March of the Volunteers, a patriotic song which after 1949 became the national anthem. Mass singing became even more widespread as it proved its ability to mobilize patriotic support for the government following the Xi'an Incident of December 1936.

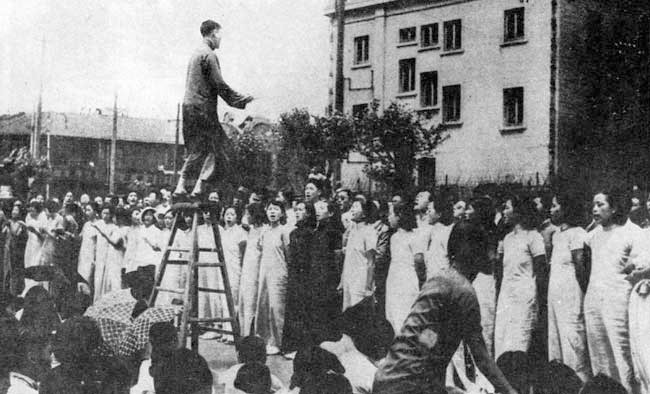
Liu leads a YMCA Patriotic Youth Chorus, Shanghai 1936

As relations with Japan grew more tense, in February 1937, at the invitation of General Fu Zuoyi and acting under the auspices of the national YMCA, Liu formed a war zone Soldier Relief Board in Suiyuan, in western China. Liu later recalled that General Fu told him that "Mass singing and slogans are the two great weapons to train the people and soldiers. Of the two, singing is more important because during the war it can stimulate a spirit of unity among our soldiers and masses."

Israel Epstein, then a young reporter for a Tianjin newspaper, reported many years later that he first heard Liu in the gymnasium of the Tianjin YMCA in the summer of 1937. The hall was filled with "ordinary people from the street – students, petty clerks, workmen, schoolchildren, newsboys, and even rickshaw pullers," who "with serious faces repeated the separate phrase of the song they were being taught. Then they sang two phrases at a time. Then a whole stanza...." Epstein further recalled that Liu

seemed to be listening to and prompting each singer separately, while at the same time he never stopped singing. He seemed two men – one singing, like his audience with relieved passion at being able at last to utter the 'one last cry' of every Chinese; the other disciplined and methodical, teaching and listening.

Two Japanese detectives appeared, and some of the audience seemed intimidated, but Liu merely said that the doors of the hall were open to all who had come to sing, and asked the detectives to join in singing "March of the Volunteers." Afterwards Liu explained to Epstein that if he had allowed the Japanese to intimidate him, the young men he hoped to train would have drifted away, but that if he had incited the crowd to throw the Japanese out, the movement would have been shut down. "You do not realize," he told Epstein, how important an instrument an easily learned song is." Many Chinese cannot read, but "the song carries resistance from mouth to mouth."

Liu wrote about gender issues, and during the 1930s he contributed articles to leading women's magazines.

On 7 July 1937, Liu was a witness to the Japanese attack on the Marco Polo Bridge.

After the outbreak of the Second Sino-Japanese War in August 1937, Liu continued to work with the YMCA Soldier Relief Board to provide shelter and relief for wounded soldiers. For a while the Second United Front provided a truce between the Chinese Communist Party (CCP) and Kuomintang (KMT), but by the summer of 1939, the united front was breaking down. While the CCP were enthusiastic about music as a way to mobilize popular support, the KMT was suspicious that popular cultural activities were being manipulated to CCP advantage. The Soldier Relief Board and Liu's team of relief workers were in Changsha, Hunan, when the local Nationalist military burned the town to prevent it from falling into the hands of an anticipated Japanese advance which never materialized. Liu's group managed to save the YMCA building and to evacuate many of the wounded soldiers, but determined it would be safer to move on to Zhejiang.

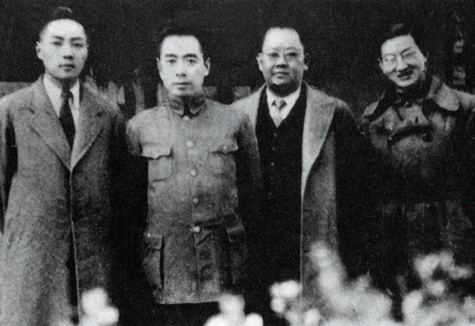
Zhou Enlai (second from the left) and Liu Liangmo (first from the right) in Jinhua in 1939

In Zhejiang, Liu tried to keep good relations with local Nationalist government and army, but when Zhou Enlai visited him, the military police became suspicious and raided Liu's relief camp. The CCP's New Fourth Army invited him to join their cultural work, but Liu feared the political control that the move would have required. Liu saw his Christian faith as more important than loyalty to either the GMD or the CCP. Liu set out for Shanghai to seek the support of Soong Ching-ling, the widow of Sun Yat-sen, who had become the protector of leftist cultural activities, but before he could reach her the Nationalist police put him under house arrest. Only the intervention of the American YMCA freed him. He soon left with his family for the United States and did not return to China for nearly ten years.

== In the United States, 1940–1949 ==
Mass singing continued to be a way for Liu to raise support for China. In the United States, he toured the country giving hundreds of speeches, singing and recording Chinese fighting songs and patriotic songs, and publishing articles in scores of American periodicals. He briefly attended Crozer Theological Seminary a Baptist institution outside Philadelphia. When he arrived in New York in 1940 he immediately organized a chorus for the Chinese Youth Club that sang for war rallies.

Liu also rallied support for China's war effort through the international network of progressive figures. Soon after he arrived in New York, Liu mentioned to a friend that he knew of the African American singer and political activist Paul Robeson and his early support for China, and said that he would like to meet him. The friend (perhaps Lin Yutang) contacted Robeson, who came within half an hour. Liu introduced Robeson to the concept of the mass singing movement, and a number of songs including March of the Volunteers (Chee lai). Chee lai resonated with Robeson, who viewed it as expressing the determination of oppressed people around the world, including Chinese and Blacks.

At a concert at New York's Lewisohn Stadium a few weeks later, Robeson sang Chee lai in what Liu described as "perfect Mandarin." Reportedly in communication with the original lyricist Tian Han, the pair translated the anthem into English. In early 1941 Liu and the Children's Chorus recorded an album of Chinese songs with Robeson for Keynote Records.

From 10 February 1941 through September 1956, the U.S. Federal Bureau of Investigation, the U.S. War Department, and the Chester and New York City Police Departments regularly surveilled Liu and monitored his activities.

Liu toured the country to raise money for United China Relief. and appeared onstage with such figures as Pearl S. Buck and Eleanor Roosevelt in a series of rallies which attracted thousands in New York and Philadelphia . He also appeared in places with a less high profile, such as Bedford, Trimble County, in the hills of Kentucky, where some 400 farmers contributed eggs, sorghum, chickens, turkeys, potatoes, apples, corn and home canned foods to be auctioned. Liu told reporters "These are the American people, and they are doing their best to help their own boys and the suffering people of the United Nations through the National War Fund."

During Lt. Gen. Joseph Stillwell's struggles with Chiang Kai-shek, who had demanded that the U.S. recall Stillwell, Liu advocated on behalf of Stillwell in the U.S. Between April and May 1942, Liu was a guest speaker for United China Relief meetings at the home of Stillwell's brother, Col. John Stillwell.

As he became more familiar with American society, Liu grew openly critical of its racism towards African-Americans and Asians. Liu linked the interests of the two non-white groups. He declared to students at Lincoln University in Philadelphia that "If we lick fascism and Japanese imperialism we lick Jim Crow and anti-Semitism at the same time." The editor of the Pittsburgh Courier, a newspaper with a primarily black readership, then asked Liu to become a regular contributor to the editorial page. Liu urged readers to start a write-in campaign to tell Congress to repeal the Chinese Exclusion Act and pass the anti-poll tax bill and the anti-lynching bill. Surveillance of Liu by U.S. authorities intensified after he began speaking in support of the rights of American Blacks.

Yet Liu was disappointed that some blacks were suspicious of Chinese. He explained to the Chinese Hand Laundry Alliance, another key progressive ally, that blacks were "treated poorly and often heard insulting words in Chinese restaurants." and their disappointment turned to anger. "We should understand that blacks and we Chinese are like each other," he continued, "we are the nations being discriminated against and oppressed....." When accusations of racism were made against a Chinese restaurant owner on the West Coast Liu urged his readers to report any such incidents to the Chinese consul. He pointed to the African American and Chinese soldiers who worked side by side building the Burma Road in China, declaring that these men "know that all are comrades and brothers." During Madme Chiang Kai-shek's visit to the United States in 1943, Liu was openly critical of the Nationalist government of her husband, even more so when she made remarks that seemed to disparage African Americans. By 1945 these incidents had made the Pittsburgh Courier's African American readers so distrustful of Chinese that the publisher discontinued Liu's connection with the paper.

In 1945 Liu addressed the Chinese Students' Christian Association, the oldest such group in North America, to attack the dictatorial rule of the Nationalists. Liu criticized censorship by the Nationalists, their economic policies which lead to stagnation and inflation, and what he described as Chiang Kai-shek's one-man rule. Liu urged Chinese to demand democracy.

Having been invited to attend the First National People's Political Consultative Conference and also at risk of deportation from the U.S., on August 1, 1949, Liu and his family left New York City for China.

== The New China ==
Following his return to China, Liu was a high-ranking cultural official for decades and represented the religious circles. Liu's political influence was facilitated by his speeches and writing, which were printed in influential publications including People's Daily.

In September 1949 Liu attended the People's Consultative Conference in Beijing, along with other left-liberal figures. Liu was among those suggesting that March of the Volunteers be made the new National Anthem. Liu supported and promoted the Three-Self Patriotic Movement.

Liu was on the rostrum for the proclamation of the People's Republic of China on October 1, 1949.

In July 1950, Liu, along with Y.T. Wu and other Christian leaders issued a statement, Ways for Chinese Christians to Contribute to Constructing the New China in which they called for Chinese Christians and churches to cut ties with foreign imperialists and support the Three-Self Patriotic Movement. Liu published articles in the Three-Self Patriotic Movement's journal, Tian Feng, such as one criticizing imperialism (May 19, 1951). The Shanghai YMCA Press published books by Liu explaining Mao Zedong's New Democracy and How America Uses Religion to Invade China. Especially after the Korean War started, Liu was well-regarded as a commentator on U.S. issues, including the experiences of Black Americans.

In 1950, Liu attended the second World Peace Congress in Warsaw.

During the Korean War, the U.S. government seized public and private Chinese properties in the United States, ended currency exchange with China, and prevented U.S. entities from funding cultural, religious, and educational institutions in China. The Chinese government responded with similar measures, including seizing church institutions that had previously been funded from the U.S. Liu was among the Chinese religious leaders who praised and sought to encourage support for these moves.

Over 1949–1950, Liu assisted in the publication of Shirley Graham Du Bois' biographies of George Washington Carver and Paul Robeson. In July 1951, the Three-Self Patriotic Movement sent Liu and a work team to the Shanghai headquarters of the Seventh-day Adventists, where they held three public accusation meetings. Liu prepared his work group by explaining that a successful meeting would use charges of "imperialism, bandits, and wicked tyrants" to "arouse the righteous indignation and accusations of Christians towards imperialism and bad elements in the churches." Liu explained the stages in which emotions would be handled: "first high tension, then moderate, then another of high tension... only so can the accusation meeting be a success." Before each meeting, Liu rehearsed the participants, reviewed the accusation speeches, and ordered the accusers to memorize them and to shed tears when talking about their sufferings. Participants were to shout anti- imperialist slogans and sing revolutionary songs.

In 1954 Liu attended the First National Chinese Christian Conference, held in Beijing.

Liu was one of the leaders of China's delegation to the December 1957 Afro-Asian Peoples' Solidarity Conference, along with Guo Moruo, Liu Ningyi, and Ji Chaoding.

As vice chair of the Returned Overseas Chinese Association, Liu condemned the 1966 anti-Chinese movement in Indonesia, which he described as part of an anti-communist conspiracy by U.S. imperialists.

Following the end of the Cultural Revolution, during which Christians and their churches were attacked, Liu held positions in the Chinese YMCA and the Shanghai government. In 1978 a forum to solicit views on amending the Constitution was held in Shanghai. Y.T. Wu, Liu's longtime colleague, was then in the hospital, but asked Liu to read the meeting his statement requesting that the article on freedom of religious belief be returned to the wording of the 1954 Constitution. The article was not changed at that time.

In 1982, Liu, then vice-chairman of the Shanghai Municipal Political Consultative Conference, submitted a photo to Jiefang Daily which he had taken in 1938 when he visited Nanjing to record the atrocities by the Japanese army. The photo was of a hospitalized little girl who had lost her arm. The girl, by then a school teacher, saw it and came to see Liu in Shanghai.

Liu died in 1988 in Shanghai.

== Selected publications ==
- ——; Klem, Peter; Modoi, Evelyn (1945). China Sings: Folk-Songs and Fighting Songs of China. New York: C. Fischer.
- —— (1936). 青年歌集 Qing nian ge ji (A collection of songs for youth). Shanghai: Qing nian xie hui xiao hui zu.
- —— (1950). 新民主主義學習手册 Xin minzhu zhuyi xuexi shouce (A New Democracy study handbook. Shanghai: Qing nian xie hui shu ju (YMCA Press).
- —— (1950), "Paul Robeson: The People's Singer", China Daily News, vol. July, ISBN 9780520243095, translated and reprinted in Judy Yung, Gordon Chang, and Him Mark Lai, eds., Chinese American Voices: From the Gold Rush to the Present (Berkeley: University of California Press, 2006), pp. 204– 208.
- —— (1951). 美國怎樣利用宗教侵畧中國 Meiguo zenyang liyong zongjiao qinlüe Zhongguo (How America uses religion to invade China). Shanghai: Qing nian xie hui shu ju (YMCA Press).
