= Philip Jaffe =

American businessman, editor and author

Philip Jacob Jaffe
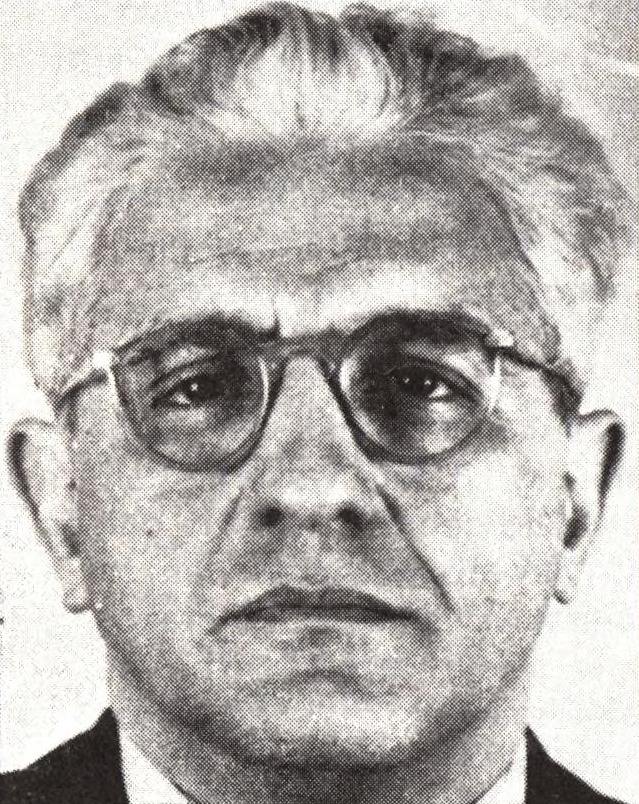
- Jaffe's FBI mugshot, 1945
- Born: 20 March 1895; Poltava, Ukraine, Russian Empire
- Died: 10 December 1980 (aged 85); New York City, US
- Education: CCNY, Columbia University
- Occupations: Businessman, editor, author
- Known for: Amerasia affair

Philip Jacob Jaffe (March 20, 1895 – December 10, 1980) was a communist American businessman, editor and author. He was born in Ukraine and moved to New York City as a child. He became the owner of a profitable greeting card company. In the 1930s Jaffe became interested in Communism and edited two journals associated with the Communist Party USA. He is known for the 1945 Amerasia affair, in which the FBI found classified documents in the offices of his Amerasia magazine that had been given to him by State Department employee John S. Service. He received a minimal sentence due to OSS/FBI bungling of the investigation, but there were continued reviews of the affair by Congress into the 1950s. He later wrote about the rise and decline of the Communist Party in the USA.

== Career ==
=== Background ===
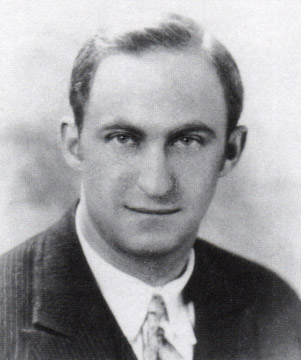
Jay Lovestone (circa 1917) met young Jaffe in New York

Philip Jaffe was born in Mogileb near Poltava, Russian Empire on March 20, 1895. His father, Morris Jaffe, was a Russian-speaking Jewish lumberjack. Morris moved to the United States in 1904, temporarily leaving his family in Ekaterinoslav, where Philip attended a Jewish school and experienced a pogrom in 1905. His father, who had found work as a plasterer, sent for Philip and his mother to join him on the Lower East Side of Manhattan in New York City. Jaffe reached New York City in 1906 with his mother and three younger siblings. Jaffe attended Townsend Harris Hall, a very selective three-year secondary school, graduating in 1913. Jaffe studied electrical engineering at Brooklyn Polytechnic Institute for a year, then in 1914 transferred to City College of New York. He met Jay Lovestone, who would become General Secretary of the Communist Party USA (CPUSA). He was suspended for low grades, and for a short period studied at Columbia University.

=== Career ===
After dropping out of university, Jaffe worked for the garment industry Board of Control, then found work as a messenger for Alexander Newmark, who ran a classified advertisement agency and was active in the Socialist Party. In 1915 Jaffe joined the Socialist Party of America. Philip was briefly in the United States Army in October–November 1918. After being discharged he enrolled at Columbia again, studying during the day and continuing to work for Newmark at night. He earned a bachelor's degree at Columbia in 1920 and a master's in English literature in 1921. He had been offered a teaching position at the University of Wisconsin when Agnes relapsed and had to return to the sanatorium. Jaffe went back into business and entered a partnership with Wallace Brown, a stationery distributor. Jaffe became a US citizen on May 4, 1923. The partners fell out, and Jaffe took full control of the Wallace Brown Corporation. It diversified into selling greeting cards via mail order and using housewives to sell the cards door to door, and by the early 1930s was a profitable business.

=== Early political activity ===
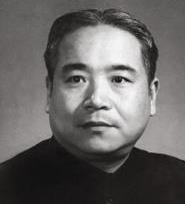
Chi Ch'ao-ting introduced Jaffe to Communism and co-edited China Today

In 1929 Jaffe met Chi Ch'ao-ting (Ji Chaoding), who had married Jaffe's cousin, Harriet Levine, in 1927. Chi had just returned from Moscow, where he had been a translator for the Chinese delegation to the 6th congress of the Communist International. He had settled in New York City and had joined the Chinese Bureau of the CPUSA. Chi introduced Jaffe to communism and sparked his interest in China. Jaffe joined the International Labor Defense (ILD) in 1931 at Chi's urging, and contributed to the ILD journal Labor Defender. During the 1930s Chi Ch'ao-ting was a graduate student at Columbia University, studying economics. He was influenced by the German Communist emigre Karl August Wittfogel. Chi's 1936 dissertation on Key Economic Areas in Chinese History won the Seligman Economics Prize.

From 1933 until 1945 Jaffe was known as president of a successful company who was also an editor, lecturer, member of the board of various companies and respected by academics and government officials. He was prominent in left-wing political circles and associated with the CPUSA although never a member. He was a close friend of Communists such as the party leader Earl Browder, and linked with groups connected to the CPUSA such as the China Aid Society, the League of Soviet American Friendship, and the American Friends of the Chinese People (AFCP).

Jaffe attended the first meeting of the AFCP in May 1933. He later wrote, "Except for me, all those present were obviously Communist Party members. Nevertheless, or perhaps because of this, soon after the meeting I became the Executive Secretary ... and editor of its organ China Today." According to Jaffe, from its first publication dated September 7, 1933, the magazine consisted mainly of "rewrites of material (we) received on rice paper from the Chinese Communist Party underground in Shanghai." The three editors were Jaffe, who wrote under the pseudonym J.W. Phillips, Chi Ch'ao-ting, who mainly used the name Hansu Chan, and T. A. Bisson, (Note: T. A. Bisson was later accused of being a Soviet spy while working at the US Board of Economic Warfare.) who wrote as Frederick Spencer. Chi was a friend of K. P. Chen and through him later gained inside information about the Kuomintang. Jaffe collaborated with his friend Frederick Vanderbilt Field (Note: Frederick Vanderbilt Field, scion of several leading American families, was a dedicated Communist. He was once called "the Reds' pet blueblood." He worked for the Institute of Pacific Relations, which after World War II was called an umbrella for subversives by Congressional investigators.) to set up the journal Amerasia in 1937 as a more moderate and less openly Communist successor to China Today. However, Jaffe continued to present the Communist party line in Amerasia.

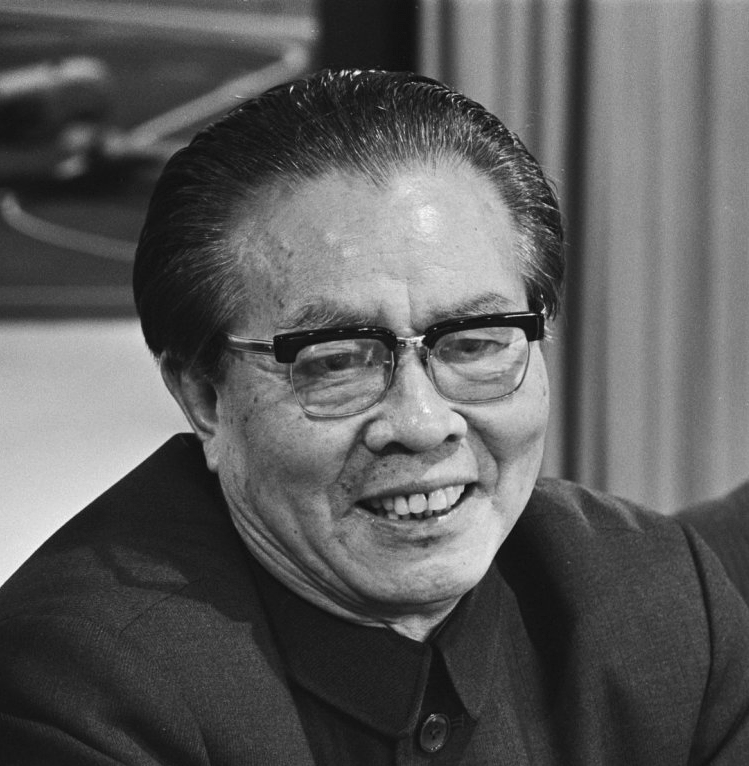
Huang Hua interpreted for Jaffe in his meetings with Mao Zedong, Zhu De and Zhou Enlai

After launching Amerasia, in April 1937 Jaffe and his wife left for a four-month visit to the Far East. In Beijing they connected with T.A. Bisson, who had won a Rockefeller Foundation Fellowship to study there. They found a small group of Westerners interested in the Chinese Communist movement including Edgar Snow and his wife Helen (Peggy), Owen Lattimore and Karl August Wittfogel. Snow had arranged for Lattimore, Bisson and Wittfogel to visit Yan'an, headquarters of the Communists. (Note: In the 1950s Edgar Snow's name was brought up in congressional hearings in connection with the trip to Yan'an in 1937, but Snow was not asked to testify.) Wittfogel dropped out of the expedition and the Jaffes replaced him, leaving on May 17, 1937. The Jaffe party arrived in Yan'an in mid-June in a 1924 Chevrolet with a Scandinavian driver. There they met Agnes Smedley and Peggy Snow, and talked with the Communist party leaders Mao Zedong, Zhu De and Zhou Enlai. Huang Hua, who interpreted for them, was later the Chinese Foreign Minister. Jaffe probed Mao's commitment and fidelity to the party line. His report on the visit appeared in The New Masses, the CPUSA organ.

In August 1940 Amerasia published an article by Lattimore in which he predicted that China would win the Sino-Japanese War and would evict the colonial powers from their concessions in China. In turn Indochina, Indonesia, Malaya and India would seek and gain independence from the European colonial powers. Lattimore concluded, "What America must decide is whether to back a Japan that is bound to lose, or a China that is bound to win."

=== Amerasia affair ===
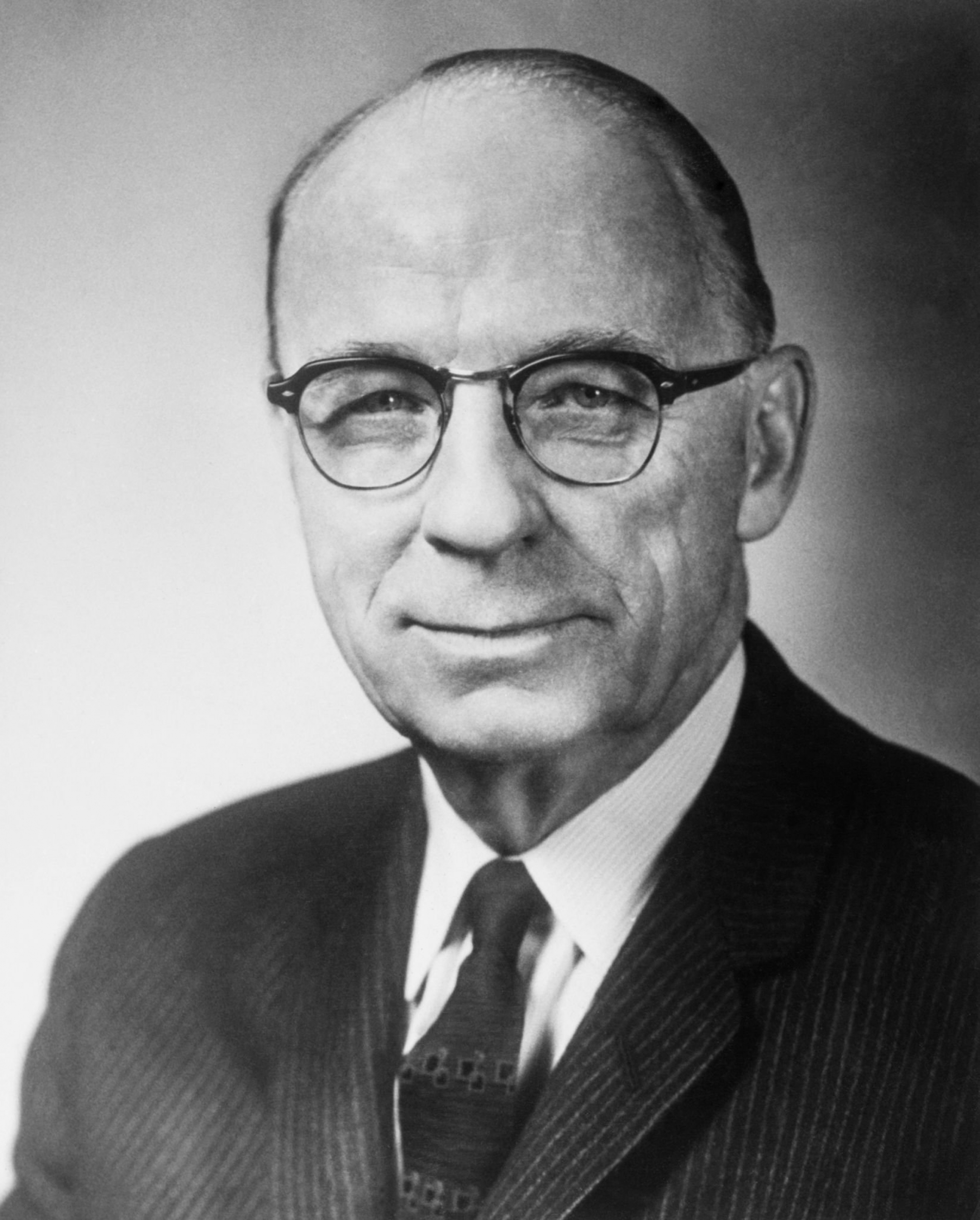
Bourke B. Hickenlooper claimed there was a cover-up with Amerasia.

By 1945 Amerasia had a circulation of about 2,000 and was published on an irregular schedule. Roughly one third of the copies went to government offices. In 1945 an official noticed a long and almost verbatim quote in Amerasia from a secret Office of Strategic Services (OSS) report. In March 1945 the OSS sent agents to search the Amerasia office for documents. Five OSS agents burgled the office, found hundreds of stolen government documents and took samples. Most of the documents seemed to have come via the United States Department of State. When the OSS told the State Department of their findings, they called in the Federal Bureau of Investigation (FBI), which began an investigation in mid-March.

The FBI watched Jaffe and the Amerasia office for nearly three months. The voluminous FBI reports on the surveillance include data from wiretaps, hidden microphones and physical observations. On April 20, 1945, John S. Service of the State Department gave Jaffe a document at the Statler Hotel in Washington, D.C. The FBI report of their hidden microphone recording of this meeting said, "Service ... apparently gave Jaffe a document which dealt with matters the [Nationalist] Chinese had furnished to the United States government in confidence. Service stated that the person with whom he was associated in China would 'get his neck pretty badly wrung' if the information got out." Service later said he thought Jaffe was just a journalist, and let him have some memos he had written while in China about the Kuomintang forces and the Communists.

On June 6, 1945, FBI agents arrested Jaffe, his co-editor Kate Louise Mitchell, the journalist Mark Gayn, John Service and Emmanuel Sigurd Larsen of the State Department, and Andrew Roth of the Office of Naval Intelligence, and seized the Amerasia papers, including many government documents. The charge was espionage based on possession of classified government documents concerning US policy in China. However, the OSS had burgled the Amerasia office and the homes of several of the accused, so the evidence was tainted. A grand jury decided there was insufficient basis for criminal charges against Mitchell, Gayn and Service. (Note: John S. Service continued to be employed by the State Department for five years after the Amerasia affair.) The jury said the papers Service had given to Jaffe were not classified. Jaffe, Roth and Larsen were indicted for stealing, receiving or concealing Government documents, but not for espionage. The court hearing was held quietly on a Saturday morning. Jaffe pleaded guilty and was fined $2,500, an amount he paid immediately. Larsen was later fined $500, which was paid by Jaffe, and the charges against Roth were dropped.

The Amerasia case was reviewed in 1946 by a House Judiciary subcommittee chaired by representative Sam Hobbs. The FBI and Department of Justice tried to cover up the mistakes which had led to most charges being dropped. Senator Joseph McCarthy revived interest in the case as part of his campaign against Communists in the State Department. In 1950 the case was investigated by the Senate Foreign Relations Subcommittee on the Investigation of Loyalty of State Department Employees. Republican Senators including Bourke B. Hickenlooper claimed that the Administration had been covering up the Amerasia case, and the documents contained important secret information. Assistant Attorney General James M. Mclnerney downplayed their importance and said "Hickenlooper is '100% wrong.'". The records were declassified and the Justice Department delivered 1,260 documents to the Senate Internal Security Subcommittee in 1956 and 1957.

=== Later years ===
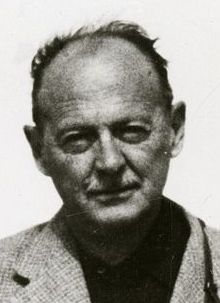
Owen Lattimore helped arrange the 1937 trip to Yan'an

Jaffe and Field were among the founders of the Committee for a Democratic Far Eastern Policy in August 1945, which opposed the policy of Harry S. Truman's administration to support Chiang Kai-shek and his Kuomintang government in China. Amerasia, losing money and subject to mounting attacks by anti-communist agitators, closed down in 1947. The final issue consisted entirely of Jaffe's article America: The Uneasy Victor. Jaffe said he now supported Truman for President, alienating many former friends who followed the CPUSA line and supported Henry A. Wallace. Jaffe's company would gross $5–6 million per year at its peak in the late 1940s and early 1950s. In the late 1940s both Jaffe and Field severed their connections with the CPUSA and its associated organizations.

In 1947 his translation of Chiang Kai-shek's manifesto, China's Destiny was published together with his own critical commentary on the text.

In 1950, when asked in a congressional hearing whether he had traveled to China and had known Owen Lattimore and other figures, Jaffe claimed his privilege under the Fifth Amendment and was cited for contempt. During the peak of McCarthyism in 1951–52 the Tydings Committee subpoenaed Jaffe, and subsequently charged him with contempt of Congress, but Jaffe avoided any further punishment. Service asked that the Tydings hearings be open to the press and public. He told the committee in detail of his friendly relations with Jaffe, and said he had loaned Jaffe nine or ten memos he had written which were "factual in nature and did not contain discussion of United States political or military policy." He said he had probably been indiscreet but was certainly not guilty of treason, and was neither a Communist nor a Communist sympathizer.

After his acquittal by the Tydings committee the FBI interviewed Jaffe at length four times. On September 26, 1954, the day before a grand jury investigating Field was due to adjourn after finding nothing significant, Walter Winchell claimed on the radio that Jaffe had made "a sensational statement to the FBI." Jaffe had in fact said nothing, but the grand jury voted to indict Field the next day.

Although the Amerasia case remained controversial in the academic world and in politics, Jaffe gradually faded from public attention. Browder, the Jaffes and some others continued to meet and discuss politics in a group called the "Koffee Klatsch" until Browder's death in 1973. Jaffe wrote a book, The Rise and Fall of American Communism (1975), in which he drew on his access through Browder to the party's internal discussions and memos. He wrote an autobiography, "Odyssey of a Fellow Traveler," completed in 1978 but never published. Jaffe wrote in it, "As I 'look back on us', I recognize that many still romanticize the radicalism of the thirties without acknowledging its absurdities, illusions and self-deceptions."

== Private life and death ==
In 1918, Jaffe married Agnes Newmark (born September 25, 1898). Agnes was found to have tuberculosis a few months after the wedding, and spent three years in a sanitarium. They had no children.

Philip Jaffe died age 85 on December 10, 1980, in New York City.

== Legacy ==
Jaffe assembled a large collection of material about communism, civil rights, pacifist movements, labor, and the Third World. He was particularly interested in Communism in the Soviet Union, China, India, Southeast Asia and the United States. 15,000 items were acquired by the Harry Ransom Center of the University of Texas at Austin in 1960. Emory University in Atlanta holds his main archive. York University of Toronto, Canada, acquired material from Jaffe's collection in 1970. This consists of minutes of the Political Committee, Central Executive Committee, and Secretariat of the Workers' (Communist) Party of the United States for 1926–29.

== Bibliography ==
=== Articles ===
- “The Rise and Fall of Earl Browder”. Survey (Spring 1972), pp. 14–65.
- “Economic Provincialism and American Far Eastern Policy”. Science & Society, Vol. 5, No. 4 (Fall 1941), pp. 289–309.

=== Books ===
- Discussion of a Plan for an American Loan to Industrialize China. New York: Amerasia, 1938. 8 pages.
- New Frontiers in Asia: A Challenge to the West. New York: A. A. Knopf, 1945. 388 pages.
  - Reprinted by Read Books, 2007. ISBN 140674073X
- The Rise and Fall of American Communism. Horizon Press, 1975. ISBN 978-0818016042. 236 pages.
- The Amerasia Case from 1945 to the Present. New York: Philip J. Jaffe, 1979. 64 pages.

=== Contributions ===
- Philip Jaffe (1947). "Notes and commentary". China's Destiny & Chinese Economic Theory. By Chiang Kai-shek. London: D. Dobson.

== External sources ==
- Belknap, Michal (April 1996), "Review of Klehr, Harvey; Radosh, Ronald, The Amerasia Spy Case: Prelude to McCarthyism", H-Law, H-Net Reviews
- "The Strange Case of Amerasia", TIME Magazine, June 12, 1950
- Chen, Jinxing (2009), "Jaffe, Philip Jacob 1895–1980", in Song, Yi (ed.), Encyclopedia of Chinese-American Relations, Jefferson, NC: McFarland, ISBN 978-0-7864-9164-3
- Evans, M. Stanton (2009), Blacklisted by History: The Untold Story of Senator Joe McCarthy and His Fight Against America's Enemies, Three Rivers Press, ISBN 978-1-4000-8106-6
- Feldman, Paul (1975-09-01), "The Rise and Fall of American Communism, by Philip J. Jaffe", Commentary
- Garner, Karen (2009-06-01), Precious Fire: Maud Russell and the Chinese Revolution, Univ of Massachusetts Press, ISBN 978-1-55849-754-2
- Giblin, James Cross (2009-12-14), The Rise and Fall of Senator Joe McCarthy, Houghton Mifflin Harcourt, ISBN 978-0-547-44318-8
- Gray, Timothy (2006-10-01), Gary Snyder and the Pacific Rim: Creating Countercultural Community, University of Iowa Press, ISBN 978-1-58729-666-6
- Hamilton, John Maxwell (2003), Edgar Snow: A Biography, LSU Press, ISBN 978-0-8071-2912-8
- Jaffe, Philip (October 12, 1937), "China's Communists Told Me: A Journey to the Home of the Famous New Eighth Route Army", New Masses
- Klehr, Harvey; Radosh, Ronald (1996), The Amerasia Spy Case: Prelude to McCarthyism, Chapel Hill: The University of North Carolina Press, ISBN 978-0-8078-2245-6
- Nemy, Enid (February 7, 2000), "Frederick Vanderbilt Field, Wealthy Leftist, Dies at 94", The New York Times
- Newman, Robert P. (1992), Owen Lattimore and the "loss" of China, University of California Press, ISBN 978-0-520-07388-3
- Nichols, Patrick (2008), "The Life And Works Of Philip J. Jaffe: A Foreigner's Foray Into Chinese Communism]" (PDF), Emory Endeavors in World History, 2 Includes quotations from Jaffe's The Amerasia Case From 1945 to the Present (1979)
- Philip J. Jaffe collection, York University
- Philip J. Jaffe papers, 1936–1980, Emory University, 2007-12-21
- "Records of the Committee on the Judiciary and Related Committees, 1816–1968", Guide to the Records of the U.S. Senate at the National Archives (Record Group 46), Center for Legislative Archives, archived from the original on 2017-04-08
- Ryskind, Allan (2015-01-05), Hollywood Traitors: Blacklisted Screenwriters Ð Agents of Stalin, Allies of Hitler, Regnery Publishing, Incorporated, An Eagle Publishing Company, ISBN 978-1-62157-233-6
- Smith, Ivian C.; West, Nigel (2012), Historical Dictionary of Chinese Intelligence, Scarecrow Press, ISBN 978-0-8108-7174-8
- Song, Yuwu (2006-07-18), Encyclopedia of Chinese-American Relations, McFarland, ISBN 978-0-7864-9164-3
- The Philip J. Jaffe Collection of Leftist Literature, Harry Ransom Center
- US Senate Subcommittee on the Investigation of Loyalty of State Department Employees (Report of), vol. 2, appendix, 1950
- US Senate 81st Congress (September 13, 1950), Senate Report No. 2570: Citing Philip Jacob Jaffe For Contempt Of The Senate
