= Liu Ningyi =

Chinese politician

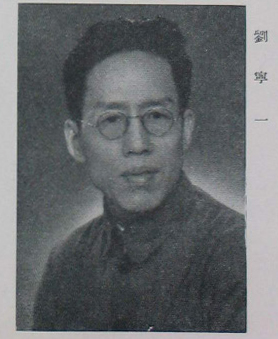
Liu Ningyi

Liu Ningyi (Chinese: 刘宁一; December, 1907 – February 15, 1994) was a Chinese politician, who served as the vice chairperson of the Standing Committee of the National People's Congress. He was one of the leaders of China's delegation to the December 1957 Afro-Asian Peoples' Solidarity Conference, along with Liu Liangmo, Guo Moruo, and Ji Chaoding.
