= China Aid Society =

- Formation: 1937
- Founded at: Los Angeles, California, US
- Legal status: Defunct
- Purpose: Support refugees from China; Resist Japanese invasion

The China Aid Society was organized by a group of progressive Koreans in the United States after Japan invaded China in 1937. It advocated anti-Japanese political action in the US, helped refugees from the Japanese invasion and supported Korean guerrilla action in China.

== History ==
The society, later renamed the Society for Aid to the Korean Volunteer Corps in China, was founded in 1937. It protested the Japanese military action and advocated anti-Japanese political activity in the US. The China Aid Society helped Chinese refugees from the Japanese invasion and supported Korean guerrilla action in China against the Japanese. The society changed its name to the Korean Volunteers Corps Aid Society in February 1941. It was not run by the Communist Party USA, but supported the position of the Russian and Chinese Communists.

== Prominent members ==
The Methodist clergyman Lee Kyungsun headed the China Aid Society, Korean Volunteers Corps Aid Society in China and American Branch of the Korean National Revolutionary Party, organizations that were in favor of armed action. He later joined the American Communist Party, and in 1949 returned to North Korea. The socialist Byun Jun-ho was one of the founders of the China Aid Society, and represented the New York branch at the Korean National Association. Byun Jun-ho dedicated himself to the cause of armed resistance after the Korean Volunteers Corps Aid Society was established in 1940 in China, and from 1943 onward chaired the North America branch of the Korean National Revolutionary Party.

Irvin E. Cline was secretary of the China Aid Society in Los Angeles. He was among those who petitioned Mexican president Lázaro Cárdenas to admit the exiled Japanese Marxist theatre director Seki Sano. The mathematician Norbert Wiener became a member of the China Aid Society. He was interested in placing scholars such as Yuk-Wing Lee who had lost their positions. The businessman and left-wing journal editor Philip Jaffe was also associated with the society. Harold Winston Rhodes was president of the China Aid Society in New Zealand during the war.

== Sources ==
- Barrowman, Rachel (1998), "Rhodes, Harold Winston", Dictionary of New Zealand Biography, vol. 4
- Bong Youn Choy (1979), Koreans in America, Nelson-Hall, ISBN 978-0-88229-352-3
- Choegiyoung (2004), 1930-40 America's Christian socialism and of nationalist movement, Korea Institute of Christian history
- Independence and socialism of the Korean American 卞 俊 鎬, Korea Society for modern history, 2015
- McCavitt, Mary Jane (September 2, 2009), Guide to the Papers of Norbert Wiener (PDF), Massachusetts Institute of Technology Libraries, archived from the original (PDF) on November 12, 2015
- Masani, Pesi R. (2012-12-06), Norbert Wiener 1894–1964, Birkhäuser, ISBN 978-3-0348-9252-0
- Philip J. Jaffe papers, 1936-1980, Emory University, 21 December 2007
- Tanaka, Michiko (Spring 1994), "Seki Sano and Popular Political and Social Theatre in Latin America", Latin American Theatre Review, archived from the original on 2016-04-01
