= Ji Chaoding =

Chinese economist and political activist

Ji Chaoding Chi Ch'ao-ting
- 冀朝鼎
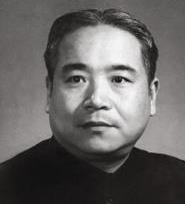
- Ji c.1950
- Born: October 9, 1903; Fenyang, Shanxi, Great Qing
- Died: August 9, 1963 (aged 59); Beijing, People's Republic of China
- Other names: "Richard Doonping" "Hansu Chan"
- Spouse(s): Harriet Levine Chi; Luo Jingyi
- Parent: Ji Gongquan (father)
- Relatives: Ji Chaoli (brother); Ji Chaozhu (brother)

Academic background
- Education: Tsinghua University; University of Chicago; Sun Yat-sen University; Columbia University

Academic work
- Discipline: Economics, history
- Sub-discipline: Chinese history
- Institutions: Institute of Pacific Relations, Ministry of Foreign Affairs

Chinese name
- Chinese: 冀朝鼎
Transcriptions
Standard Mandarin
- Hanyu Pinyin: Jì Cháodǐng
- Wade–Giles: Chi Ch'ao-ting
- IPA: [tɕî ʈʂʰǎʊtìŋ]

Ji Chaoding (Chinese: 冀朝鼎; Wade–Giles: Chi Ch'ao-ting; 1903–1963) was a Chinese economist, communist activist, and spy. His book Key Economic Areas in Chinese History (1936) influenced the conceptualization of Chinese history in Europe by emphasizing geographic and economic factors as the basis of dynastic power.

Ji was educated at Tsinghua University in China, then in the United States at University of Chicago and Columbia University. He became a member of the Communist Party of the United States (CPUSA) and secretly joined the Chinese Communist Party (CCP). As an underground party member, he was on the staff of the Institute of Pacific Relations in the 1930s before returning to China in 1939. From the West, he worked as a spy, providing intelligence directly to Zhou Enlai. He became a trusted adviser to the Ministry of Finance in the wartime Nationalist government but remained in China as a well-placed official in the new government of the People's Republic of China after 1949. Only after his death was his long-time Party membership, and 20-year career as a spy for the communist faction acknowledged.

Joseph Needham, author of Science and Civilisation in China, called Ji a "learned and brilliant writer" and Key Areas "perhaps the most outstanding book on the development of Chinese history among Western books in those days."

== Family background ==
The Ji family was prominent in Shanxi education and politics. Chaoding's grandfather was a landlord who had a reputation for treating tenants honestly and supplying grain to the poor in times of shortage. His father, Ji Gongquan (冀貢泉; 1882–1967) studied law in Japan, but when the Republican Revolution of 1911 broke out and his government scholarship was suspended, he returned to China rather than accept Japanese government support.

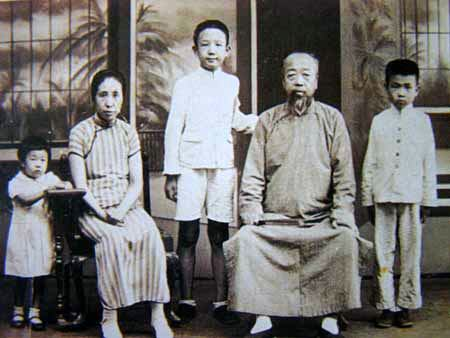
Ji Gongquan and his family, early 20th century. Ji Qing (l), Chaoli (c), Chaozhu (r).

He became friends with Lu Xun, with whom he shared many progressive views. Ji Gongquan told his son Ji Chaozhu that he then calculated that "if I were to join the 'Preserve the Empire Party' I might lose face. If I were to join the Revolutionary Party I might lose my head. I decided I was wisest to keep both." He became education commissioner in the 1920s for the new Shanxi provincial government of Yan Xishan, but when he was ordered to open fire on student demonstrators, he resigned and moved his family from the capital back to Fenyang. Ji Chaoding had two younger brothers, Ji Chaoli (冀朝理, better known as Chao-Li Chi) and Ji Chaozhu (born 1929), who became a highly placed translator for the Ministry of Foreign Affairs after 1949, and a younger sister, Ji Qing (冀青).

== Education and early career ==
In 1916 Ji Chaoding entered Tsinghua University, a school supported by funds from the Boxer Indemnity and whose classes were taught largely in English. In the aftermath of the 1919 May Fourth Movement, an awakening of patriotic spirit, Ji Chaoding led radical nationalist activities along with classmates Luo Longji and Wang Zaoshi. After graduating in 1924 he went to the United States to study on the Boxer Indemnity Scholarship Program. He enrolled at the University of Chicago. While there he was president of the Chicago Chinese Student Association, and worked with the American Anti-Imperialist League. In 1926 Ji joined the Communist Party of the United States (CPUSA). The Party had a keen interest in global communism, and established a Chinese Bureau to supervise students from China. At that time, the newly formed CCP was in a United Front alliance with the Nationalist Party of Sun Yat-sen, who was popular among Chinese Americans, and Ji developed a national reputation as a public speaker able to rouse support for China with his anti-imperialist speeches to local overseas Chinese groups in Chinese or to leftist comrades in English. In 1926, Ji and several of his Tsinghua friends denounced American supporters of the Nationalists and secretly joined the CCP. Their membership was kept secret in order to avoid surveillance or deportation, to allow them to work in Chinese American communities where the Nationalists were strong, and to keep their options open when they returned to China.

In the winter of 1926, on the orders of the Chinese Bureau, Ji sailed to Europe to attend the League Against Imperialism, organized in Brussels for colonialized peoples by the Communist International (Comintern) agent Willi Munzenberg. In 1927, Ji married Harriet Levine in Paris, whom he had met on the boat to Europe. The Chinese Bureau of the CPUSA ordered Ji and a group of students back to China to take part in the revolution, but White Terror led by Chiang Kai-shek ended the First United Front, and the group went to Moscow instead.

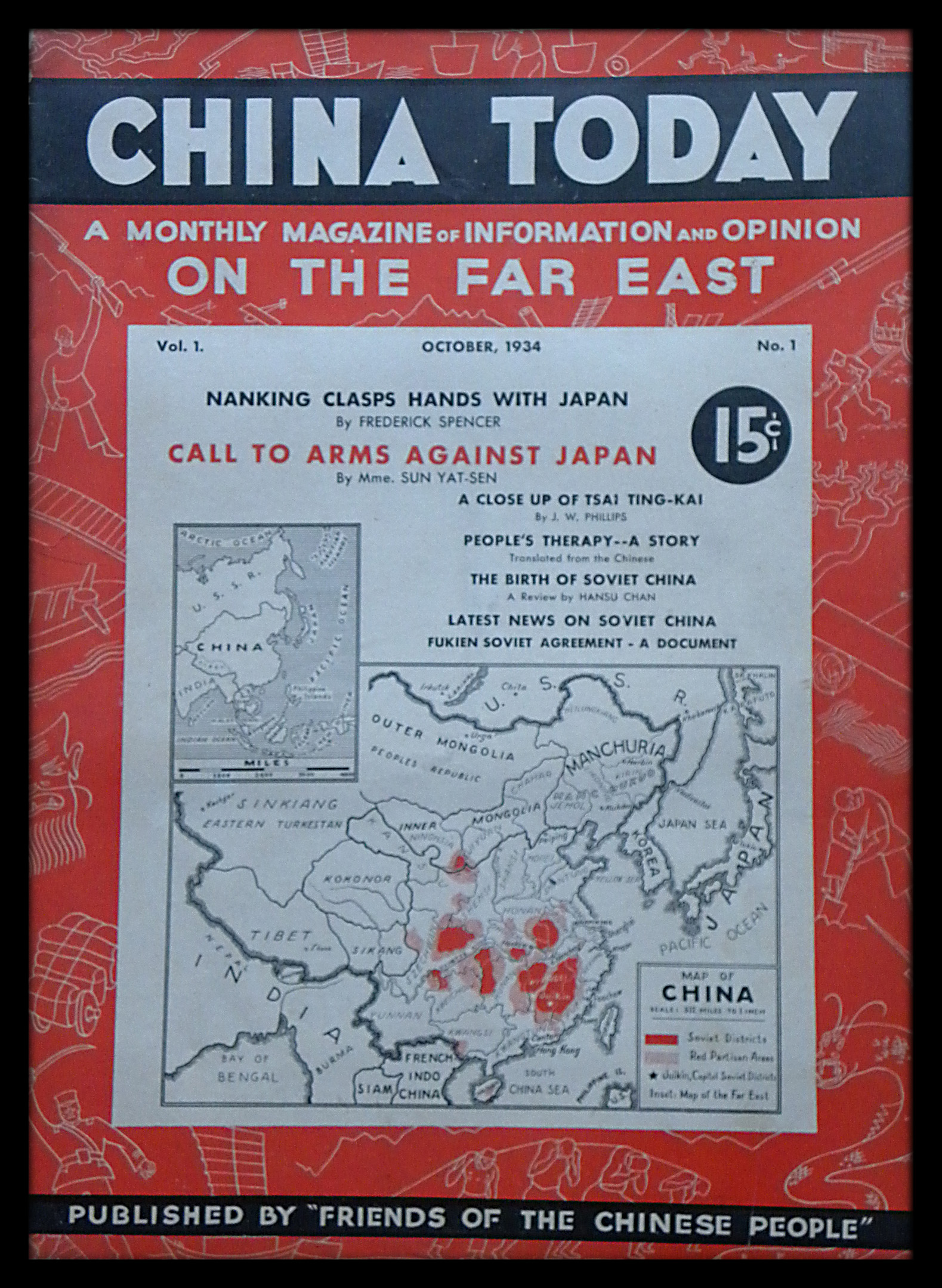
China Today

There Ji studied at Sun Yat-sen University, which had been founded to train Chinese students in revolution, and acted as interpreter for the Chinese communists who had fled China. He attended the Sixth Congress of the Communist International, and was one of the secretaries to Deng Zhongxia, China's delegate. William Z. Foster, an American delegate to the Congress, suggested that Ji not return to China but rather should return to the United States to publish a newspaper, a suggestion which Ji accepted.

In 1929, in Frankfurt, Germany, Ji met the economic historian Karl Wittfogel, then a member of the German Communist Party. Ji was deeply influenced by Wittfogel's Marxist analysis, which used geography and economics to analyze the development of China's political system. Wittfogel argued that imperial despotism arose from control of waterways, which gave the ruling dynasty the ability to extract grain and gather tax revenue.

When Ji returned to New York for graduate study in economics at Columbia University, he joined the central committee of the CPUSA Chinese Bureau, and wrote a series of articles for the Daily Worker under the name Richard Doonping. Ji's wife, Harriet, was a cousin of Philip Jaffe, a New York communist who urged Ji to join International Labor Defense, a radical labor group. Ji and Jaffe formed the American Friends of the Chinese People. They both wrote under pseudonyms for China Today, a magazine sponsored by CPUSA. Ji also appeared on Broadway in the Soviet writer Sergei Tretyakov's play Roar, China!.

== Wartime activities ==
In 1937, Ji, Jaffe and their group decided that China Today lacked the academic stature to be convincing to influential Americans. Instead, Jaffe, with the financial support of Frederick Vanderbilt Field, an open member of the CPUSA and secretary of the American Council of the Institute of Pacific Relations, founded a new journal, Amerasia. Ji served on the editorial board along with many scholars of less radical politics, as well as Chen Hansheng, another underground communist. Ji wrote a regular column, "Far Eastern Economic Notes," which used materials supplied from Party sources in China. In 1937 the IPR appointed Ji to its research staff, and in 1938 he traveled to China financed by a $90,000 grant from the Rockefeller Foundation to gather material for a study of China's wartime economic situation.

When Japanese troops were about to take Fengyang, Ji's father, Ji Gongquan, had assumed that the occupation authorities knew of his Japanese education. To avoid being coerced into joining the government, Ji Gongquan and his family fled to Hankow, which became the temporary national capital after the fall of Nanjing. Ji Gongquan became frustrated with Chiang Kai-shek, so Chaoding, who was then in China doing research, arranged the difficult passage through South China and Hanoi as the family made their way to New York. Chaoding had planned to go to the wartime communist capital in Yan'an, but Zhou Enlai asked him to instead accompany his family to the United States, where he could present sympathetic information while not revealing his political allegiance. Ji continued his work with the IPR and the magazine Amerasia.

Ji Chaoding returned to China in March 1940. He was a member of the government's financial mission to the U.S. Ji had been recruited in New York for this role in 1939 by the Shanghai banker K. P. Chen, who headed the Universal Trading Corporation (環球進出口公司), a quasi-government mechanism for loans from the U.S. Treasury Department to the Chongqing government. Ji and Chen returned to China through Burma, and Ji returned to New York in December, 1940. He became Secretary General of the Sino-American British Currency Stabilization Board, which took over from the Universal Trading Corporation. Again his boss was K.P. Chen. The American representative on the Board was Solomon Adler, who was later accused of being a Soviet agent. Ji traveled for the Board to Shanghai and Chongqing in July 1941.

Ji accepted a position in the wartime government in Chongqing, where he lived in the same rooming-house as Adler. One senior Nationalist Party official, Chen Lifu, later complained that the intelligence agencies knew of Ji's communist connections but that Finance Minister H.H. Kung trusted Ji because they were from the same province and Kung respected Ji's father. The next Finance Minister, T. V. Soong, Chen continued, was American trained and could not speak Chinese well. Soong and Ji got along because they both had a better command of English than Chinese, Chen charged, and that Ji fed damaging policies to both Kung and Soong, but Chiang Kai-shek trusted and defended them (in Kung's case partly because Kung was married to Chiang Kai-shek wife Soong Mei-ling's sister Soong Ai-ling). Ji Chaozhu, Ji's brother, recalled that Kung had once demanded" "Chaoding, tell the truth. Are you a Communist?" Knowing that a Communist might be tortured or executed, Chaoding replied, "Uncle, I have followed you these many years... Do I look like a Communist to you?"

Ji was one of the most effective members of the Chinese delegation at the Bretton Woods conference. He served there as Kung's secretary.

When the war ended, Ji's wife and two children came to China for the first time. The couple divorced, however, since Ji planned to stay in China, where Harriet did not want to remain. Ji traveled to Australia in 1948 as an advisor to the Nationalist delegation at the United Nations Economic Council, and on his return to China was made economic advisor to Nationalist General Fu Zuoyi, a fellow Shanxi native. Ji and his father were among the intellectuals who persuaded Fu to peacefully surrender the city of Beijing to the communist armies. Ji met with Fu at their Beijing home as part of the ultimately successful effort.

After H.H. Kung left government, Ji retained a research position at the Central Bank of China due to Ji's good ties with the new minister of finance, Yu Hongjun.

After 1949, Ji Gongquan continued his national and provincial educational and legal activities under the new government.

== Career in the People's Republic of China ==
On the eve of the Chinese Communist Revolution in 1949, Ji became director of the research department of the People's Bank, then went with the revolutionary armies to Shanghai, where he became assistant general manager of the Bank of China. When the new government was declared in October, although his relation with the Communist Party was not known, he was put in charge of foreign capital enterprises under the Government Administration Council. In the 1950s, he represented China on trade and commercial missions. Domestically, he was a member of the Chinese People's Political Consultative Conference.

The new government debated economic policy, especially foreign trade. Ji favored trade with Western Europe and foreign investment, one of the first in the government to do so, because he believed that China needed Western technology in order to develop. But he also insisted that this foreign trade should be balanced, adding that Beijing would have to conduct marketing efforts to promote Chinese goods abroad. Some criticized him for this openness to the West and for his American education and contacts, saying that he "drank too much American water." His brother, Chaoli, later commented that it was just as well that Chaoding was divorced from his wife, Harriet, for their marriage would have prevented him from playing a major role in the Party. He then married Luo Jingyi, another Chinese student activist who had joined the Communist Party in the United States in the 1920s.

Ji was one of the leaders of China's delegation to the December 1957 Afro-Asian Peoples' Solidarity Conference, along with Liu Liangmo, Liu Ningyi, and Guo Moruo.

Ji Chaoding died suddenly in 1963 of a cerebral hemorrhage. Joseph Needham organized a memorial service in Cambridge, England, and asked Owen Lattimore and other prominent leaders to speak. Lattimore wrote that Ji was "humane to the marrow of his bones." In Beijing, Ji was given a state service attended by Fu Zuoyi and high officials at which Zhou Enlai gave an encomium. Only after his death was Ji's long-time membership in the Chinese Communist Party officially acknowledged.

== Accusations ==
Only after his death were accusations of his membership in the Chinese Communist Party confirmed, but there had long been accusations of radical activity and association with communists. Investigations by the FBI summarized Ji's above-ground activities: From his days at the University of Chicago in the 1920s Ji had worked with and supported communists, and when he returned from China in the 1930s, he was introduced to the Institute of Pacific Relations. He worked on several projects with Philip Jaffe, most prominently on the publications China Today and Amerasia, both of which presented views of China which were sympathetic to the communists. In a 2009 article from the Chinese magazine 瞭望东方周刊 (Oriental Outlook), security official Luo Qingchang commented that Ji's proposal for issuing Chinese gold yuan led to an economic crisis that accelerated the fall of Kuomintang regime. Zhou Enlai also praised Ji, saying he "cannot be stained in mud, especially during the time of secret work".

In wartime Chongqing, Ji lived in the same boarding-house as John S. Service, an American Foreign Service Officer who was to leak State Department documents to Jaffe in the Amerasia documents case, and Solomon Adler, a friend of Ji's and official of the Treasury Department who was later accused of being a Soviet spy. The historian M. Stanton Evans wrote that this "trio" worked to undermine the government of Chiang Kai-shek. Chen Lifu told historian Stephen MacKinnon in 1992 that "it was Chen Hansheng and Ji Chaoding who were responsible [for the loss of the mainland]." MacKinnon concluded on the basis of his own research that Chen's charges were "at least partially justified." Ji worked in Washington during the war to undermine the reputation of the Nationalist government, though "how much Ji contributed to the failure of the Bank of China to control inflation during the civil war years is an open question."

== Key Economic Areas in Chinese History ==
Key Economic Areas in Chinese History, Ji Chaoding's doctoral dissertation at Columbia University, was published in London by the Institute of Pacific Relations in 1936 (it was not published in the United States until many years later). This was Ji's only book and it contained only 136 pages, but it had wide influence. A review of the 1964 reprint noted that "three decades after its completion and initial publication, this study still offers data and insights on the economic history of China not readily available elsewhere." The book identified key areas of grain production which, when controlled by a strong political power, permitted that power to dominate the rest of the country and enforce periods of stability.

Richard Louis Edmonds wrote in 2002 that Ji offered this theory as an "overlay" to the largely political, historical-oriented dynastic-cycle theory developed by traditional Chinese historians. Ji saw the lower Yellow River as the key economic area of the first period of unity and peace in the Qin and Han dynasties, but in the second such period, the Sui dynasty and the Tang dynasty, the key area shifted to the lower Yangzi basin, though linked to the Yellow River basin by the Grand Canal. During the third period, that is, the Yuan, Ming, and Qing dynasties or roughly the 13th–19th centuries, the lower Yangzi remained the key economic area, but the governments put much effort into developing the Hai River basin as a new area southeast of modern Beijing.

Karl Wittfogel, who was thanked by Ji in the preface, reviewed the book in the pages of Pacific Affairs in 1936, saying it was "an extremely important contribution to a real understanding of China's past and present." When Ji used geographical distribution of water control to explain the territorial form of China's political and economic development, Wittfogel continued, "the motives behind the economic political activities of China's dynasties thus appear much less humanitarian, but infinitely more realistic." Wittfogel did note that Ji's term "semi-feudalism" might better be called "Oriental Society" or "Oriental Absolutism."

Yet Ji was one of the few Chinese intellectuals to be inspired by Wittfogel's reading of Marx. Most Marxist intellectuals in China were uncomfortable with Marx's concept of an Asiatic Mode of Production, viewing it as too negative because it denied China's ability to develop independently. Ji and Wittfogel differed from Stalin and the Comintern, who insisted that all human history developed in the same stages whether in Europe or Asia, and who insisted that the Asiatic mode of production did not fit into this unilinear pattern. Ji did, however, follow Stalinist orthodoxy in labeling imperial China as "feudal."

Ji's innovative analysis of early Chinese civilization as arising from the interaction of settled agriculture and Inner Asian pastoral economies work influenced Owen Lattimore. One historian commented that it was "an irony" that neither Lattimore or his critics in the 1950s knew of Chi's Comintern connections. Karl Wittfogel, however, testified that when they had been in China together he had told Lattimore that Ji was a communist. Lattimore denied any knowledge to that effect.

== Selected works ==
- Doonping, Richard (pseud.) (1930). Militarist Wars and Revolution in China: A Marxian Analysis of the New Reactionary Civil War and Prospects of the Revolution in China. New York: Chinese Vanguard Publishers. The major part of this pamphlet was first published in a series of eight articles in the Daily Worker (Nov. 25 to Dec. 2, 1929).
- James, Maurice; Doonping, Richard (1932). Soviet China. Moscow; New York: Co-operative Publications Society of Foreign Workers in the U.S.S.R.
- —— (1934). "The Economic Basis of Unity and Division in Chinese History". Pacific Affairs. 7 (4): 386–394. doi:10.2307/2751366. JSTOR 2751366.
- —— (1936). Key Economic Areas in Chinese History, as Revealed in the Development of Public Works for Water-Control. London: G. Allen & Unwin, American Council, Institute of Pacific Relations.
- —— (1937). "China's Monetary Reform in Perspective". Far Eastern Survey. 6 (17): 189–196. doi:10.2307/3022704. JSTOR 3022704.
- —— (1939). Wartime Economic Development of China. New York: International Secretariat, Institute of Pacific Relations.
- —— (November 26, 1959). "清华甲子级访谈：冀朝鼎同志访问记录 (Qinghua jiazi ji fangtan: Ji Chaoding tongzhi jili (Interview with Comrade Ji Chaoding on Tsinghua Class of 1924)". Archived from the original on January 6, 2016.
