= Harold Winston Rhodes =

New Zealand professor, writer, and editor

Harold Winston Rhodes (1905–1987) was a New Zealand university professor of English, writer and editor. He was born in Melbourne, Victoria, Australia in 1905. In 1933, he joined the forerunner of the University of Canterbury as a lecturer, was made a professor in 1964 then retired in 1970.
