= Afro-Asian Peoples' Solidarity Conference, 1957 =

1957 political conference in Cairo, Egypt

Cairo Conference
- Host country: Egypt
- Dates: 26 December 1957 to 1 January 1958
- Cities: Cairo
- Participants: 607 representatives
- Chair: Anwar al-Sadat

The 1957 African Asian Peoples' Solidarity Conference, also known as the "Cairo Conference", was held from December 26, 1957 to January 1, 1958 in Cairo, Egypt. Participants discussed international cooperation and geopolitics. This conference reaffirmed the ten principles from the Bandung Conference and added four more exclusive principles, mostly about nuclear affairs.

The conference created the Afro-Asian People's Solidarity Organization, which represents itself, as described in its later Constitution from the 1988 Delhi Conference, as a "mass solidarity movement of the peoples of Africa and Asia in the common struggle for the elimination of injustices to the people". This objective helps satisfy the "consolidation of genuine independence and the defense of sovereignty against racist policies to ensure economic security for the right to choose their way of socio-economic development, for the promotion of national culture, for a non-violent world and general disarmament, international security, and lasting peace". The Cairo Conference also established the Afro-Asian Writers' Bureau.

== Background ==
The Cairo Conference took place two years after the Bandung Conference which was held to promote Afro-Asian economic and cultural cooperation and to oppose colonialism or neocolonialism committed by any nation. It took place at the beginning of the Cold War era. The 1957 Cairo Conference hosted many representatives of Soviet-allied states.

The conference was organized by an Egyptian Committee under Anwar Sadat's leadership (later a President of Egypt) with most preparations overseen by the Conference Secretary, Egyptian writer Yusuf al-Sibai. The Committee chose the themes to be discussed in the conference and was in charge of soliciting relevant participants.

== Participants ==
The Afro-Asian Peoples' Solidarity Conference in Cairo hosted 607 participants from the following countries:

- African Delegation: 127 delegates from 19 countries.
  - Algeria: 12 delegates.
  - Cameroon: 6 delegates.
  - Ethiopia: 6 delegates.
  - Egypt: 84 delegates.
  - French Somaliland: 5 delegates.
  - French West Africa: 5 delegates.
  - Ghana: 5 delegates.
  - Italian Somaliland: 11 delegates.
  - Togoland: 2 delegates.
  - Tunisia: 6 delegates.
  - Uganda: 5 delegates.
  - Zanzibar: 10 delegates.
- Communist delegation: 70 delegates from 5 countries.
  - Soviet Union: 28 delegates.
  - People's Republic of China. The PRC delegation was led by Guo Moruo, Liu Ningyi, Liu Liangmo, and Ji Chaoding.
  - North Korea
  - Mongolia
  - North Vietnam
- Others:
  - Cyprus
  - Sudan

== Proceedings ==
The Conference was planned in three sections:

1. Plenary sessions made by leaders from the delegations.
2. The organisation of commissions in order to deal with the main themes of the Conference.
3. Final plenary sessions to draft the final resolutions.

The commissions were divided into two groups: the Political Commission and the Economic Commission.

=== The Political Commission ===
The Political Commission was divided into five subcommittees:

1. The Palestinian Subcommittee
2. The Algerian Subcommittee
3. The Subcommittee on Imperialism
4. The Racial Discrimination Subcommittee
5. The Nuclear Warfare Subcommittee

=== The Economic Commission ===
The Economic Commission was divided into three sub-commissions:

1. Economic Struggle Against Colonialism
2. The Question of Colonial Territories
3. The Final Resolutions

There was another small commission about culture.

== Outcomes of the Conference ==
The first outcome of the Conference was the creation of the Solidarity Council of the Afro-Asian Countries. The Council's name was changed to Afro-Asian People's Solidarity Organization (AAPSO) at a subsequent conference in Conakry, Guinea in April 1960. This council is permanently based in Cairo, Egypt.

The AAPSO accepted three main tasks:

- Implement the resolutions and recommendations from the Conference.
- Promote Afro-Asian solidarity movements in all countries across the two continents.
- Act as a permanent liaison office between the solidarity movements across participating countries.

Resolutions and recommendations from the Conference in 1957 were used to establish the Constitution of the Afro-Asian People's Solidarity Organization in 1988. The objectives of the organization include:

- To unite, consolidate and accelerate actions of solidarity with the struggle against all forms of aggression, racism, and to provide all-out moral, political and material support to the protection of freedom, and national independence.
- To act in an interdependent world, in support of the principles of the United Nations Charter and Non-Aligned Movement. Leading to the cooperation between AAPSO with the UN and Non-Aligned Movement with the other governmental and non-governmental organizations that act for the same objectives.
- To mobilize the peoples of Africa, Asia, and other developing countries, progressive and democratic forces all over the world, against the policy of destabilization, against military pacts, blocs, bases, and facilities.
- To rally against exploitation, to overcome backwardness, for economic security, for the sovereign right of peoples over their national resources, and to bring about socio-economic transformations.
- To strengthen the struggle for just and lasting peace and security, stopping the arms' race, for nuclear and complete disarmament, and for development.
- To safeguard, respect and uphold human rights, equal rights for women, and special protection of the child, to support the struggle for democracy and for the promotion of the democratic solution to the conflicts of nationalities and minorities.
  - To propagate the Charter of Universal Declaration of Human Rights including implementation of all the statutes, conventions, treaties and covenants passed and accepted by the United Nations Organization over the years.
- To resolve international, regional, and national conflicts by peaceful dialogue, based on the principles of the UN Charter in the spirit of solidarity based on national reconciliation.
- To support achievement and consolidation of the national unity within the Afro-Asian countries.
- Deepen cooperation between socio-economic and cultural development for the New International Information and Communication Order. Leading to mutual assistance among nations and among democratic organizations for the realization of these goals.
- To support the independent policy of the Afro-Asian States, organizations and forces which seek to extricate from political, economic, social, and cultural infiltration.
- To work, while retaining its own identity, for the activation of the movement, focusing on the masses and mass organizations, and for establishing and consolidating the alliance of the progressive, national unity among Afro-Asians and other people of the world.
- To work for the protection of the environment and for the safeguarding of the ecological resources of our planet.
