= Football at the Afro-Asian Games =

- Organiser(s): ANOCA; OCA
- Founded: 2001
- Region: Africa / Asia
- Current champions: Uzbekistan (2003)
- Most championships: Uzbekistan (1 title)

Association football, more commonly known as football or soccer, has been included Afro-Asian Games in since the first edition in 2003 as a men's competition sport.

== Tournaments ==
Year	Host	Final			Third Place Match		
Year	Host	Champions	Score	Runners-Up	Third Place	Score	Fourth Place
2003; Details	(India) Hyderabad	Uzbekistan	1 - 0	India	Zimbabwe	2 - 2 pen. 5 - 3	Rwanda
2007	(Algeria) Algiers	cancelled			cancelled		
