= Afro-Asian People's Solidarity Organisation =

Political organization

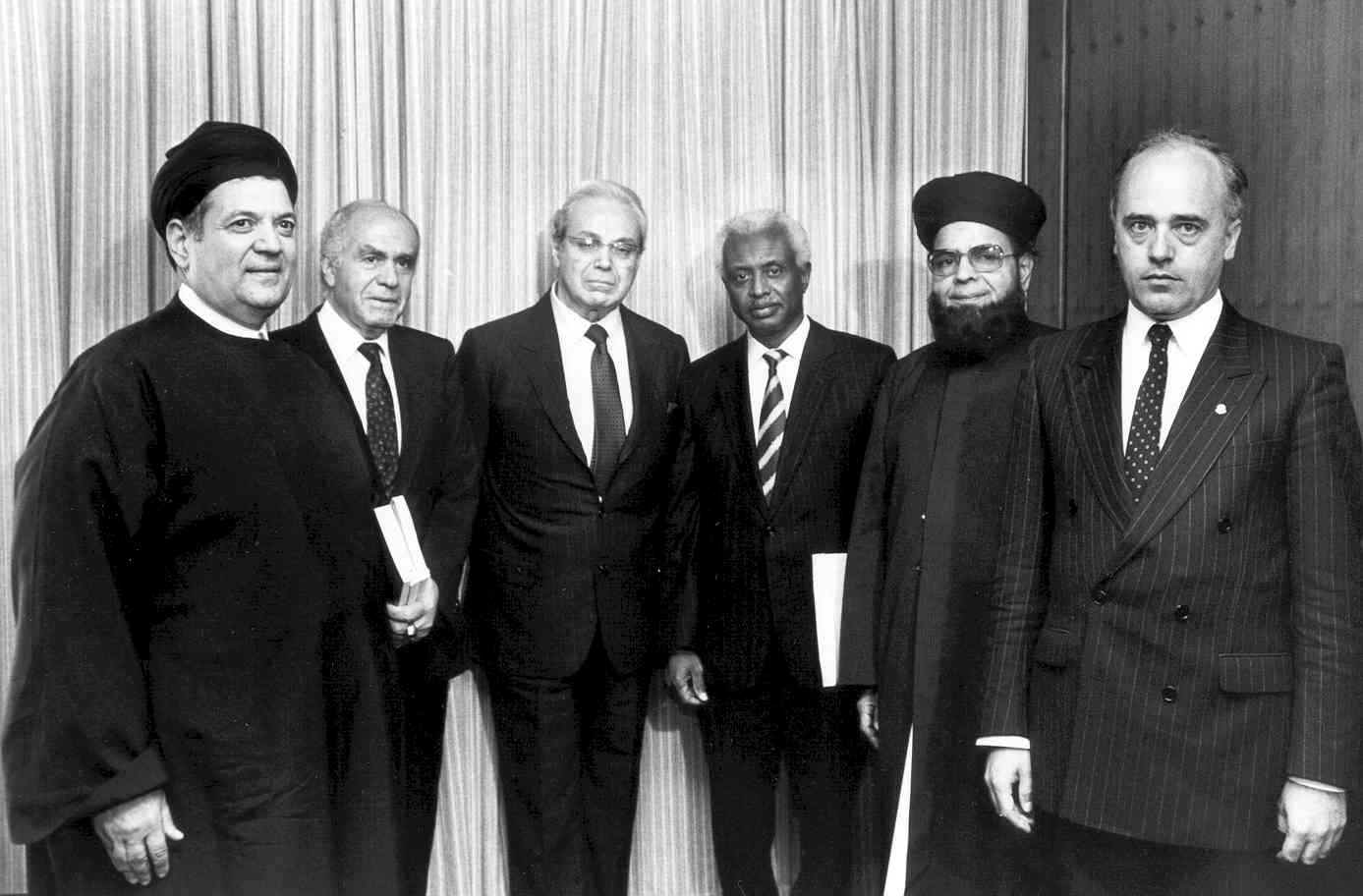
Dr. Murad Ghaleb, then Secretary-General of the Afro-Asian People's Solidarity Organisation (second from left) at the Headquarters of the United Nations (New York, 16 June 1988)

The Afro-Asian People's Solidarity Organisation (AAPSO) is an international non-governmental organization dedicated to the ideals of national liberation, anti-colonialism, and Third World solidarity. The organization is based in Egypt and has around 26–50 staff.

The AAPSO was founded as the Solidarity Council of the Afro-Asian Countries at a conference held in Cairo December 1957 to January 1958. The name was changed to its present form at the second conference held in Conakry, Guinea, in April 1960. The AAPSO has 90 national committees. The Soviet Afro-Asian Solidarity Committee was a charter member. Observer status was held by the World Federation of Trade Unions, World Federation of Democratic Youth, Women's International Democratic Federation and the World Peace Council.

== National committees ==
Country	Member	Ref
Bahrain	Bahrain AAPSO Group	
Bangladesh	Bangladesh AAPSO	
Benin	Section Beninoise de l'AAPS	
France	AFASPA	
Germany	Solidarity Committee of the German Democratic Republic	
India	The All India Committee of AIPSO	
Japan	Japan Asia Africa Latin America Solidarity Committee	
Lebanon	Comité Libanais	
Madagascar	Fifanampiana Malagasy	
Malta	Malta Labour Party	
Nepal	AAPSO Nepal	
North Korea	Korean Committee for Afro-Asian Solidarity	
Philippines	Philippine Peace and Solidarity Council	
Russia	National Committee	
Sri Lanka	National Committee	
Tanzania	National Committee	
Vietnam	National Committee	

== See also ==
- Organization of Solidarity with the People of Asia, Africa and Latin America
