= Divinity of winds (Shang dynasty) =

Wind deities worshipped by the Shang dynasty

Winds (Old Chinese: *prəm, modern Chinese: fēng) were deified and widely worshipped by the Chinese Shang dynasty (c. 1600 – 1046 BC). The Shang identified various types of winds, each associated with a wind deity, as well as the phoenix. The winds, organized into four directions, were perceived as representatives of the Shang high god Di, carrying his cosmic will. In the Shang dynasty's perception, the winds possessed divine authority and were able to affect various royal affairs. Examples yielded from Shang oracle bone script reveal a large number of texts concerning rituals dedicated to the winds, especially to appease the wind gods to avoid calamities.

The Shang differentiated winds as natural phenomena from deities perceived as able to control them. Studying linguistic elements of Shang characters referring to those notions, scholars have discovered the separation of wind and their deities in different contexts. Oracle bone inscriptions already illustrate that the supreme deity Di possessed the utmost authority over nature, having the power to send winds along with rain and clouds. The phoenix, identified as a controller of winds, was called "Messenger of Di" (帝史風) and received its own sacrifices. The deities received animal offerings, of which the majority were canine species, indicated in the oracle bones.

== Presence of wind deities ==
=== Distinguishing wind deities from natural winds ===
Some scholars have pointed out that the Shang word for "wind" (風) could also denote a kind of deity responsible for controlling them. In two particular contexts, the same character was written on two oracle bones with similar yet distinguished meanings:

- HJ 14225: [...]于帝史風(鳳)二犬 ([Missing verb] to the messenger of Dì, the wind, two dogs.)
- HJ 34137: 甲戌貞: 其寧風三羊三犬三豕 (Divined on jiǎxū day: (We) will be going to conduct the appeasing-the-wind ritual with three sheep, three dogs, and three pigs.)

In the first sentence, the "wind" appeared as "Messenger of Di", a deity. However, the "wind" in the other example was interpreted as different, probably referring to winds as natural occurrences, and the "appeasing-the-wind" did not carry meanings related directly to a god. Takashima Ken-ichi and Li Fa further illustrated it through two sentences in which a single ritualized process was used to appease both "winds" and locusts. The context places the "winds" as natural phenomena that was unexpected and sought to control, not supernatural deities.

=== Multiplicity of wind-controlling gods ===
Many argued that winds was assigned with more than one deity, using examples from Shang oracle bones. Shangdi was perceived as the most powerful being that could manipulate climatic phenomena, and he also received sacrifices in exchange of weather controls. Aside from Di, some other gods also featured powers over winds, such as Shè (Spirit of the Land), Fāng (Spirit of the Four Quarters), Wū (Shaman), and Yī Shì (Yi Yin's spouse). In her 2010 work, Chang Yuzhi also mentioned the multiplicity of the wind deities. The Shang were aware that there were various types of winds as well as spirits by which they were controlled.

== "Fèng" as a wind deity ==
Reconstructions of Old Chinese indicate that two pronunciations of the Shang oracle character "風" were *prəm (corresponding to modern "fēng") and *prəms (corresponding to modern "fèng"). It is known that the final "s" sound acted to differentiate the two written words. According to Schuessler and Xing, the pronunciation "*prəm" would give the meaning "wind" while adding the "s" sound modifies it to the verb "to be windy". Specifically, the "*prəm" was used in collocation with modifiers such as "great" or "undesired", pointing at its role as a noun; Meanwhile, the other pronunciation was preceded by the stative, negative notion "not" which indicates an adjective.

However, it is indicated that addition of "s" actually transforms the word to carry a more religious meaning: the *prəms actually refers to the phoenix, which has an identical oracle bone graph compared to *prəm "wind". In fact, the graphic representation resembles a bird-shape with tassel wings and a Heavenly Stem included. The belief that the phoenix was associated with winds is reflected in later Chinese beliefs, in which "the phoenix controlled the winds". The mythological bird was not only Di's messenger (帝使鳳) but also a wind god by its own right, being addressed in numerous different inscriptions. Both Di and the "feng" phoenix had the authority to manipulate winds, while only the latter received direct offerings.

== Sources ==
- Takashima, Ken-ichi; Li, Fa (2022). "Sacrifice to the wind gods in late Shang China–religious, paleographic, linguistic and philological analyses: An integrated approach". Journal of Chinese Writing Systems.
- Eno, Robert (2010a). "History G380: Shang Religion" (PDF). Indiana University.
- Baxter, William H.; Sagart, Laurent (2014). Baxter-Sagart Old Chinese reconstruction, v.1.1 (PDF). p. 35.
