= Oracle bone script =

Ancient form of written Chinese

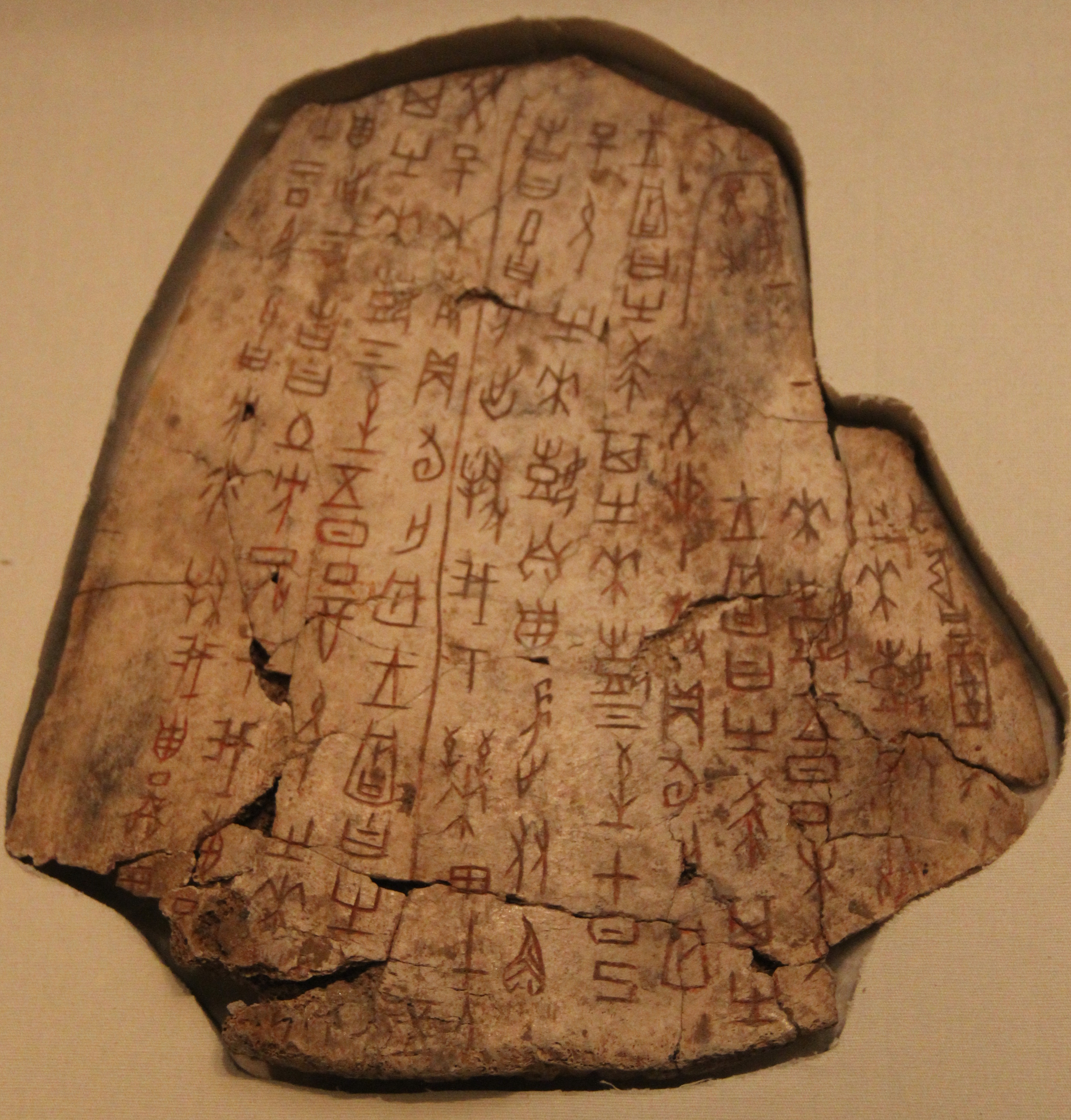
- Script type: Logographic
- Period: c. 1250 – c. 1050 BC
- Direction: Top-to-bottom vertically
- Languages: Old Chinese

Related scripts
- Child systems: Seal script

Oracle bone script

Chinese name
- Chinese: 甲骨文
- Literal meaning: shell and bone script
Transcriptions
Standard Mandarin
- Hanyu Pinyin: jiǎgǔ wén
- Bopomofo: ㄐㄧㄚˇ ㄍㄨˇ ㄨㄣˊ
- Gwoyeu Romatzyh: jeaguu wen
- Wade–Giles: Chia^{3}-ku^{3} wen^{2}
- Tongyong Pinyin: jiǎ-gǔ wún
- IPA: [tɕjà.kù wə̌n]
Wu
- Romanization: chiaʔ-kueʔ ven
Hakka
- Romanization: Gap^{5}-gut^{5} vun^{2}
Yue: Cantonese
- Yale Romanization: gaapgwāt màhn
- Jyutping: gaap3 gwat1 man4
- IPA: [kap̚˧ kʷɐt̚˥ mɐn˩]
Southern Min
- Hokkien POJ: kah-kut bûn

Vietnamese name
- Vietnamese: Giáp cốt văn chữ giáp cốt
- Hán-Nôm: 甲骨文 𡨸甲骨?

The oracle bone script is the oldest attested form of written Chinese, dating to the late 2nd millennium BC. Inscriptions were made by carving characters into oracle bones, usually either the shoulder bones of oxen or the plastrons of turtles. The writings themselves mainly record the results of official divinations carried out on behalf of the Late Shang royal family. These divinations took the form of scapulimancy where the oracle bones were exposed to flames, creating patterns of cracks that were then subjected to interpretation. Both the prompt and interpretation were inscribed on the same piece of bone that had been used for the divination itself.

Out of an estimated 150,000 inscriptions that have been uncovered, the vast majority were unearthed at Yinxu, the site of the final Shang capital (modern-day Anyang, Henan). The most recent major discovery was the Huayuanzhuang cache found near the site in 1993. Of the 1,608 Huayuanzhang pieces, 579 bear inscriptions. Each of the last nine Shang kings are named in the inscriptions (Note: A few such shells and bones do not record divinations, but bear other records such as those of hunting trips, records of sacrifices, wars or other events, calendars, or practice inscriptions;Xu 2002, pp. 31, 34 these are termed shell and bone inscriptions, rather than oracle bones, because no oracle (divination) was involved. However, they are still written in oracle bone script.) beginning with Wu Ding, whose accession is variously dated between 1250 and 1200 BC. Oracle bone inscriptions corresponding to Wu Ding's reign have been radiocarbon dated to 1254–1197 BC (±10 years). Following the overthrow of the Shang by the Zhou dynasty in c. 1046 BC, divination using milfoil became more common; far fewer oracle bone inscriptions are dated to the Western Zhou. No Zhou-era sites with a comparable cache of inscriptions to Yinxu have been found; however, examples from this period appear to be more widespread, having been found near most major population centers. New sites have continued to be discovered since 2000.

The oracle bone inscriptions—along with several roughly contemporaneous bronzeware inscriptions using a different style—constitute the earliest corpus of Chinese writing, and are the direct ancestor of the Chinese family of scripts developed over the next three millennia. Their study is essential for the research of Chinese etymologies. It is also the direct ancestor of over a dozen East Asian writing systems. The length of inscriptions ranges from 10 to over 100 characters, but a few dozen is typical. The subjects of concern in inscriptions are broad, and include war, ritual sacrifice, and agriculture, as well as births, illnesses, and deaths in the royal family. As such, they provide invaluable insights into the character of late Shang society.

== Name ==
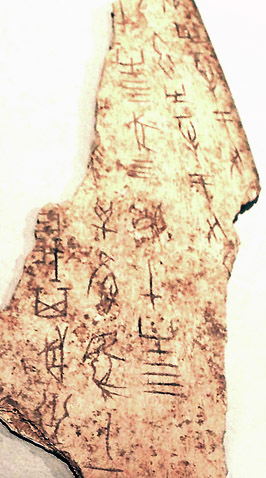
Fragments of divination on bull scapula

The common Chinese term for oracle bone script is 甲骨文 (jiǎgǔwén 'shell and bone script'), which is an abbreviation of 龜甲獸骨文字 (guījiǎ shòugǔ wénzì 'turtle-shell and animal-bone script'). This term is a translation of the English phrase "inscriptions upon bone and tortoise shell", which had been coined by the American missionary Frank H. Chalfant (1862–1914) in his 1906 book Early Chinese Writing, which first appeared in Chinese books during the 1930s. In earlier decades, Chinese authors used a variety of names for the inscriptions based on the name of Yinxu, their purpose (卜 bǔ 'to divine'), or the method of inscription (契 qì 'to engrave'). A previously common term was 殷墟卜辭 (Yīnxū bǔcí 'Yinxu divinatory texts').

=== Oraculology ===
Oraculology (甲骨学; 甲骨學; jiǎgǔxué) is the study of oracle bones and oracle bone script. It is a humanities discipline that focuses on the Chinese Upper Antiquity oracle characters. Oracle bone science is the study of oracle bone script itself; it is a discipline of paleography. This includes the integration of theories, research methods and materials from various disciplines, such as history, archaeology, historical culture, historical literature, and cultural anthropology, to thoroughly study the historical and cultural background of the oracle bones and some of the patterns of the oracle bone divination. It is a diversified and specialized discipline. In the early days of oracle bone discovery, oracle bones were called qiwen, and the study of oracle bones was called qiology. In 1931, Zhou Yitong proposed for the first time that "oracle bone science" was an independent discipline. Wang Yuxin emphasized that oracle bones are precious cultural relics and historical materials left over from the ancient period, but their value for archaeological and historical research lies in orthography beyond script interpretation, which has become increasingly recognized by scholars as orthography develops. Oracle bone science is a systematic and scientific inquiry into the inherent laws of the oracle bone script itself and uses it as a basis for glimpsing the history, society, and customs of the ancient world. The oracle bones should not be confused with orthography.

== Origins ==
It is generally agreed that the tradition of writing represented by oracle bone script existed prior to the first known examples, due to the attested script's mature state. Many characters had already undergone extensive simplifications and linearizations, and techniques of semantic extension and phonetic loaning had also clearly been used by authors for some time, perhaps centuries. However, no clearly identifiable examples of writing dating prior to the 13th century BC have been discovered. Sets of inscribed symbols on pottery, jade, and bone that have been discovered at a variety of Neolithic archeological sites across China have not been demonstrated to have any direct or indirect ancestry to the Shang oracle bone script at Anyang.

== Style ==
Oracle bone form of 虎 'tiger'

Oracle bone form of 目 'eye'

Along with the contemporary bronzeware script, the oracle bone script of the Late Shang period appears pictographic. The earliest oracle bone script appears even more so than examples from late in the period (thus some evolution did occur over the roughly 200-year period). Comparing the oracle bone script to both Shang and early Western Zhou period writing on bronzes, the oracle bone script is clearly greatly simplified, and rounded forms are often converted to rectilinear ones; this is thought to be due to the difficulty of engraving the bone's hard surface, compared with the ease of writing them in the wet clay of the molds the bronzes were cast from. The more detailed and more pictorial style of the bronze graphs is thought to be more representative of typical Shang writing using bamboo books than the oracle bone forms; this typical style continued to evolve into writing styles of the Western Zhou period, and then into the seal script within the state of Qin.

Comparison of characters in the Shang bronzeware script (first and fourth rows), oracle bone script (second and fifth rows), and regular script (third and sixth rows)

It is known that the Shang people also wrote with brush and ink, as brush-written graphs have been found on a small number of pottery, shell and bone, and jade and other stone items, and there is evidence that they also wrote on bamboo (or wooden) books (Note: There are no such bamboo books extant before the late Zhou, however, as the materials were not permanent enough to survive.) just like those found from the late Zhou to Han periods, because the graphs for a writing brush (聿 yù, depicting a hand holding a writing brush (Note: The modern word 筆 bĭ is derived from a Qin dialectal variant of this word Baxter & Sagart 2014, pp. 42–43.)) and bamboo book (冊 cè, a book of thin bamboo and wooden slips bound with horizontal strings, like a Venetian blind turned 90 degrees), are present in oracle bone inscriptions. (Note: As Qiu 2000, pp. 62–63 notes, the Shangshu's "Duoshi" chapter also refers to use of such books by the Shang.)

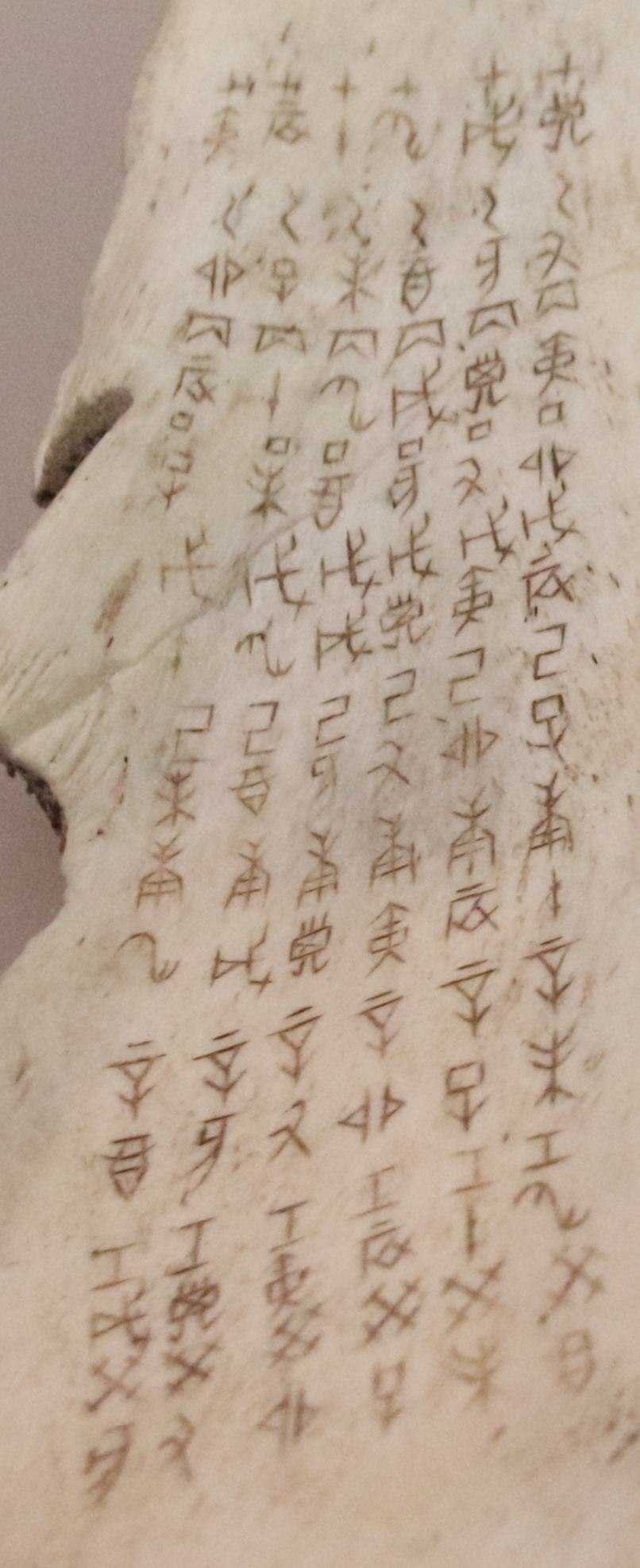
Table of the Chinese sexagenary cycle inscribed on an ox scapula, dating to the reigns of the last two kings of the Shang dynasty during the first half of the 11th century BC

Since the ease of writing with a brush is even greater than that of writing with a stylus in wet clay, it is assumed that the style and structure of Shang graphs on bamboo were similar to those on bronzes, and also that the majority of writing occurred with a brush on such books. Additional support for this notion includes the reorientation of some graphs, (Note: Identification of these graphs is based on consultation of Zhao 1988, Liu 1997, Wu 1990, Keightley 1978, and Qiu 2000) by rotating them 90 degrees, as if to better fit on tall, narrow slats. The style must have developed on books of bamboo or wood slats, and then carried over to the oracle bone script. Additionally, the layout of characters in columns from top to bottom is mostly carried over from bamboo books. In some instances, characters are instead written in rows in order to match the text with divinatory cracks; in others, columns of text rotate 90 degrees mid-phrase. These are exceptions to the normal pattern of writing, and inscriptions were never read bottom to top. Columns of text in Chinese writing are traditionally laid out from right to left; this pattern is first found with the Shang-era bronze inscriptions. However, oracle bone inscriptions are often arranged with columns beginning near the center of the shell or bone, then moving toward the edge such that the two sides mirror one another.

== Structure and function ==
豕 'swine'

犬 'dog'

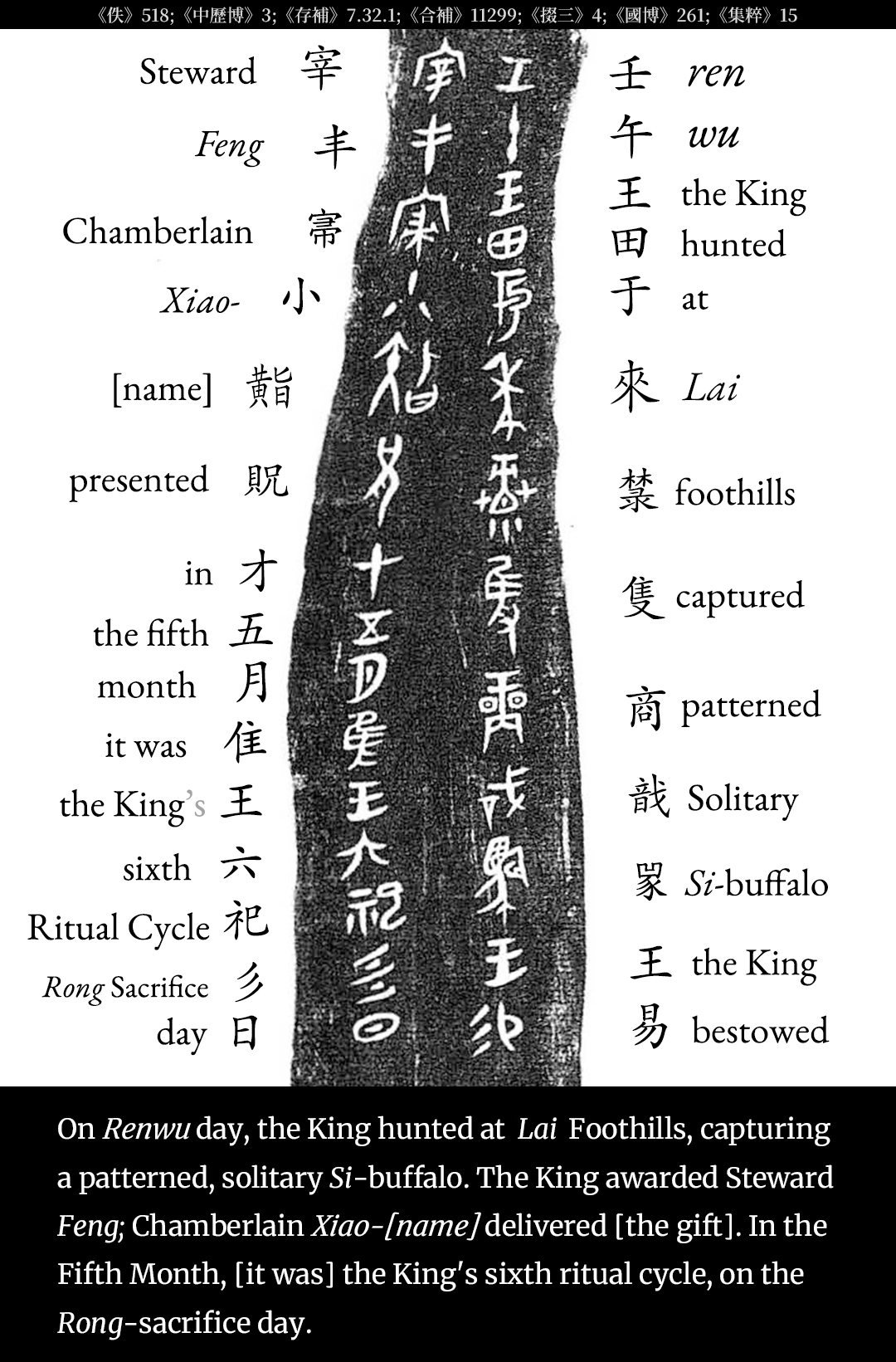
Annotated word-for-word grammatical analysis of the "Zaifeng" bone inscription (宰丰骨). It records the King's hunt, the capture of a prize Si-buffalo, and the subsequent reward.

Despite the pictorial nature of the oracle bone script, it was a fully functional and mature writing system by the time of the Shang dynasty, meaning it was able to record the Old Chinese language, and not merely fragments of ideas or words. This level of maturity clearly implies an earlier period of development of at least several hundred years. (Note: Boltz surmises that the Chinese script was invented around the middle of the 2nd millennium BC during the early Shang, and based on the currently available evidence declares attempts to push this date earlier "unsubstantiated speculation and wishful thinking". Boltz 1994, p. 39) From their presumed origins as pictographs and signs, by the Shang dynasty, most graphs were already conventionalized in such a simplified fashion that the meanings of many of the pictographs are not immediately apparent. Without careful research to compare these to later forms, one would probably not know that these represented 豕 'swine' and 犬 'dog' respectively. As William G. Boltz notes, most of the oracle bone graphs are not depicted realistically enough for those who do not already know the script to recognize what they stand for; although pictographic in origin, they are no longer pictographs in function. Boltz instead calls them zodiographs, emphasizing their function as representing concepts exclusively through words. Similarly, Qiu labels them semantographs.

By the late Shang, oracle bone graphs had already evolved into mostly non-pictographic forms, including all the major types of Chinese characters now in use. Loangraphs, phono-semantic compounds, and associative compounds were already common. One structural and functional analysis of the oracle bone characters found that they were 23% pictographs, 2% simple indicatives, 32% associative compounds, 11% phonetic loans, 27% phono-semantic compounds, and 6% undetermined. (Note: Li 1968, p. 95, cited in Woon 1987; the percentages do not add up to 100% due to rounding; see Chinese character classification for explanations of the various types listed here.)

Comparison of oracle bone script, large and small seal scripts, and regular script characters for 秋 'autumn'

Although it was a fully functional writing system, the oracle bone script was not fully standardized. By the early Western Zhou period, these traits had vanished, but in both periods, the script was not highly regular or standardized; variant forms of graphs abound, and the size and orientation of graphs is also irregular. A graph when inverted horizontally generally refers to the same word, and additional components are sometimes present without changing the meaning. These irregularities persisted until the standardization of the seal script during the Qin dynasty.

There are over 30,000 distinct characters found from all the bone fragments so far, which may represent around 4,000 individual characters in their various forms. The majority of these still remain undeciphered, although scholars believe they can decipher between 1,500 and 2,000 of these characters. One reason for the difficulty in decipherment is that components of certain oracle bone script characters may differ in later script forms. Such differences may be accounted for by character simplification and/or by later generations misunderstanding the original graph, which had evolved beyond recognition. For instance, the standard character 秋 'autumn' now appears with the components 禾 'plant stalk' and 火 'fire', whereas the oracle bone form depicts an insect-like figure with antennae – either a cricket or a locust – with a variant depicting fire below said figure. In this case, the modern character is a simplification of an archaic variant 𪛁 (or 𥤚) which is closer to the oracle bone script form – albeit with the insect figure being confused with the similar-looking character for 龜 'turtle' and the addition of the 禾 component.

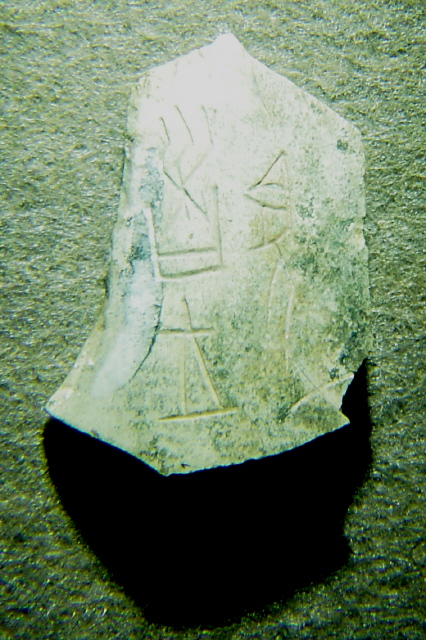
Oracle bone script fragment featuring a character for 'spring' in the top-left, which has no known modern descendant

Some characters are only attested in the oracle bone script, dropping out of later usage and usually being replaced by newer characters. An example is a fragment bearing character for 'spring' that has no known modern counterpart. In such cases, available context may be used to determine the possible meaning of the character. In other cases, the character may be assumed to be a phono-semantic compound, and a rough meaning can be inferred based on the semantic component. For instance, an oracle bone character was recently found which consists of 礻 on the left and 升 on the right ([礻升] when converted from oracle bone forms to their modern printed equivalents). This character may reasonably be guessed to a compound with 示 'altar' as the semantic and 升 (modern reading sheng) as the phonetic. Though no modern character consists of these two components, it likely refers to a type of Shang dynasty ritual with a name similar to the pronunciation of 升 in Old Chinese. (Note: This character was found on one of nine oracle bone fragments in the Shandong Provincial Museum's collection. The full inscription reads: 丁未卜，王[礻升]叀父戊？ This was the first time that the graph ⟨礻升⟩ had been attested in oracle bone inscriptions. Wang translated the sentence as: "Prognostication on the day dingwei: if the king performs the sheng sacrifice, will it benefit Ancestor Wu?" The newly found graph was tentatively assigned the same modern reading as the phonetic component 升.) In the same collection of fragments, the character ⟨阝心⟩ was surmised to be a place name, since the semantic component 阜 means 'mound', 'hill', and the divination concerned the king traveling for a royal hunt. (Note: The full inscription: 戊寅卜，旅貞：王其于[阝心]，亡災？ Translation: Prognostication on the day wuyin by Diviner Lü: if the king travels to [placename, possibly read xin], will there be harm?)

Oracle bone script forms, from the left: 馬 'horse', 虎 'tiger', 豕 'swine', 犬 'dog', 鼠 'rat', 象 'elephant', 豸 'beasts of prey', 龜 'turtle', 爿 'low table', 為 'to lead', and 疾 'illness'

== Zhou dynasty inscriptions ==
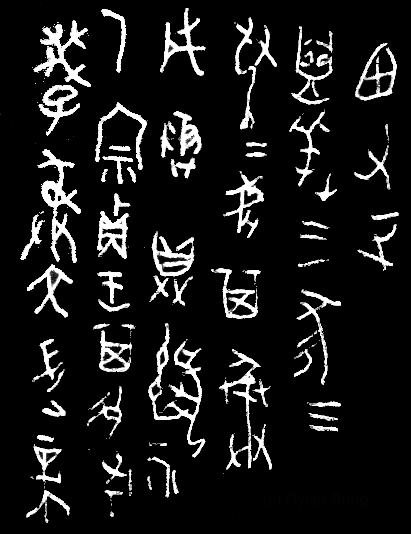
Hand copy of a Zhou inscription

There are relatively few oracle bone inscriptions dating during and after the conquest of the Shang by the Zhou dynasty (c. 1046 BC).

From their initial discovery during the 1950s, only a handful of examples from this later period had been uncovered, and those that did were fragments consisting of only one or two characters. In August 1977, a cache containing thousands of Zhou-era oracle bones was discovered at a site closely linked to the ancient Zhou heartland. Among thousands of pieces, 200–300 bore inscriptions. One such inscription appears to describe Wu Geng being called to the court of King Wu of Zhou, possibly around the time of the Battle of Muye.

In 2004, an ancestral temple for Duke Dan of Zhou was uncovered, dating to the Western Zhou period and containing over 2,000 inscriptions.

== Scholarship ==
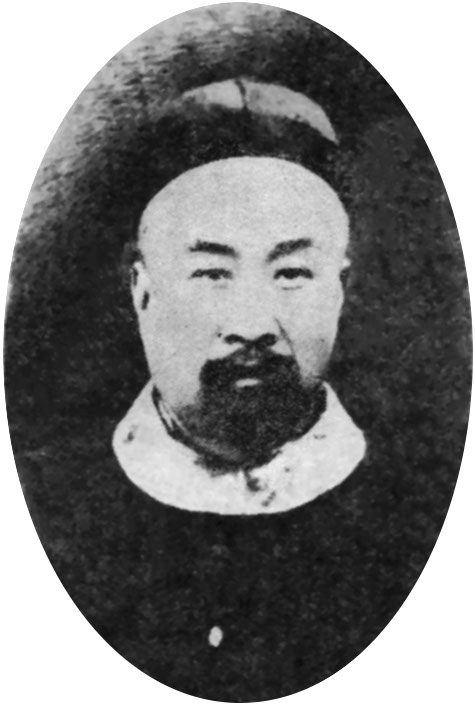
Wang Yirong, Chinese politician and scholar, was the first to recognize the oracle bone inscriptions as ancient writing.

Among the major scholars making significant contributions to the study of the oracle bone writings, especially early on, were:

- Wang Yirong recognized the characters as being ancient Chinese writing in 1899.
- Liu E collected five thousand oracle bone fragments, published the first collection of 1,058 rubbings entitled Tieyun Canggui (鐵雲藏龜, Tie Yun's [i.e., Liu E] Repository of Turtles) in 1903, and correctly identified thirty-four characters.
- Sun Yirang was the first serious researcher of oracle bones.
- Luo Zhenyu collected over 30,000 oracle bones and published several volumes, identified the names of the Shang kings, and thus positively identified the oracle bones as being artifacts from the Shang reign.
- Wang Guowei demonstrated that the commemorative cycle of the Shang kings matched the list of kings in Sima Qian's Records of the Historian.
- Dong Zuobin identified the diviners and established a chronology for the oracle bones as well as numerous other dating criteria.
- Guo Moruo editor of the Jiaguwen Heji, the largest published collection of oracle bones.
- Ken-ichi Takashima, first scholar to systematically treat the language of the oracle bones from the perspective of modern linguistics.

== Computer encoding ==
A proposal to include the oracle bone script in Unicode is being prepared. However, although Unicode Plane 3 (the Tertiary Ideographic Plane) is available for early Chinese scripts, there is currently no tentative allocation for the oracle bone script.

== Samples ==
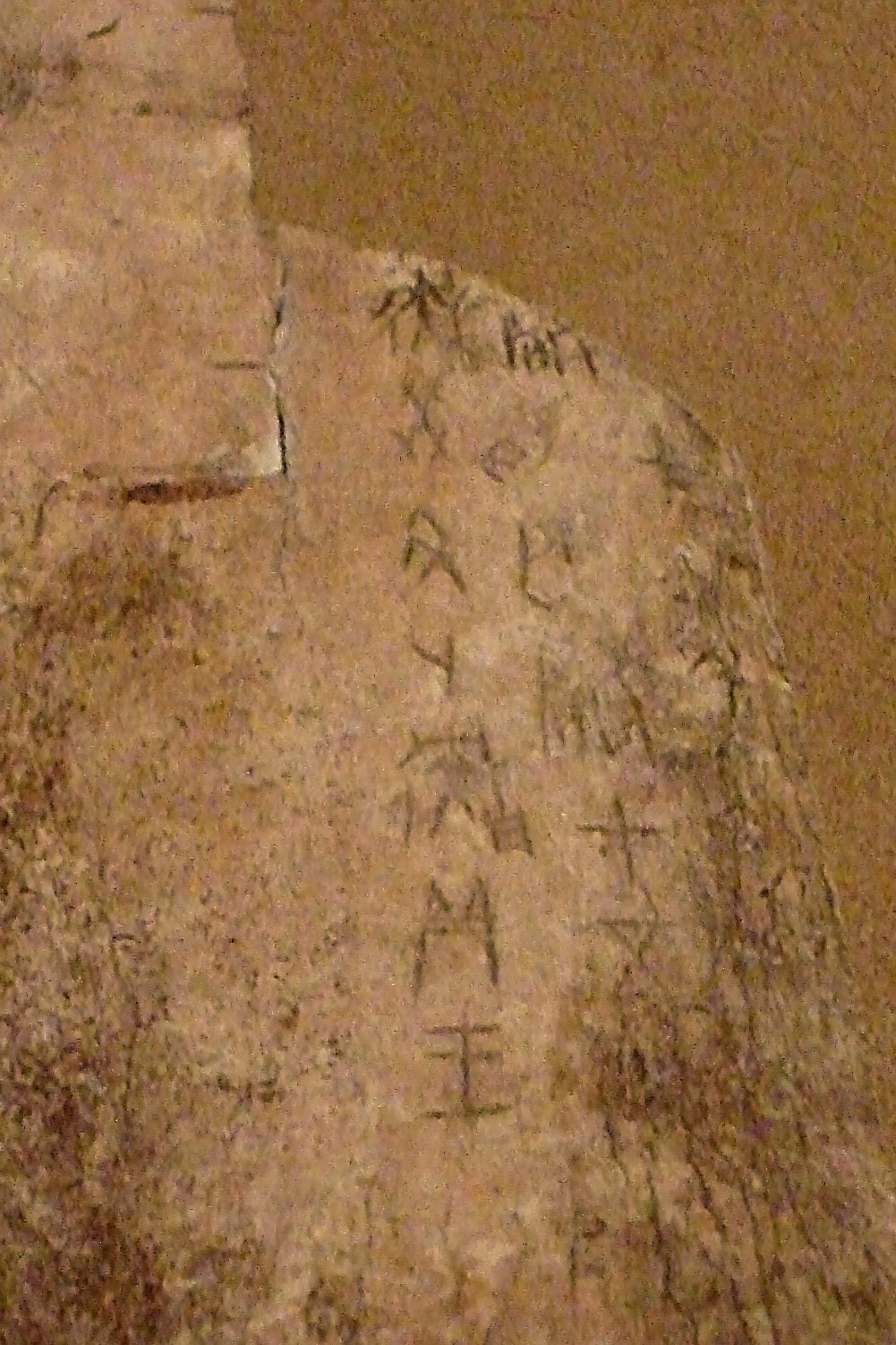
An oracle bone (incomplete) with a diviner asking the Shang king if there would be misfortune over the next ten days

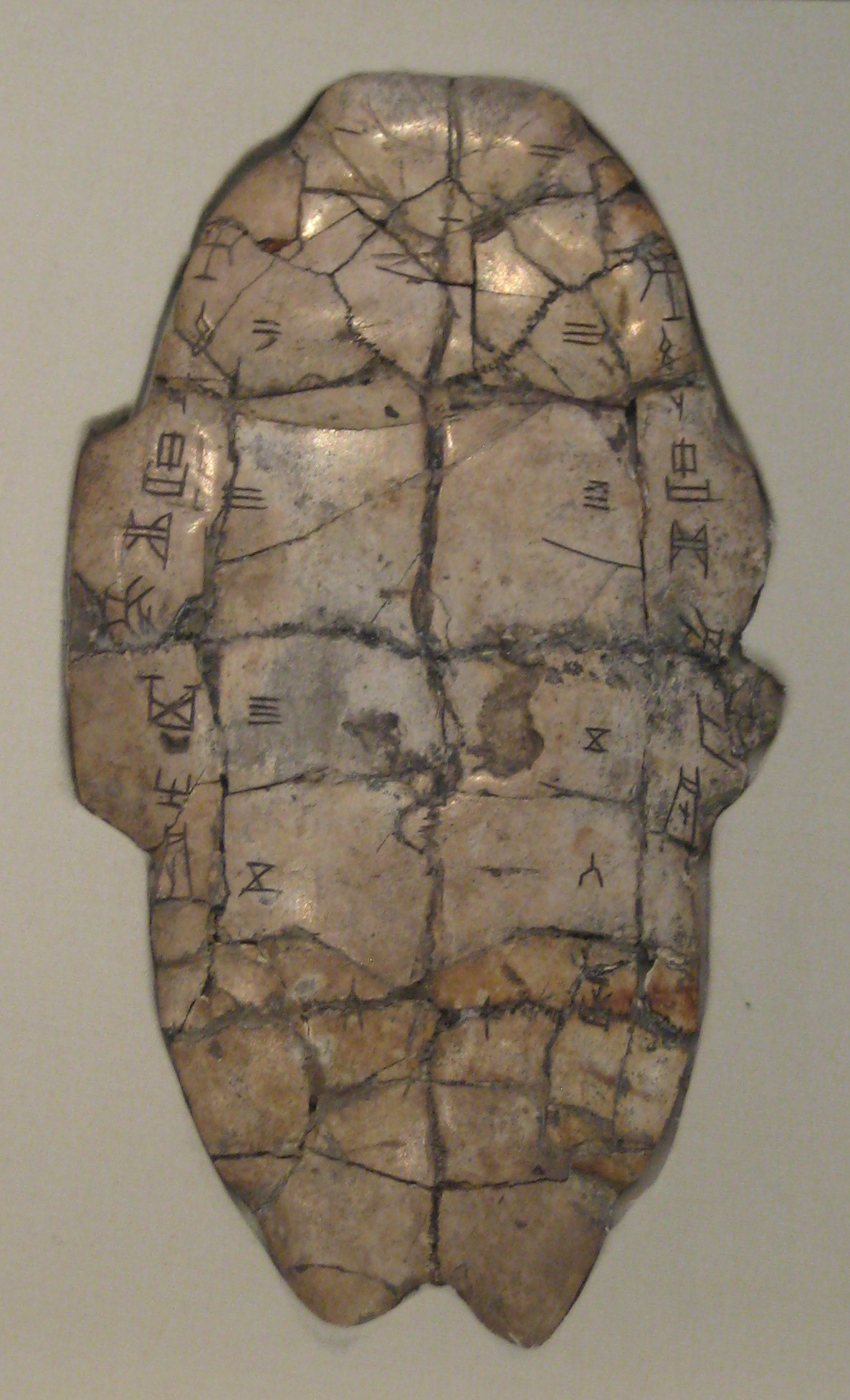
Tortoise plastron with divination inscription dating to the reign of King Wu Ding

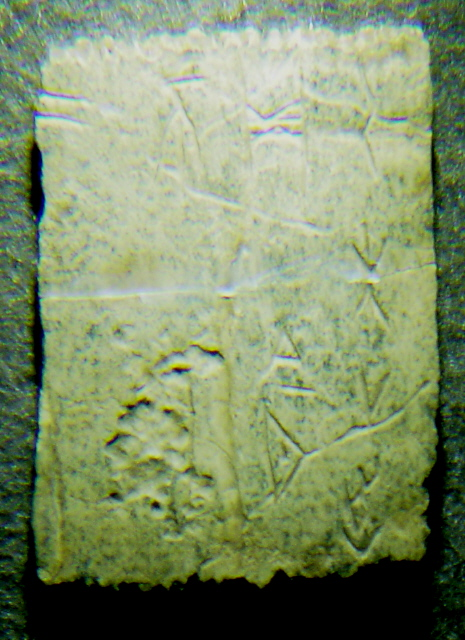
Oracle script from a divining

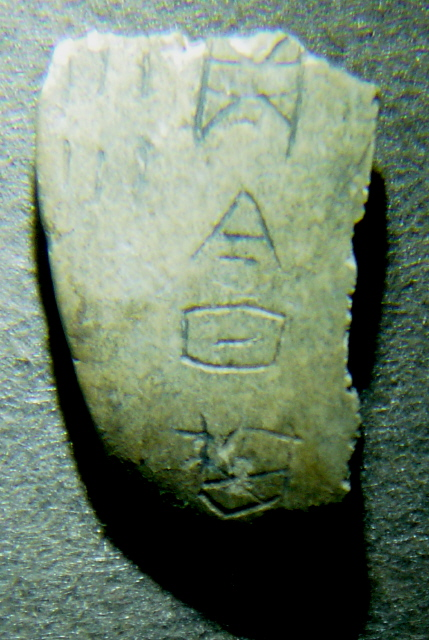
Oracle script inquiry about rain: "Today, will it rain?"

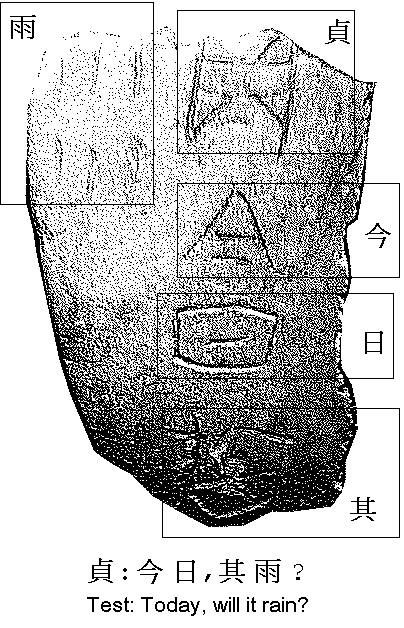
Oracle script inquiry about rain (annotated)

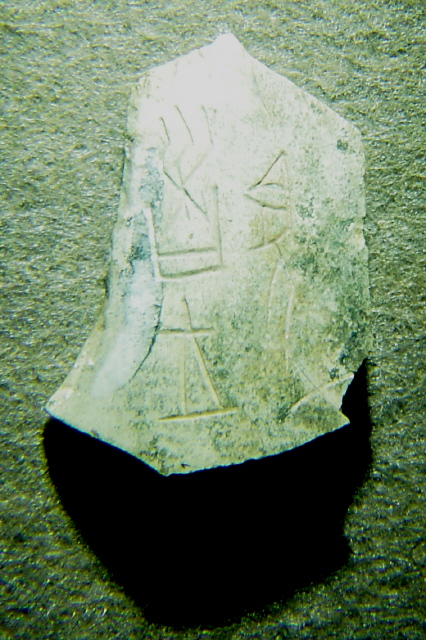
Oracle script for Spring

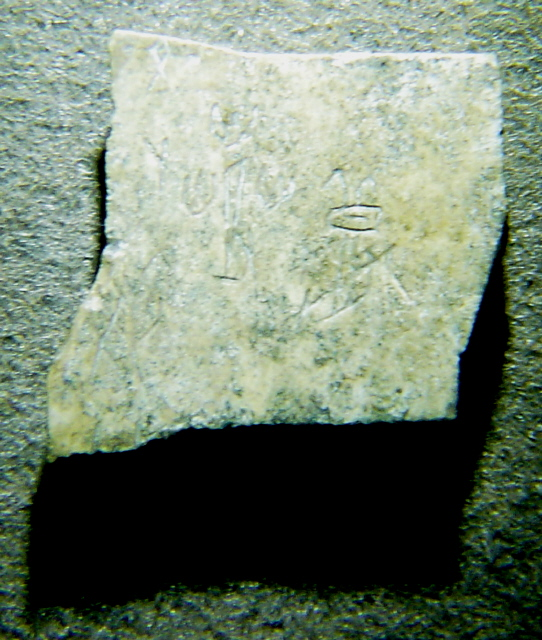
Oracle script for Autumn

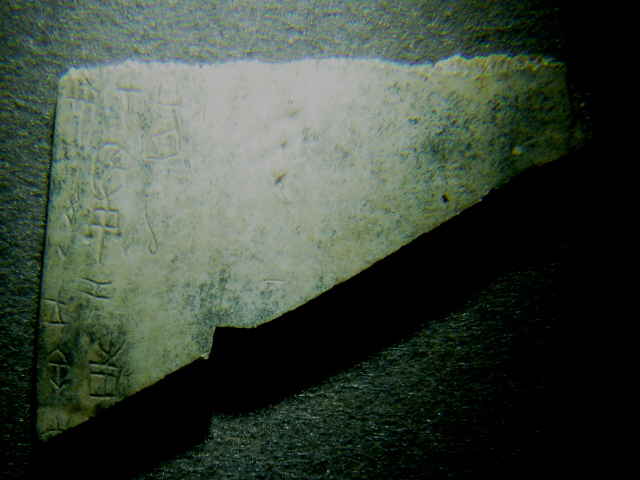
Oracle script for Winter

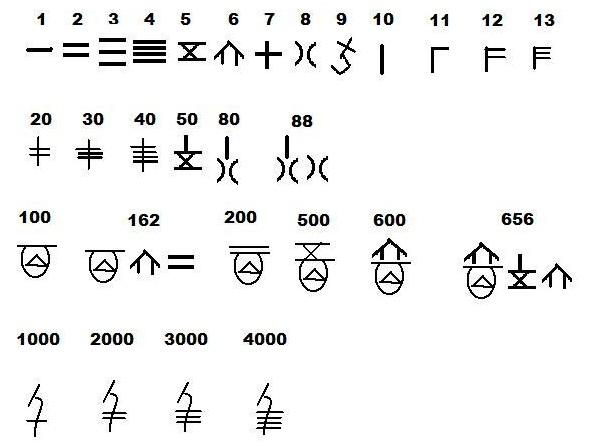
Shang oracle bone numerals
