= Hisae Sawachi =

Japanese writer and activist (born 1930)

- 澤地久枝
- Born: 3 September 1930 (age 96); Minato, Tokyo, Empire of Japan
- Education: Tokyo Metropolitan Mukaioka High School
- Alma mater: Waseda University
- Writing career
- Notable awards: Asahi Prize; Kikuchi Kan Prize; Japan Women Broadcasters Association Award
- Website: sites.google.com/site/hisaesawachi/

Hisae Sawachi (Japanese: 澤地久枝, Japanese: さわち ひさえ born 3 September 1930) is a Japanese writer, magazine editor and anti-nuclear activist. She is known for her non-fiction writing on Japan's Shōwa era and wartime experiences as well as for her autobiographical work. She is a recipient of the Asahi Prize, the Kikuchi Kan Prize and the Japan Women Broadcasters Association Award.

== Early life and education ==
Sawachi was born on 3 September 1930 in Minato, Tokyo, Empire of Japan. As a child, Hisae and her family emigrated to Jilin, Manchuria. After the Japanese defeat in World War II in 1945, she lived in a refugee camp known as "Kin-Ken" for a year, before her family returned to Japan aboard a repatriation ship bound for Hakata in August 1946. Her mother had become very unwell and her father suffered from jaundice. In 1947, she moved to Tokyo.

Sawachi studied at Tokyo Metropolitan Mukaioka High School then at Waseda University (Japanese: 早稲田大学) in Shinjuku, Tokyo. While a student at Waseda, she participated in the 1952 May Day protests, marching alongside the Publisher's Labour Union and then with fellow university students. Two demonstrators were killed by the Police during the protest which became known as Bloody May Day.

After graduating from university, Sawachi worked for Chuokoron-Shinsha publishing house. Sawachi also worked as the editor of the bi-weekly women's magazine Fujin Kōron.

In 1959, Sawachi underwent heart surgery and, after a relapse, had a second heart surgery in 1969. In 1994, she had heart surgery to replace her mitral valve with an artificial one.

== Writing ==
Sawachi is known for her non-fiction writing on Japan's Shōwa era and wartime experiences as well as for her autobiographical work. Her first book Wives of the February 26 Incident, about the wives of the young army officers who attempted a coup d'état and assassinated Prime Minister Inukai Tsuyoshi in 1936 (later known as the February 26 incident), was published in 1972.

Sawachi's book Midowei Kaisen Kiroku established the Japanese casualty figures of World War II's 1942 naval Battle of Midway in the Pacific Ocean. She tabulated the name, rank, birth province, age at time of death, and term of service from Japanese prefectural records, alongside researching the lists of people who received decorations published in newspapers, visiting archives and veterans associations in the United States and Japan and visiting the graves of fallen soldiers. Her figure of 3,057 casualties is considered "authoritative." The book was awarded the Kikuchi Kan Prize. After writing Midowei Kaisen Kiroku, Sawachi wrote a series of magazine articles detailing the lives of the casualties from the Battle of Midway and the grief experienced by their families, considered from both the Japanese and American perspectives. The articles were republished in five volumes from 1984 to 1985. A new edition was released in 2025.

In 1980, Sawachi interviewed Tomiko Satō (Japanese-Chinese wife of writer Guo Moruo) for a biography of her in Zoku Shōwashi no onna (1983).

Sawachi has appeared on NHK programmes such as Talking About the Outbreak of War Between Japan and the United States: Why Did the Navy Make a Mistake? - From 400 Hours of Testimony. In 1985, she was honoured with the Japan Women Broadcasters Association Award. She has also conducted interviews for Japanese late night television.

Sawachi's book 14 Sai: Fōteen explores the concepts of militarism and gyokusai (a term meaning "to die gallantly as a jewel shatters" used by the Japanese military) in the Shōwa era. Sawachi was awarded the Asahi Prize in 2008 for “Non-fiction Work Examining the Realities of the Showa Period Leading Up to the War."

In 2020, she wrote a tribute to Japanese physician Tetsu Nakamura, after his death in Afghanistan.

== Activism ==
In 1982, Sawachi appeared at Tokyo High Court as a defence witness, where she criticised the anti-pornography clause of the Japanese Penal Code as "anachronistic."

Sawachi campaigned against the potential repeal of Article 9 of the Japanese Constitution, a clause in the Constitution of Japan that prohibits an act of war by the state. In 2004, a group of Article 9 supporters, including Sawachi, Kenzaburō Ōe, Makoto Oda, Mutsuko Miki and Takeshi Umehara joined to establish the Article 9 Association.

After the 2011 Fukushima nuclear accident at Fukushima Daiichi Nuclear Power Plant, Sawachi attended anti-nuclear protest rallies.

As of 2023, Sawachi had participated in monthly standing anti-war demonstrations in front of the National Diet since 2015. She has attended every month, aside from a few months in 2020 while recovering from a broken lumbar vertebrae caused by a fall. She also gives talks to young people about war.
