= Guo Moruo =

Chinese politician, poet, and historian (1892–1978)

- 郭沫若
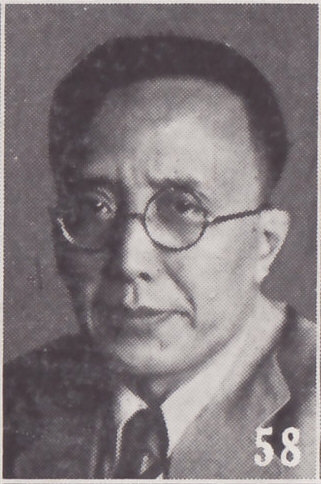

President of the University of Science and Technology of China
- In office 1958–1978
- Succeeded by: Yan Jici (1980)

Chairman of the Chinese Academy of Sciences
- In office 1949–1978
- Succeeded by: Fang Yi

Chairman of the China Federation of Literary and Art Circles
- In office 1949–1978
- Succeeded by: Zhou Yang

Personal details
- Born: 16 November 1892 Leshan, Sichuan, Qing dynasty
- Died: 12 June 1978 (aged 85) Beijing, China
- Spouses: Zhang Jinghua (1890–1980) (m. 1912) Sato Tomiko (1894–1995) (m. 1916) Yu Liqun (1916–1979) (m. 1939)
- Domestic partner(s): Yu Lizhen (1912–1937); Huang Dinghui (1907–2017)
- Children: 8 sons and 3 daughters
- Education: Kyushu University
- Awards: 1948 Research Fellow of the Academia Sinica
- Writing career
- Pen name: Dingtang (鼎堂)
- Language: Mandarin Chinese
- Years active: from 1916
- Period: Modern (20th century)
- Genres: Poetry; novella; short story; play; translation; autobiography; history; academic; oration
- Movements: New Culture Movement; proletarian literature

Chinese name
- Chinese: 郭沫若
Transcriptions
Standard Mandarin
- Hanyu Pinyin: Guō Mòruò
- Wade–Giles: Kuo^{1} Mo^{4}-jo^{4}
- IPA: [kwó mwôɻwô]
Yue: Cantonese
- Jyutping: Gwok3 Mut6-joek6
- IPA: [kʷɔk̚˧ mut̚˨ jœk̚˨]

Courtesy name
- Chinese: 鼎堂
Transcriptions
Standard Mandarin
- Hanyu Pinyin: Dǐngtáng

Birth name
- Traditional Chinese: 郭開貞
- Simplified Chinese: 郭开贞
Transcriptions
Standard Mandarin
- Hanyu Pinyin: Guō Kāizhēn

Guo Moruo (November 16, 1892 – June 12, 1978), courtesy name Dingtang, was a Chinese author, poet, historian, archaeologist, and government official. A prominent Chinese writer in the May Fourth Movement and later in the Mao era, he was persecuted during the Cultural Revolution. The persecution led him to denounce his colleagues and his past work and demand that all of it be burned, an act for which he was labeled "shameless". He regained prominence in the 1970s and is generally well-regarded in modern China.

== Biography ==
=== Family history ===
Guo Moruo, originally named Guo Kaizhen, was born on November 10 or 16, in the small town of Shawan, located on the Dadu River some 40 km (25 mi) southwest from what was then called the city of Jiading (Lu) (Chia-ting (Lu), 嘉定(路)), and now is the central urban area of the prefecture level city of Leshan in Sichuan Province.

At the time of Guo's birth, Shawan was a town of some 180 families.

Guo's father's ancestors were Hakkas from Ninghua County in Tingzhou Prefecture, near the western border of Fujian. They moved to Sichuan in the second half of the 17th century, after Sichuan had lost much of its population to the rebels/bandits of Zhang Xianzhong (c. 1605–1647). According to family legend, the only possessions that Guo's ancestors brought to Sichuan were things they could carry on their backs. Guo's great-grandfather, Guo Xianlin, was the first in the family to achieve a degree of prosperity. Guo Xianlin's sons established the Guo clan as the leaders of the local river shipping business, and thus important people in that entire region of Sichuan. It was only then that the Guo clan members became able to send their children to school.

Guo's father, one of whose names may possibly have been Guo Mingxing (1854–1939), had to drop out of school at the age of 13 and then spent six months as an apprentice at a salt well. Thereafter he entered his father's business, a shrewd and smart man who achieved some local renown as a Chinese medical doctor, traded successfully in oils, opium, liquor, and grain and operated a money changing business. His business success allowed him to increase the family's real estate and salt well holdings.

Guo's mother, in contrast, came from a scholar-official family background. She was a daughter of Du Zhouzhang, a holder of the coveted jinshi degree. Whilst serving as an acting magistrate in Huangping prefecture (黄平州), now part of Qiandongnan Miao and Dong Autonomous Prefecture, in eastern Guizhou, Du died in 1858 while fighting Miao rebels, when his daughter (the future mother of Guo Moruo) was less than a year old. She married into the Guo family in 1872, when she was fourteen.

=== Childhood ===
Guo was the eighth child of his mother. Three of his siblings had died before he was born, but more children were born later, so by the time he went to school, he had seven siblings.

Guo also had the childhood name Guo Wenbao ("Cultivated Leopard"), given due to a dream his mother had on the night he was conceived.

A few years before Guo was born, his parents retained a private tutor, Shen Huanzhang, to provide education for their children, in the hope of them later passing civil service examinations. A precocious child, Guo started studying at this "family school" in the spring of 1897, at the early age of four and a half. Initially, his studies were based on Chinese classics, but with the government education reforms of 1901, mathematics and other modern subjects started to be introduced.

When in the fall of 1903 a number of public schools were established in Sichuan's capital, Chengdu, the Guo children started going there to study. Guo's oldest brother, Guo Kaiwen (1877–1936), entered one of them, Dongwen Xuetang, a secondary school preparing students for study in Japan; the next oldest brother, Guo Kaizou, joined Wubei Xuetang, a military school. Guo Kaiwen soon became instrumental in exposing his brother and sisters still in Shawan to modern books and magazines that allowed them to learn about the wide world outside.

Guo Kaiwen continued to be a role model for his younger brothers when in February 1905 he left for Japan, to study law and administration at Tokyo Imperial University on a provincial government scholarship.

After passing competitive examinations, in early 1906 Guo Moruo started attending the new upper-level primary school (高等小學; gāoděng xiǎoxué) in Jiading. It was a boarding school located in a former Buddhist temple and the boy lived on premises. He went on to a middle school in 1907, acquiring by this time the reputation of an academically gifted student but a troublemaker. His peers respected him and often elected him a delegate to represent their interests in front of the school administration. Often spearheading student-faculty conflicts, he was expelled and reinstated a few times, and finally expelled permanently in October 1909.

Guo was glad to be expelled, as he now had a reason to go to the provincial capital Chengdu to continue his education there.

In October 1911, Guo was surprised by his mother announcing that a marriage was arranged for him. He went along with his family's wishes, marrying his appointed bride, Zhang Jinghua, sight-unseen in Shawan in March 1912. Immediately, he regretted this marriage, and five days after the marriage, he left his ancestral home and returned to Chengdu, leaving his wife behind. He never formally divorced her, but apparently never lived with her either.

=== Study abroad ===
Following his elder brothers, Guo left China in December 1913, reaching Japan in early January 1914. After a year of preparatory study in Tokyo, he entered Sixth Higher School in Okayama. When visiting a friend of his hospitalized in Saint Luke's Hospital in Tokyo, in the summer of 1916, Guo fell in love with Sato Tomiko, a Japanese woman from a Christian family, who worked at the hospital as a student nurse. Sato would become his common-law wife. They were to stay together for 20 years, until the outbreak of the war, and to have five children together.

After graduation from the Okayama school, Guo entered in 1918 the Medical School of Kyushu Imperial University in Fukuoka. He was more interested in literature than medicine, however. His studies at this time focused on foreign language and literature, namely the works of: Spinoza, Goethe, Walt Whitman, and the Nobel Laureate Rabindranath Tagore. Along with numerous translations, he published his first anthology of poems, entitled The Goddesses (女神; nǚshén) (1921). He co-founded the Creation Society (創造社) in Shanghai, which promoted modern and vernacular literature.

=== The war years ===
Guo joined the Chinese Communist Party in 1927. He was involved in the Communist Nanchang Uprising and fled to Japan after its failure. He stayed there for 10 years studying Chinese ancient history. During that time he published his work on inscriptions on oracle bones and bronze vessels, Corpus of Inscriptions on Bronzes from the Two Zhou Dynasties (两周金文辭大系考釋). During this period he published ten monographs on archeology of the Shang and Zhou periods and ancient Chinese script, thus establishing himself as a preeminent scholar in the field.

In the summer of 1937, shortly after the Marco Polo Bridge incident, Guo returned to China to join the anti-Japanese resistance. His attempt to arrange for Sato Tomiko and their children to join him in China were frustrated by the Japanese authorities, and in 1939 he remarried to Yu Liqun, a Shanghai actress. After the war, Sato went to reunite with him but was disappointed to know that he had already formed a new family.

During the Second United Front period, Guo was recruited into the Political Department of the Military Affairs Commission.

In the Nationalist Government's Political Affairs Bureau, Guo organized campaigns to present lectures, music, photography and cartoon exhibits, cinema, and public health and nutrition in the streets in order to reach new audiences.

Guo's 1942 play Qu Yuan depicted the titular poet from the Warring States period as a patriotic figure.

In 1942, Guo's essay The Answer to Nora was published in New China Daily. Guo's essay responded to Lu Xun's question "what happens after Nora"—the principal character in Henrik Ibsen's play A Doll's House -- "leaves home". Writing that Nora should emulate the revolutionary martyr Qiu Jin, Guo stated, "Where should Nora go after she leaves the doll's house? She should study and acquire the skills to live independently; fight to achieve women's emancipation in the context of national liberation; take on women's responsibilities in national salvation; and not fear sacrificing her life to accomplish these tasks -- these are the right answers."

=== As a communist leader ===
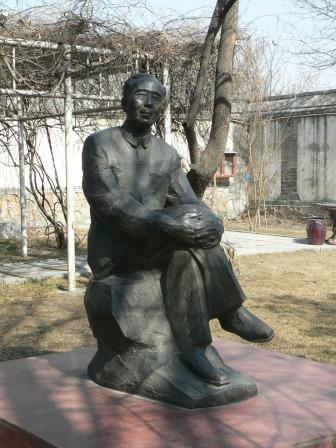
Statue of Guo in Shichahai Park, Beijing

In the 1950s, Guo held key positions in the Communist Party.

Guo viewed literature as a mechanism for social and political change. He was a prolific writer, not just of poetry but also fiction, plays, autobiographies, translations, and historical and philosophical treatises. He was the first President of the Chinese Academy of Sciences and remained so from its founding in 1949 until his death in 1978. He was also the first president of University of Science & Technology of China (USTC), a new type of university established by the Chinese Academy of Sciences (CAS) after the founding of the People's Republic of China and aimed at fostering high-level personnel in the fields of science and technology.

For the first 15 years of the PRC, Guo, with his extensive knowledge of Chinese history and culture, was the ultimate arbiter of philosophical matters relating to art, education, and literature, although all of his most vital and important work had been written before 1949.

Guo was one of the leaders of China's delegation to the December 1957 Afro-Asian Peoples' Solidarity Conference, along with Liu Liangmo, Liu Ningyi, and Ji Chaoding.

Beginning in the middle of 1958, the new folk song movement sought to compile folk songs and poetry. Among the major compendiums of these folk works was Red Flag Ballads, compiled by Guo and Zhou Yang, which presented the works of amateur poets anonymously as part of an effort to develop the figure of the mass writer in communist art and literature. The volume was one of the major artistic works of the Great Leap Forward.

In April 1958, Guo published Let a Hundred Flowers Bloom in People's Daily. This series of 101 poems, each taking the name and voice of a different flower, praised the PRC, the Communist Party, and new agricultural policy.

With the onset of the Cultural Revolution in 1966, Guo became an early target of persecution. To save face, he wrote a public self-criticism and declared that all his previous works were in error and should be burned. He then turned to writing poetry praising Mao's wife Jiang Qing and the Cultural Revolution and also denounced former friends and colleagues as counterrevolutionaries. However, this was not enough to protect his family. Two of his sons, Guo Minying and Guo Shiying, "committed suicide" in 1967 and 1968 following "criticism" or persecution by Red Guards. He copied one of their diaries by hand in a form of penance.

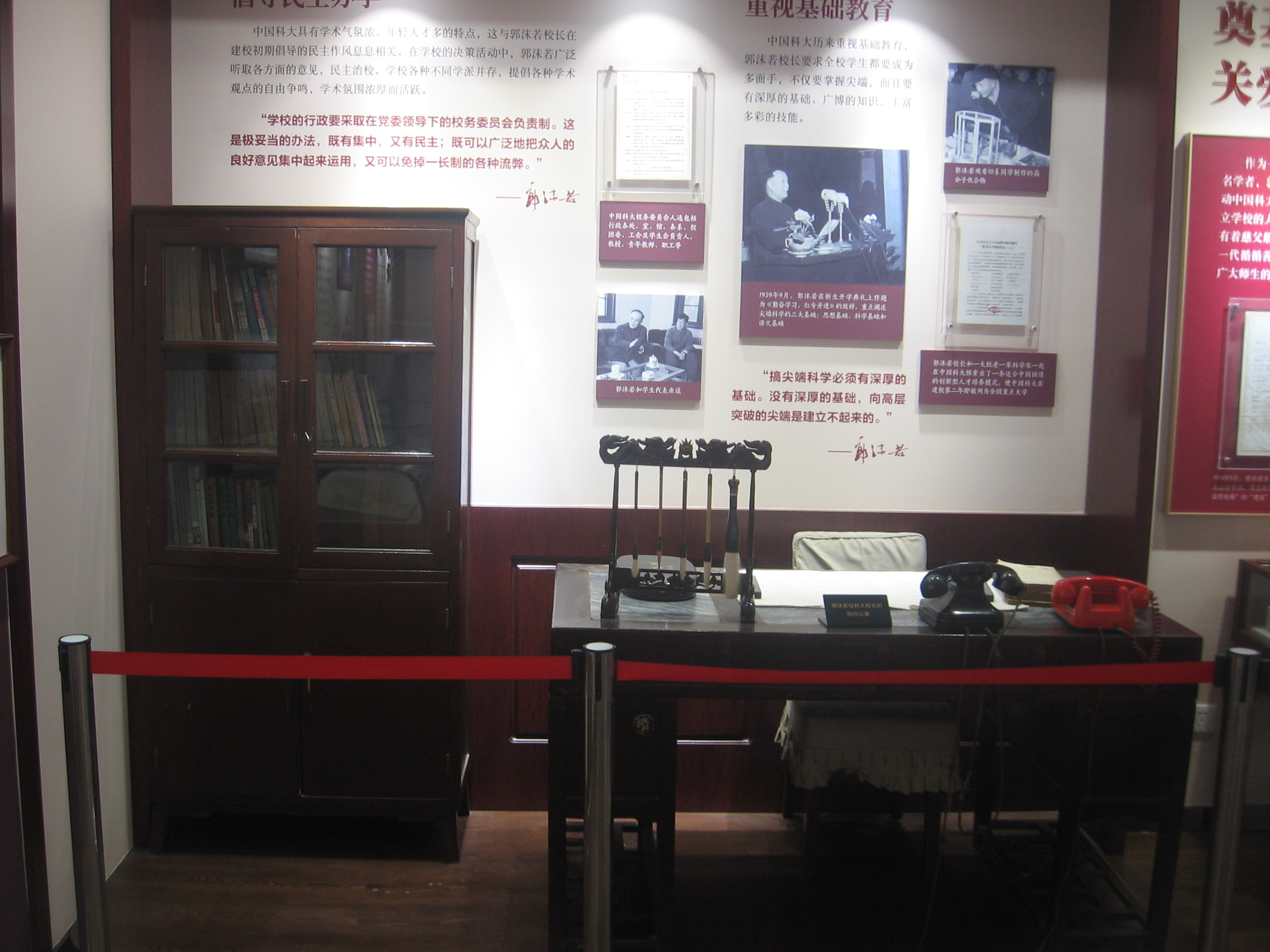
Guo Moruo's desk when he was the president of the University of Science and Technology of China, displayed at USTC History Museum.

Because of his loyalty to Mao, he survived the Cultural Revolution and received commendation by the chairman at the 9th National Congress of the Chinese Communist Party in April 1969. By the early 1970s, he had regained most of his influence. He enjoyed all the privileges of the highest-ranking party elites, including residence in a manor house once owned by a Qing official, a staff of assigned servants, a state limousine, and other perks. Guo also maintained a large collection of antique furniture and curios in his home.

In 1978, following Mao's death and the fall of the Gang of Four, the 85-year-old Guo, as he lay dying in a Beijing hospital, penned a poem denouncing the Gang.

什么令人振奋的消息！ (What wonderful news!)
删除四人帮。 (Rooting out the Gang of Four.)
文学流氓。 (The literary rogue.)
政治流氓。 (The political rogue.)
险恶的顾问。 (The sinister adviser.)
白骨精。 (The White-Boned Demon.)
所有由铁扫帚一扫而空。 (All swept away by the iron broom.)

The White-Boned Demon was a character in the Ming-era novel Journey to the West, an evil shapeshifting being, and was a popular derogatory nickname for Jiang Qing.

In March of the same year (1978), Guo defied illness to attend the First National Science Conference, the first of its kind to be held since the end of the Cultural Revolution. He was visibly frail and it would be the last time he was seen in public before his death three months later.

Guo was awarded the Stalin Peace Prize.

== Legacy ==
Guo was held in high regard in Chinese contemporary literature, history and archaeology. He once called himself the Chinese answer to Goethe and this appraisal was widely accepted. Zhou Yang said: "You are Goethe, but you are the Goethe of the New Socialist Era of China." ("你是歌德，但你是社会主义时代新中国的歌德。")

However, he has also been criticised. For example, he spoke highly of Mao Zedong's calligraphy, to the extent that he justified what the CCP leader had written mistakenly. His historical works have been described by some historians as "near-pseudohistorical" due to his alleged political manipulation of ancient Chinese classics. And during the Cultural Revolution, he published a book called Li Bai and Du Fu in which he praised Li Bai while belittling Du Fu, which was thought to flatter Mao Zedong. His attitude to the Gang of Four changed sharply before and after its downfall.

He is generally well-regarded in modern China. His actions during the Cultural Revolution are not commonly discussed, but some academics view him as a negative example of intellectual subservience and political flip-flopping.

In his private life, he was also known to have affairs with many women, whom he abandoned shortly afterwards. One of them, Li Chen (立忱), allegedly committed suicide after his betrayal, although this is disputed.

== Family ==
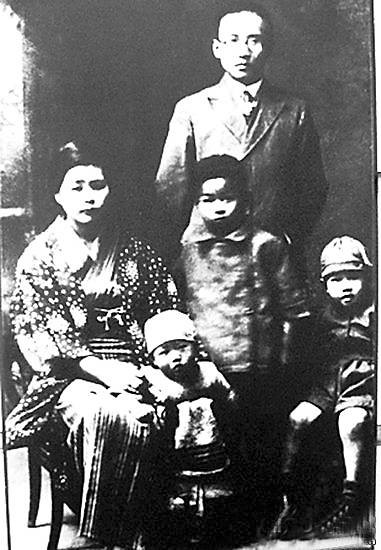
Guo Moruo and Sato Tomiko with their children

Guo had five children (four sons and a daughter) with Sato Tomiko and six with Yu Liqun (four sons and two daughters). An article published in the 2000s said that eight out of the eleven were alive, and that three have died.

With Sato Tomiko (listed chronologically in the order of birth):

- son Guo Hefu (郭和夫) (December 12 (or 31, according to other sources) 1917, Okayama - September 13, 1994). A chemist, he moved from Japan to Taiwan in 1946 and to mainland China in 1949. He was the founder of the Institute of Chemical Physics of the Chinese Academy of Sciences.
- son Guo Bo (郭博) (born 1920), a renowned architect and photographer. He came to China in 1955, invited by his father, and worked in Shanghai, where he participated in the design of many of its famous modern buildings. Guo Bu is also known as a photographer of Shanghai's heritage architecture; an album of his photographic work has been published as a book.
- son Guo Fusheng (郭福生).
- daughter Guo Shuyu (郭淑禹), a Japanese-language teacher, now deceased.
- son Guo Zhihong (郭志宏).

With Yu Liqun (listed chronologically in the order of birth):

- son Guo Hanying (郭汉英) (born 1941, Chongqing). An internationally published theoretical physicist.
- daughter Guo Shuying (郭庶英). She published a book about her father.
- son Guo Shiying (郭世英) (1942 - April 22, 1968). In 1962, while a philosophy student at Beijing University, he created an "underground" "X Poetry Society". In the summer of 1963 the society was exposed and deemed subversive. Guo Shiying was sentenced to re-education through labor. While working at a farm in Henan province, he developed interest in agriculture. Returning to Beijing in 1965, he enrolled at Beijing Agricultural University. In 1968, kidnapped by Red Guards and "tried" by their "court" for his poetry-society activity years before he jumped out of the window of the third-floor room where he was held and died at the age of 26. His father in his later writing expressed regret for encouraging his son to return to Beijing from the farm, thinking that it indirectly led to his death.
- son Guo Minying (郭民英), (November 1943, Chongqing - April 12, 1967). His death is described as an unexpected suicide.
- daughter Guo Pingying (郭平英)
- son Guo Jianying (郭建英) (born 1953).

== Commemoration ==
- Guo's residence in Beijing, near Shicha Lake (Shichahai), where he lived after the war with his second (or third, if the arranged marriage is to be counted) wife, Yu Liqun, is preserved as a museum.
- Guo and Sato Tomiko's house in Ichikawa, Chiba, Japan, where they lived from 1927 to 1937, is a museum as well. Due to the Guo Moruo connection, Ichikawa chose to establish sister city relations with Leshan in 1981.
- W.E.B. Du Bois dedicated his poem I Sing to China to Guo.

== Honours ==
- Iran – Commemorative Medal of the 2500th Anniversary of the founding of the Persian Empire (1971)

== Bibliography ==
This is a select bibliography. A fuller bibliography may be found in: A Selective Guide to Chinese Literature, 1900-1949, edited by Milena Doleželová-Velingerová et al.

=== Poetry, stories, novellas, plays ===
- 1921: Goddess: Songs and Poems (女神 : 劇曲詩歌集). English translation: Selected Poems from the Goddesses, A. C. Barnes and John Lester, tr., Beijing: Foreign Languages Press, 1958.
- 1926, 1932: Olives (橄榄), Shanghai: Chuangzao she chubanshe bu, 1929 (book series: Chuangzao she congshu).
- 1928, 1932: Fallen Leaves (落叶 : 沫若小说戏曲集), Shanghai : Xin zhong guo shu ju, 1932.
- 1936: Chu Yuan: Five Acts (屈原 : 五幕劇);. English translation: Chu Yuan: A Play in Five Acts, Yang Xianyi and Gladys Yang, tr., Beijing: Foreign Languages Press, 1953; 2nd edition, 1978; Honolulu: University Press of the Pacific, 2001.
- 1946: "Under the Moonlight", in: The China Magazine (formerly China at War), June 1946; reprinted in: Chi-Chen Wang, ed., Stories of China at War, Columbia University Press, 1947; reprinted: Westport, Conn. : Greenwood Press, 1975.
- 1947: Laughter Underground (地下的笑声), Shanghai and Beijing: Hai yan shu dian - selected stories.
- 1959: Red Flag Ballad (红旗歌谣), Beijing Shi: Hongqi zhazhi she (= Red Flag Magazine), 1959; English translation: Songs of the Red Flag, Yang Zhou, tr., Peking, Foreign Languages Press, 1961.

=== Autobiography ===
Guo wrote nine autobiographical works:

- 1947: My Youth (我的童年), Shanghai.
  - French translation: Autobiographie : mes années d'enfance, tr. Pierre Ryckmans, Paris, Gallimard, 1970.
  - German translation: Kindheit : Autobiographie, tr. Ingo Schäfer, Frankfurt am Main: Insel, 1981.
- Before and After the Revolution (Fanzheng qianhou).
- 1930, 1931: The Black Cat and the Tower (黑貓與塔), Shanghai, 1930. - often referred to just as Black Cat (黑貓).
- The First Outing of Kuimen (Chuchu Kuimen).
- My Student Years (Wode xuesheng shidai).
- 1932: Ten Years of Creation (创造十年), Shanghai : Xian dai shu ju, 1932.
- 1938: Sequel to Ten Years of Creation (创造 十 年 续编), Shanghai : Bei xin shuju. (book series: Chuangzuo xin kan).
- On the Road of the Northern Expedition (Beifa Tuci).
- 洪波曲 / Hongbo qu.

=== Historical, educational, and philosophical treatises ===
- 1935, rev. ed., 1957: 兩周金文辭大系圖彔攷釋 / Liang Zhou jin wen ci da xi tu lu kao shi (Corpus of Inscriptions on Bronzes from the Two Zhou [Chou] Dynasties), Beijing: Ke xue chu ban she, 1957 (考古学专刊. 甲种 = Archaeological monograph series).
- 1950: "Report on Culture and Education", in: The First Year of Victory, Peking, Foreign Languages Press.
- 1951: Culture and Education in New China, Peking : Foreign Languages Press, 1951 (joint authors: Chien Chun-jui, Liu Tsun-chi, Mei Tso, Hu Yu-chih, Coching Chu and Tsai Chu-sheng).
- 1982: 甲骨文合集 Jiaguwen Heji (Oracle Collection), Shanghai: Zhonghua shuju, 1978–1983, 13 volumes (edited with Hu Houxuan) - collection of 41,956 oracle bone inscriptions from Yinxu.

== Other nonfiction ==
- Appeal and Resolutions of the First Session of the World Peace Council : Berlin; February 21–26, 1951; Kuo Mo-jo's Speech at the World Peace Council, Peking: Foreign Languages Press, 1951.
- Kuo Mo-jo, "The Struggle for the Creation of New China's Literature" in: Zhou Enlai, The People's New Literature : Four Reports at the First All-China Conference of Writers and Artists, Peking: Cultural Press, 1951.

=== Translations ===
- 1922: J. W. von Goethe, Die Leiden des Jungen Werther (The Sorrows of Young Werther)
- 1924: Kawakami Hajime, Social Organization and Social Revolution
- 1924：Omar Khayyam，Rubaiyat
- 1925: Ivan Turgenev, Xin shi dai (Virgin Soil)
- 1926: Schiller, Wallenstein
- 1928: Friedrich Nietzsche, Also sprach Zarathustra (Thus Spake Zarathustra)
- 1928: J. W. von Goethe, Faust, I. Teil
- 1929: Upton Sinclair, Tu chang (The Jungle)
- 1931: Karl Marx, Kritik der Politischen Ökonomie (Capital: A Critique of Political Economy)
- 1935: Leo Tolstoy, Voina i mir (War and Peace)

=== Contributions ===
- 1974: Cho Wen-chün: A Play in Three Acts (abridged), in: Straw Sandals: Chinese Short Stories, 1918-1933, Harold R. Isaacs, ed., Cambridge, Mass.: MIT Press.

Academic offices
New title	President of the Chinese Academy of Sciences; 1949–1978	Succeeded by Fang Yi; Vacant until 1979
New title	President of the University of Science and Technology of China; 1958–1978	Succeeded by Yan Jici; Vacant until 1980
