= Tomiko Satō =

Japanese-Chinese wife of writer Guo Moruo

Tomiko Sato
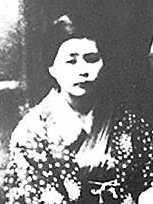
- Born: 佐藤をとみ (Otomi Sato); 3 October 1894; Ōhira, Kurokawa District, Miyagi Prefecture, Japan
- Died: 1995 (aged 100–101); Dalian, China
- Other name: Anna Guo
- Spouse: Guo Moruo
- Children: Guo Hefu (1917–1994); Guo Bo (b. 1920); Guo Fusheng; Guo Shuyu; Guo Zhihong

Tomiko Satō (佐藤 富子, Satō Tomiko; 3 October 1894 – 1995) was the common-law wife of the Chinese Communist scholar and poet Guo Moruo. She is often referred to in Chinese sources as Guo Anna (Chinese: 郭安娜), the way Guo Moruo called her. Satō Tomiko spent about 20 years with Guo, in Japan and in China, until they were separated by the war, and they had five children together.

== Biography ==
Tomiko Satō was the eldest of eight children in the family of a Japanese Protestant minister in the Ōhira village, Kurokawa District, Miyagi Prefecture (north-eastern Honshū). In her teens she studied at a Baptist boarding school in Sendai, the capital of the prefecture. At 21, rebelling against the prospect of an arranged marriage, she left her home prefecture and went to Tokyo, where she found a job with St Luke's Hospital as a student nurse.

Satō's relationship with Guo Moruo started in the summer of 1916, about a year after her arrival to Tokyo. A friend of Guo, named Chen Longji (陈龙骥), happened to be treated for tuberculosis at St Luke's Hospital. Guo, who had just completed his first year of study in Japan, visited his sick friend in the hospital on his trip to Tokyo, but the patient died soon. After the death of his friend, Guo met her when visiting the hospital to request the dead friend's X-ray records. Satō was sharing Guo's grief over the death of his friend, and once Guo returned to Okayama, they started regularly exchange letters. By December, Guo Moruo convinced Satō to leave Tokyo and join him in Okayama.

Satō and Guo had their first child, a son, in December 1917.

Satō and Guo's union was vehemently opposed by both of their families, and ill-received by the community they were in.

In April 1923, Satō moved with Guo and their three children to Shanghai. They had financial difficulties, and in February 1924 she went to Japan, taking the children along, but returned to Shanghai in mid-November. Guo was very active in the Communist underground movement. The Nationalist Government put out an arrest warrant for Guo in 1928. He escaped to Japan again and lived with Sato for ten years. But they were under constant Japanese surveillance.

=== War years ===
After the Marco Polo Bridge Incident in July 1937, the war between China and Japan started in earnest. On July 25, Guo managed to escape Japan and to return to China where his arrest warrant was rescinded. As his attempts to get Sato and their children out of Japan later that year were frustrated by the Japanese government, she was left alone to take care of the children in wartime Japan. She had little money and lived a marginal life with the children. She resisted the pressure of the authorities to have them naturalized as Japanese citizens; this protected them from the prospect of being conscripted and possibly sent to fight against their father's country. The four elder children were able to enter Kyoto Imperial University; all graduated, and became specialists in industrial chemistry, aquaculture, architecture, and mathematics. The youngest child was educated at Qinghua University in Beijing.

=== Postwar years ===
After WWII she tried to contact Guo. He avoided all attempts to meet. She discovered that he had taken another wife and had had several more children. She wrote long letters to his close friends whom she knew from their earlier years. In 1949 Zhou Enlai arranged for her to live in Dalian, China. She became a Chinese citizen. In 1983 she was appointed to the Sixth CPPCC National Committee and served consecutively thereafter. She finally saw Guo Moruo for the last time shortly before he died in 1978 in his hospital.

When interviewed in 1980 by Hisae Sawachi, who was to write her biography, Satō summarized her life story as follows: "I am a stray dog all my life, but whatever bitterness can be said about this bitter life, that was because of my own foolishness". She died in 1995, aged 101.

=== Children ===
All her children achieved successful lives in China.

- Eldest son Guo HeFu 郭和夫 (1917–1994), Member of Academica Sinica in Chemistry. She lived with him in Dalian.
- Guo Bo 郭博 (1920-), architect, cinematographer and member of various professional and Shanghai institutions including the Soong Ching Ling Foundation 宋庆龄基金会理事.
- Guo FuSheng 郭复生 (亦叫佛生, 1923-), Chinese Academy of Science.
- Daughter Guo ShuZhen 郭淑瑀 (1925-). She married Lin AiSin 林爱信 and had a daughter Lin Cong 林丛 who studied in Japan. She became a Japanese citizen and now teaches in Japan as Rina Fujita 藤田梨那.
- Youngest son Guo ZhiHong 郭志鸿 (1932-2024), Visiting professor at Central Conservatory of Music 中央音乐学院客座教授.

== Bibliography ==
- Sato, Tomiko (1938). Waga masurao kaku matsujaku 我的丈夫郭沫若 [My husband Mo Ruo]. Shanghai: Nisshinsha. ASIN B000JAJY8U. OCLC 674273223.
  - 佐藤富子 (1938). Wo de zhang fu guo mo ruo 我的丈夫郭沫若 [My husband Mo Ruo]. Zhan shi wen hua cong shu cong shu wai ji. Zuodeng Fuzi zhu. Hankou: 戰時文化出版社 [Zhan shi wen hua chu ban she]. OCLC 759098729.
- 佐藤富子 Sato, Tomiko (2016). 回到中国的郭沫若 [Memories of Mo Ruo in China]. 郭沫若学刊 [Journal of Go-Moruo Studies] (in Chinese) (2). Translated by 赵艺真: 33–38. ISSN 1003-7225.
