= Guo Moruo Residence =

Coordinates: 39.9345°N 116.3892°E

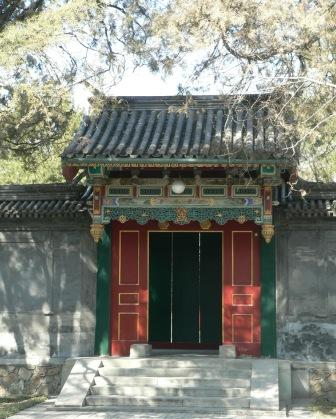
One of the entrances to the house museum

The Guo Moruo Residence (郭沫若故居) is the former residence of Guo Moruo (1892–1978) in West Qianhai Street, Dongcheng District, Beijing, China.

== History ==
The location of the house used to be the former site of the garden of Heshen (1746–99), an influential official who lived in the reign of the Qianlong Emperor during the Qing dynasty. The place later became a stud farm for the horses of Prince Gong (1833–98). Guo Moruo lived there from 1963 until his death in 1978. The house preserves documents which belonged to Guo Moruo such as manuscripts and books.
