= Hu Houxuan =

Chinese historian (1911–1995)

Hu Houxuan (Chinese: 胡厚宣, 1911–1995) was a Chinese historian, chief editor and a contributor of the Jiaguwen Heji Shiwen (甲骨文合集释文), the modern Chinese transcriptions of the most comprehensive collection of the oracle bone inscriptions. For 26 years, since 1956, he led the editorial team of the Jiaguwen Heji, a monumental collection of over 40,000 pieces of inscribed oracle bones and a milestone in the history of the oracle bone studies. Hu Houxuan was the mentor of Professor Qiu Xigui of Fudan University in China and a leading historian of the Institute of History of the Chinese Academy of Social Sciences.
