= Jiaguwen Heji =

Comprehensive collection of oracle bone rubbings

- Editors: Guo Moruo, Hu Houxuan
- Original title: 甲骨文合集
- Language: Chinese
- Subject: oracle bone inscriptions
- Publisher: Zhonghua Book Company
- Publication date: 1978–1982
- Publication place: China
- Media type: Print
- ISBN: 7-5004-2521-X volume 1
- Original text: 甲骨文合集 at Internet Archive

Jiaguwen Heji
- Chinese: 甲骨文合集
- Literal meaning: shell bone writing collection
Transcriptions
Standard Mandarin
- Hanyu Pinyin: Jiǎgǔwén héjí
- Wade–Giles: Chia-ku-wen ho-chi

Jiaguwen Heji, abbreviated Heji or HJ, is the standard comprehensive collection of rubbings of ancient Chinese oracle bone inscriptions.

== Compilation ==
Under the last nine kings of the Shang dynasty (up to c. 1046 BC), pieces of bone, usually plastrons of tortoises or scapula of oxen, were used in pyromantic divination and then inscribed. The used oracle bones were deposited in pits at the Shang cult centre now known as Yinxu (near modern Anyang, Hebei) and forgotten for millennia. After Wang Yirong discovered in 1899 that ancient bone fragments on sale for medicinal purposes bore an early form of Chinese characters, there was great interest in these bones. Local farmers dug up at least nine caches containing about 100,000 fragments, which were sold to collectors, both Chinese and foreign. Scientific excavation of the Yinxu site began in 1928, and about 30,000 more pieces were recovered.

As a result, fragments of the bones were divided between collections across the world and within China. More than 150 catalogues of different collections were produced, often with ink rubbings of the inscriptions, but sometimes with only line drawings. Hu Houxuan had worked on oracle bones since the 1930s, and began collecting rubbings from all the collections he visited. On joining the Institute of History at the Chinese Academy of Social Sciences in 1956, he submitted a proposal to compile a comprehensive collection of rubbings of these inscriptions. Beginning in April 1961, a team led by Hu collected rubbings from existing catalogues and made new rubbings of all the bones they could find. They then classified the 200,000 pieces, eliminating duplicates and fakes and joining fragments that had originally come from the same piece.

The work was interrupted by the Cultural Revolution in 1966, when Hu's team were sent to the countryside, though Hu himself remained in Beijing, where he was required to study Mao Zedong Thought. Through the intervention of Guo Moruo, head of the academy and a renowned oracle bone scholar, the materials they had collected were hidden in a cave near Xi'an to save them from destruction. Guo was also instrumental in obtaining permission for Hu to resume the project in 1970, initially in combination with political studies. Publication of the 13-volume work began with volumes 2 and 3 in 1978 and concluded with volume 1 in 1982. Guo (who had died in 1978) was credited as zhǔbiān (主編/主编) and Hu as zǒngbiānjí (總編輯/总编辑), both terms meaning 'editor-in-chief'.

== Contents ==
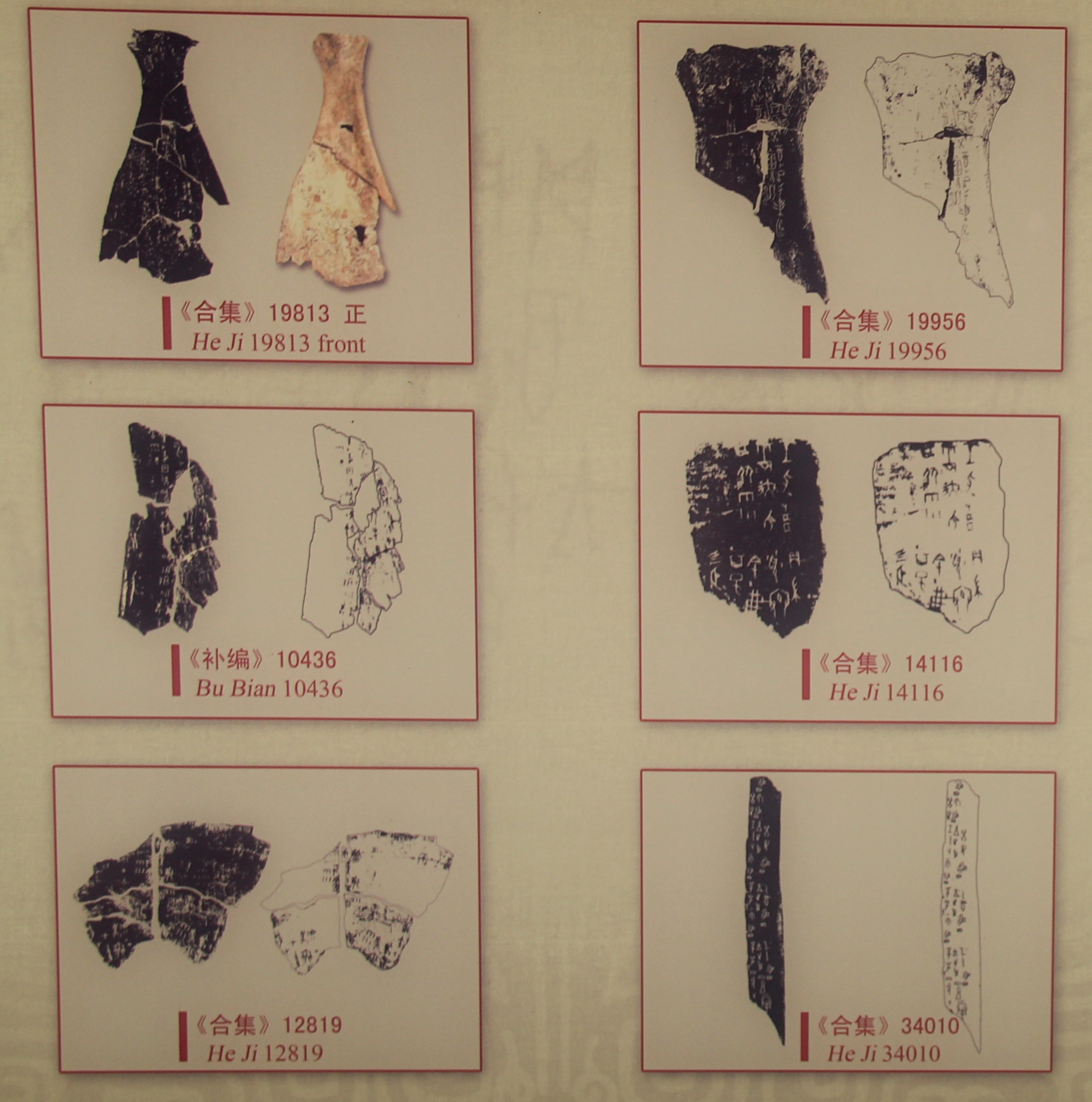
Rubbings (from Heji and its supplement) with photographs or drawings of the same pieces

The collection includes only oracle bones recovered from the Yinxu site since 1899, and thus excludes the small number found at other sites. Small or badly damaged fragments were not included unless they were particularly significant. In this way, the compilers winnowed their huge collection down to 41,956 items.

The rubbings are grouped first according to Dong Zuobin's oracle bone periods:

- Period I (Wu Ding): volumes 1–6
- pieces from three diviner groups originally assigned by Dong to period IV but now believed by most scholars to date from late in period I: volume 7
- Period II (Zu Geng and Zu Jia): volume 8
- Period III (Lin Xin and Geng Ding): volume 9 and part of volume 10
- Period IV (Wu Yi and Wen Wu Ding): rest of volumes 10 and volume 11
- Period V (Di Yi and Di Xin): volume 12

Within each period, rubbings are grouped by subject, with four main sections and 21 subsections:

- class and state (階級和國家/阶级和国家 jiējí hé guójiā)
  - slaves and commoners (奴隸和平民/奴隶和平民 xiǎo lèi núlì hé píngmín)
  - slave-owner lords (奴隸主貴族/奴隶主贵族 núlì zhǔ guìzú)
  - officials (官吏 guānlì)
  - army (軍隊/军队 jūnduì), punishments (刑罰/刑罚 xíngfá), prisons (監獄/监狱 jiānyù)
  - warfare (戰爭/战争 zhànzhēng)
  - border states (方域 fāng yù)
  - tribute (貢納/贡纳 gòng nà)
- social production (社會生產/社会生产 shèhuì shēngchǎn)
  - agriculture (農業/农业 nóngyè)
  - fishing and hunting (漁獵/渔猎 yúliè), livestock (畜牧xùmù)
  - handicraft (手工业 shǒugōngyè)
  - commerce (商業/商业 shāngyè), transport (交通 jiāotōng)
- intellectual culture (科學文化/科学文化 kēxué wénhuà)
  - astronomy (天文 tiānwén), calendar (曆法/历法 lìfǎ)
  - weather (氣象/气象 qìxiàng)
  - architecture (建筑 jiànzhú)
  - sickness (疾病 jíbìng)
  - childbearing (生育 shēngyù)
  - worship of spirits and gods (鬼神崇拜 guǐshén chóngbài)
  - sacrifices (祭祀 jìsì)
  - good and bad omens (吉兇夢幻/吉凶梦幻 jíxiōng mènghuàn)
  - divination (卜法 bǔfǎ)
  - writing (文字 wénzì)
- miscellaneous (其他 qítā)

Volume 13 contains hand-drawings of pieces for which no rubbings were available, arranged in the same way as the first 12 volumes.

== Auxiliary works ==
Hu and his team also produced works to facilitate the use and navigation of the Heji: Transcriptions of all the inscriptions in Heji in conventional Chinese characters with punctuation are provided by:

- Hu, Houxuan; Wang, Yuxin, eds. (1999), Jiǎgǔwén héjí shìwén 甲骨文合集释文 [Transcriptions of Jiaguwen heji], Shehui kexue, ISBN 7-5004-2521-X. (contains transcriptions of all the inscriptions in Heji in conventional Chinese characters with punctuation)
- Hu, Houxuan, ed. (1999), Jiǎgǔwén héjí cáiliào láiyuán biǎo 甲骨文合集材料來源表 [Source lists for Jiaguwen heji], Shehui kexue, ISBN 7-5004-2522-8. (provides cross-references with the source catalogues)

== Supplement ==
Further bones were published in a supplement, abbreviated Hebu or HB:

- Peng, Bangjiong, ed. (1999), Jiǎgǔwén héjí bǔbiān 甲骨文合集补编 [Supplement to Jiaguwen heji], Yuwen, ISBN 7-80126-496-7.

The first four volumes contain 13,450 further pieces from Anyang, grouped in the same way as in Heji. There are also 316 pieces from other sites grouped by site, 309 of them from the pre-conquest Zhou and 7 from sites in Henan. The remaining three volumes contain transcriptions of the pieces, source lists, recombining tables and a bibliography. As well as collating sources published since the Heji, the supplement includes 7000 previously unpublished pieces, most of them small fragments with few characters. It also corrects a number of errors of periodization and recombination in the Heji.
