= Ken-ichi Takashima =

Japanese academic

Ken-ichi Takashima (髙嶋謙一 Takashima Ken'ichi; born 1939) is, according to the editors of the Thesaurus Linguae Sinicae, "the world's leading authority on Shang dynasty oracle bone inscriptions".

== Biography ==
Takashima was born in Tokyo, he studied under Fr. Paul L-M. Serruys, C.I.C.M. at University of Washington, graduating in 1973. After a short stint at the University of Arizona, he spent his whole career as a professor at University of British Columbia, where he remains an emeritus professor. He has also held visiting posts at Tokyo University, Anhui University, and Erlangen.

== Bibliography ==
=== Books ===
- Takashima, Ken-ichi 高嶋謙一. 1985. Yinxu wenzi bingbian tongjian 殷虛文字丙編通檢 (A Concordance to Fascicle Three of Inscriptions from the Yin Ruins). Taipei: Institute of History and Philology, Academia Sinica, 1985.
- 1994. Kōkotsumoji jishaku sōran 甲骨文字字釋綜覧 (A Comprehensive Guide to Interpretations of Oracle-Bone Graphs). (Tokyo: University of Tokyo Press 東京大學出版會, December, 1994). Co-author: Michio Matsumaru 松丸道雄. 723 pp. + xi. Folio size.
- Takashima, Ken-ichi 高嶋謙一 and Itō Michiharu 伊藤道治. 1996. Studies in Early Chinese Civilization: Religion, Society, Language and Palaeography. 2 vols. Hirakata: Kansai Gaidai University Press. Part I: Religion and Society (pp. 1–178, Vol 1) is by Itō, and Part II: Language and Palaeography (pp. 179–505, Vol. 1) is by Takashima.
- 2004. Meaning and Form: Essays in Pre-Modern Chinese Grammar. (362 + 5pp.). Co-editor: Jiang Shaoyu (responsible for papers written in Chinese, 125pp.) München: Lincom Europa, 2004.
- 2005. Zhong Ying duizhao Jiaguwen jinyi leijian 中英對照 甲骨文今譯類檢. (700 + 15pp.) Co-translator: Zhang Deshao 張德邵. Ed. by Liu Zhiji 劉志基, Zhang Deshao 張德邵, Takashima Ken-ichi 高嶋謙一, Zang Kehe 臧克和. Other contributors: Liu Xueshun 劉學順, Chen Tingzhu 陳婷珠, Zhang Zaixing 張再興. Nanning: Guangxi jiaoyu chubanshe 廣西教育出版社.
- 2009. Takashima, Ken-ichi 高嶋謙一 with Jing Zhichun 荊志純 and Tang Jigen 唐際根. 2009d. Ed. Duowei shiyu — Shang wangchao yu Zhongguo zaoqi wenming yanjiu 多維視域 — 商王朝與中國早期文明研究. Beijing: Kexue chubanshe 科學出版社.
- 2010. Studies of Fascicle Three of Inscriptions from the Yin Ruins, Volume I: General Notes, Text and Translations. (817 + 26pp.) With translations up to plastron #259 by Paul L-M. Serruys. Taipei: Institute of History and Philology, Academia Sinica. Special Publications No. 107A.
- 2010. Studies of Fascicle Three of Inscriptions from the Yin Ruins, Volume II: New Palaeographical and Philological Commentaries. (734 + 4pp.) Taipei: Institute of History and Philology, Academia Sinica. Special Publications No. 107B.
- 2011. Selected Writings of Ken-ichi Takashima (in Chinese). 323 + 6pp. Collection of the Studies on Chinese Language and Writing at Anhui University, Series 2: Volume of Ken-ichi Takashima. 安徽大学汉语言文字研究丛刊（第二辑）——高岛谦一卷. Hefei: Anhui University Press.
- 2013. Selected Writings of Ken-ichi Takashima (in Chinese). 323 + 6pp. Collection of the Studies on Chinese Language and Writing, Anhui University, Series 2: Volume of Ken-ichi Takashima. 安徽大学汉语言文字研究丛书（第二辑） 高嶋謙一卷. Hefei: Anhui University Press.

=== Articles ===
- Takashima Ken-Ichi. 1970–71. “Prolegomena to the study of the earliest Chinese transcriptions of Japanese.” Monumenta Serica Vol. 29, (1970–1971), pp. 228–263
- Takashima, Ken-ichi. 1973. Negatives in the King Wu Ting Bone Inscriptions. Ph.D. dissertation. Seattle: University of Washington.
- Takashima, Ken-ichi. 1977. “Subordinate Structure in Oracle-Bone Inscriptions: With Particular Reference to the Particle Ch’i,” Monumenta Serica, XXXIII, pp. 36–61.
- Takashima, Ken-ichi. 1978. “Decipherment of the Word Yu 悃/躁/有 in the Shang Oracle-Bone Inscriptions and in Pre-Classical Chinese,” Early China, 4, pp. 19–29.
- Takashima, Ken-ichi. 1979. “Some Philological Notes to Sources of Shang History,” Early China, 5, pp. 48–55.
- Takashima Ken-ichi 高嶋謙一. 1980. “Fu Kō no shippei ni kansuru ichi bokuji no shishaku” 帚好の疾病に關する一卜辭の試釋, Kōkotsugaku 甲骨學, No. 12, pp. 55–65.
- Takashima, Ken-ichi. 1980a. “The Early Archaic Chinese Word Yu in the Shang Oracle-Bone Inscriptions: Word Family, Etymology, Grammar, Semantics and Sacrifice,” Cahiers de Linguistique, Asie Orientale, No. 8, pp. 81–112.
- Takashima, Ken-ichi. 1984–85. “Noun Phrases in the Oracle-Bone Inscriptions,” Monumenta Serica, Vol. XXXVI, pp. 229–302.
- Takashima, Ken-ichi 高嶋謙一. 1984a. “Wen ding” 問鼎, Guwenzi yanjiu 古文字研究, 9, pp. 75–95.
- Takashima, Ken-ichi 高嶋謙一. 1984b. “Nominalization and Nominal Derivation with Particular Reference to the Language of Oracle-Bone Inscriptions,” Papers in East Asian Languages (Honolulu: Department of East Asian Languages and Literatures, University of Hawaii), Vol. 2, pp. 25–74.
- Takashima, Ken-ichi. 1985. “On the Quantitative Complement in Oracle-Bone Inscriptions,” Journal of Chinese Linguistics, Vol. 13, No. 1, pp. 44–68.
- Takashima, Ken-ichi 高嶋謙一. 1987. “Settling the Cauldron in the Right Place,” Papers Presented to Wang Li on His Eightieth Birthday (Hong Kong: Joint Publishing Co.), pp. 405–421.
- Takashima, Ken-ichi 高嶋謙一. 1988a. “An Emphatic Verb Phrase in the Oracle-Bone Inscriptions,” Bulletin of the Institute of History and Philology, Vol. 59, Pt. 3 (In Memory of Dr. Fang Kuei Li), pp. 653–694.
- Takashima Ken-ichi 高嶋謙一. 1988b. “Morphology of the Negatives in Oracle-Bone Inscriptions,” Computational Analysis of Asian and African Languages (Tokyo: National Inter-University Research Institute of Asian and African Languages and Cultures), No. 30, pp. 113–133.
- Takashima Ken-ichi 高嶋謙一. 1988c. “Kōkotsubun no jidai kubun to sono shoseki ni tsuite” 甲骨文の時代區分とその書蹟について, Shodō kenkyū 書道研究, 12, pp. 58–80.
- Takashima Ken-ichi 高嶋謙一. 1989. “Indai teiboku gengo no honshitsu” 殷代貞卜言語の本質, Tokyo daigaku tōyō bunka kenkyūsho kiyō 東京大學東洋文化研究所紀要, No. 110, pp. 1–110.
- Takashima Ken-ichi 高嶋謙一. 1989a. “Jiaguwen zhong de binglian mingci leyu” 甲骨文中的幷聯名詞仂語, Guwenzi yanjiu 古文字研究, 17, pp. 338–356.
- Takashima Ken-ichi 高嶋謙一. 1989b. “Jiaguwen zhong foudingci de gouci xingtai” 甲骨文中否定辞的構詞形態, Yinxu bowuyuan yuankan (chuangkan) 殷墟博物苑苑刊(創刊) (Beijing: Zhongguo shehui kexue chubanshe), pp. 209–16.
- Takashima, Ken-ichi 高嶋謙一. 1990. “A Study of the Copulas in Shang Chinese,” The Memoirs of the Institute of Oriental Culture (University of Tokyo), No. 112, pp. 1–92.
- Takashima, Ken-ichi. 1994. “The Modal and Aspectual Particle Qi in Shang Chinese,” Papers of the First International Congress on Pre-Qin Chinese Grammar, pp. 479–565. Ed. by Robert H. Gassmann and He Leshi 何樂士. Changsha: Yuelu shushe 岳麓書社.
- Takashima, Ken-ichi. 1996. “Toward a New Pronominal Hypothesis of Qi in Shang Chinese,” Chinese Language, Thought, and Culture: Nivison and His Critics, pp. 3–38. Ed. by Philip J. Ivanhoe. Chicago and La Salle: Open Court.
- Takashima Ken-ichi 高嶋謙一. 1996a. “Some Problematic Aspects of the Li KUEI Inscription,” Ancient Chinese and Southeast Asian Bronze Age Cultures (Proceedings of a Conference held at the Edith and Joy London Foundation property, Kioloa, NSW. 8–12 February 1988), pp. 345–390. Ed. by F. David Bulbeck with several edited and translated by Noel Barnard. Taipei: SMC Publishing Inc.
- Takashima, Ken-ichi. 1997a. “Focus and Explanation in Copulative-type Sentences in a Genuine Classical Chinese Text,” Cahiers de Linguistique Asie Orientale, Vol. 26, No. 2, pp. 177–199.
- Takashima Ken-ichi 高嶋謙一. 1998. “Youguan jiaguwen de shidai qufen he biji” 有關甲骨文的時代區分和筆跡, Hu Houxuan xiansheng jinian wenji 胡厚宣先生紀念文集 (Beijing: Kexue chubanshe 科學出版社), pp. 64–86.
- Takashima Ken-ichi 高嶋謙一. 1999. “Jiaguwen kaoshi de jige jiben buzhou” 甲骨文考釋的幾個基本步驟, Hanyu xianzhuang yu lishi de yanjiu 漢語現狀與歷史的研究, pp. 446–469. Ed. by Jiang Lansheng 江藍生 • Hou Jingyi 侯精一. Beijing: Zhongguo shehui kexue chubanshe.
- Takashima, Ken-ichi. 1999a. “The So-Called ‘Third Person’ Possessive Pronoun jue 丑 (= 厥) in Classical Chinese,” Journal of the American Oriental Society, Vol. 119, No. 3, pp. 404-431.
- Takashima, Ken-ichi. 2000. "Towards a More Rigorous Methodology of Deciphering Oracle-Bone Inscriptions," T'oung Pao 通報: Revue Internationale de Sinologie (Collège de France). Vol. 86, No. 4/5 (Dec 2000), pp. 363–399.
- Takashima, Ken-ichi. 2000. "Evidence of Possible Dialect Mixture in Oracle-Bone Inscriptions." Co-author: Anne O. Yue. In Memory of Professor Li Fang-kuei: Essays of Linguistic Change and the Chinese Dialects, pp. 1–52. Ed. by Ting Pang-hsin and Anne O. Yue. Taipei and Seattle: Institute of Linguistics (Preparatory Office), Academia Sinica 中央研究院 and University of Washington, 2000.
- Takashima, Ken-ichi. 2001. "A Cosmography of Shang Oracle-Bone Graphs." Actes du Colloque International Commémorant le Centenaire de la Découverte des Inscriptions sur os et carapaces, pp. 37–62. Paris: Centre Recherche Linguistiques sur l'Asie Orientale, Ecole des Hautes Etudes en Sciences Sociales, September, 2001.
- Takashima, Ken-ich. 2001. "A Study of the Deictic Word jue (丑 = 厥) in the Bronze Inscriptions and Book of Documents," Collection des Cahiers de Linguistique Asie Orientale 6: Collected Essays in Ancient Chinese Grammar (Centre de Recherches Linguistiques sur l'Asie Orientale, Ecole des Hautes Etudes en Sciences Sociales. August, 2001), pp. 129–160. 2000
- Takashima, Ken-ichi. 2002. "Some Ritual Verbs in Shang Texts." Journal of Chinese Linguistics 中國語言學報, Vol. 30, No. 1, pp. 97–141.
- Takashima, Ken-ichi. 2002. "賓"字被動用法之考察 (An Examination of the Passive Use of the Word Bin 賓 'to entertain')." Journal of Chinese Palaeography (Guwenzi yanjiu 古文字研究), No. 24, pp. 76–86.
- Takashima, Ken-ichi. 2003. “Hanyu beidongshi zhi qiyuan 漢語被動式之起源," Shang Chengzuo jiaoshou bainian danchen jinian wenji 商承祚教授百年誕辰紀念文集 (Beijing: Wenwu chubanshe), pp. 363–386.
- Takashima, Ken-ichi. 2004. "How to Read Shang Oracle-Bone Inscriptions: A Critique of the Current Method," Bulletin of the Museum of Far Eastern Antiquities, 76, pp. 5–26.
- Takashima Ken-ichi 高嶋謙一. 2004. "Shi bin 釋賓" (Palaeographical Interpretation of Bin) (in Chinese), Wenzixue luncong 文字學論叢 (Essays in the Study of Writing), Vol. 2 (Wuhan: Chongwen shuju), 2004, pp. 259–283.
- Takashima, Ken-ichi. 2005. "[retro.seals.ch/cntmng?pid=ast-002:2005:59::1425 Placement of Inscriptions on Oracle-Bone Plastrons as a Guide to Decipherment," Asiatic Studien, LIX, 1, pp. 1–19.
- Takashima, Ken-ichi. 2006. "Some Linguistic Aspects of the Shang and Early Western Zhou Bronze Inscriptions." In Studies in Chinese Language and Culture: Festschrift in Honour of the 60th Birthday Christoph Harbsmeier (Oslo: Hermes Academic Publishing and Bookshop), 13–30.
- Takashima, Ken-ichi. 2006. "The Graph [日] for the Word ′Time′ in the Zhou Bronze Inscriptions." Linguistic Studies in Chinese Language and Neighboring Languages: Festschrift in Honor or Professor Pang-hsin Ting on His 70th Birthday (Taipei: Institute of Linguistics, Academia Sinica), pp. 305–317.
- Takashima, Ken-ichi. 2007. "Shi (On the Interpretation of )," Bulletin of Chinese Linguistics (中國語言學集刊), 2.2, pp. 35–41.
- Takashima, Ken-ichi. 2007. "The Graph 亀 for the Word 'Time' in Shang Oracle-Bone Inscriptions." Bulletin of Chinese Linguistics (Seattle: Li Fang-kuei Society for Chinese Linguistics and Hong Kong: Center for Chinese Linguistics, Hong Kong University of Science and Technology), 1.1, pp. 61–78.
- Takashima, Ken-ichi. 2009. "Jisi 祭祀: A Reconstruction of the Ji Sacrifice and the Si Ritual in Ancient China." Time and Ritual in Early China, pp. 33–68. Ed. by Xiaobing Wang-Riese and Thomas O. Höllmann. Wiesbaden: Otto Harrassowitz. Wiesbaden: Otto Harrassowitz.
- Takashima, Ken-ichi. 2010. "Gudai Hanyu zhong de ′ri zhong′ he ′zhong ri′" 古代漢語中的"日中"和"中日"("ri zhong" and "zhong ri" in Classical Chinese), Lü Shuxiang xiansheng bainian danchen jinian wenji 呂叔湘先生百年誕辰紀年文集 (A Collection of Essays in Honor of the Centennial Anniversary of Professor Lü Shuxiang), pp. 259–266. Beijing: Shangwu yinshuguan 商務印書館.
- Takashima, Ken-ichi. 2010. "A Reconstruction of Shang Joint Rituals," Festschrift Dedicated to the 73rd Birthday of Professor Jerry Norman, pp. 453–472. Ed. by Anne O. Yue and Samuel H-N. Cheung. Hong Kong: Institute of Chinese Civilization, Chinese University of Hong Kong.
- Takashima, Ken-ichi. 2009. "Shangdai yuyanzhong dai 'zuo'zi de shiyi jiegou" 商代語言中帶 "乍" (作) 字的使役結構, He Leshi jinian wenji 何樂士紀念文集 (Beijing: Yuyan chubanshe), pp. 67–90.
- Takashima, Ken-ichi. 2011. "Shangdai Hanyu houzhui *-s zhi sanzhong gongneng" 商代漢語後綴 *-s 之三種功能, Yuyan wenzi yu wenxue quanshi duoyuan duihua 語言文字與文學詮釋多元對話, pp. 3–21. Ed. by Zhu Qixiang 朱歧祥 and Zhou Shizhen 周世箴. Tai-chung: Department of Chinese, Tung-hai University.
- Takashima, Ken-ichi. 2011. "′Ka′ no gogen to Chūgoku komonjigaku" 河の語源と中國古文字學, Kaipian 開篇, Vol. 30, pp. 1–28.
- Takashima, Ken-ichi. 2011. "Zhengzhou, Daxinzhuang bugu: Yin-Shang shiqi Anyang nanbu, dongbu de wenzi" 鄭州、大辛庄卜骨：殷商時期安陽南部、東部的文字, Yinxu yu Shang wenhua: Yinxu kexue fajue 80 zhounian jinian wenji 殷墟與商文化──殷墟科學發掘80周年紀念文集, pp. 337–362. Beijing: Kexue chubanshe 科學出版社.
- Takashima, Ken-ichi. 2012. "Etymology and Palaeography of the Yellow River Hé," Journal of Chinese Linguistics, Vol. 40, No. 2 (2012), pp. 269–306.
- Takashima, Ken-ichi. 2012. "Literacy to the South and East of Anyang in Shang China: Zhengzhou and Daxinzhuang," Writing and Literacy in Early China, pp. 138–172. Ed. by David Branner and Li Feng. Seattle: University of Washington Press, 2012.
