= Jeremy Noble (musicologist) =

English musicologist and critic (1930–2017)

- Born: 27 March 1930; London, England, UK
- Died: 30 June 2017 (aged 87); London, England, UK
- Education: University of Oxford
- Known for: Scholarship on Josquin des Prez
- Notable credits: The Times; The Sunday Telegraph

Academic work
- Discipline: Early music
- Institutions: University of Birmingham; University at Buffalo

Jeremy Noble (27 March 1930 – 30 June 2017) was an English musicologist and music critic who specialized in classical music. His career comprised two fields, musicological scholarship and music criticism. In the former, he focused on early English music, Venetian music and particularly the life and work of Renaissance composer Josquin des Prez. His colleague Stanley Sadie noted that "Although only a fraction of his research has been published, the breadth and depth of his knowledge and his generosity towards fellow scholars have made him an important participant in late 20th-century musicology."

As an "acute and often acerbic critic," Noble held posts at The Times and The Sunday Telegraph.

== Life and career ==
Jeremy Noble was born on 27 March 1930 in London. His father James Noble was the son of South African missionaries, while his mother Avis "came from Cornish farming stock". After attending the Aldenham School, Jeremy Noble had a brief stint in the Intelligence Corps of Allied-occupied Austria. He read Greats at the Worcester College of the University of Oxford from 1949 to 1953.

Noble developed an interest in music during university and published a series of essays on the English Renaissance and Baroque music during the 1950s. In the former topic he studied British music theorists active from 1100 to 1700 and English church music from 1400 to the English Reformation. His interests gradually broadened to also include 16th and 17th-century Venetian music and particularly the life and work of Josquin des Prez. In researching Josquin's biography, he conducted substantial archival research and later served on the editorial board for the New Josquin Edition which began publication in 1994. Noble wrote the music section of Josquin's Grove Music Online (formerly in The New Grove Dictionary of Music and Musicians) article, and cowrote the chapter on Josquin with Gustave Reese in The New Grove High Renaissance Masters.

Though he published little, his The Telegraph obituary noted that "anyone working in the field of Renaissance music was in his debt for the groundbreaking work he did in the field, and aware of his vast corpus of research notes which, if put in order, would fill several volumes". The musicologist Stanley Sadie commented that "the breadth and depth of his knowledge and his generosity towards fellow scholars have made him an important participant in late 20th-century musicology".

From the 1950s onwards Noble engaged in a music criticism career alongside his musicological scholarship. He first began writing for Gramophone and speaking for the BBC Third Programme, with a "melodious and refined voice that was one of his most attractive characteristics". He became a critic for The Times in 1960, alongside William Mann and Andrew Porter for colleagues. He paused music criticism to take two research fellowships, first Birmingham University (1963–1966) and then University at Buffalo (UB; 1966 onwards), during which he was a Fellow of the Harvard Institute for Renaissance Studies (1967–1968). After another criticism post at The Sunday Telegraph (1972–1976), Noble returned to UB in 1976 until his retirement in 1995 and returned to London. He died on 30 June 2017.

Noble was gay and kept a private personal life, having no long-term partner. The Telegraph described him as "loyal and kind, a stout believer in Enlightenment values and Western civilisation in general. He was convinced that anyone could share in those values, given a little patience and goodwill."

== Selected writings ==
=== Articles ===
- Noble, Jeremy (Autumn 1959). "Britten's Songs from the Chinese". Tempo (52): 25–29. doi:10.1017/S0040298200045198. JSTOR 943637. S2CID 144772350.
- —— (August 1963). "Clash and Consonance in the 16th Century". The Musical Times. 104 (1446): 555–557. doi:10.2307/950018. JSTOR 950018.
- —— (June 1971). "Igor Stravinsky, 1882-1971". The Musical Times. 112 (1540): 534–536. JSTOR 957426.
- —— (August 1971). "A New Motet by Josquin?". The Musical Times. 112 (1542): 749–753. doi:10.2307/954595. JSTOR 954595.
- White, Eric Walter; —— (1980). "Stravinsky, Igor". In Sadie, Stanley (ed.). The New Grove Dictionary of Music and Musicians. Vol. 18. Macmillan Publishers. pp. 240–265. ISBN 978-0-333-23111-1.
- Macey, Patrick; ——; Dean, Jeffrey; Reese, Gustave (2011) [2001]. "Josquin (Lebloitte dit) des Prez". Grove Music Online. Oxford: Oxford University Press. doi:10.1093/gmo/9781561592630.article.14497. ISBN 978-1-56159-263-0. Archived from the original on 11 March 2021. (subscription, Wikilibrary access, or UK public library membership required)
- —— (1 January 2023). "William Byrd | Biography, Compositions, Works, Music & Facts". Encyclopædia Britannica. Chicago: Encyclopædia Britannica, Inc.

=== Others ===
- Deutsch, Otto Erich (1965). Mozart: A Documentary Biography. Translated by Blom, Eric; Branscombe, Peter; Noble, Jeremy. Stanford: Stanford University Press. OCLC 8991008.
- Noble, Jeremy (1982). "Applications of the History of Ideas". In Holoman, D. Kern; Palisca, Claude V. (eds.). Musicology in the 1980s: Methods, Goals, Opportunities. New York: Da Capo Press. ISBN 978-0-306-76188-1.
- Noble, Jeremy (1984) [1980]. "Josquin Desprez (III–VI, work-list)". The New Grove High Renaissance Masters: Josquin, Palestrina, Lassus, Byrd, Victoria. The New Grove Dictionary of Music and Musicians: The Composer Biography Series. Other chapters by Gustave Reese, Lewis Lockwood, Jessie Ann Owens, James Haar, Joseph Kerman and Robert Stevenson. London: Macmillan. ISBN 978-0-393-30093-2.
