= American Musicological Society =

American music research organization

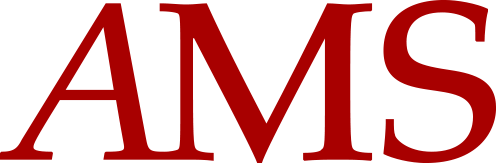
- Formation: June 3, 1934; 92 years ago
- Founders: Various See list: George S. Dickinson; Carl Engel; Gustave Reese; Helen Heffron Roberts; Joseph Schillinger; Charles Seeger; Harold Spivacke; Oliver Strunk; Joseph Yasser
- Type: Nonprofit organization
- Purpose: "exists to expand understanding of music and sound through research, teaching, learning, and advocacy."
- Headquarters: New York, NY, US
- Key people: Steve Swayne (President); Siovahn Walker (Executive Director)
- Website: www.amsmusicology.org

The American Musicological Society (AMS) is a musicological organization which researches, promotes and produces publications on music. Founded in 1934, the AMS was begun by leading American musicologists of the time, and was crucial in legitimizing musicology as a scholarly discipline.

At present, approximately 3000 individual members from forty nations are a part of the Society. Since 1948, the AMS has published the triannual Journal of the American Musicological Society.

== History ==
The American Musicological Society grew out of a small contingent of the Music Teachers National Association and, more directly, the New York Musicological Society (1930–1934). It was officially founded on 3 June 1934 by the leading American musicologists of the time, George S. Dickinson, Carl Engel, Gustave Reese, Helen Heffron Roberts, Joseph Schillinger, Charles Seeger, Harold Spivacke, Oliver Strunk, and Joseph Yasser. Its first president was Otto Kinkeldey, the first American to receive an appointment as professor of musicology (Cornell University, 1930).

== Overview ==
The society consists of approximately 3000 individual members divided among fifteen regional chapters across the United States, Canada, and elsewhere, as well as 60 committees and subcommittees. It was admitted to the American Council of Learned Societies in 1951, and participates in the Répertoire International des Sources Musicales and the Répertoire International de Littérature Musicale. The society's annual meetings consist of paper presentations, panels, and lecture-concerts, as well as more-or-less informal meetings of numerous related musical societies. Many of the society's awards, prizes and fellowships are announced at these meetings.

The AMS awards three fellowships to graduate students in musicology, with a deadline for applications typically in early January. They include the Alvin H. Johnson AMS 50 Dissertation-year Fellowships, Howard Mayer Brown Fellowship, and the Holmes/D'Accone Dissertation Fellowship in Opera Studies.

== Publications ==
Most of the society's resources are dedicated to musicological publications: the triannual Journal of the American Musicological Society (1948–present) published by the University of California Press. The journal publishes scholarship related to historical musicology, critical theory, music analysis, ethnomusicology, gender and sexuality, popular music, aesthetics and more. JAMS was preceded by the annual Bulletin (1936–1947) and the annual Papers (1936–1941). With Oxford University Press, the society sponsors the series AMS Studies in Music.

Other items published by the society include the series Music of the United States of America (1993–present), and the blog Musicology Now. MUSA is a forty-volume scholarly series that addresses American musical styles, including jazz, psalmody, popular song, art song, and experimental music. Musicology Now publishes essays written for the general public. It seeks to engage educators, musicians, listeners, and colleagues with fresh research and ideas about music. The Journal of Music History Pedagogy (JMHP) covers any aspect of the teaching and learning of music history at both the undergraduate and graduate level, for all audiences (majors, non-majors, and the public), and all genres of music.

Additionally, the AMS underwrites expenses involved in the publication of works of musical scholarship, providing between $75,000 and $100,000 of publication subventions each year.

== List of presidents ==
- Otto Kinkeldey (1935–36)
- Carl Engel (1937–38)
- Carleton Sprague Smith (1939–40)
- Otto Kinkeldey (1941–42)
- Glen Haydon (1943–44)
- Charles Seeger (1945–46)
- George S. Dickinson (1947–48)
- Curt Sachs (1949–50)
- Gustave Reese (1951–52)
- Donald Jay Grout (1953–54)
- Karl Geiringer (1955–56)
- J. Murray Barbour (1957–58)
- Oliver Strunk (1959–60)
- Donald Jay Grout (1961–62)
- Nathan Broder (1963–64)
- William Mitchell (1965–66)
- Jan LaRue (1967–68)
- William S. Newman (1969–70)
- Claude V. Palisca (1971–72)
- Charles Hamm (1973–74)
- Janet Knapp (1975–76)
- James Haar (1977–78)
- Howard Mayer Brown (1979–80)
- Howard E. Smither (1981–82)
- Richard Crawford (1983–84)
- Margaret Bent (1985–86)
- Lewis Lockwood (1987–88)
- H. Colin Slim (1989–90)
- H. Wiley Hitchcock (1991–92)
- Ellen Rosand (1993–94)
- Philip Gossett (1995–96)
- James Webster (1997–98)
- Ruth A. Solie (1999–2000)
- Jessie Ann Owens (2001–02)
- Wye J. Allanbrook (2003)
- J. Peter Burkholder (2003–04)
- Elaine Sisman (2005–06)
- Charles M. Atkinson (2007–08)
- Jane Bernstein (2009–10)
- Anne Walters Robertson (2011–12)
- Christopher A. Reynolds (2013–14)
- Ellen T. Harris (2015–16)
- Martha Feldman (2017–18)
- Suzanne G. Cusick (2019–20)
- Steve Swayne (2021–2022)
