= Venetian music =

Venetian music may refer to:

- Music of Venice
- Music of Veneto
