= Taigu =

Taigu may refer to:

- Former name of Mingxing, Shanxi, China
- Taigu County, in Shanxi, China
- Ryōkan Taigu (1758–1831), Japanese Zen Buddhist monk
