= Janet Knapp =

American musicologist (1922–2010)

President of the American Musicological Society
- In office 1975–1976

Personal details
- Born: September 1, 1922 Cobleskill, New York, U.S.
- Died: January 22, 2010 (aged 87) Oberlin, Ohio, U.S.
- Spouse: G. Huntington Byles (m. 1965; died 1998)
- Occupation: Musicologist
- Awards: Guggenheim Fellowship (1966)

Academic background
- Education: Oberlin College; Yale University
- Thesis: The Polyphonic Conductus In The Notre-dame Epoch: A Study Of The Sixth And Seventh Fascicles Of The Manuscript Florence, Biblioteca Laurenziana, Pluteus 29.I (1961)

Janet Elizabeth Knapp (September 1, 1922 – January 22, 2010) was an American musicologist. She worked as professor at Yale University, Boston University, and Vassar College, and she was the first woman president of the American Musicological Society, serving from 1975 to 1976. She was editor for Thirty-Five Conductus for Two and Three Voices (1965) and was a 1966 Guggenheim Fellow.

== Biography ==
=== Early life and education ===
Knapp was born on September 1, 1922 in Cobleskill, New York. Her father, Halsey B. Knapp, was director of the Long Island Agricultural and Technical Institute. She worked as a public school music supervisor in Farmingdale.

Following her graduation from Oberlin College, (Note: Sources vary on the date of her graduation from Oberlin. While Reports of the President and the Treasurer and the Oberlin College Archives give different years for her Bachelor of Arts degree - 1945 and 1946, respectively - a contemporary article by The Farmingdale Post says that she graduated in 1944.) she was granted an Oberlin Shansi Memorial Association fellowship to teach in China; her fellowship had been suspended for a few years due to World War II. She taught English and music at the Ming Hsien school from 1946 until 1949, shortly before it was taken over by Communist forces and became Shanxi Agricultural University.

Returning to the United States, she obtained her MA from Oberlin in 1952, and she moved to Yale University, where she obtained her PhD in musicology in 1961. Her doctoral dissertation was titled The Polyphonic Conductus In The Notre-dame Epoch: A Study Of The Sixth And Seventh Fascicles Of The Manuscript Florence, Biblioteca Laurenziana, Pluteus 29.I.

=== Academic career ===
After becoming an instructor in 1958 and being promoted to assistant professor in 1962, she moved from Yale to Boston University in 1963 as associate professor of music. In 1964, she became BU's chair of the Department of Music History. In 1971, she became full professor of music at Vassar College, teaching since then until 1988; she later became a professor emerita.

She specialized in the Medieval Latin conductus genre. Her book Thirty-Five Conductus for Two and Three Voices was published in 1965. She was a 1965 Martha Baird Rockefeller Fund for Music fellow. In 1966, she was awarded a Guggenheim Fellowship "for a study of Latin poetry in the musical liturgies of the 11th and 12th centuries". From 1975 to 1976, she was president of the American Musicological Society, the first woman to hold that position.

=== Personal life and death ===
On September 7, 1965, she married G. Huntington Byles, who was organist-choirmaster of Trinity Church on the Green, in St. Peter's Episcopal Church in Morristown, New Jersey. They remained married until his death in 1998.

Originally living in Fearrington Village, North Carolina, she moved alongside her husband to Kendal at Oberlin, a retirement community in Oberlin, Ohio, in 1993. Knapp died there on January 22, 2010.

== Bibliography ==
- (as editor) Thirty-Five Conductus for Two and Three Voices (1965)
