= Oberlin Band (China) =

Late 19th century group of American Christian missionaries in China

The Oberlin Band was a group of Christian missionaries in China from Oberlin College in Ohio. Members of the Oberlin Band worked in Shanxi province from 1882 until 1900. During the Boxer Rebellion in 1900, the 15 missionary men, women, and children of the Oberlin Band were among the foreign missionaries executed by order of the provincial government or killed by Boxers and soldiers.

The missionaries of the Oberlin Band were associated with the American Board of Commissioners for Foreign Missions (ABCFM), also called the American Board.

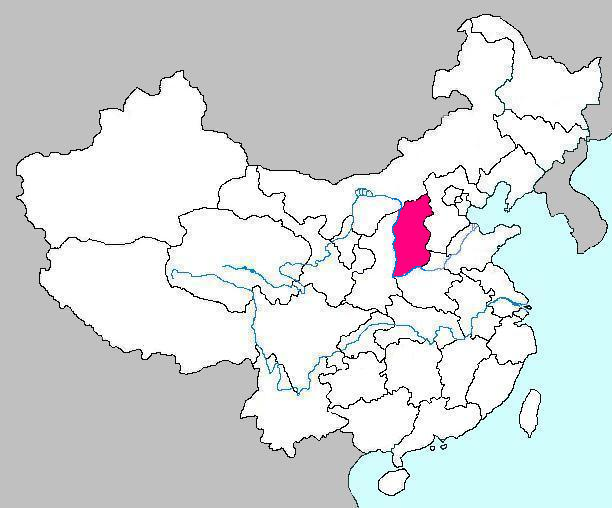
The location of Shanxi (or Shansi) province, China.

== Background ==
In the 19th century Oberlin College in Oberlin, Ohio, was prominent for its reformist social agenda and Christian fervor. Oberlin was the first American college to regularly admit African-American students. Its abolitionist activism led one historian to call Oberlin the "town that started the Civil War."

After the Civil War, Oberlin turned much of its attention to the spread of the Christian gospel of salvation around the world. "Let us arise …" said one theologian, "to grapple … with the stupendous work of supplanting the … empire of Satan". Christianity and civilization were believed to be synonymous by many in the Christian world. "We contend that a true Civilization cannot exist apart from Christianity," said a missionary journal. Thus, a missionary could foster the blessings of both Christianity and civilization in the non-Christian countries, the largest of which was China, ruled by the Qing dynasty. "Three hundred to four hundred millions of souls are here crowded together [and] nine-tenths of these multitudes are still unreached by the gospel." Underlying the enthusiasm for missionary endeavor was the theory that it was essential to convert the world to Christianity to anticipate the coming of the millennium, the thousand-year reign of Christ foretold in the Bible.

The idealism and social and religion activism of Oberlin made it a major contributor to the missionary enterprise around the world. Oberlin graduates such as William Scott Ament had joined the ABCFM and were living and working in China in the 1870s as part of the effort to bring the gospel of Christianity to all peoples.

Protestant missionaries were not resident in Shanxi province in inland northern China until the Northern Chinese Famine of 1876-1879. During the famine, caused by a drought, missionaries distributed food in the province to an estimated 3.4 million persons. Even so, according to some estimates five million people, one third of the population in Shanxi, died in the famine. Roman Catholics had long been resident in Shanxi and a few Chinese had become Catholic, but Protestants and Catholics customarily did not interact even though their respective missions and churches might be in close proximity to each other.

== The Oberlin Band in Shanxi ==
On January 5, 1881, a student at the Oberlin Theological Seminary, Martin Luther Stimson, wrote the American Board and offered the services of 12 graduates of Oberlin as missionaries to China. The American Board accepted the offer and suggested Shanxi, where only a few missionaries of the British China Inland Mission and Baptist Missionary Society were working, as a mission field. Stimson and his wife Emily Brooks (Hall) Stimson became the first of the Oberlin Band to arrive in Shanxi in 1882. They were soon joined by others. A total of 30 missionaries, including male missionaries, their wives, and single female missionaries worked in Shanxi with the Oberlin Band between 1882 and 1900. However, the number on station was always much smaller as turnover was high. Most of the missionaries resigned and departed Shanxi and China after only a few years. The Oberlin Band established missionary stations in the cities of Taigu and Fenzhou, respectively 36 (60 km) and 60 (100 km) miles south and southwest of the capital city of Taiyuan.

From the beginning the Oberlin Band encountered serious problems. None of the missionaries received any training, orientation, or studied Chinese before departing for China, although the American Board gave each family 500 dollars to buy and transport food and other necessities to their station in China. The Chinese language proved immensely difficult for most missionaries to learn. Living conditions in Taigu and Fenzhou were crowded and unsanitary. Disease was rampant. Ten of the thirty adult missionaries died in Shanxi, and many others suffered serious illnesses. Twelve of 25 children born to Oberlin missionaries in Shanxi died.

Doctrinal disputes quickly broke out among the missionaries. Charles D. Tenney moved away from conventional Christian beliefs to Unitarianism and favored attempting to evangelize only among the elite. Stimson, on the other hand, favored hiring Chinese preachers and assistants and spreading Christianity from the bottom up. The Oberlin Band sided with Tenney, but eventually adopted the methods of Stimson. Both Tenney and Stimson soon resigned. The missionaries understood little of Chinese culture—and deplored most of what they understood. At Taigu, in 1899, after nearly two decades of work, the missionaries had converted only 76 Chinese. They had also opened a boy's boarding school with 24 pupils, a girl's boarding school with 16 pupils, and had treated 1,313 patients that year at the missionary hospital and dispensary. The missionaries had also housed and treated more than 150 opium addicts during the year.

== The Boxers ==
The Oberlin Band's Annual Report for 1899 mentions rumors among the Chinese that the Christian missionaries were poisoning wells. This was perhaps the first harbinger in Shanxi of the Boxers—an anti-Christian, anti-foreign peasant movement that began in Shandong province in 1898 and spread north and west. The Boxers were a millenarian movement which believed that by observing the proper rituals they could become invulnerable to Christian bullets and kill or expel the hated foreigners from China. A drought exacerbated the growing unrest in the countryside. In March 1900, a pro-Boxer official named Yuxian was appointed governor of Shanxi.

In June 1900, Boxer emissaries arrived in Taigu and Fenzhou and the missionaries began to experience threats and taunts as they moved around the city and the countryside. Menacing mobs gathered outside missionary stations. News came of Boxer attacks on railroads and foreigners near Beijing and of Chinese government support for the Boxers. The missionaries heard the rumor that June 27 was the date set by the Boxers for the extermination of the missionaries in Shanxi. That day passed without incident for the Oberlin Band in Taigu and Fenzhou but two young Englishwomen, missionaries of the China Inland Mission, were killed in an outlying village.

On July 9, 45 foreign missionaries, Protestant and Catholic, and Chinese Christian leaders were executed by beheading in the government courtyard in Taiyuan. (See Taiyuan Massacre). Most of them were English members of the Baptist Missionary Society. Two of those killed were Ernestine and Mary Atwater, 10 and eight years old, daughters of Oberlin Band members Ernest and Elizabeth Atwater, resident in Fenzhou.

== Taigu massacre ==
In July 1900, the Oberlin Band missionaries in Taigu were virtually under siege in the missionary compound. There were six Americans: Rev. Dwight Howard Clapp and his wife Mary Jane; Rev. George Louis Williams and Rev. Francis Ward Davis, both of whose wives were in the United States; and two single female missionaries, Susan Rowena Bird and Mary Louise Partridge. With them were some 50 Chinese Christians, including 22 men. On July 31, a mob of Boxers broke into the compound. The missionaries and a few Chinese hid in an empty shed where they were discovered by a Boxer. Clapp, a pacifist, opposed any resistance, but Davis, armed with a pistol, shot and wounded a Boxer. The Boxers then killed all the Christians, reportedly by burning the shed and stoning the Christians when they attempted to escape.

The Boxers then roamed the city and the countryside near Taigu killing 70 to 100 Chinese Christians and members of their families.

== Fenzhou massacre ==
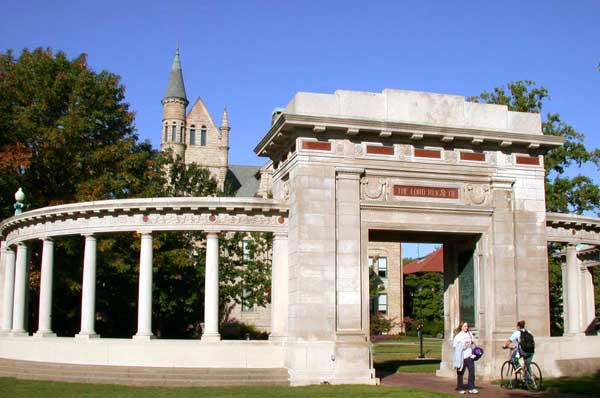
The Memorial Arch at Oberlin College is dedicated to the memory of the 15 missionaries of the Oberlin Band killed in China in 1900.

Seven members of the Oberlin Band were in Fenzhou: Charles and Eva Price and their daughter, Florence, about six years old; and Ernest and Elizabeth Atwater and their two younger daughters, Celia and Bertha, about five and three years old. With them were three missionaries of the China Inland Mission.

On August 14, the missionaries were ordered to leave the city. The ten missionaries, three Chinese Christians, and two cart drivers departed through the streets while 10,000 people silently watched them depart. The soldiers escorting the missionaries had orders to kill them along the road, One of the Chinese Christians, warned of what was coming, bribed the soldiers with his possessions and was permitted to depart. As he was fleeing he heard shots. All the missionaries were killed. The soldiers robbed the bodies and local villagers buried them.

== Aftermath ==
A multinational army, the Eight-Nation Alliance, rescued foreigners besieged by the Boxers and Chinese Army in Tianjin and Beijing. (See Battle of Tientsin and Siege of the International Legations), but not until January 1901 did German soldiers reach Shanxi and learn the fate of the Oberlin Band and other missionaries in the province. A memorial service was held for the slain in Taiyuan on July 9, one year after the Taiyuan massacre. In 1903, a memorial arch to the Oberlin Band was erected on the campus of Oberlin College. The Oberlin Shansi Memorial Association was founded in 1908 and Oberlin graduate Kung Hsiang-hsi opened the Ming Hsien school in Taigu on land given to the ABCFM in restitution for the killing of the missionaries. The school, with help from Oberlin college, continued to function until 1945, when the school was forced to relocate to southwest China, a small town in Sichuan after the Sino-Japanese War. After Communist China won the civil war in 1949, Ming-Hsiah became Shanxi Agricultural University.

In 1951, Oberlin College and Shanxi Agriculture University lost contact with each other following the outbreak of the Korean War. Then, in 1982, the two schools resumed contact after "Reform and Opening." Oberlin began to send Shansi Reps every year to Shanxi Agricultural University teaching English under the auspices of the Oberlin Shansi Memorial Association, a practice which has continued to this very day.
