= Donald Jay Grout =

American musicologist (1902-1987)

Donald Jay Grout (September 28, 1902 – March 9, 1987) was an American musicologist. He is best known as the author of A Short History of Opera, first published in 1947. The fourth edition was published by Columbia University Press in 2003.

== Early life and education ==
Grout was born in Rock Rapids, Iowa. He attended Syracuse University and graduated with a degree in philosophy in 1923. He took his Ph.D. at Harvard University in 1939. He taught at Harvard from 1936 to 1942, at the University of Texas from 1942 to 1945 and at Cornell University until 1970.

== Career ==
Early in his career, Grout's main body of research was in opera. After 1960 he became more interested in philosophies of music history, due in large part to his publication of a general music history textbook, A History of Western Music. A ninth edition of the book was published in 2014; after Grout's death, the new editions were revised by Claude Palisca and J. Peter Burkholder.

Grout also performed as a pianist and organist until the early 1950s. He served as editor of JAMS from 1948 to 1951, and was president of the American Musicological Society (1952–1954, 1960–1962) and the International Musicological Society (1961–1964).

A reassessment of Grout's historiography was published in 2011 in the inaugural volume of Journal of Music History Pedagogy.

== Bibliography ==
- The Origins of the "opéra comique" (diss., Harvard U., 1939)
- A Short History of Opera (New York, 1947, revised 3rd edition 1988 by H.W. Williams; 4th edition by Hermine Weigel Williams, published by Columbia University Press, 2003 )
- A History of Western Music (New York, 1960, 7th ed, 2005 with J. Peter Burkholder)
- Mozart in the History of Opera (Washington DC, 1972)
- Principles and Practice in the Writing of Music History (Brussels: Paleis der Academiën, 1972)
- Alessandro Scarlatti: An Introduction to his Operas (Berkeley, 1979)
