= Leo Treitler =

American musicologist

Leo Treitler (born January 26, 1931) is an American musicologist born in Dortmund, Germany. He is distinguished professor at the Graduate Center of the City University of New York.

Treitler studied at the University of Chicago, earning a B.A. (1950) and M.A. (1957). He earned his MFA from Princeton University (1960) and a Ph.D. (1967); there he studied under Oliver Strunk, Arthur Mendel, and Roger Sessions. From 1961 to 1965 he taught at the University of Chicago, and following this at Brandeis University and Stony Brook University.

Treitler's major work is in Medieval and Renaissance music, particularly in Gregorian chant and the earliest polyphony. He also published a series of essays exploring historiography in music history, which were collected, with other works on music history and theory, in Music and the Historical Imagination. He revised Oliver Strunk's Source Readings in Music History in 1998.

He married artist Mary Frank in 1995.

== Books ==
- The Aquitanian Repertories of Sacred Monody in the Eleventh and Twelfth Centuries (dissertation, Princeton University, 1967)
- Music and the Historical Imagination. (Cambridge, Massachusetts, 1989) [collection of essays]
- Source Readings in Music History. New York, 1998 (orig. ed. O. Strunk, pub. 1950)
- With Voice and Pen: Coming to Know Medieval Song and How it Was Made. (Oxford, 2003)

== Major articles ==
=== On the rise of Western plainchant and notation ===
- "Homer and Gregory: The Transmission of Epic Poetry and Plainchant." The Musical Quarterly, vol. 60, no. 3 (July 1974), pp. 333–372
- " 'Centonate' Chant: 'Übles Flickwerk' or 'E pluribus unus?'". Journal of the American Musicological Society, vol. 28, no. 1 (Spring 1975), pp. 1–23
- "The Early History of Music Writing in the West." Journal of the American Musicological Society, vol. 35, no. 2 (Summer 1982), pp. 237–279
- "Reading and Singing: On the Genesis of Occidental Music-Writing." Early Music History, vol. 4 (1984), pp. 135–208
- "The 'Unwritten' and 'Written Transmission' of Medieval Chant and the Start-Up of Musical Notation." The Journal of Musicology, vol. 10, no. 2 (Spring 1992), pp. 131–191

=== On historiography and musical analysis ===
- "The Present as History." Perspectives of New Music, vol. 7, no. 2 (Spring 1969), pp. 1–58
- "History, Criticism, and Beethoven's Ninth Symphony." 19th-Century Music, vol. 3, no. 3 (March 1980), pp. 193–210
- " 'To Worship That Celestial Sound': Motives for Analysis." The Journal of Musicology, vol. 1, no. 2 (April 1982), pp. 153–170
