= Lewis Lockwood =

American musicologist (born 1930)

Lewis Henry Lockwood (born December 16, 1930) is an American musicologist whose main fields are the music of the Italian Renaissance and the life and work of Ludwig van Beethoven. Joseph Kerman described him as "a leading musical scholar of the postwar generation, and the leading American authority on Beethoven".

== Early life and education ==
Born in New York City in December 1930, Lockwood attended the High School of Music and Art. He then did his undergraduate work at Queens College, where his main advisor was the well-known Renaissance scholar, Edward Lowinsky. He went on to do graduate work at Princeton University in the early 1950s with Oliver Strunk, Arthur Mendel, and Nino Pirrotta. After a Fulbright scholarship to Italy in 1955–56, he took the Ph.D. in musicology at Princeton with a dissertation on the 16th-century Italian composer, Vincenzo Ruffo, whose sacred music shows the direct influence of the aesthetic of the Counter-Reformation. Lockwood was trained as a cellist, studying first with Albin Antosch and later with Lucien Laporte of the Paganini Quartet. He is still active in chamber music.

== Work ==
After serving in the U.S. Army in 1956–58, where he played as cellist in the Seventh Army Symphony Orchestra, Lockwood taught at Princeton University from 1958 to 1980, and at Harvard University from 1980 to 2002. After his retirement from Harvard in 2002, he was given an honorary appointment at Boston University and is presently co-director of the Boston University Center for Beethoven Research. He edited the Journal of the American Musicological Society from 1964 to 1967 and was president of the American Musicological Society from 1987 to 1988.

Lockwood's work in Italian music history focused first on issues of style and genre, including redefinition of the familiar term "Parody mass" and related subjects. In later years he turned to the study of a single major musical center of the Renaissance, fifteenth-century Ferrara, and carried out extensive archival research which resulted in his major book, Music in Renaissance Ferrara, 1400-1505(1984). This is a comprehensive study of the music, musicians, and patronage by which the Este dynasty built their court into an important center.

In his later work, on Beethoven, Lockwood is known for manuscript research, especially on Beethoven's sketchbooks and autographs, but also wider frameworks of study His earliest Beethoven research was on the composing score of the Cello Sonata Op. 69, first movement, a rare and remarkable example of Beethoven's radical transformation of a movement at a late stage of composition. There followed other similar studies focused on sources. His biography, entitled Beethoven: The Music and the Life (Norton, 2003), was a finalist for a Pulitzer Prize in biography. Thereafter he published a book on the string quartets with the Juilliard String Quartet members as co-authors, entitled Inside Beethoven's Quartets (2008). In 2013, in collaboration with Alan Gosman, he completed seven years of work on the first critical edition of one of the largest and most revealing of the many surviving Beethoven sketchbooks. The publication, Beethoven's "Eroica" Sketchbook, was issued by the University of Illinois Press in that year. Then followed his book, Beethoven's Symphonies: An Artistic Vision (Norton, 2015) and a critical survey of the broad field of Beethoven biography, from the 1830s to the present, entitled Beethoven's Lives (2020). Most recently his essay on the Beethoven manuscripts in the library of the Juilliard School in New York appeared in a volume describing all the music manuscripts at Juilliard, edited by Jane Gottlieb (2023). The collection includes Beethoven's annotated copy of the Ninth Symphony and both sketches and the full-score autograph manuscript of the Scherzo of the String Quartet in Eb Major, Op. 127. He has also published articles in The New York Review of Books.

== Awards and distinctions ==
In 1984, Lockwood was elected to membership in the American Academy of Arts and Sciences, and in 2013 to the American Philosophical Society. A festschrift in his honor was published in 1996. The Lewis Lockwood Award of the American Musicological Society, awarded annually to an exceptional book by a musicologist within ten years of his or her Ph.D., is named in his honor. In 2018 he was elected an Honorary Member of the Beethoven-Haus Verein in Bonn. In the same year he was, with Margaret Bent, the co-winner of the Guido Adler Prize for his contributions to the field of musicology.

== Selected publications ==
- Beethoven's Lives: The Biographical Tradition (Woodbridge:The Boydell Press, 2020)
- Beethoven's Symphonies: An Artistic Vision (New York: W.W. Norton, 2015)
- Beethoven's "Eroica" Sketchbook: A Critical Edition: Transcription, Facsimile, Commentary; co-authored with Alan Gosman, 2 vols. (University of Illinois Press, 2013)
- Inside Beethoven's Quartets: History, Performance, Interpretation, co-authored with the Juilliard String Quartet (Cambridge, MA: Harvard University Press, 2008)
- Beethoven: The Music and the Life (New York: W.W. Norton, 2003; paperback 2005); finalist for a Pulitzer Prize in biography; translated into eight languages
- Beethoven: Studies in the Creative Process (Harvard University Press, 1992)
- Music in Renaissance Ferrara, 1400-1505 (Oxford University Press, 1984; revised reprint Oxford University Press, 2008)
- The Counter-Reformation and the Masses of Vincenzo Ruffo (Venice: Fondazione Giorgio Cini, 1970)

In addition, Lockwood is the author of many articles and other publications in both Renaissance and Beethoven studies, and was the founder of the yearbook Beethoven Forum. A list of his articles and books is included in The New Beethoven (Woodbridge: The Boydell Press), ed. by Jeremy Yudkin (2020), xv-xix. A recent article on the Beethoven manuscripts in the Juilliard School Library in New York City, appeared in "Juilliard School Library: Music Manuscripts & Other Treasures by and for Performers", ed. by Jane Gottlieb and Richard Griscom (Scala Publishers, New York, 2024),51-69.

== Personal life ==
Lockwood was married to Doris Hoffmann Lockwood from 1953 until her untimely death in 1992, and they had two children, Daniel Lockwood and Alison Lockwood Cronson. His two grandchildren are Rachel Cronson and Jeremy Cronson. In 1997, he married Ava Bry Penman.
