= J. Peter Burkholder =

American musicologist and author

- Born: June 17, 1954 (age 72)
- Education: PhD, University of Chicago, 1983 MA, University of Chicago, 1980 AB, Earlham College, 1975
- Occupation: Musicologist

J. Peter Burkholder (born June 17, 1954) is an American musicologist and author. He is Distinguished Professor Emeritus of Musicology at the Indiana University Jacobs School of Music. He has written numerous monographs, essays, and journal articles on twentieth-century music, Charles Ives, musical borrowing, American music, musical meaning, analysis, and music history pedagogy. He is the principal author of A History of Western Music, 10th Edition, published by W. W. Norton & Company.

== Career ==
Burkholder grew up in Urbana, Illinois, the son of mathematician Donald L. Burkholder and longtime Urbana School Board member Jean F. Burkholder. He graduated from University High School, Earlham College and The University of Chicago, where he received his Ph.D. in Musicology in 1983. He began his teaching career at the University of Wisconsin before moving to Indiana University Bloomington, where he taught from 1988 to 2019 and served as Associate Dean of the Faculties (1995–2000) and Musicology Department Chair (2009–2013). Burkholder has served as president, vice-president, and director-at-large for the American Musicological Society. He has also served as president of the Charles Ives Society (1992–2010) and board member of the College Music Society.

Burkholder has contributed to four main areas. Several articles argue for a view of modernism in music that stresses not only its innovations but also its engagement with the past. Five books and numerous articles on Charles Ives revised the earlier view of the composer as American iconoclast, showing his knowledge of European traditions and his gradual evolution from shared conventions to radical modernism. Burkholder’s works on musical borrowing in Ives, in Renaissance music, and elsewhere led him to argue that borrowing is a constant current of Western music (both classical and popular) from Gregorian chant to sampling, rather than a special problem in certain repertories as it was previously regarded. He outlined the first broad history of borrowing as a practice and developed an extensive online bibliography on the subject, and his work on borrowing is featured in the graphic novel Theft!: A History of Music. He has also written extensively on music history pedagogy and historical narratives. His publications have been translated into Japanese, Chinese, Korean, Spanish, German, Italian, and Arabic and are known worldwide.

Since 2001, he has written and revised A History of Western Music and the corresponding Norton Anthology of Western Music after the deaths of the previous authors, Donald Jay Grout and Claude V. Palisca. A History of Western Music is an English-language general survey of music history used at colleges and universities around the world. Burkholder thoroughly revised the narrative to emphasize the people who made and heard the music and what they valued in it and to include more music from the Americas, more by women and African Americans, and more popular music and jazz.

== Awards ==
In 1986, Burkholder was awarded the Alfred Einstein Award for excellence of a musicological article by the American Musicological Society. Additional honors include two Irving Lowens Awards from the Society for American Music, and two Deems Taylor Awards from ASCAP. In 2010, he was named an Honorary Member of the American Musicological Society, the youngest person ever granted this award for lifetime achievement. In 2024, he was given a Lifetime Achievement Award by the Society for American Music for his scholarly insights into the music of Ives and his contributions to the pedagogy of music history.

== Selected bibliography ==
- "Museum Pieces: The Historicist Mainstream in Music of the Last Hundred Years," The Journal of Musicology 2/2 (Spring 1983): 115–134
- "Brahms and Twentieth-Century Classical Music," 19th-Century Music 8/1 (Summer 1984): 75–83
- "Johannes Martini and the Imitation Mass of the Late Fifteenth Century," Journal of the American Musicological Society 38/3 (Fall 1985): 470–523 (Alfred Einstein Award winner, 1986)
- Charles Ives: The Ideas Behind the Music (New Haven, CT, 1985) (Irving Lowens Award winner, 1987)
- "The Uses of Existing Music: Musical Borrowing as a Field," Music Library Association Notes 50/3 (March 1994): 851–870
- All Made of Tunes: Charles Ives and the Uses of Musical Borrowing (New Haven, CT 1995)
- Charles Ives and His World (Princeton, NJ: Princeton University Press, 1996, editor)
- Charles Ives and the Classical Tradition (New Haven, CT: Yale University Press, 1996, editor with Geoffrey Block)
- "Borrowing," in The New Grove Dictionary of Music and Musicians/Grove Music Online (2001) (https://doi.org/10.1093/gmo/9781561592630.article.52918)
- "The Organist in Ives," Journal of the American Musicological Society 55/2 (Summer 2002): 255–310 (Irving Lowens Award winner, 2004)
- "Music of the Americas and Historical Narratives," American Music 27 (Winter 2009): 399–423 (ASCAP-Deems Taylor Award winner, 2010)
- A History of Western Music, 10th edition (New York: W. W. Norton, 2019, with Donald Jay Grout and Claude V. Palisca)
- Norton Anthology of Western Music, 8th edition (New York: W. W. Norton, 2019, with Claude V. Palisca)
- Listening to Charles Ives: Variations on His America (Lanham, MD: Amadeus Press, 2021)
