= Shuixiu Township =

Shuixiu Township 水秀乡
- Township
- Location in Shanxi
- Coordinates: 37°27′44″N 112°33′15″E
- Country: People's Republic of China
- Province: Shanxi
- Prefecture-level city: Jinzhong
- District: Taigu District
- Time zone: UTC+8 (China Standard)
- Area code: 0354

Shuixiu Township (simplified Chinese: 水秀乡; traditional Chinese: 水秀鄉; pinyin: Shuǐxiù Xiāng) is a township of Taigu District, Jinzhong in central Shanxi province, China. As of 2020, it has 13 villages under its administration.

- Shuixiu Village
- Beiguo Village (北郭村)
- Donghuaiyuan Village (东怀远村)
- Taipingzhuang Village (太平庄村)
- Bai Village (白村)
- Nanguo Village (南郭村)
- Zhangjiazhuang Village (张家庄村)
- Fengjiapu Village (冯家堡村)
- Xiaowangpu Village (小王堡村)
- Beiliumen Village (北六门村)
- Huojiapu Village (霍家堡村)
- Tuanchang Village (团场村)
- Guojiapu Village (郭家堡村)

== See also ==
- List of township-level divisions of Shanxi
