= Oliver Strunk =

American musicologist (1901–1980)

William Oliver Strunk (March 22, 1901 – February 24, 1980) was an American musicologist. Charles Rosen called him one of the most influential American musicologists of the 1930s to the 1960s. He was known for his anthology Source Readings in Music History (1950) and his work on Byzantine music.

== Life and career ==
Strunk was the son of Elements of Style author William Strunk, Jr. (1869–1946). He attended Cornell University from 1917 to 1919 and again in 1927, studying under Otto Kinkeldey. While never earning a university degree, he received honorary degrees from the University of Rochester in 1936 and from the University of Chicago in 1970. He studied at Berlin University from 1927 to 1928 and then worked at the Library of Congress, becoming head of the Music Division in 1934. He began his teaching career as a lecturer at the Catholic University of America in 1934, and in 1937 joined the faculty of Princeton University, becoming a full professor in 1950. Retiring from teaching in 1966 he moved to Grottaferrata, Italy, continuing his research on Byzantine music at the Abbey of Santa Maria (Badia Greca) there.

Strunk served as president of the Music Library Association (1935 to 1937) and was a founding member of the American Musicological Society, as well as the initial editor of the Journal of the American Musicological Society in 1948 and the president of the AMS from 1959 to 1960. He directed the Monumenta Musicae Byzantinae from 1961 to 1971. His scholarship was exceptionally broad, covering the notation of early Byzantine music, the ars nova, Renaissance motets, Haydn, and Verdi. He was one of the leading figures in post–World War II American musicology. His Source Readings in Music History (1950; rev. 1998 by Leo Treitler) was and is a standard primary-source text for music historians.

== Selected publications ==
- State and Resources of Musicology in the United States (Washington DC, 1932)
- Source Readings in Music History (New York, 1950, enlarged 2nd ed. 1998 by Leo Treitler)
- (ed.) Specimina notationum antiquiorum (1966)
- Essays on music in the Western World (New York, 1974)
- (with Enrica Follieri) Triodium Athoum (1975)
- Essays on music in the Byzantine World (New York, 1977)
