= Christopher A. Reynolds =

- Born: Christopher Alan Reynolds
- Known for: Renaissance music scholarship; musical allusion; Beethoven studies; women song composers research
- Awards: Fellow of the American Academy of Arts and Sciences (2016); Member of Academia Europaea (2022)

Academic background
- Education: University of California, Riverside (BA); Princeton University (MFA, PhD)

Christopher Alan Reynolds is an American musicologist and academic. He is a distinguished professor emeritus at the University of California, Davis. Reynolds is known for his research on Renaissance music, 19th and 20th-century music—particularly the works of Beethoven, Brahms, and Wagner—and the history of women composers in the late 19th and early 20th centuries. He served as president of the American Musicological Society (AMS) during the years 2013 and 2014.

== Education ==
Reynolds earned his Bachelor of Arts in music from the University of California, Riverside in 1973. He went on to earn an MFA in 1975 and a PhD in 1982 in musicology from Princeton University.

== Career ==
Reynolds began his teaching career as a lecturer at the University of Illinois at Urbana-Champaign (1979–1981), where he also conducted the Madrigal Choir. He subsequently served as an assistant professor and choral director at McGill University in Montreal (1981–1985). In 1985, he joined the faculty of the University of California, Davis, achieving the rank of professor in 1993 and distinguished professor in 2017. He retired as Distinguished Professor Emeritus in 2018 and held the title of Edward A. Dickson Emeritus Professor for the 2024–25 academic year.

== Awards and honors ==
- 2008 – H. Colin Slim Award, American Musicological Society
- 2009 – Kurt Weill Prize, Kurt Weill Foundation (for "Porgy and Bess: An American Wozzeck")
- 2013 – UC Davis Prize for Undergraduate Teaching and Scholarly Achievement
- 2014 – Richard S. Hill Award, Music Library Association (for his article on the Women Song Composers database)
- 2016 – Fellow of the American Academy of Arts and Sciences
- 2017 – Honorary Member, American Musicological Society
- 2022 – Member of the Academia Europaea
- 2023 – Honorary member, American Beethoven Society

== Major publications ==
=== Monographs ===
- Papal Patronage and the Music of St. Peter’s, 1380–1513 (1995). Berkeley: University of California Press.
- Motives for Allusion: Context and Content in Nineteenth-Century Music (2003). Cambridge, Massachusetts: Harvard University Press. ISBN 9780674010376.
- Wagner, Schumann and the Lessons of Beethoven’s Ninth (2015). Berkeley: University of California Press. ISBN 9780520285569.

=== Selected articles ===
==== Renaissance music ====
- “Musical Careers, Ecclesiastical Benefices, and the Example of Johannes Brunet” (1984). Journal of the American Musicological Society 37: 49–97. doi:10.2307/831159.
- “Musical Evidence of Compositional Planning in the Renaissance: Josquin’s Plus nulz regretz” (1987). Journal of the American Musicological Society 40: 53–81. doi:10.2307/831582.
- “The Counterpoint of Allusion in Fifteenth-Century Masses” (1992). Journal of the American Musicological Society 45: 228–260. doi:10.2307/831448.
- “Interpreting and Dating Josquin’s Missa Hercules Dux Ferrariae” (2004). In Honey Meconi (ed.), Early Musical Borrowing. New York and London: Routledge, pp. 91–110.
- “Motive, Structure and Meaning in Willaert’s Motet Videns Dominus” (2015). Journal of Musicology 32 (3): 328–345. doi:10.1525/jm.2015.32.3.328.
- “Alessandro Striggio’s Analysis of Cipriano de Rore’s Ancor che col partire” (2017). Journal of the Alamire Foundation 9 (2): 197–218. doi:10.1484/J.JAF.5.115542.

==== 19th and 20th Centuries ====
- “A Choral Symphony by Brahms?” (1985). 19th-Century Music 9: 3–25. doi:10.2307/746238.
- “From Berlioz’s Fugitive to Godard’s Terrorist: Artistic Responses to Beethoven’s Late Quartets” (2000). Beethoven Forum 8: 147–163.
- “Porgy and Bess: An ‘American Wozzeck’” (2007). Journal of the Society for American Music 1: 1–28. doi:10.1017/S1752196307070010.
- “Thoughts on the Art and Craft of Writing Music for Film: A Conversation with James Newton Howard” (2010). The Hopkins Review 3: 320–351.
- “Brahms Rhapsodizing: The Alto Rhapsody and Its Expressive Double” (2012). Journal of Musicology 29: 190–237. doi:10.1525/jm.2012.29.2.191.
- “Überlegungen zur Bedeutung von ‘Reworkings’ in der Komposition von Rockliedern” (2017). In Albrecht Riethmüller and Frédéric Döhl (eds.), Musik aus zweiter Hand / Second Hand Music. Laaber: Laaber-Verlag, pp. 47–76. ISBN 9783890078892.
- “Schumann contra Wagner: Beethoven, the F-A-E Sonata, and ‘Artwork of the Future’” (2021). Nineteenth-Century Music Review 17 (3): 1–27. doi:10.1017/S1479409820000257.
