= Taigu District =

Taigu 太谷区 Taiku
- District
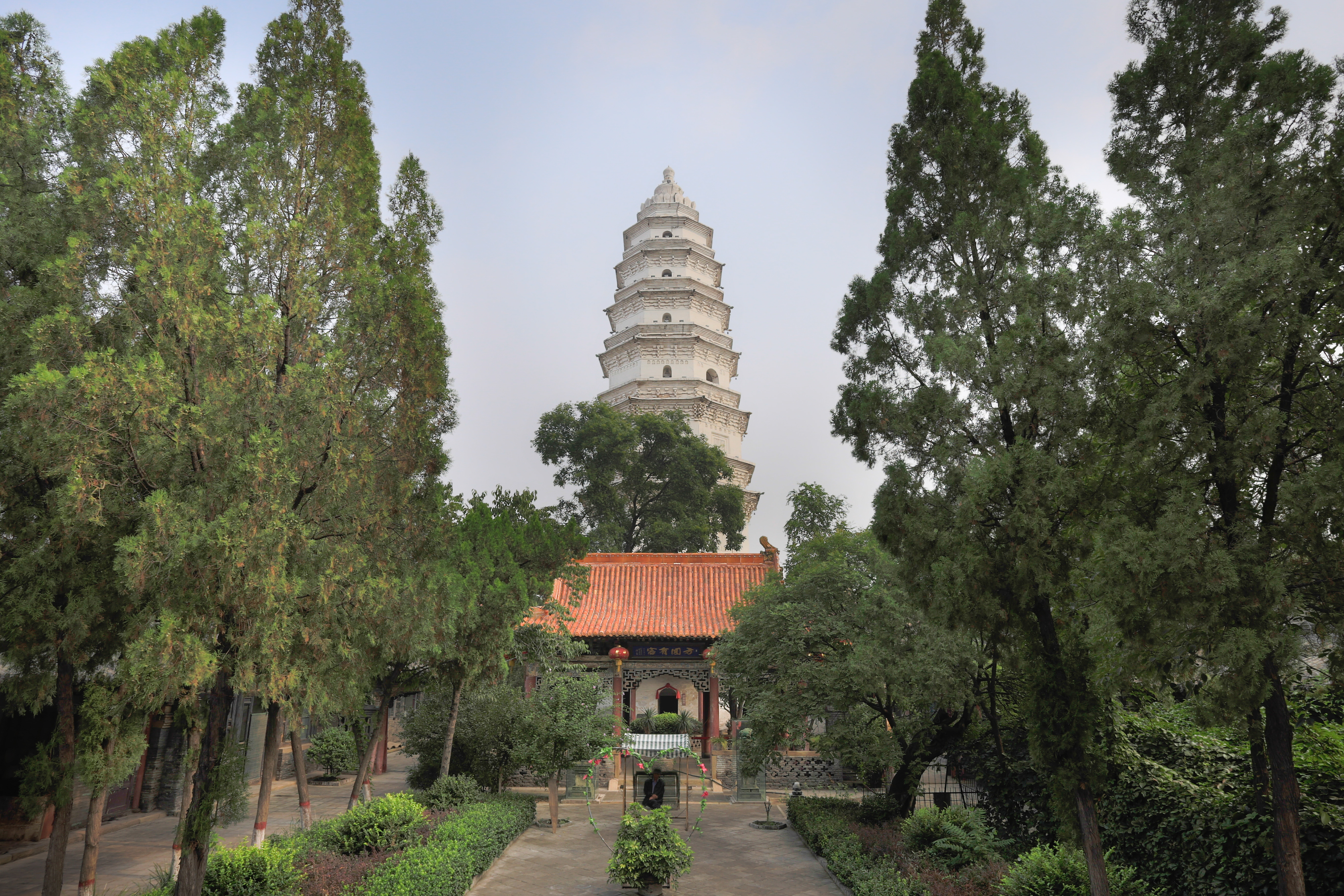
- Wubian Temple

- Location of the city in Shanxi
- Coordinates: 37°25′17″N 112°33′03″E
- Country: People's Republic of China
- Province: Shanxi
- Prefecture-level city: Jinzhong

Area
  - Total: 1,034 km^{2} (399 sq mi)

Population
  - Total: 280,000
  - Density: 270/km^{2} (700/sq mi)
- Time zone: UTC+8 (China Standard)
- Postal code: 030800
- Area code: 0354
- Website: www.taigu.gov.cn

Taigu (Chinese: 太谷; pinyin: Tàigǔ) is a district of Shanxi province, China under the administration of Jinzhong City. It is administratively divided into three town-level entities (Mingxing 明星镇, Hucun 胡村镇, and Fancun 范村镇), and six township-level entities (Houcheng 侯城乡, Beiwang 北汪乡, Shuixiu 水秀乡, Yangyi 阳邑乡, Xiaobai 小白乡, and Rencun 任村乡). Taigu is linked to nearby Yuci in Jinzhong by rail via the Taigu Railway Stop.

== Climate ==
Taigu experiences a humid continental climate (Köppen climate classification Dwa). Spring is dry, with frequent dust storms, followed by early summer heat waves. Summer tends to be hot with most of the year's rainfall concentrated in July and August. Winter is long and cold, but dry and sunny.

Climate data for Taigu, elevation 786 m (2,579 ft), (1991–2020 normals, extremes 1981–present)
Month	Jan	Feb	Mar	Apr	May	Jun	Jul	Aug	Sep	Oct	Nov	Dec	Year
Record high °C (°F)	13.0 (55.4)	21.0 (69.8)	29.2 (84.6)	36.2 (97.2)	36.4 (97.5)	40.5 (104.9)	39.9 (103.8)	35.9 (96.6)	35.6 (96.1)	29.2 (84.6)	23.1 (73.6)	16.9 (62.4)	40.5 (104.9)
Mean daily maximum °C (°F)	2.4 (36.3)	6.9 (44.4)	13.5 (56.3)	20.8 (69.4)	26.3 (79.3)	29.9 (85.8)	30.8 (87.4)	28.9 (84.0)	24.3 (75.7)	18.2 (64.8)	10.3 (50.5)	3.7 (38.7)	18.0 (64.4)
Daily mean °C (°F)	−4.7 (23.5)	−0.7 (30.7)	5.9 (42.6)	13.3 (55.9)	18.9 (66.0)	22.7 (72.9)	24.4 (75.9)	22.6 (72.7)	17.3 (63.1)	10.8 (51.4)	3.4 (38.1)	−2.9 (26.8)	10.9 (51.6)
Mean daily minimum °C (°F)	−10.3 (13.5)	−6.6 (20.1)	−0.6 (30.9)	6.0 (42.8)	11.4 (52.5)	15.9 (60.6)	18.9 (66.0)	17.4 (63.3)	11.7 (53.1)	5.0 (41.0)	−2.1 (28.2)	−8.0 (17.6)	4.9 (40.8)
Record low °C (°F)	−20.6 (−5.1)	−22.7 (−8.9)	−12.7 (9.1)	−7.2 (19.0)	0.1 (32.2)	4.8 (40.6)	10.7 (51.3)	8.2 (46.8)	0.1 (32.2)	−8.5 (16.7)	−20.1 (−4.2)	−23.2 (−9.8)	−23.2 (−9.8)
Average precipitation mm (inches)	2.5 (0.10)	4.5 (0.18)	9.6 (0.38)	25.9 (1.02)	30.2 (1.19)	48.5 (1.91)	99.6 (3.92)	95.0 (3.74)	54.4 (2.14)	32.5 (1.28)	12.7 (0.50)	2.4 (0.09)	417.8 (16.45)
Average precipitation days (≥ 0.1 mm)	2.2	2.5	3.7	5.4	6.0	9.1	10.9	9.7	8.1	6.3	3.4	1.7	69
Average snowy days	3.0	3.9	2.3	0.7	0	0	0	0	0	0.1	2.1	2.6	14.7
Average relative humidity (%)	50	47	44	45	47	56	69	73	71	65	59	53	57
Mean monthly sunshine hours	177.8	184.5	224.8	248.1	272.8	243.8	231.5	219.4	196.2	199.9	177.8	174.9	2,551.5
Percentage possible sunshine	58	60	60	63	62	55	52	53	53	58	59	59	58
Source: China Meteorological Administration

== Government ==
Downtown Taigu contains the local government institutions and buildings supporting the needs of the district. Significant buildings include the Taigu People's Government Building, Taigu People's Court Building, and Taigu People's Procuratorate Building.

== Industry ==
While economic activity in the Taigu area is primarily agricultural, major non-agricultural industries in Taigu include production of malleable cast iron, cast steel, insulator fittings, radiator piping, and other small industrial components.

== Education ==
Notable academic institutions include: Shanxi Agricultural University, on the former site of the Ming Hsien schools established by the Oberlin Shansi Memorial Association, founded in 1907, and located on the eastern side of downtown Taigu, is one of the few remaining Chinese agricultural universities situated in a farming area, and Taigu Normal University.

Taigu Senior High School is also regarded as one of the best in the region. The school includes boarding facilities for students attending from areas outside commuting range.

The Shanxi Taigu Middle School, in eastern downtown Taigu, Taigu No. 2 Middle School, in northern downtown, and Taigu No. 3 Middle School, located in the southern portion of downtown, are also of locally significant size.

Taigu also contains several vocational-track educational institutions, including the Shanxi Theater Career College, as well as the Shanxi Traffic Senior Vestibule School, both in downtown Taigu.

== Health ==
Taigu is the site of People's Hospital No. 2, a large hospital serving the region.

== Transportation ==
Downtown Taigu is served by many taxis for hire, as well as approximately six bus lines, designated T01 through T06. In addition, Taigu is linked to nearby Yuci in Jinzhong by rail via the Taigu Railway Station. However, residents traveling longer distances sometimes prefer simply to take the approximately one-hour drive to the provincial capital of Taiyuan where they can directly take high and low speed trains to Beijing and other major cities.

There are three railway stations in Taigu District:

- Taigu railway station, the most central, on the Datong–Puzhou railway
- Taigu West railway station on the Datong–Xi'an high-speed railway
- Taigu East railway station on the Taiyuan–Jiaozuo high-speed railway

== Culture ==
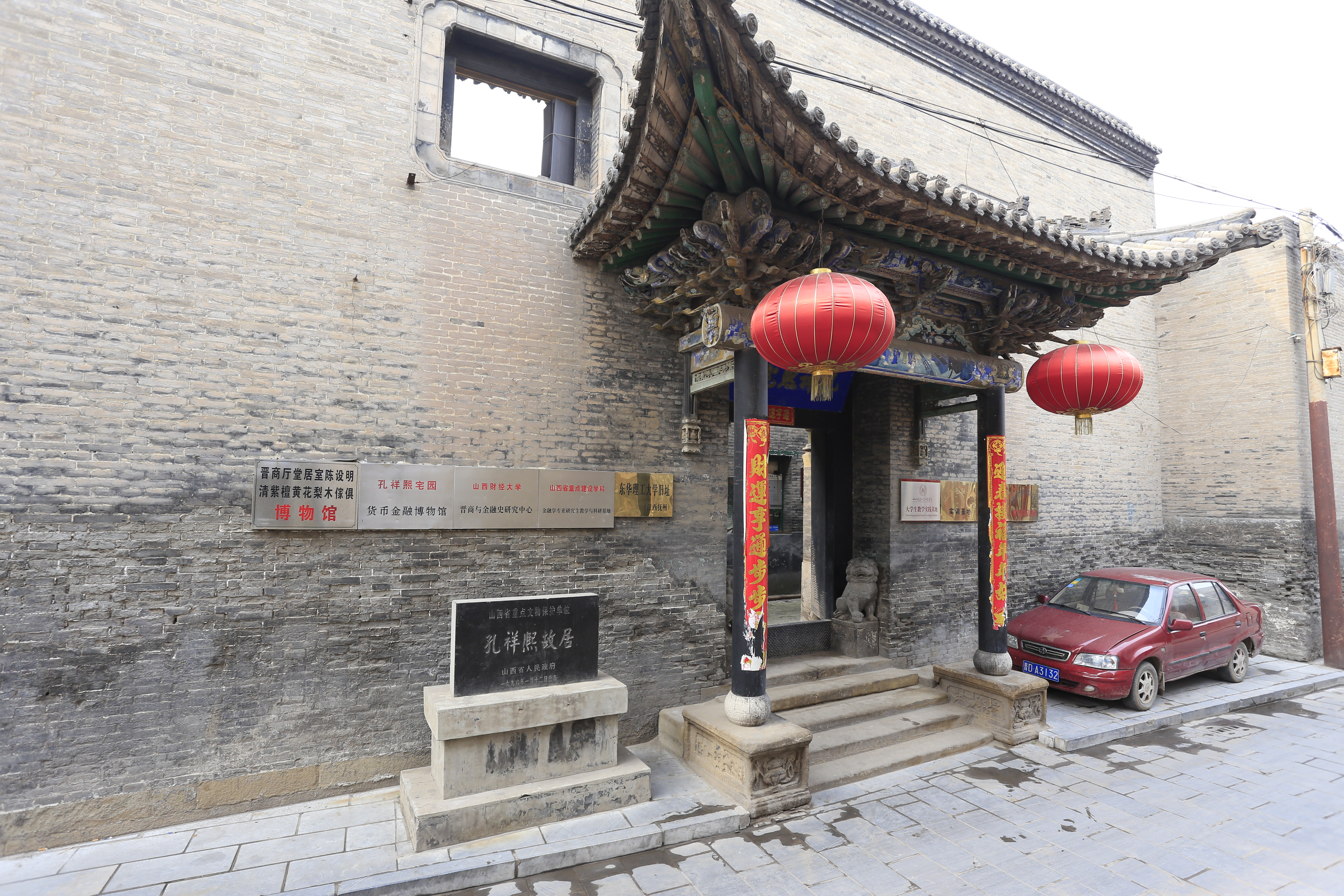
The former residence of H. H. Kung

The most famous tourist attractions in Taigu are examples of Shanxi Courtyard Houses. One of the most known is Kong Family Compound, also known as the Former Kong Xiangxi Residence (designated as a Key Cultural Relic of Shanxi Province). This site is a well-preserved example of mid-Qing dynasty architecture typical of wealthy Chinese families during the period.

Most recently occupied by H. H. Kung (transliterated by pinyin as "Kong Xiangxi"), a wealthy Chinese banker and politician active in the Nationalist government in the 1930s and 1940s, the compound contains examples of traditional courtyard-style living arrangements, temples, areas set aside for young women to separate them from young men, as well as a small exhibit detailing the life of Kung. The site is located in central Taigu just northwest of the Pangzhuang Reservoir off of 319 Sheng Dao road.

Another example of Shanxi Courtyard Houses found in Taigu is a site known as Cao's Courtyard Houses, a UNESCO World Heritage site tentative list of March 2008. The site occupies a total area of 10,600sq m (of which 6,384sq m are buildings), and contains Ming, Qing, and Republic of China era structures. 277 rooms are found in total across several multi-story buildings, halls, towers, and yards. The Cao Family Mansion is located just north of Beiwang.

Additionally, Taigu also contains several halls, temples and structures of cultural significance. The Sanduo Hall in Beiwang has well-preserved stonework. Downtown is the Drum Tower. Just to the west of downtown Taigu in Mingxing one can visit the picturesque Northern Song dynasty Wubian Temple and White Tower Chinese pagoda (also known as the Boundless Pagoda). Also located in Taigu are the Ming dynasty Dacheng Hall of the Temple of Confucius, and Song dynasty Anchan Temple. Guanghua Temple in Baicheng Village is another common visitor attraction, as well as Jingxin Temple near Dongyangyi Village and Zhengsheng Temple in Fancun.

== Food & Drink ==
The traditional foods of northern China are common in Taigu, including the broad preference for noodles over rice. Taigu itself is also known for several special kinds of food.

Taigu Cake is well known in Shanxi and sometimes attributed as kind of Taiyuan food. This is a soft, sweet and moist kind of small baked cake made with a cake blank, sesame, and a sweet red bean filling, all topped with large amounts of sugar.

Guilingji wine is produced locally and very popular as a component of traditional Chinese medicine with several various health benefits.
