= Mary Frank =

American painter (born 1933)

- Born: Mary Lockspeiser; 4 February 1933 (age 93); London, England
- Citizenship: UK; USA
- Known for: Painting, printmaking, sculpture
- Spouse(s): Robert Frank (m. 1950–1969) (divorced); Leo Treitler (m. 1995)
- Children: 2

Mary Frank (née Lockspeiser; born 4 February 1933) is a British and American visual artist who works as a sculptor, painter, printmaker, draftswoman, and illustrator.

== Biography ==
Untitled (Prone Man, Two Trees) by Mary Frank

Frank was born in London, the only child of Eleanore Lockspeiser (née Weinstein; 1900–1986), an American painter, and Edward Lockspeiser (1905–1973), an English musicologist and art critic.

In 1939, at the beginning of World War II, she left London for a series of boarding schools and then was sent in 1940 to live with her maternal grandparents, Gregory and Eugenie Weinstein in Brooklyn, New York.

She studied modern dance with Martha Graham from 1945 to 1950 and was admitted to the High School of Music & Art in New York in 1947. In 1949, she transferred to the Professional Children's School, where she majored in dance. While in high school, she met Robert Frank, a Swiss photographer, whom she married in 1950. About this time she studied wood carving at Alfred van Loen's studio. She also studied drawing with Max Beckmann at the Brooklyn Museum Art School in New York and briefly with Hans Hofmann in 1951 and 1954.

By this time she had two children: Pablo (named after Picasso; born 7 February 1951) and Andrea (born 21 April 1953). After her husband, Robert Frank, gained a Guggenheim Fellowship in 1955 she travelled with him and the children the following two years across the United States.

Frank first exhibited her drawings in 1958 at the Poindexter Gallery in New York City. In 1969, she began her relationship with the Zabriskie Gallery in New York. Inspired by the sculpture and pottery of Margaret Ponce Israel, she began working in clay. It was also in that year that Frank illustrated the children's book, Buddha, by the author Joan Lebols Cohen.

In 1969, she divorced Robert Frank. On 28 December 1974, her 21-year-old daughter, Andrea, was killed in a plane crash in Guatemala. About a year later her son Pablo, who suffered from schizophrenia, developed Hodgkin's lymphoma. He died on 11 November 1994, aged 43, at Lehigh Valley Hospital, Salisbury Township, Pennsylvania.

Mary Frank currently lives and works in Lake Hill, New York and in New York City. Since 1995, she has been married to Leo Treitler, a pianist and music scholar.

Frank's career spans five decades. She is largely self-taught and had no formal training as a sculptor. She was elected to the American Academy and Institute of Arts and Letters in 1984, the recipient of numerous awards and honors including two Guggenheim Foundation Fellowship Awards in 1973 and 1983, the Lee Krasner Award of the Pollock-Krasner Foundation in 1993 and the Joan Mitchell Grant Award in 1995. In 1990 she was elected into the National Academy of Design as an Associate member, and became a full Academician in 1994. Working as a professor at Bard College (Annandale-on-Hudson, New York), Frank was honored with the title of Milton Avery Chair, Distinguished Professor.

Currently, she has works included in the permanent collections of the Hirshhorn Museum and Sculpture Garden, Metropolitan Museum of Art, the Minneapolis Institute of Art, the Whitney Museum of American Art, the Museum of Modern Art, the Brooklyn Museum, the Crystal Bridges Museum of American Art, the National Museum of American Art at the Smithsonian Institution, the Pennsylvania Academy of Fine Arts, the Princeton University Art Museum, the Kemper Museum of Contemporary Art, the Grounds For Sculpture, the Weatherspoon Art Museum, the Everson Museum of Art, the University of Michigan Museum of Art, the Library of Congress, the Art Institute of Chicago, the Museum of Art at Yale University, the Jewish Museum, the Whitney Museum, Boston's Museum of Fine Arts, the Fine Arts Museums of San Francisco.

== Works ==
- Persephone (Ceramic sculpture, 1989)
- Messenger (Cast bronze sculpture, 1991–92)
- What Color Lament? (Oil and collage on board, 1991–93)
- Knowing by Heart (closed) (Acrylic, oil, and collage on panel, 1997)
- Knowing by Heart (open) (Acrylic, oil, and collage on panel, 1997)
- This is the Remembering (closed) (Oil and acrylic on panel, 1996–97)
- This is the Remembering (open) (Oil and acrylic on panel, 1996–97)
- Migration (closed) (Acrylic, oil, and collage on panel, 1998–99)
- Migration (open) (Acrylic, oil, and collage on panel, 1998–99)
- Where or When? (closed) (Acrylic, oil and collage on panel, 1998–99)
- Where or When? (open) (Acrylic, oil and collage on panel, 1998–99)
- Ballad (closed) (Acrylic, oil and collage on panel, 1997–99)
- Ballad (open) (Acrylic, oil and collage on panel, 1997–99)
- Creature (Oil on panel, 1999)

== Bibliography ==
- Rosen, Randy, and Catherine C. Brawer. Making Their Mark: Women Artists Move into the Mainstream, 1970-85. New York: Abbeville Press, 1988.
- Mary Frank: Recent Paintings and Pastels, 1996 (exhibition catalogue), DC Moore Gallery, 1996
- D'Souza, Aruna (March 2001). "Mary Frank and the Search for Self". Art in America. 89: 114–121.
- Mary Frank: Experiences, 2003 (exhibition catalogue), DC Moore Gallery, 2003
- Mary Frank: Paintings and Works on Paper, 2006 (exhibition catalogue), DC Moore Gallery, 2006
- Nochlin, Linda, and Maura Reilly. Women Artists: The Linda Nochlin Reader, 2015.

== See also ==
- Inscape (visual art)

== Sources ==
- Davenport, Ray, "Davenport's Art Reference and Price Guide, Gold Edition" (Ventura, California, 2005) ISSN 1540-1553; OCLC 18196910
- Nochlin, Linda; Mary Frank; and Judy Collischan; Mary Frank : encounters (Purchase, NY: Neuberger Museum of Art, Purchase College, State University of New York; New York : Harry N. Abrams, 2000) ISBN 0-8109-6723-5; ISBN 0-934032-14-9; OCLC 43708504
