= William A. Owens =

American author, folklorist and educator

William A. Owens, (November 2, 1905 – December 9, 1990), was an American writer, folklorist and educator.

== Biography ==
Owens was born in Pin Hook, Lamar County, Texas. He was born to Charlie and Jessie Ann Chennault Owens. He grew up in rural poverty, his father died when he was only 3 months old and was educated at a one-room school. He worked his way through college attending East Texas State Normal College in Commerce (now Texas A&M-Commerce), Paris Junior College and graduated from Southern Methodist University with a Bachelor of Arts in English in 1932. He received a PhD in English from the University of Iowa in 1941.

In 1940, Owens made a live recording of Roosevelt "Grey Ghost" Williams singing "Hitler Blues," a song written by Williams. The song received mention in TIME magazine and was broadcast by BBC Radio on a program hosted by Alistair Cooke in 1940 about the American musical response to World War II. This recording was instrumental to the development of Williams' career.

Owens was in the United States Army from June 1942 to October 1945 and was awarded the Legion of Merit for his work in the intelligence service in the Philippines. He served in Luzon, Philippines with the 306th Counter Intelligence Corps Detachment. He became a technical sergeant and later commissioned as a second lieutenant.

Owens taught at Wesley College in Greenville, Texas, Mississippi State College in Starkville and Texas A&M College in College Station, Texas. He taught at Columbia University from 1945 to 1974. He is the father of author and professor Jessie Ann Owens.

== Partial bibliography ==
- Texas Folk Songs (PhD thesis). University of Iowa. June 1941.
- Slave Mutiny: The Revolt of the Schooner Amistad (1953) An account of the slave rebellion on the schooner La Amistad ISBN 1-57478-004-2
- Look to the River (New York, Atheneum, 1963) OCLC 912982145
- This Stubborn Soil: A Frontier Boyhood (1966) An autobiographical account of growing up in Pin Hook, Texas
- Three Friends: Roy Bedichek, J. Frank Dobie, Walter Prescott Webb (1969), Garden City, New York: Doubleday
- A Season of Weathering (1973)
- Eye-Deep in Hell (1989) An autobiographical account of his time in the intelligence service in the Philippines

== External sources ==
- Handbook of Texas Online
- William T Pilkington William A Owens, Southwest Writers Series (Number 17, 1968)
- Owens Centennial Celebration Paris Junior College
- Trantham, Ann Caldwell. A Readers Theatre Script Based on the Writings of William A. Owens, thesis, August 1977; Denton, Texas. (digital.library.unt.edu/ark:/67531/metadc663281/: accessed March 9, 2018), University of North Texas Libraries, Digital Library, digital.library.unt.edu; .
