= Steve Swayne =

American musician

Steven R. Swayne is a professor of music and currently music department chair at Dartmouth College. He has authored a study of the music of American musical theater composer Stephen Sondheim and a biography of American composer and educator William Schuman. Swayne is a native of Los Angeles, California and is a graduate of John Muir High School and Occidental College. He has graduate degrees from Fuller Theological Seminary (M.Div.) and the University of California, Berkeley (MA, Ph.D.). He has taught musicianship at UC Berkeley and at the San Francisco Conservatory of Music, and he has worked as a pianist at Nordstrom. He also plays the piano in concerts and has performed with the San Francisco Symphony under the direction of Michael Tilson Thomas. He has a Christmas CD called "Holiday Twists" and a CD of the preludes of Frédéric Chopin, Gabriel Fauré, and George Gershwin.

In 2019, he was elected president of the American Musicological Society. In March 2022, he joined the John W. Kluge Center at the Library of Congress as Chair in Modern Culture.

== Works ==
- How Sondheim Found His Sound, University of Michigan Press (2005; paperback, 2007), ISBN 978-0-472-03229-7
- Orpheus in Manhattan: William Schuman and the Shaping of America's Musical Life, Oxford University Press, USA (2011), ISBN 978-0-19-538852-7
