= Charles M. Atkinson =

American musicologist and writer

- Education: University of New Mexico; University of Michigan; University of North Carolina at Chapel Hill
- Occupations: Musicologist, writer

Charles M. Atkinson is an American musicologist and writer. He was a university distinguished professor in the department of music at Ohio State University.

Atkinson attended the University of New Mexico, earning his BFA degree in 1963. He also attended the University of Michigan, earning his MM degree in 1965, and earned his PhD degree in musicology at the University of North Carolina at Chapel Hill in 1975. In 1977, he published his first journal in the Journal of the American Musicological Society, and in 2009, he wrote the book The Critical Nexus: Tone-System, Mode and Notation in Early Medieval Music, published by Oxford University Press.

In 2015, Atkinson was awarded the Haskins Medal by the Medieval Academy of America, and in 2021, he was awarded an honorary doctorate from the University of Würzburg.
