= Amy Lynn Wlodarski =

American music historian

- Occupation: Historian
- Awards: Guggenheim Fellowship (2024)

Academic background
- Education: Middlebury College; Eastman School of Music
- Thesis: The Sounds of Memory: German Musical Representations of the Holocaust, 1945–1965 (2006)
- Doctoral advisor: Kim H. Kowalke

Academic work
- Discipline: Music history
- Sub-discipline: Jewish music
- Institutions: Dickinson College

Amy Lynn Wlodarski is an American music historian. A 2024 Guggenheim Fellow, she is the author of Musical Witness and Holocaust Representation (2015) and George Rochberg, American Composer (2019) and is a professor at Dickinson College.

== Biography ==
Amy Wlodarski was born to Terri and Fred Wlodarski, and her maternal grandmother was among millions subject to forced labour under German rule during World War II. She attended Orono High School in Orono, Maine, and she obtained her BA (1997) at Middlebury College and MA (2001) and PhD (2006) at Eastman School of Music; her doctoral dissertation The Sounds of Memory: German Musical Representations of the Holocaust, 1945–1965 was supervised by Kim H. Kowalke. As an undergraduate, she initially intended to be a chemistry major. During her postgraduate studies, she was given a German-American Fulbright Program scholarship to study at Free University of Berlin and spent some time living in the Greater Boston area for her doctorate.

Wlodarski moved to Dickinson College in 2005, and she began working as a professor there. She won the Oral History Association Postsecondary Teaching Award in 2010. She became the Charles A. Dana Endowed Chair in 2021. She was a resident director for Dickinson's abroad study program in Italy from 2022 until 2024.

Wlodarski specializes in the relationship between Jewish music and World War II and the Holocaust. In 2011, she and Elaine Kelly were co-editors of Art Outside the Lines, an essay volume on the East German arts. She won the 2016 Lewis Lockwood Award for her book Musical Witness and Holocaust Representation, which its publisher Cambridge University Press called the "first musicological study entirely devoted to a comprehensive analysis of musical Holocaust representations in the Western art music tradition". She won the 2020 Book Prize of the American Musicological Society Jewish Studies and Music Group for her next book George Rochberg, American Composer (2020), which explores how George Rochberg's personal trauma influenced his work.

In 2022, Wlodarski became editor-in-chief of the Journal of the American Musicological Society. In 2024, she was awarded a Guggenheim Fellowship in Music Research; as part of the fellowship, her next historical project is on the international reception of the Viktor Ullmann opera Der Kaiser von Atlantis.

Outside of academia, Wlodarski also works as Dickinson's choir director, as well as a live event presenter at operas and philharmonics.

On July 12, 2008, she married Jeremy Ball, a history professor at Dickinson. She has two children.

== Bibliography ==
- (ed. with Elaine Kelly) Art Outside the Lines (2011)
- Musical Witness and Holocaust Representation (2015)
- George Rochberg, American Composer (2019)
