= Oberlin Shansi Memorial Association =

Non-profit organization

Oberlin Shansi Memorial Association, situated on the campus of Oberlin College in Oberlin, Ohio, is an independent non-profit organization whose goal is "to promote understanding and communication between Asians and Americans. This is accomplished through individual and group educational and social programs, educational and cultural exchanges, and community projects." Founded in January 1908, the original purpose was to memorialize the members of the Oberlin Band who were killed in Shansi province, China, during the Boxer Uprising in 1900. Beginning in 1918, the Oberlin student body elected graduating students as Representatives (now Fellows) to teach English and support extracurricular activities at the Ming Hsien School in Taigu, Shansi. This tradition was interrupted at the time of the Korean War in 1951 but resumed in 1980. Today the Association, in association with Oberlin College maintains partner sites in Japan, Indonesia, India, and China, as well as hosting scholars and artists from the partner countries to the Oberlin College campus.

== History ==
In 1881 students at the Oberlin Graduate School of Theology decided to form into a group, "The Oberlin Band," to do mission work in China's then remote Shansi Province (now romanized as "Shanxi") under the American Board of Commissioners for Foreign Missions (ABCFM). In 1900 thirteen of them and many Chinese Christians were killed in the Taiyuan Massacre during the Boxer Uprising. In the aftermath, a well connected young Christian, H. H. Kung helped administer the Boxer Indemnity funds and secured a piece of land for the use of the mission. In Oberlin, the ABCFM erected a Memorial Arch with the inscription, "The Blood of the Martyrs is the Seed of the Church."

After Kung earned degrees at Oberlin College and Yale University, he returned to his native Taigu in 1909 and established a set of schools, the Ming Hsien (for boys) and Beilu (for girls), which constituted "Oberlin-in-China." In the 1920s Ming Hsien became co-educational, the first school in Shanxi to do so. A village reconstruction center devoted to literacy education, public health and agricultural improvement was established nearby. In 1937, Ming Hsien, to avoid the Japanese invasion, moved to a site just outside Chengdu in Sichuan, returning to Taigu in 1949. After the outbreak of the Korean War in 1951, the school was closed and the building made the basis of the Shanxi Agricultural University. Formal relations with Oberlin were not renewed until 1980.

In the following years, Oberlin Shansi created new exchange relationships with Tunghai University in Taiwan, a relation which lasted until 1978; with The American college in Madurai, Lady Doak College in Madurai, south India; and other institutions in Indonesia and Korea; and Oberlin University in Tokyo.

Although in the early period the tone was distinctly Christian and the goal was Christian service, the Association focused on educational and cultural work, and was never a religious mission. As the prospect of returning to China emerged in the 1970s, mention of Christianity was removed from the Regulations. The early work was financially supported from gifts and student fees, but much of the endowment was given by the estate of Charles Martin Hall, an Oberlin graduate and founder of Alcoa.

Observers have noted the "Oberlin spirit" – ideals of academic excellence, service, and international peace and friendship – which gave the enterprise a missionary tone and sometimes ethnocentrism (particularly in the Association's early years).

A number Shansi Reps and Fellows went on to influential careers, particularly in Asian Studies. In 2012, Carl Jacobson, who served as executive director from 1982, was succeeded by Gavin Tritt.
