= Music of Venice =

The city of Venice in Italy has played an important role in the development of the music of Italy. The Venetian state—i.e. the medieval and Early Modern Maritime Republic of Venice—was often popularly called the "Republic of Music", and an anonymous Frenchman of the 17th century is said to have remarked that "In every home, someone is playing a musical instrument or singing. There is music everywhere."

== Historical background ==
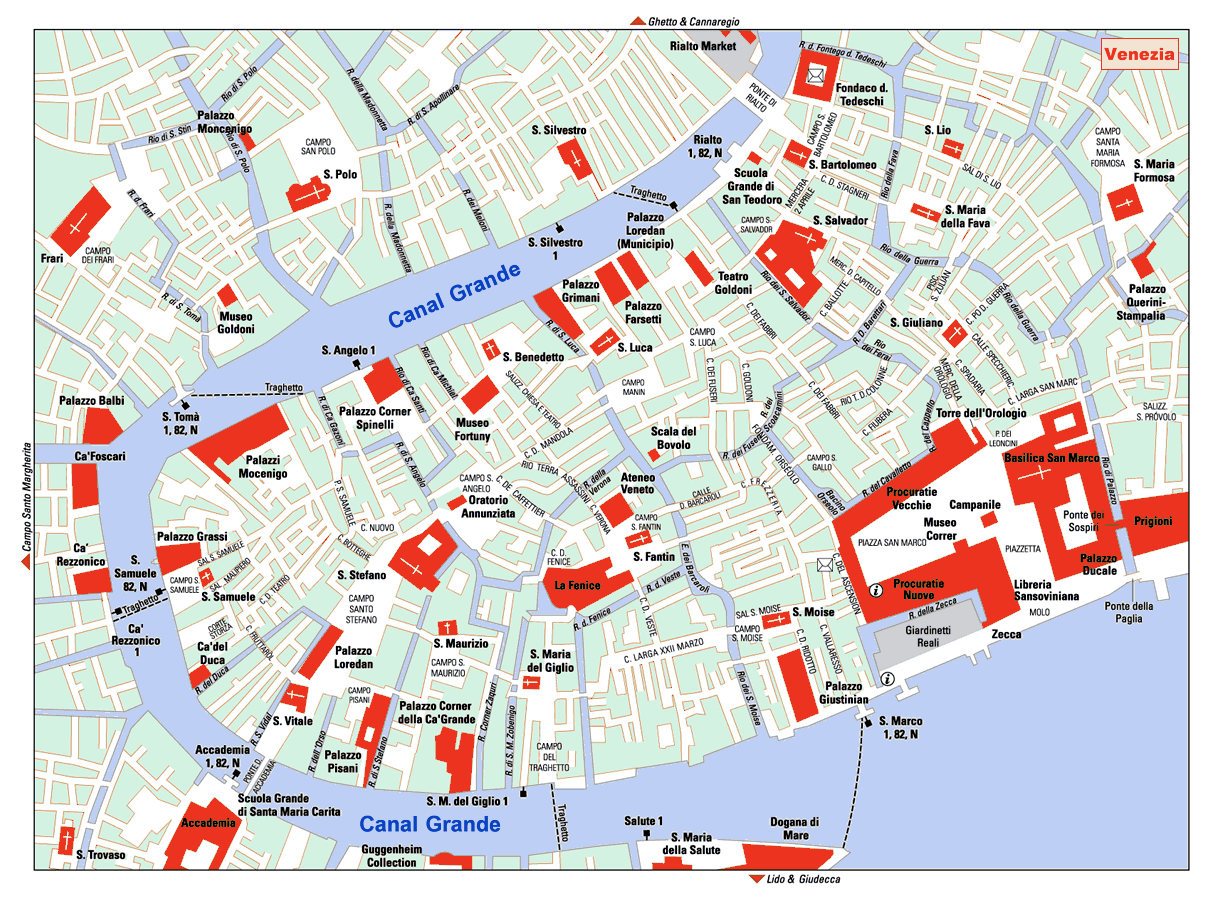
Map of Venice (historical center)

=== Introduction ===
The rich history of music in Venice extends back to the founding of the city in the early Middle Ages, although relatively little is known about music prior to the 15th century. Because of the wide geographical span of its trade relations with both the East and the West, it was continuously influenced by styles that originated in many parts of Europe, North Africa, and the Middle East. Although Venice bred a great many musicians of rare skill, the Republic frequently searched for talented performers and composers through diplomatic networks.

Important chapters in the development of instrumental music were written in Venice: for lute and for organ in the 16th century, for instrumental ensemble in the 17th, and for virtuoso performance in the 18th. The institution of opera theaters, open to a fee-paying public in 1637, followed a long period of private performance before noble audiences of plays with musical numbers. The relationship of these commedie to early opera remain a little-explored area. Festive church music, often performed before the same select audiences as private concerts of instrumental and vocal music, was what many visitors remembered the longest. Even the traditional barcarola tunes sung by Venetian gondoliers developed into an important genre of classical music.

The many transformations that Venetian culture underwent in connection with the collapse of the Republic (1797), the turbulence of Napoleonic rule, the strictures of Austrian administration, and the vicissitudes of the Italian state (since 1866) have left their distinct marks on the music made in Venice. Venice has remained an important venue for the gestation of new music through the activities of such composers as Nino Rota, Luigi Nono, and several others. The Veneto continues to breed musicians and ensembles of the highest rank.

=== Church music ===
Venice developed a distinctive tradition of church music. There were services with elaborate music at St Mark's Basilica and other buildings in the city. The seminal Venetian composer to emerge from this creative milieu was Claudio Monteverdi (see Vespro della Beata Vergine published in 1610). Others were Andrea Gabrieli and Giovanni Gabrieli, both known for antiphonal compositions of brass music, derived for the acoustics of the Basilica. The Gabrielis established the pinnacle of brass antiphonal effect with double and triple choirs, complete with dynamic markings, and spatial location direction. Brass players to this day remain indebted to the Gabrielis for their contributions to the literature. The Sacrae Symphoniae (1597) and Canzoni (1608) are among the first published works of music.

=== Opera in Venice ===
While early opera of the late 1590s was put on for private audiences in Florence, opera as a commercial endeavor started in Venice in the 1630s with performances in the new Teatro Tron in the parish of S. Cassiano, the first opera house ever opened to the public. A second theater, the Teatro di SS. Giovanni e Paolo was also opened for opera. Then in 1640 came the Teatro San Moisè and in 1641 the Teatro Novissimo. Crucial to the successful beginnings of opera in Venice was the presence of Claudio Monteverdi, whose move to that city from Mantua in 1613 rejuvenated the musical life of Venice. The success of Monteverdi and opera in Venice led directly to the opening of similar theaters elsewhere in Italy. In Naples, for example, the first opera house, the San Bartolomeo Theater, was opened in 1621, when the public was invited to hear the "new music from the north"—"musica Veneziana" (Venetian music).

In Venice, the opera season corresponded to the Carnevale—that is, the weeks leading up to Lent. Operatic productions decreased a bit in the late 17th century, but picked up as theaters started charging prices that more people could afford.

The social function of the opera and the timing of the opera season in Venice go hand in hand. Carnevale was a time of the year when Venice was an international meeting ground, a time when matters besides music were discussed, even at the opera. Theaters were forums for the rich and powerful to discuss the present and the future of the Venetian Republic in its wars against the Turks, for example.

=== Orphanages ===
Historically, the four most important "hospitals" in the Republic of Venice (besides caring for the sick and elderly) were, in fact, orphanages where young children might be taught a useful trade. One of these trades was music; thus, the hospitals developed into true music conservatories of the day. Antonio Vivaldi taught at the Ospedale della Pietà. (Compare the similar function of Spanish orphanages/conservatories in Naples.)

== Current venues and activities ==
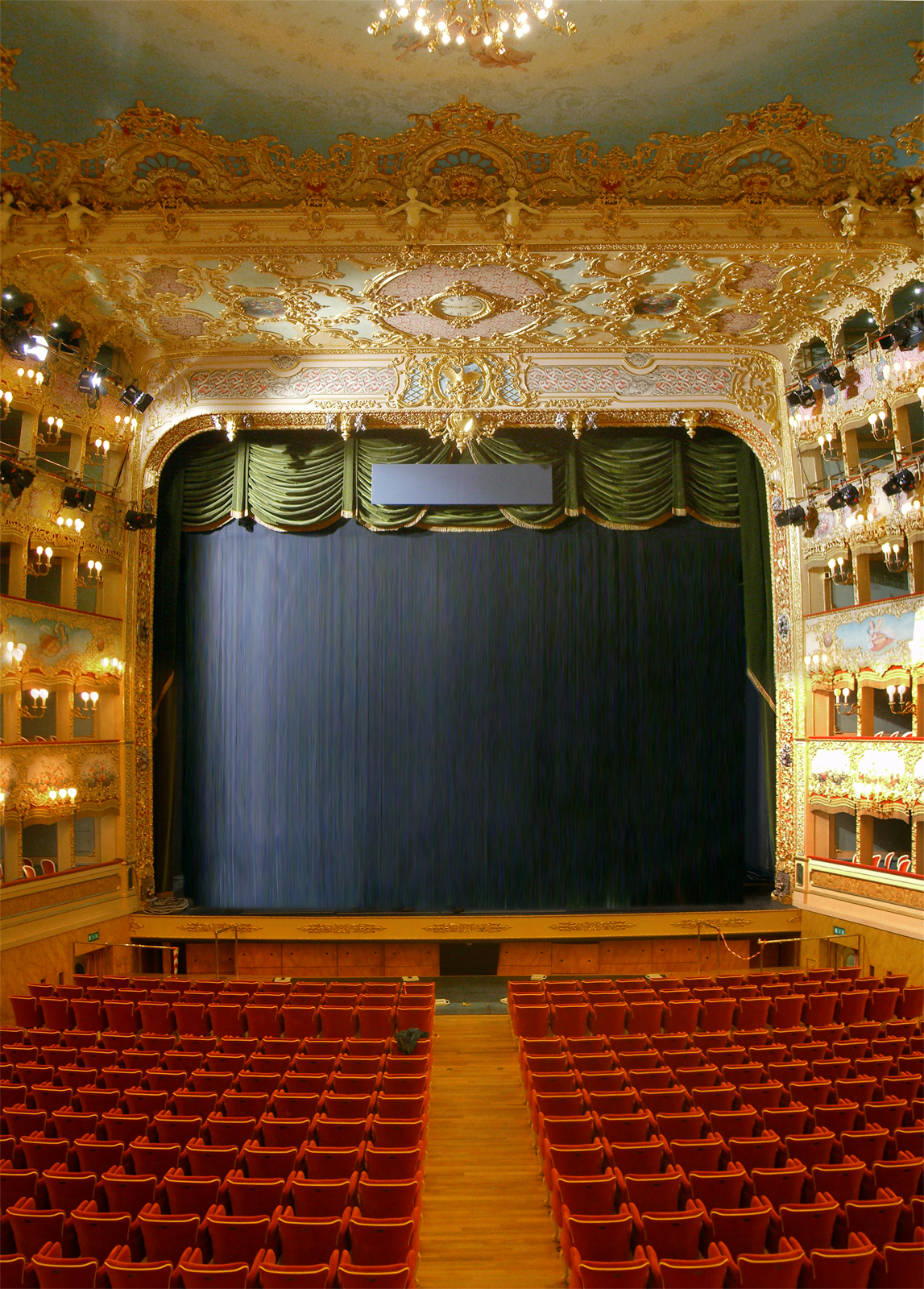
Interior of La Fenice

The best-known opera house in Venice and one of the most famous in the world is La Fenice, built in 1786. After a disastrous fire in 1996, it was rebuilt and is again open. The theater hosts many of the musical events for the Venice Biennale, a running festival of art, music, architecture, dance, cinema and music. The Biennale was started in the 1890s and has developed a reputation as an important venue for modern composers and contemporary music. Other venues for the Biennale are the Teatro Piccolo Arsenale, Teatro alle Tese, and the Teatro Verde.

The city has a music conservatory, named after Benedetto Marcello，It is the most historic and famous conservatory in Italy. It stems from the 1867 and is currently housed in Palazzo Piani, Its famous alumni include Ermanno Wolf-Ferrari、Gian Francesco Malipiero、Toti Dal Monte、Bruno Maderna、Luigi Nono、Maria Chiara、Katia Ricciarelli、Lucia Valentini Terrani、Giuseppe Sinopoli、Sara Mingardo、Luciana D'intino and many more，Lua prominent villa from the 17th century. The Basilica of San Marco, one of the most recognizable buildings in the world, has had choirmasters since 1318 (!), including names such as Monteverdi. The Sansovino Library is a treasure trove of music manuscripts, including 17th-century opera scores by Francesco Cavalli.

Many of Antonio Vivaldi's manuscripts are preserved by the Giorgio Cini foundation in the premises of the Antonio Vivaldi Foundation on the tiny island of San Giorgio. The island is home to a number of other musical foundations and is an important site for classical concerts during the year. One of the most important organizations for music research and preservation is the Ugo and Olga Levi Foundation. The foundation sponsors the Fenice Archives, and its historical documents facilitated the recent restoration of La Fenice opera house. The city also hosts an annual series of lectures and concerts dedicated to composer Richard Wagner.

== The orchestras ==
Venice has many orchestras of music: Orchestra della Fenice, Rondò Veneziano, Interpreti Veneziani, and Venice Baroque Orchestra.

== See also ==
- Music of Veneto
