= Carl Engel =

American pianist & composer (1883-1944)

Carl Engel (July 21, 1883 – May 6, 1944) was a French-born American pianist, composer, musicologist and publisher from Paris. He was also president of G. Schirmer, Inc., a writer on music for The Musical Quarterly, and chief of the Music Division of the Library of Congress.

== Compositions ==
=== Voice and Piano ===
- Three Lyrics from the German; G. Saerchinger, 1906
- We Met; W. Maxwell, 1907
- Four Lyrics by C. Fabbri; G. Schirmer, 1908
- Chansons intimes; G. Schirmer, 1910
- Two Lyrics; G. Schirmer, 1911
- Deux simples chansons; Boston Music Co., 1912
- Trois epigrammes; G. Schirmer, 1914
- Trois sonnets; G. Schirmer, 1914
- Christmas Call; Boston Music Co., 1916
- Three Songs; C. Fischer, 1917
- We're In It: And We'll Win It; C. C. Birchard, 1918
- The Never-Lonely Child; Boston Music Co., 1919
- Three Poems of Amy Lowell; G. Schirmer, 1922

=== Violin and Piano ===
- Chant Nuptial; C. Fischer, 1917
- Triptych; Boston Music Co., 1920
- Chanson frivole; G. Schirmer, 1922

=== Piano ===
- Perfumes; C. Fischer, 1917
- Presque valse; G. Schirmer, 1917, posth. pub. 1946

=== Choir ===
- Dawn; C. C. Birchard, 1915
- God Rest Our Glorious Land; C. C. Birchard, 1932
- Lisette; Choudens, 1935
- Charms of Love; Boston Music Co., 1939

=== Wind Band ===
- For Honor and For Home; C. Fischer, 1917
- Academic Processional March; G. Schirmer, 1938

=== Operetta ===
- Way Down South in Dixie; C. C. Birchard, 1924

== Works ==
- "Alla breve, from Bach to Debussy" (New York: G. Schirmer, 1921) ISBN 0-8369-1919-X — short biographies of great composers
