= Shanxi Agricultural University =

Agricultural school in Shanxi, China

Coordinates: 37.4239°N 112.5753°E

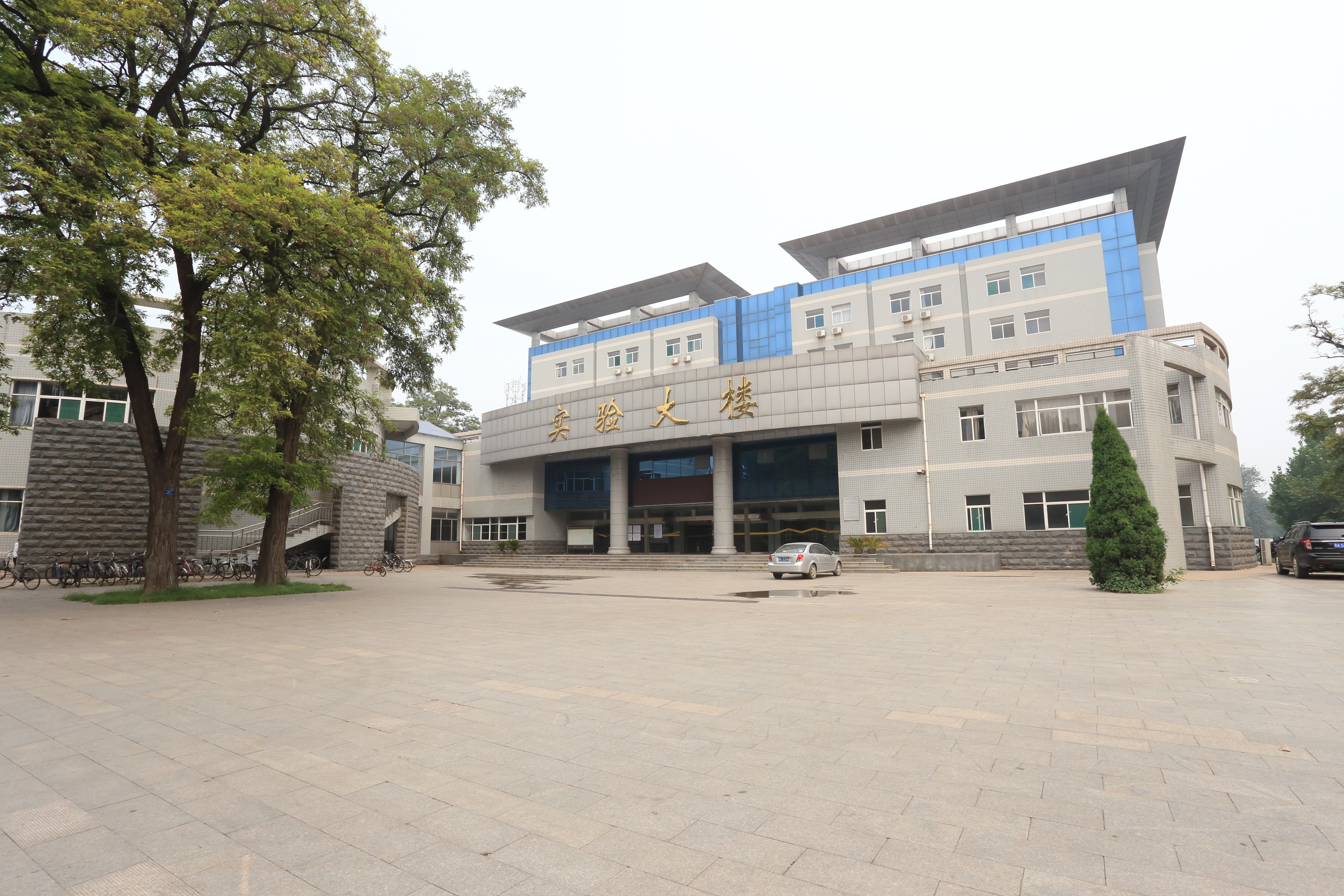

Shanxi Agricultural University (Chinese: 山西农业大学) is a provincial public university in Shanxi, China. It is managed by the Shanxi Provincial People's Government.

It is in the city of Taigu (太谷), a rural area with a population of about 40,000 people.

== History ==
The school was founded in 1907 as the Ming Hsien school by a group of missionaries from Oberlin College, including the financier H.H. Kung, the future husband of Soong Ai-ling, the eldest of the three Song (Soong) sisters.

More precisely, the Oberlin missionaries founded a primary school in Taigu in the 1880s. When he was a boy, H.H. Kung became friends with the missionaries after they cured him of an eye disease. The missionaries were killed in the Boxer Rebellion during the summer of 1900, but Kung was sheltered by his family and survived. A few years later, now a young man, Kung was invited to continue his studies at Oberlin College. After graduating from Oberlin, he obtained his master's degree at Yale and then returned to China.

In 1907 Kung founded Ming Hsien high school in his hometown of Taigu. ("Ming Hsien" means "remember the worthy" and was named in honor of his Oberlin missionary friends.) Beginning in 1908, Oberlin began sending recent graduates to teach at Ming Hsien and support Kung's efforts under the auspices of the Oberlin-Shansi Memorial Association.

In 1950, following the Communist victory in the civil war, Ming Hsien was taken over by the party, turned into a university, and renamed "Shansi Agricultural University." The American teachers from Oberlin were expelled and did not return until 1982, following China's "reform and opening."

In October 2019, with the view to overall reform and development of higher education and agricultural research in Shanxi, Shanxi Provincial Party Committee and Government decided to merge the Shanxi Agricultural University with the Shanxi Academy of Agricultural Sciences into a new Shanxi Agricultural University, ushering in a new chapter of reform and development.

== Academics ==
SXAU has two campuses, Taigu Campus and Taiyuan Longcheng Campus, and research institutes all over the province, among which there are 22 teaching units and 20 directly affiliated research institutes (centers). SXAU encompasses eight academic fields in agriculture, science, engineering, economics, management, humanities, law and art, offering 71 undergraduate specialties. At present, there are one national key discipline of animal genetics, breeding and reproduction, and nine provincial key disciplines, including agricultural engineering, crop science, horticulture, agricultural resources & environment, plant protection, animal husbandry, veterinary medicine, forestry, and grassland science. SXAU now has three disciplines listed on one-percent of global ESI (Essential Science Indicator), namely, Agricultural Science, Plant & Animal Science and Environmental and Ecological Science.

Shanxi Agricultural University has more than 4500 faculty and administrative staff, including, 504 full professors, 1356 associate professors. There are over 27,000 full-time students. Among them, there are 23,948 undergraduate students and 3602 master and doctoral students. Since its establishment, SXAU cultivated more than 150,000 talents of various types among whom 7 have become academicians of Chinese Academy of Sciences and Chinese Academy of Engineering; They have made significant contributions to the economic and social development of Shanxi and the whole country.

The university maintains connections with Oberlin Shansi Memorial Association, a non-profit organization operating out of Oberlin College, engaging in cross-cultural and education exchange programs. Each year, the university hosts young English teachers who have recently graduated from Oberlin College. In addition to the Oberlin Shansi program, Shanxi Agricultural University has established academic relations with universities and research institutions in Germany, Japan, Australia and Britain. The university has received worldwide recognition and has very good collaboration with more than 20 universities, colleges and institutes.
