= Glen Haydon =

Glen Haydon was an American musicologist instrumental in the founding of the Department of Music at the University of North Carolina at Chapel Hill. He remained chair of the department until his death in 1966.

Haydon wrote Introduction to Musicology, one of the first books on the subject written in English.

He also played a key role in the creation of the Music Library at the University. Haydon travelled extensively through Europe during the summers prior to World War II collecting the books and periodicals that would become the nexus of the library's collection. He was a 1934 initiate of the Alpha Rho chapter of Phi Mu Alpha Sinfonia at Carolina.

== Publications ==
- Introduction to Musicology (1941) ISBN 0-313-20429-2
- The Evolution of the Six-Four Chord; A Chapter in the History of Dissonance Treatment (1971) ISBN 0-306-70017-4
