= H. H. Kung =

Chinese banker and politician (1880–1967)

- 孔祥熙
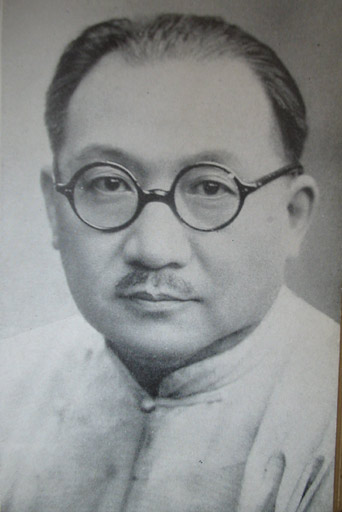

Premier of China
- In office 1 January 1938 – 11 December 1939
- President: Lin Sen
- Vice Premier: Zhang Qun
- Preceded by: Chiang Kai-shek
- Succeeded by: Chiang Kai-shek

Vice Premier of China
- In office 11 December 1939 – 4 June 1945
- Premier: Chiang Kai-shek; T. V. Soong
- Preceded by: Zhang Qun
- Succeeded by: Weng Wenhao
- In office 4 November 1933 – 1 January 1938
- Premier: Lin Sen
- Preceded by: T. V. Soong
- Succeeded by: Zhang Qun

Personal details
- Born: Kung Hsiang-hsi; 11 September 1880 Taigu, Shanxi, Qing Empire
- Died: 16 August 1967 (aged 86) Locust Valley, New York, U.S.
- Party: Kuomintang
- Spouses: Han Yu-mei (m. 1910; died 1913) Soong Ai-ling (m. 1914)
- Children: 4, including Kung Ling-i and David Kung Ling-kan
- Education: Oberlin College (BA); Yale University (MA)

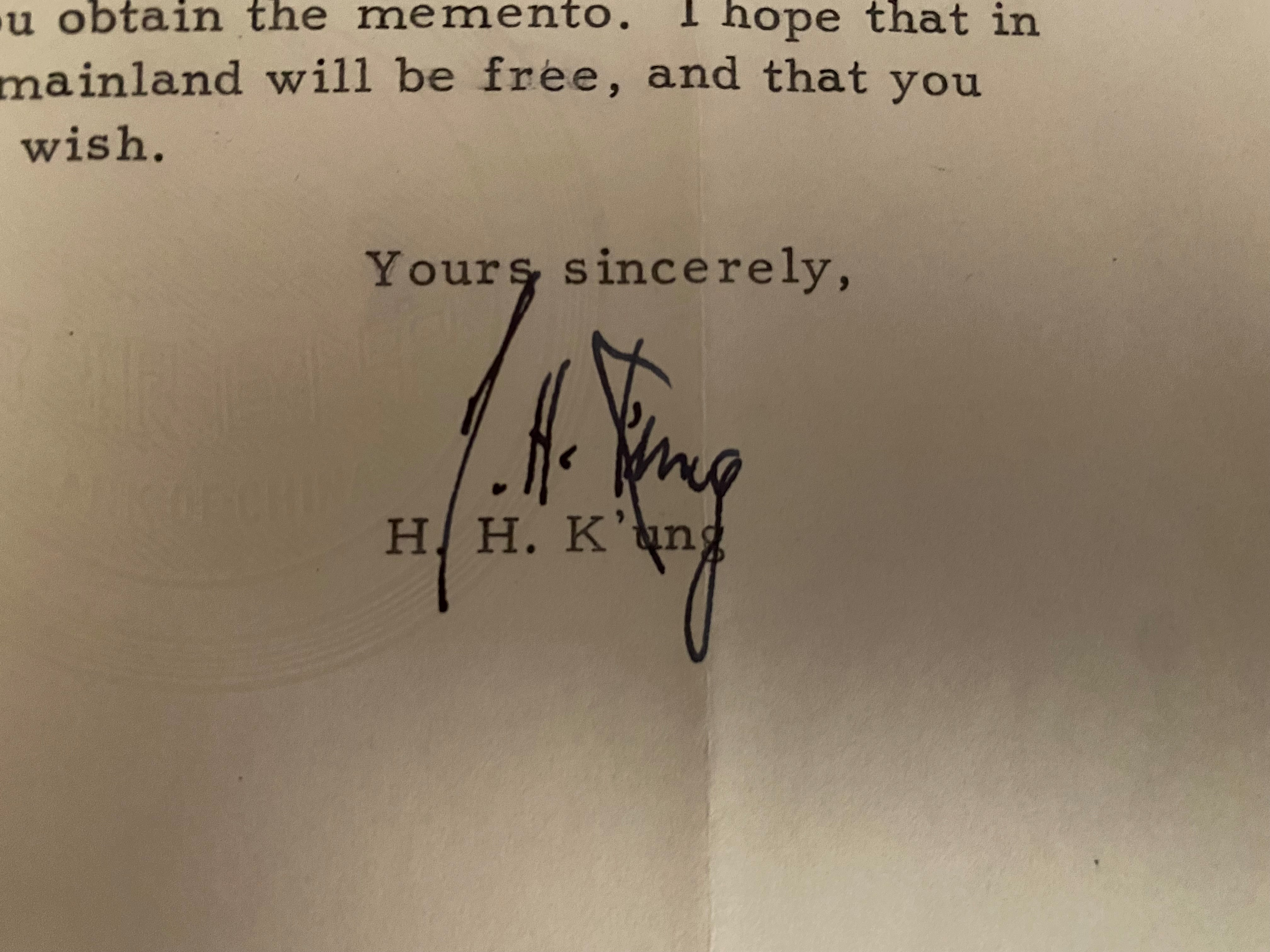
H. H. Kung autograph signature on a letter dated 13 September 1954

Kung Hsiang-hsi (Chinese: 孔祥熙; pinyin: Kǒng Xiángxī; Wade–Giles: K'ung^{³} Hsiang^{²}-hsi^{¹}; 11 September 1880 – 16 August 1967), also known as Dr. Chauncey Kung, was a Chinese banker and government official influential in China's politics and economy of the 1920s through the 1940s. His wife was Soong Ai-ling, the eldest of the three Soong sisters; the other two married President Sun Yat-sen and President Chiang Kai-shek. Together with his brother-in-law, T. V. Soong, he was highly influential in determining the economic policies of the Nationalist Party-led Republic of China (1912–1949) in the 1930s and 1940s.

== Biography ==
=== Early life ===
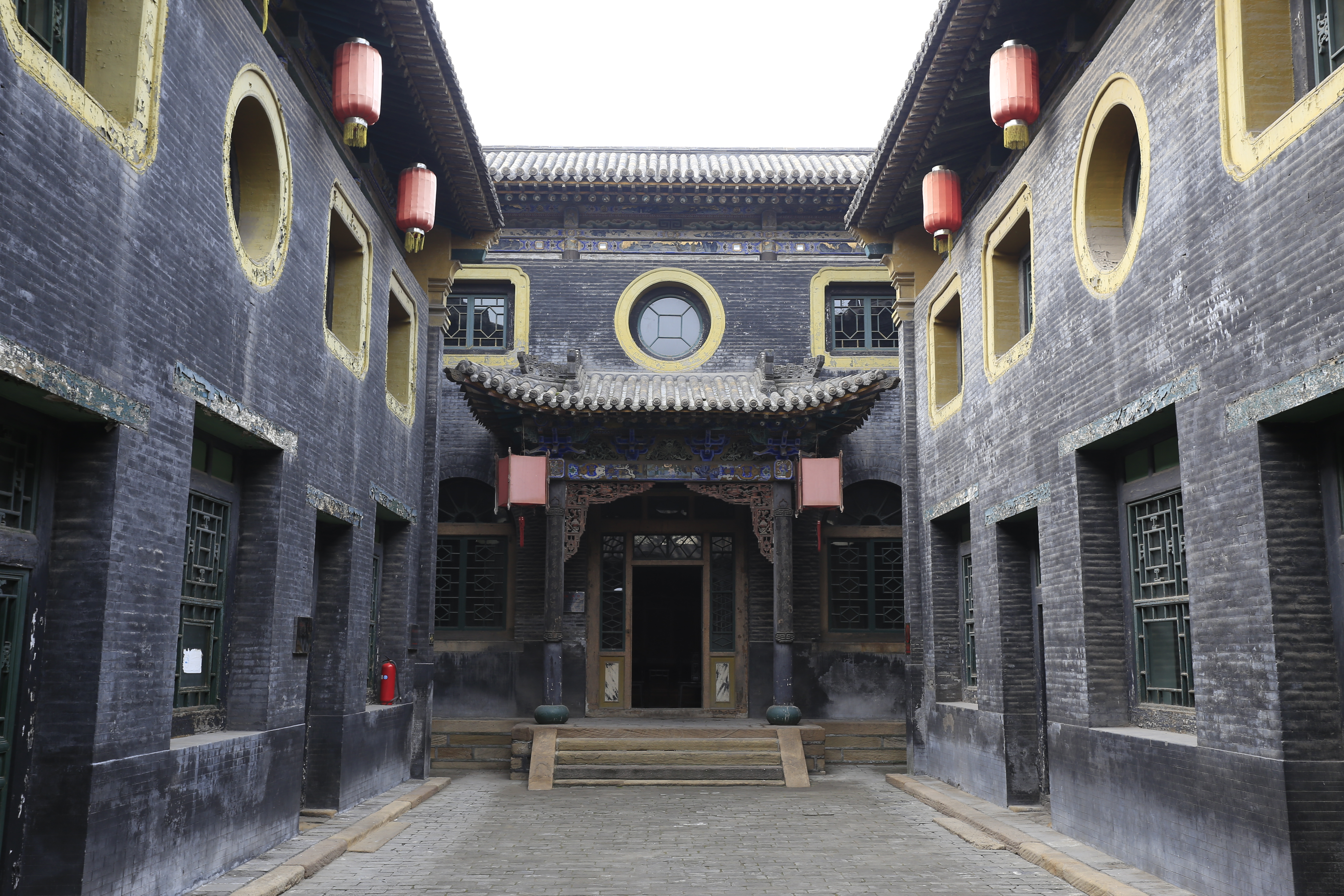
The Kung family residence in Taigu County, Shanxi Province

Kung was born during the late Qing dynasty into a prosperous banking and trading family in Taigu County, Shanxi Province, where he attended a mission school in spite of his family's doubts. He then attended North China Union College in Tongzhou, near Beijing, where he took courses in mathematics, physics and chemistry, subjects which were not offered in traditional Chinese schools. Upon hearing of the Boxer attacks, he returned to Taigu, but his family prevented him from leaving the house. After the Taiyuan Massacre, which included members of the Oberlin Band, he carried letters from several of the murdered missionaries to Beijing by hiding them between the layers of his cloth shoes. Returning to Taigu, by using the powers of the Boxer Indemnity, he distributed relief to the families of those killed, buried the dead, and confiscated the estate of a family which had supported the Boxers.

In the summer of 1901, Luella Miner, a missionary and Oberlin graduate, arranged for Kung to travel to Oberlin for further study. Upon landing in San Francisco, however, because of the Chinese Exclusion Act, Kung and his companion were locked up for several weeks before the Chinese Consul-General posted bond, and they were then not allowed to go to Oberlin for another year. Their railway passage took them into Canada, but only by strong intervention from an Ohio congressman were they allowed to re-enter the United States. Kung graduated from Oberlin in 1906, then proceeded to take a master's degree in chemistry from Yale University.

After completing his education abroad, Kung returned to his home province in China. During the 1911 Xinhai Revolution, Kung mobilized forces in support of Yan Xishan, helping Yan to overthrow the authority of the Qing imperial government in Shanxi. After 1911, Kung became one of Yan's most trusted advisors, and Yan was soon recognized as the military governor of Shanxi by Yuan Shikai, and effectively controlled Shanxi until 1949, when the Communists took control of mainland China. Kung's influence on Yan's thinking from 1911 onward was significant, and was a major factor in Yan's subsequent determination to modernize Shanxi. The reforms that Yan subsequently conducted won Yan widespread acclaim, and Shanxi gained a reputation during the Warlord Era as being the "Model Province".

After 1911, Kung helped to establish Ming Hsien, a complex of Christian schools in Taigu on the land Kung had acquired through the Boxer Indemnity. Kung became principal, and married Han Yu-mei, a fellow graduate of the North China Union College, who died of tuberculosis. In 1913, he met Soong Ai-ling, one of the Soong sisters, and married her the following year. Supporters in Oberlin established the Oberlin Shansi Memorial Association, to which Kung made regular and substantial contributions.

In 1922, Shanxi experienced a serious famine. Kung worked closely with the American Red Cross and missionary organizations like American Mission Board and the China International Famine Relief Commission to deliver relief supplies and to improve Shanxi's infrastructure to make the delivery of relief easier. According to foreign members of the Famine Relief Commission, the collective efforts of all involved were successful in preventing what otherwise would have been an "appalling calamity", and by 1923 conditions in Shanxi returned to normal.

In the summer of 1926 Kung returned to the United States; during this trip he represented China at the Philadelphia Sesquicentennial celebrations, and Oberlin bestowed Kung an LL.D. degree.

=== Minister in the Nationalist government ===
Kung was an early supporter of Sun Yat-sen and the Kuomintang (KMT or Nationalist Party), including early leaders such as Wang Jingwei. He developed close family ties. His wife was a sister of Soong Tse-ven. Soong Ching-ling, another sister, married Sun Yat-sen in 1915 and Chiang Kai-shek became Kung's brother-in-law in 1927 when he married Soong Mei-ling. The Soong sisters and their husbands had the reputation of being one of the Four Big Families of the time.

Kung began his career in the Nationalist government of the Republic of China as Minister of Industry, holding this position from 1927-1928 in the Wuhan Nationalist Government, led by Wang Jingwei during the Northern Expedition as a leftist rival to Chiang's faction. After the fall of Wang's government, Kung served as the Minister of Industry and Commerce from 1928-1931 in the Nanking Government, and later as the Minister of Finance, from 1933–1944. Kung was governor of the Central Bank of China from 1933 to 1945, and also chairman of the China Development Finance Corporation from its creation in 1934.

In 1927 one of his first acts in government was to balance the national budget. To raise the capital required, Kung increased the taxes on cigarettes by 50%. Several Shanghai cigarette factories protested against these taxes with shutdowns. Kung also threatened to increase the salt tax by 28%.

Kung joined the central executive committee of the KMT in 1931. He served as Premier of the Republic of China from 1 January 1938 – 20 November 1939. Kung then served as the Vice-Premier of the Executive Yuan, from 1935-1945. Kung served as China's Chief Delegate to the International Monetary & Financial Conference in 1944, where he signed the Bretton Woods Accord during the Bretton Woods Conference at the Mount Washington Hotel, in New Hampshire, United States. This conference established the International Monetary Fund (IMF) and the International Bank for Reconstruction and Development (IBRD), which today is part of the World Bank Group.

After his move to the central government, Kung continued to advocate for good relations between Chiang Kai-shek and Yan Xishan. Yan's opposition to Chiang during the 1930 Central Plains War caused Yan to formally retire from all positions of leadership in Shanxi, and to flee to Dalian. Kung's tireless advocacy for Yan within the central government was successful, as Chiang allowed Yan to return to Shanxi in 1931. Chiang clearly recognized Yan as the de facto ruler of Shanxi by 1934.

In 1933, Kung spent weeks in Germany, a German business delegation accompanied him back to China, among them Vizeadmiral a. D. Walther Kinzel, who represented Zeiss, Rheinmetall, Krupp and Loewe. In June 1933, Hans von Seeckt published the memorandum to Marshal Chiang Kai-shek on his program to industrialize and militarize China. In 1934, Kung stated, in response to the American "nationalization of silver", that "We also would like to nationalize silver but for China this is impossible because our Government is hampered by extraterritorial treaties. We do not want the price to skyrocket, for silver is vital to our national life."

Kung directed the creation of the fiat currency fabi, which replaced the silver standard in 1935. The fabi experienced from inflation and hyperinflation, and its collapse during Kung's tenure resulted in his legacy as minister of finance being viewed poorly.

=== Diplomacy with Axis powers ===
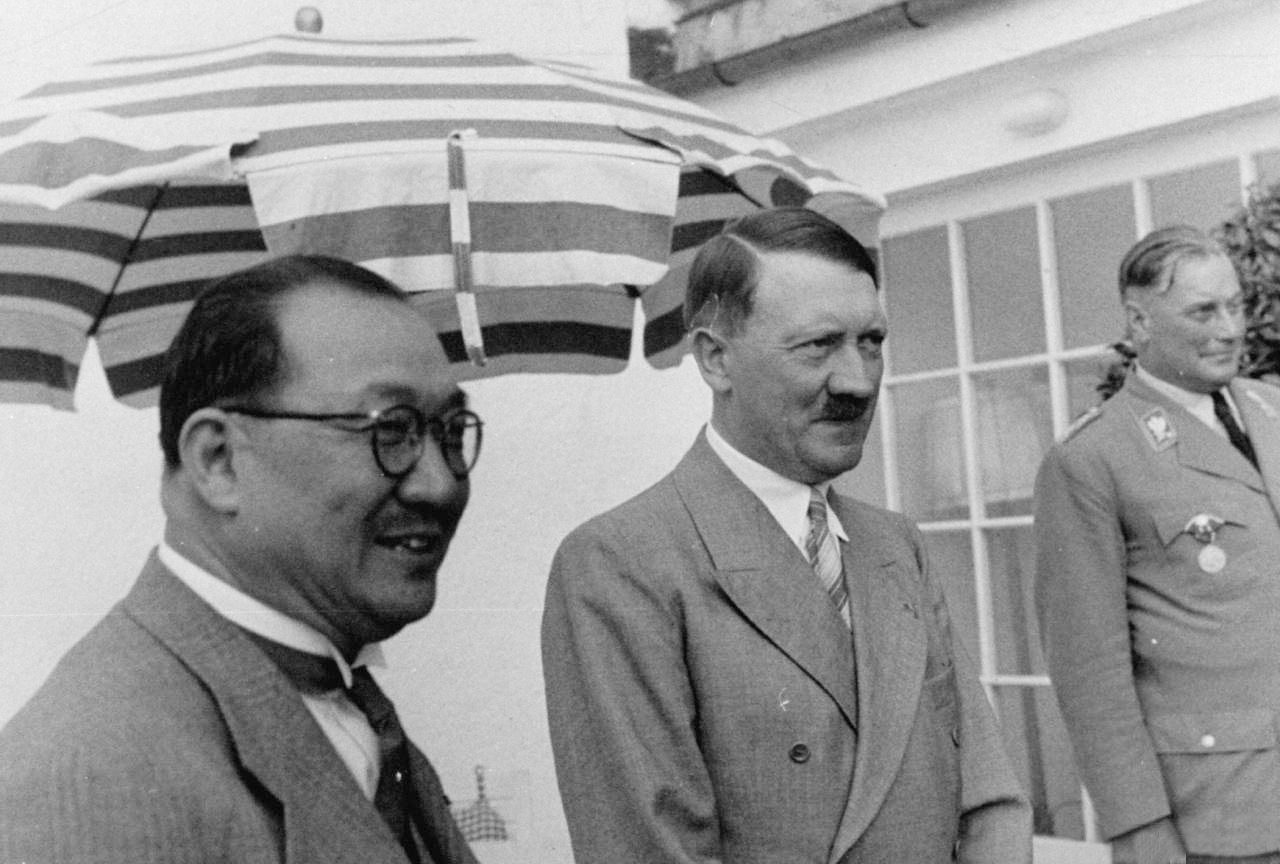
Kung traveled once again to Germany in 1937, attempting to enlist German aid against the Empire of Japan.

In 1937, as the Minister of Finance of the Republic of China, Kung and two other KMT officials visited Germany and were received by Adolf Hitler on 13 June. Hitler told Kung, "I understand that people in China think the Soviet Union is their friend. But from our talk I understand that you, Herr Doktor, realize the danger of Communist doctrines." Kung also convinced Hitler to cancel a scheduled speech at a Nazi conference by Prince Chichibu, the Japanese Emperor's brother. Kung said, "I was able to make Hitler understand that Japan wanted to dominate the world... I was able to make Hitler think twice before getting too close to Japan." While he was in Germany, Kung stated his "deep satisfaction" with Hitler.

Hitler, Hermann Göring and Hjalmar Schacht bestowed upon Kung an honorary degree, and attempted to open China's market to German exports. Hitler, Göring, and Schacht earmarked for Chinese students 100,000 ℛ︁ℳ︁ for studying in Germany after they persuaded an industrialist to set aside the money for that purpose. Kung, in favor of commercial credits, refused an international loan offer by Hitler.

Kung also met Hjalmar Schacht while in Germany. Schacht told him that "German-Chinese friendship stemmed in good part from the hard struggle of both for independence." Kung said, "China considers Germany its best friend... I hope and wish that Germany will participate in supporting the further development of China, the opening up of its sources of raw materials, the upbringing of its industries and [its] means of transportation."

Kung also visited U.S. President Franklin D. Roosevelt and Italian leader Benito Mussolini in 1937. Kung said, "I thought Mussolini was doing great things for Italy... We got along well. I thought he would be a good ally of our Government."

=== During the Second Sino-Japanese War ===
By the time of the Second Sino Japanese War (1937–45), Kung had achieved a reputation as an exceptionally powerful and manipulative figure within the Nationalist government, sometimes in alliance with his brother-in-law, Soong Tse-ven and his sister-in-law, Soong Mei-ling, and sometimes in rivalry with them. By the time the Nationalist government had moved to Chongqing, Kung was running his own secret service. Zhou Enlai, while serving as the Communist Party's ambassador to the KMT in Chongqing, was notably successful in gaining the confidence of Kung's advisor, Hu Egong, allowing Zhou to conduct his intelligence work more efficiently.

In January 1938, Kung, a 75th-generation descendant of Confucius, greeted his relative, Kung Te-cheng, who was also a descendant of Confucius, after Kung Te-cheng had fled to Hankou after the Japanese invasion of Shandong. After Kung Te-cheng fled, the Japanese blew up his residence on Mount Tai. Time magazine addressed Kung Te-cheng by the title "Duke Kung", and referred to his residence as the "ducal seat".

After a string of Japanese mishaps in 1938, Kung gave a radio address in which he stated that "God is helping China!" Kung's radio speech came after reports that a Japanese attempt to seize Hankou had failed, and with constant Chinese guerrilla activity, Chinese forces had recaptured territory previously captured by Japan.

In 1944, Kung gave a speech at China House in New York with one of Mencius's direct descendants, Meng Chih. Both were alumni of American universities.

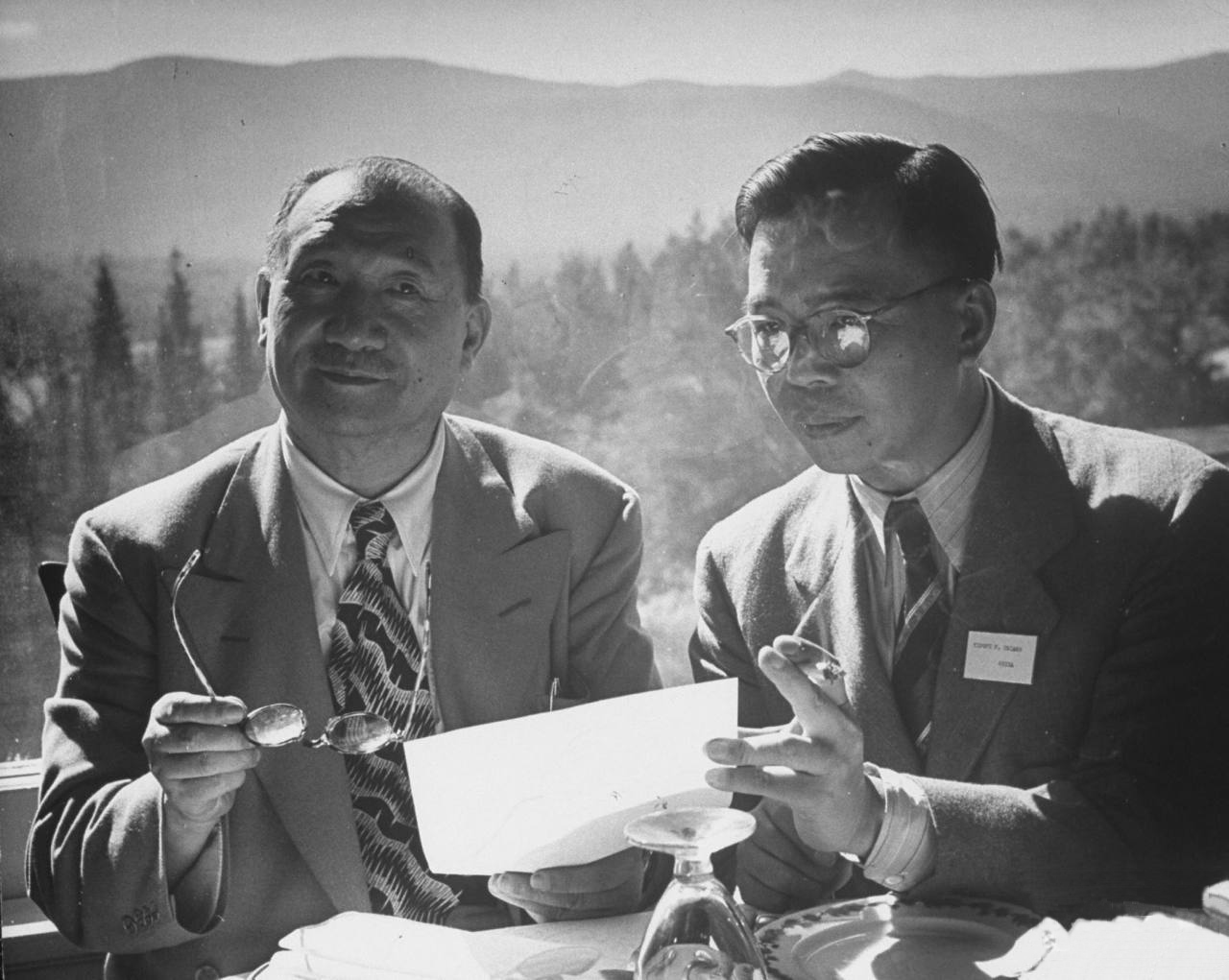
Kung (left) and Tsiang Tingfu at the Bretton Woods Conference, July 1944.

Chiang had lost confidence in Kung by 1944, likely because of widespread reports of corruption by Kung. Kung became unpopular among many different factions of the Kuomintang and was removed from politics. Among other issues, Kung was one of the Nationalist government insiders implicated in corruption during the 1942-1943 American Dollar Bond scandal. After the 1941 Japanese declaration of war against the United States and the United Kingdom, the two allies sought to support China in a concrete way despite logistical limitations following the loss of British Burma. The two countries loaned significant amounts of money to the Nationalist government. The Nationalist government decided to use USD$200 million to absorb excess fabi in an effort to curb inflation. In theory, Chinese purchasers would use fabi to buy bonds at the official exchange rate and be paid in dollars when the bonds were redeemed following victory over Japan. The American Dollar Bonds were issued on 24 March 1942. The public response was poor, with few bond sales. In October 1943, Kung sent a secret memorandum to Chiang Kai-shek asking that the bond sales end. Subscriptions were closed on 15 October 1943, and a central bank official falsely announced that all bonds had been sold. Secretly, insiders then purchased the remaining bonds using currency acquired on the black market. The result was a windfall for Nationalist government insiders including Kung, Long Yun, Wei Daoming, members of the Soong family, and others.

In November 1944, Chiang replaced Kung with Yu Hongjun as the new minister of finance. Kung continued to hold positions as the vice president of the Executive Yuan and head of the Central Bank of China until he was likewise removed from those positions in spring 1945. Chiang nonetheless appointed Kung as the chair of the Central Bank's Board of Directors in an effort to save face. In a further effort to protect Kung, Chiang dismissed lower level finance ministry officials as scapegoats and blocked newspapers from publishing allegations of Kung's corruption in the American Dollar Bond scandal.

Among the KMT factions which criticized Kung in the period leading to his resignation was the Gexin movement.

== Personal life ==
After the KMT retreated to Taiwan in 1949 at the end of the Chinese Civil War, Kung moved to the United States. He died in 1967 in Locust Valley, New York.

Kung had a habit of smoking stogies. Time magazine claimed that Kung smoked "15 Havana cigars" a day. He was a Christian.

Kung was a 75th generation descendant of Confucius, as indicated by the generation name hsiang (祥; xiáng). Kung's father was (孔繁慈; Kǒng Fáncí; K'ung Fan-tsi; 1861–1911), a 74th generation descendant of Confucius, indicated by the generation name fan (繁; fán).

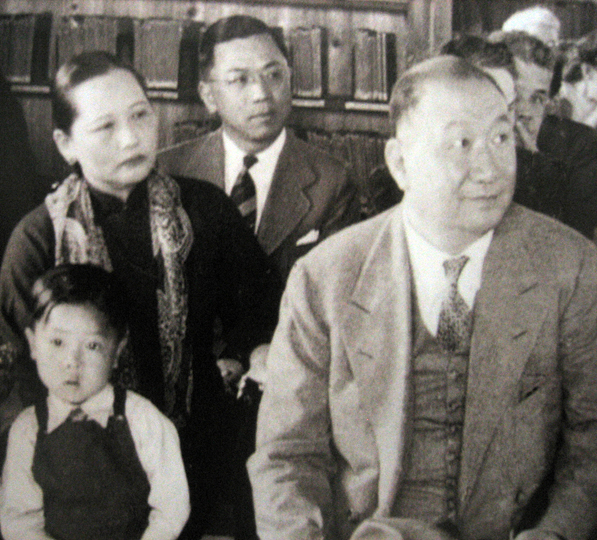
Kung with Soong Ching-ling

Kung first marriage was to Han Yu-mei in 1910, but she died in 1913. In 1914, Kung married his second wife, Soong Ai-ling, the eldest of the Soong sisters. Kung and Soong had two sons and two daughters:

- Kung Ling-i (孔令儀; Kong Lingyi), daughter
- David Kung Ling-kan (孔令侃; Kong Lingkan), son
- Kung Ling-chun (孔令俊; Kong Lingjun), daughter, also known as Kung Ling-wei (孔令偉)
- Kung Ling-chie (孔令傑; Kong Lingjie), son. His grand-son Gregory Kung (Kung Teh-chi) (Kong Deji) (孔德基) was born from his son's marriage to Debra Paget.

The children all have the generation name ling (令; lìng) in their names to indicate that they are 76th generation descendants of Confucius.

The Kung family residential compound, a well-preserved example of mid-Qing dynasty architecture, is now a tourist attraction in Taigu County, Shanxi.

== See also ==
- Soong sisters
- Chiang Kai-shek
- History of the Republic of China
- Military of the Republic of China

== Footnotes ==
Government offices
| Preceded by T.V. Soong | Vice Premier of China; 1933–1938 | Succeeded by Chang Ch'un |
| Preceded by Chiang Kai-shek | Premier of China; 1938–1939 | Succeeded by Chiang Kai-shek |
| Preceded by Chang Ch'ün | Vice Premier of China; 1939–1945 | Succeeded by Weng Wenhao |
