= Music of Veneto =

Music in the Italian region of Veneto

Veneto is one of the 20 regions of Italy. The music of Veneto.

== Venice ==
The city of Venice in Italy has played an important role in the development of the music of Italy. The Venetian state—i.e. the medieval Maritime Republic of Venice—was often popularly called the "Republic of Music", and an anonymous Frenchman of the 17th century is said to have remarked that "In every home, someone is playing a musical instrument or singing. There is music everywhere."

== Venues ==
In Padua, musical ensembles such as the Amici della Musica di Padova, the Solisti Veneti and the Padova-Veneto Symphony are found. Concerts are often held in the historic Loggia Comaro, built in 1524. As well, the city is the site of the Teatro delle Maddalene, the Teatro delle Grazie, the Giuseppe Verdi Theater, and the Cesare Pollini music conservatory.

Rovigo is well known for its love of opera and is the site of the famous Teatro Sociale, built in 1819. In the 20th century it was the venue for the career beginnings of Tullio Serafin, Beniamino Gigli and Renata Tebaldi. The town of Rovigo is also the site of the Francesco Vanezza music conservatory.

The city of Treviso is currently embarked on a music/multimedia facility building project under the umbrella term "Eurobottega". The Teatro Mario Del Monaco is its main theatre and opera house. The town of Asolo in the province has annual chamber music festivals.

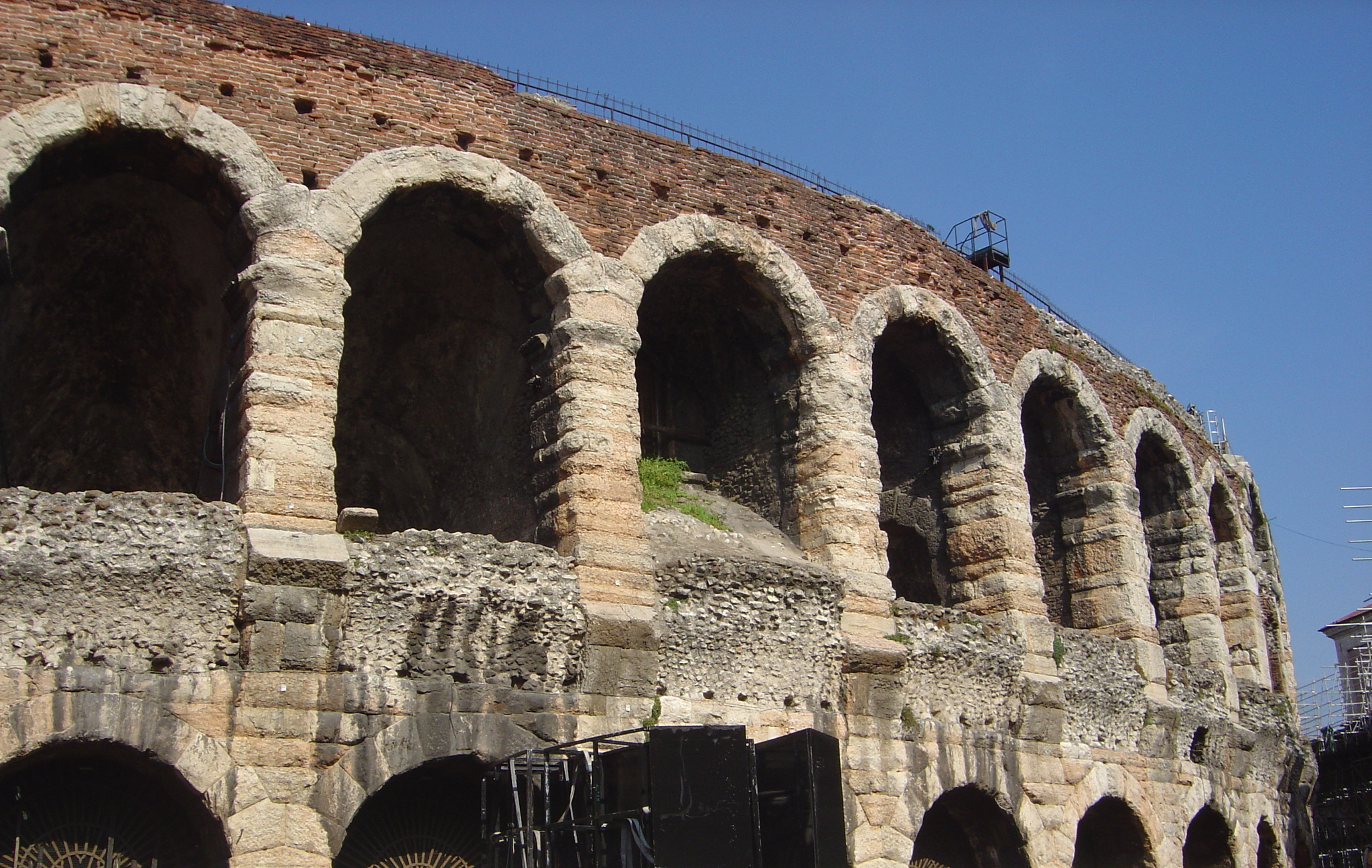
The Arena of Verona.

The city of Verona is world-famous for the Roman amphitheater known as the "Arena", a site that has been hosting musical events since the 16th century, but which is more recently known for the spectacular outdoor staging of Verdi's Aida, an event staged for the first time in 1913. The city also has the Felice Evaristo Dall'Abaco music conservatory;

Vicenza is the site of the Teatro Olimpico and an annual series of symphony concerts, "Il Suono dell'Olimpico" as well as of an interesting project entitled Costruiamo un'opera" aimed at promoting musical education among school children. The town of Bassano del Grappa in the province of Vicenza is the site of OperaEstate Festival Veneto, involving performances at many different locations in the town, virtually turning the entire town into one large operatic venue.

== Folk Music of Veneto ==
Veneto has a rich culture of folk music. Most of the songs that are known today were born between the 18th Century and the first half of 20th Century. The majority of them don't have an author. Venetian chants were mainly choral and they were sung in aggregative moments. After a day of work on the mountain or in the fields (people who used to work in vineyards were forced to sing so the lord or later, the employer, could be sure that they weren't eating the grapes while working); after weddings, at night in an osteria or during filò (country vigils common in the winter). It was during sagre (country festivals) that folk songs flourished the most: the ecclesiastic censorship wasn't respected there, which reflected in more vulgar lyrics with a more liberating effect. Sagre are also the occasions where it's more frequent to hear folk music nowadays.

Like in every oral tradition, a Venetian song can have various versions that can differ in content and in the dialect, which can vary drastically within 30 miles or less. It's also interesting noticing how this repertoire shares similarities and themes with the music of Istria; the song "La mula di Parenzo" (“Parenzo’s mule”), which refers to a Croatian city, is a famous example.

Despite being often sung a cappella, Venetian folk music featured in the past some typical instrument which has felt into disuse before the 20th Century. Between them, the "baga" (a small bagpipe with two pipes) and the piva (bagpipe) (a recorder made of chestnut wood). Nowadays Venetian songs are often accompanied by an accordion or by guitars. The music is generally really simple, diatonic and strophic, often based on tonic to dominant progressions.

Venetian songs often presents a love theme, usually situated in a rustic setting. Sexual themes presented in an irreverent way are common; one example is "L'oselin de la comare".(“The godmather’s little bird”). It's not rare to find dark theme linked in love songs: in "Donna Lombarda" (“Lombard woman”), a man convinces a woman (after getting her drunk) to cheat on her husband and even kill him.

In the capital of Venice and nearby, canzoni da battello (boat songs) were a popular sub-genre. The love theme here is often presented on a gondola, the typical Venetian boat. Famous examples include “La biondina in gondoleta” (“The blonde girl in the gondola”) (Lamberti) and “Monta in gondola” (“Get on the gondola”) (Latilla, Boni); the second one, from the ‘50s, represent a more modern approach which was influenced by the pop music of the days.

Lullabies are really common, the most famous of one would be “Totò totò museta”; they would often include religious thematics.

During World War 1, the repertoire often overlapped with those of the Alpini, the mountain warfare of the Italian Army. Most of these songs were written in the area of Mount Ortigara and they include “Ta pum”, “Sul cappello” (“On our hat”), “Quel mazzolin di fiori” (“That little bunch of flowers”).
