= Jessie Ann Owens =

American author and educator (born 1950)

- Born: March 4, 1950 (age 76)
- Known for: Musicology

Academic background
- Education: Barnard College (BA); Princeton University (MFA, PhD)

Jessie Ann Owens is an American author and educator. She is a professor of music at University of California, Davis and a former dean of the Division of Humanities, Arts and Cultural Studies. Owens is a recognized musicologist of Renaissance music.

== Biography ==
Owens is the daughter of author William A. Owens. She graduated from Kent School in 1967. She received a Bachelor of Arts in Latin from Barnard College in 1971, Master of Fine Arts in Musicology from Princeton University in 1975 and a Ph.D. in Musicology from Princeton University in 1978.

Owens was a professor of musicology at the Eastman School of Music at the University of Rochester in New York from 1980 to 1984 and professor and former dean of arts and sciences at Brandeis University in Massachusetts from 1984 to 1989. She was the Dean, Division of Humanities, Arts and Cultural Studies at the University of California, Davis from 2006 to 2014 and a Distinguished Professor of Music, Emeritus from 2017.

Her music transcriptions have appeared in books and scholarly research. She noted in her book Composers at Work that musical education was "an area badly in need of further investigations." She also studied the role of angels in music. Using paleographical and philological analysis, she also studied the possible relationship between renaissance music composers Cipriano de Rore and Baldissera Donato providing new insights about them.

== Publications ==
- 1983, Tell Me a Story, Sing Me a Song: A Texas Chronicle, provided musical transcriptions (ISBN 978-0-292-78056-9)
- 1996, Composers at Work : the Craft of Musical Composition 1450-1600 (ISBN 0-19-509577-4)
- 2000, Texas Folk Songs, provided musical transcriptions (ISBN 1574411144)
- 2004, "A Collaboration between Cipriano de Rore and Baldissera Donato?" chapter 1 in Historical Musicology: Sources, Methods, Interpretations (ISBN 1-58046-111-5)
- 2011, "'And the angel said ...': Conversations with Angels in Early Modern Music" chapter 10 in Conversations with Angels: Essays Towards a History of Spiritual Communication, 1100-1700 (ISBN 978-0-230-55203-6)
