= Claude V. Palisca =

American musicologist (1921–2001)

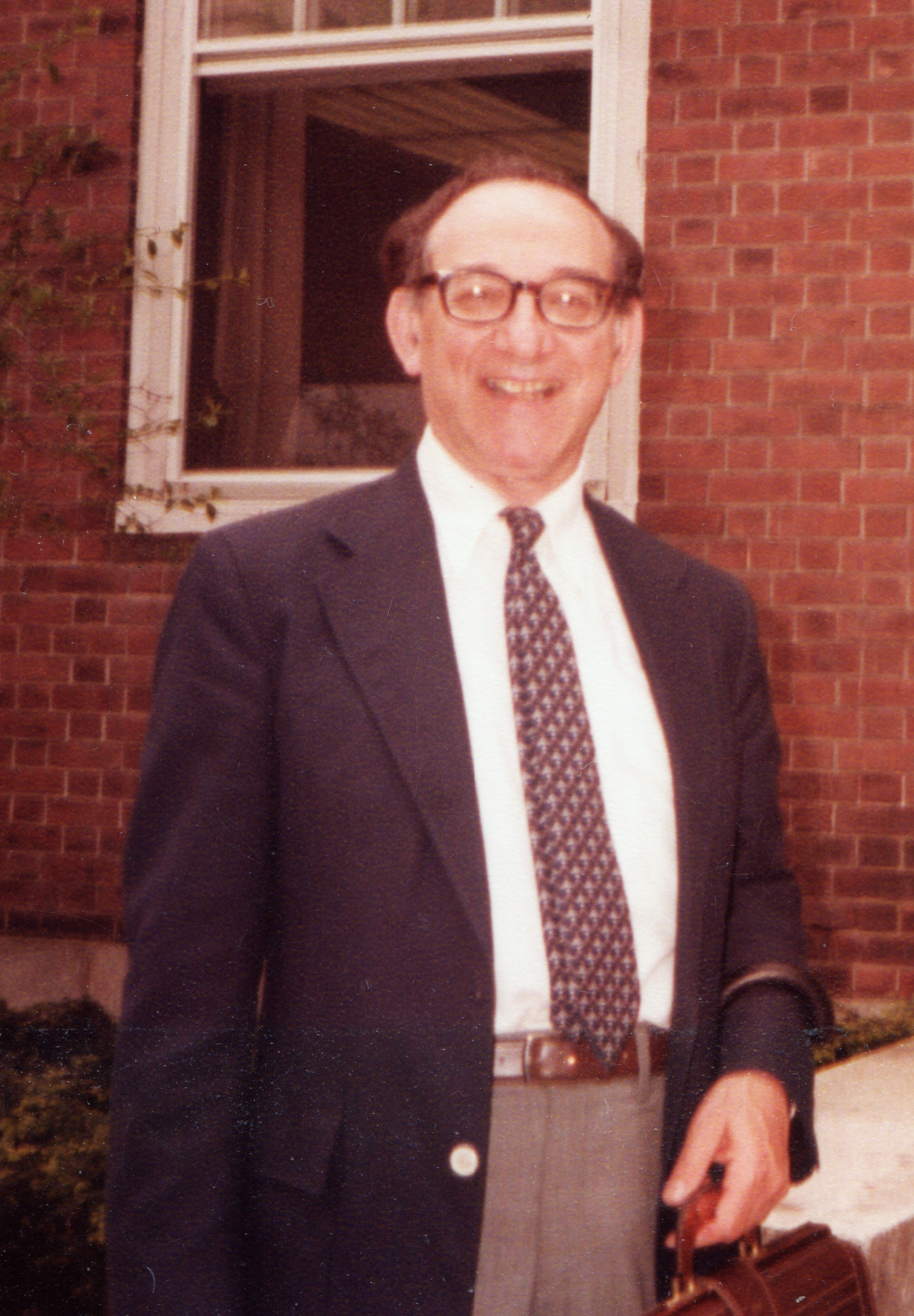

Claude Victor Palisca (24 November 1921 – 11 January 2001) was an American musicologist. An internationally recognized authority on early music, especially opera of the Renaissance and Baroque periods, he was the Henry L. and Lucy G. Moses Professor Emeritus of Music at Yale University. Palisca is best known for co-writing (with Donald Jay Grout) the standard textbook A History of Western Music (3rd–6th editions, 1980–2001), as well as for his substantial body of work on the history of music theory in the Renaissance, reflected in his editorship of the Yale Music Theory in Translation series and in the book Humanism in Italian Renaissance Musical Thought (1985). In particular, he was the leading expert on the Florentine Camerata. His 1968 book Baroque Music in the Prentice Hall history of music series ran to three editions.

== Life and career ==
Palisca was born in Fiume, (in what is now Rijeka, Croatia) in 1921. He studied at Queens College, New York, and Harvard, where he achieved a doctorate in 1954. From 1953 to 1959, he was a professor of music at the University of Illinois, whence he moved to Yale University. From 1969 to 1975 (and again in 1992), he chaired the Faculty of Music at Yale. He lectured throughout the US and Europe and held visiting appointments at the University of Michigan, the University of California, Berkeley, the University of Zagreb and the University of Barcelona. On retirement, he was appointed Henry L. and Lucy G. Moses Professor Emeritus of Music at Yale.

From 1970 to 1972, Palisca was president of the American Musicological Society. In addition to directing the Yale music curriculum, he consulted for the U.S. Office of Education and the National Endowment for the Humanities.

His musicological writings included numerous publications in the academic musical press and a number of books, some co-authored with Donald Jay Grout and others. He edited The Norton Anthology of Western Music: Ancient to Baroque. In 1994, Clarendon Press republished a series of his most-cited papers, stating:

Claude V. Palisca has long been acknowledged as a leading authority on Italian music of the late sixteenth and early seventeenth centuries. These nineteen essays, originally published between 1956 and 1989, draw together a body of significant research into Italian music and music theory, and make readily available papers widely scattered and most now out-of-print. They have further been selected because of their relevance to current research, as evidenced by their continued citation in publications and dissertations.

== Selected bibliography ==
- Baroque Music, Prentice Hall 1968 (1991 3rd ed.) ISBN 0-13-058496-7
- A History of Western Music, W. W. Norton & Co; 7th rev. ed. (10 August 2005) ISBN 0-393-97991-1
- Studies in the History of Italian Music and Music Theory, Clarendon Press, March 1994, ISBN 978-0-19-816167-7
- Aria Types in the Earliest Operas, Palisca's last completed paper for the Journal of 17th Century Music.
- Humanism in Italian Renaissance Musical Thought, Yale University 1985 ISBN 0-300-03302-8
- —— (2001). "Guido of Arezzo [Aretinus]". Grove Music Online. Revised by Dolores Pesce (8th ed.). Oxford University Press. doi:10.1093/gmo/9781561592630.article.11968. ISBN 978-1-56159-263-0. (subscription, Wikilibrary access, or UK public library membership required) (subscription required)
- —— (2001). "Johannes Cotto [Johannes Affligemensis]". Grove Music Online (8th ed.). Oxford University Press. doi:10.1093/gmo/9781561592630.article.14349. ISBN 978-1-56159-263-0. (subscription, Wikilibrary access, or UK public library membership required) (subscription required)
