= Mingxing, Shanxi =

Mingxing
- Town
- 明星镇
- Location in Shanxi
- Coordinates: 37°25′35″N 112°32′39″E
- Country: People's Republic of China
- Province: Shanxi
- Prefecture-level city: Jinzhong
- County: Taigu County
- Village-level divisions: 11 residential communities 9 villages

Area
  - Total: 22 km^{2} (8.5 sq mi)
- Elevation: 792 m (2,598 ft)
- Time zone: UTC+8 (China Standard)
- Postal code: 030800
- Area code: 0354

Mingxing (Chinese: 明星; pinyin: Míngxīng) (formerly Taigu or Taiku) is a town and township-level division and seat of Taigu County, Shanxi, China. It is a seat of a third order administration division. It lies southwest of Jinzhong and comprises nine administrative villages, eleven communities, with a total area of 22 square kilometres (8.5 sq mi). It has a total population of 60,500 people, of which 43,988 are urban dwellers. The language spoken by a majority of inhabitants is Standard Mandarin.

== Landmarks ==
The town is called "Mingxing" which means “Ming Star (Town)” or literally "Bright Star (Town)". There are numerous temples in the city dated to the Ming dynasty, such as the Dacheng Hall of the Temple of Confucius of Taigu. Its Wubian White Tower is also of note.
