= Journal of the American Musicological Society =

- Discipline: Music
- Language: English
- Edited by: Amy Lynn Wlodarski

Publication details
- History: 1948–present
- Publisher: University of California Press on behalf of the American Musicological Society (United States)
- Frequency: Triannually
- Impact factor: 1.1 (2023)

Standard abbreviations
- ISO 4: J. Am. Musicol. Soc.

Indexing
- ISSN: 0003-0139 (print); 1547-3848 (web)
- LCCN: 50012713
- JSTOR: 00030139
- OCLC no.: 470176893

Links
- Journal homepage; Online archive

The Journal of the American Musicological Society is a triannual peer-reviewed academic journal and an official journal of the American Musicological Society. It is published by University of California Press and covers all aspects of musicology. It was established in 1948 and was preceded by the annual Bulletin of the American Musicological Society (1936–1947) and the annual Papers of the American Musicological Society (1936–1941). Online versions of the journal and its predecessors are available at JSTOR and the University of California Press.

In 1948, the initial start-up costs were twice the society's treasury balance at the time, requiring that the society more than double its fees.
