= Last Empress =

Last Empress may refer to:

- Empress Wanrong (1906–1946), empress of Puyi, the last Emperor of China
- The Last Empress (film), 1987 Chinese film starring Pan Hong as Empress Wanrong
- The Last Empress (musical), 1995 musical about Empress Myeongseong of Korea
- The Last Empress (novel), 2007 historical novel by Anchee Min on the Empress Dowager Cixi of China
- The Last Empress: Madame Chiang Kai-shek and the Birth of Modern China, 2009 biography of Soong May-ling
- The Last Empress (TV series), a 2018 South Korean television series
