= Four big families =

Four big families may mean or refer to:

- Four big families of the Republic of China, the four notable families known as (四大家族).
- Four big families of Hong Kong, the four notable families known as (香港四大家族).
