= The Soong Sisters (film) =

1997 Hong Kong film by Mabel Cheung

- DVD cover art

Chinese name
- Traditional Chinese: 宋家皇朝
- Simplified Chinese: 宋家皇朝
Transcriptions
Standard Mandarin
- Hanyu Pinyin: Sòng Jiā Huáng Cháo
Yue: Cantonese
- Jyutping: Sung3 Gaa1 Wong4 Ciu4
- Directed by: Mabel Cheung
- Written by: Alex Law
- Produced by: Raymond Chow; Ng See-yuen
- Starring: Maggie Cheung; Michelle Yeoh; Vivian Wu
- Cinematography: Arthur Wong
- Edited by: Mei Feng
- Music by: Kitarō; Randy Miller
- Production companies: Golden Harvest; More Team
- Distributed by: Golden Harvest; Fuji Television Network; Pony Canyon; Mei Ah Entertainment; Australian Film Commission; More Team International Ltd. Production
- Release date: 21 May 1997
- Running time: 144 minutes
- Country: Hong Kong
- Languages: Cantonese; Mandarin

The Soong Sisters is a 1997 Hong Kong historical drama film based on the lives of the Soong sisters from 1911 to 1949. The three sisters married the most important historical figures – Sun Yat-sen, Chiang Kai-shek and K'ung Hsiang-hsi – in the founding of the Republic of China, making their family the focal point of every major decision made in modern Chinese history. Directed by Mabel Cheung, the film starred Maggie Cheung, Michelle Yeoh and Vivian Wu as the sisters. The screenplay was written by Mabel Cheung's husband, Alex Law, whom she frequently collaborates with.

== Plot ==
The Soong family is a wealthy family who run a successful printing business in China during the final years of the Qing dynasty. The family patriarch, Charlie Soong, sends his three daughters abroad to study at Wesleyan College in Macon, Georgia, United States.

Of the three sisters, the eldest, Soong Ai-ling, is the first to get married in 1914. Her husband is K'ung Hsiang-hsi, a wealthy banker and descendant of Confucius.

Around the same time, Sun Yat-sen is living in exile in Japan after failed attempts to end imperial rule in China. He weds Soong Ching-ling despite strong opposition from Charlie Soong, once his friend and supporter. After the Xinhai Revolution overthrows the Qing dynasty in 1911, Sun Yat-sen becomes the Republic of China's first provisional president and leader of the Kuomintang (Nationalist Party). He dies of liver cancer in 1925 and leaves his wife with his dying wish of reunifying a fragmented China in the wake of the fall of the Qing dynasty.

Chiang Kai-shek succeeds Sun Yat-sen as the leader of the Kuomintang. In 1927, he marries Soong Mei-ling, the youngest of the three sisters. The Chiang couple are at odds with the Communist Party. The widowed Soong Ching-ling often quarrels with the family, accusing Chiang Kai-shek and his followers of persecuting the Communists and hindering the process of Chinese reunification. She leaves the Kuomintang and openly voices dissent against Chiang Kai-shek. The three sisters are never reunited again except at their parents' deathbeds and on a few special occasions.

While the Kuomintang and Communists are fighting with each other, the Empire of Japan takes advantage of the situation to invade China in the 1930s. In 1936, Chiang Kai-shek is kidnapped by Zhang Xueliang in the Xi'an Incident. He is forced to make peace with the Communists and focus on dealing with the Japanese invaders.

After the Second Sino-Japanese War concludes with the Japanese surrender in 1945, the Kuomintang and Communists continue fighting in a civil war, which ends with a Communist victory in late 1949. The Kuomintang, having lost control of Mainland China, relocates the government of the Republic of China to Taiwan. On 1 October 1949, Communist leader Mao Zedong announces the establishment of the People's Republic of China.

== Cast ==
- Maggie Cheung as Soong Ching-ling
- Michelle Yeoh as Soong Ai-ling
- Vivian Wu as Soong Mei-ling
- Winston Chao as Sun Yat-sen
- Wu Hsing-kuo as Chiang Kai-shek
- Jiang Wen as Charlie Soong
- Elaine Jin as Ni Kwei-tseng(Mrs Soong)
- Niu Zhenhua as K'ung Hsiang-hsi
- Liu Jin as Zhang Xueliang

== Production note ==
The film premiered at the Berlin International Film Festival in 1997.

While the focus is on the politics and political figures of the Republic of China, the film is heavily influenced by Chinese politics in the 1990s. Its release in 1997 coincided with the British transfer of sovereignty over Hong Kong to the People's Republic of China. The desire to start relations on favorable grounds may have created some biased screenwriting, even though the perspective will vary depending on the audience. Lines such as "Before we were slaves of Old China. Now we are slaves of slaves of Old China" may have multiple meanings. The film seems to suggest that regardless of past differences and conflicts, there were strong ties that prevailed because of familial love.

Another feature worth noting is the characterisation of historical figures. Sun Yat-sen, Soong Ching-ling and Zhang Xueliang are portrayed as noble individuals while Chiang Kai-shek and Soong Mei-ling are portrayed less favourably. A reason for this may be that filming took place in Beijing, where the Chinese government imposed rules on the portrayal of controversial figures such as Chiang Kai-shek. In fact, director Mabel Cheung has stated that in the 14 minutes that were cut from the final release, there were scenes of romance between Chiang Kai-shek and Soong Mei-ling.

The Soong Sisters presents one interpretation of the 1936 Xi'an Incident as the event was never documented. Other pivotal moments include the founding of the Republic of China in 1911, the Kuomintang's Northern Expedition in 1926–27 against the Beiyang government and other warlords, and the 1931 Mukden Incident which marked the outbreak of the Second Sino-Japanese War.

The film was not released in cinemas in the United States and United Kingdom.

A prop tombstone engraved with the name "Zaha Hadid" can be seen at the beginning, yet the details on it are entirely fictional and do not match the real-life architect.

== Perspective ==
The film has been characterised as having a feminist stance. Apart from the sisters, there were also their three brothers, who were equally prominent in the Republic of China. None from the latter group appear or are mentioned in the film. Scenes of bloodshed were toned down to appeal to a mass audience for educational purposes, and the film avoids describing the violence associated with that era.

Key figures from the Communist Party such as Mao Zedong, Zhu De and Zhou Enlai do not make any appearances in the film, even though historically they played significant roles in the Xi'an Incident. Instead, the Communists are portrayed as a whole entity without any personification. On most accounts, those who support the Communist Party are portrayed as victims at the mercy of Chiang Kai-shek and the Kuomintang.

== Awards and nominations ==
1997 Golden Horse Awards

- Won:
  - Best Art Direction (Eddie Ma)
  - Best Original Score (Kitarō and Randy Miller)
  - Best Sound Effects (Zeng Jingxiang)

1998 Hong Kong Film Awards

- Won:
  - Best Actress (Maggie Cheung)
  - Best Supporting Actor (Jiang Wen)
  - Best Art Direction (Eddie Ma)
  - Best Cinematography (Arthur Wong)
  - Best Original Score (Kitarō and Randy Miller)
  - Best Costume and Makeup Design (Emi Wada)
- Nominations:
  - Best Director (Mabel Cheung)
  - Best Supporting Actress (Michelle Yeoh)
  - Best Supporting Actress (Elaine Jin)
  - Best Screenplay (Alex Law)
  - Best Picture (Ng See-yuen)
  - Best Sound Effects (Zeng Jingxiang)
