= Mausoleum of Soong Ching Ling =

Public cemetery in Shanghai, China

Mausoleum of Soong Ching Ling, Honorary Chairman of the People's Republic of China
- 中华人民共和国名誉主席宋庆龄陵园
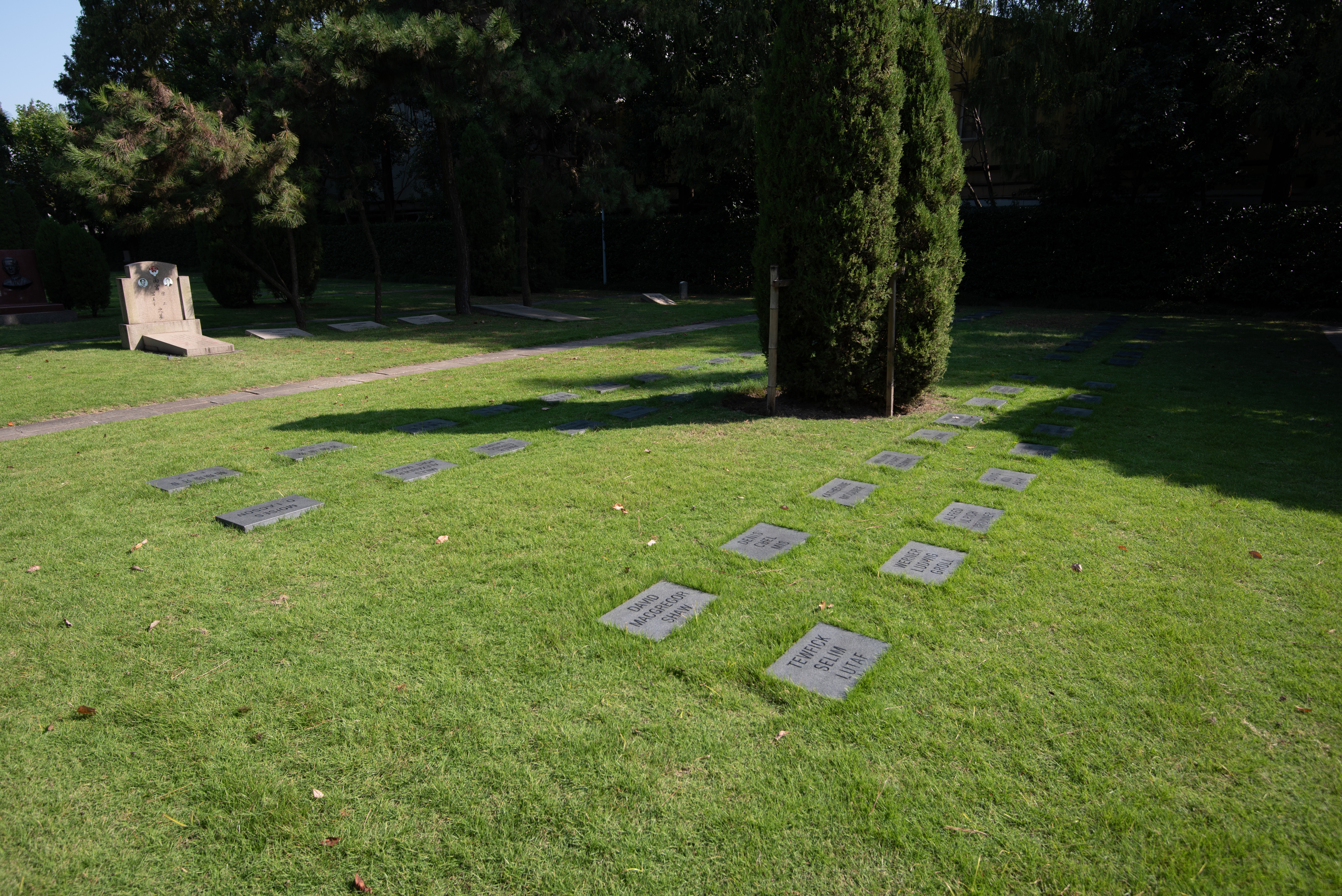
- Foreigners' graveyard
- Interactive map of Mausoleum of Soong Ching Ling, Honorary Chairman of the People's Republic of China

Details
- Established: 1909
- Location: Changning, Shanghai
- Country: China
- Coordinates: 31.197382°N 121.406123°E
- Type: National
- Website: www.shsoongching-ling.com

The Mausoleum of Soong Ching Ling, official the Mausoleum of Soong Ching Ling, Honorary Chairman of the People's Republic of China, is a public cemetery in Shanghai, China. It houses the memorial hall of Soong Ching-ling and her family tombs, along with notable Chinese and foreign figures in Shanghai. The cemetery was called the Shanghai International Cemetery (Shanghai Wanguo Cemetery, 上海万国公墓), before the burial of Soong Ching-ling.

== History ==
In October 1909, Jing Runshan, a businessman from Zhejiang, purchased 20 mu of land in the western suburbs of Shanghai to establish a garden, which was completed in 1914. In 1917, Jing's wife, Wang Guozhen, expanded the garden by an additional 55.6 mu to the west and renamed it the International Cemetery. In September 1934, the cemetery was taken over by the Bureau of Health of the Shanghai Municipal Council, and further expanded into a public cemetery, covering an area of 81,800 square metres (880,000 sq ft).

In 1918, the Soong family bought graveyard within the cemetery as their family graveyard, following the death of Charlie Soong. In August 1931, the Soong sisters and brothers buried their parents together, following the death of their mother Ni Kwei-tseng.

During the Cultural Revolution, the cemetery suffered extensive devastation at the hands of the Red Guards. They desecrated the Soong family tombs at the International Cemetery, toppling gravestones and exhuming the remains of Soong Ching-ling's parents. This deeply shocked and saddened Ching-ling and her family. Chinese Premier Zhou Enlai intervened, ensuring the restoration of her parents' graves.

In 1973, the Civil Affairs Bureau of Shanghai nationalised the 30 mu of land surrounding the Soong family graves. By 1981, the entirety of the International Cemetery had been nationalised.

On 29 May 1981, Soong Ching-ling died in Beijing and was buried in the Soong family graveyard in June. In January 1984, the cemetery was re-organised as the Mausoleum of Soong Ching Ling, Honorary Chairman of the People's Republic of China, which came under state protection in February 1982. Before Soong Mei-ling died in 2003, she had refused to be buried in Taiwan and hoped to be buried with her parents in Shanghai, which was not acceptable for the Kuomintang. As a result, she was buried in the United States instead.

== Notable burials ==
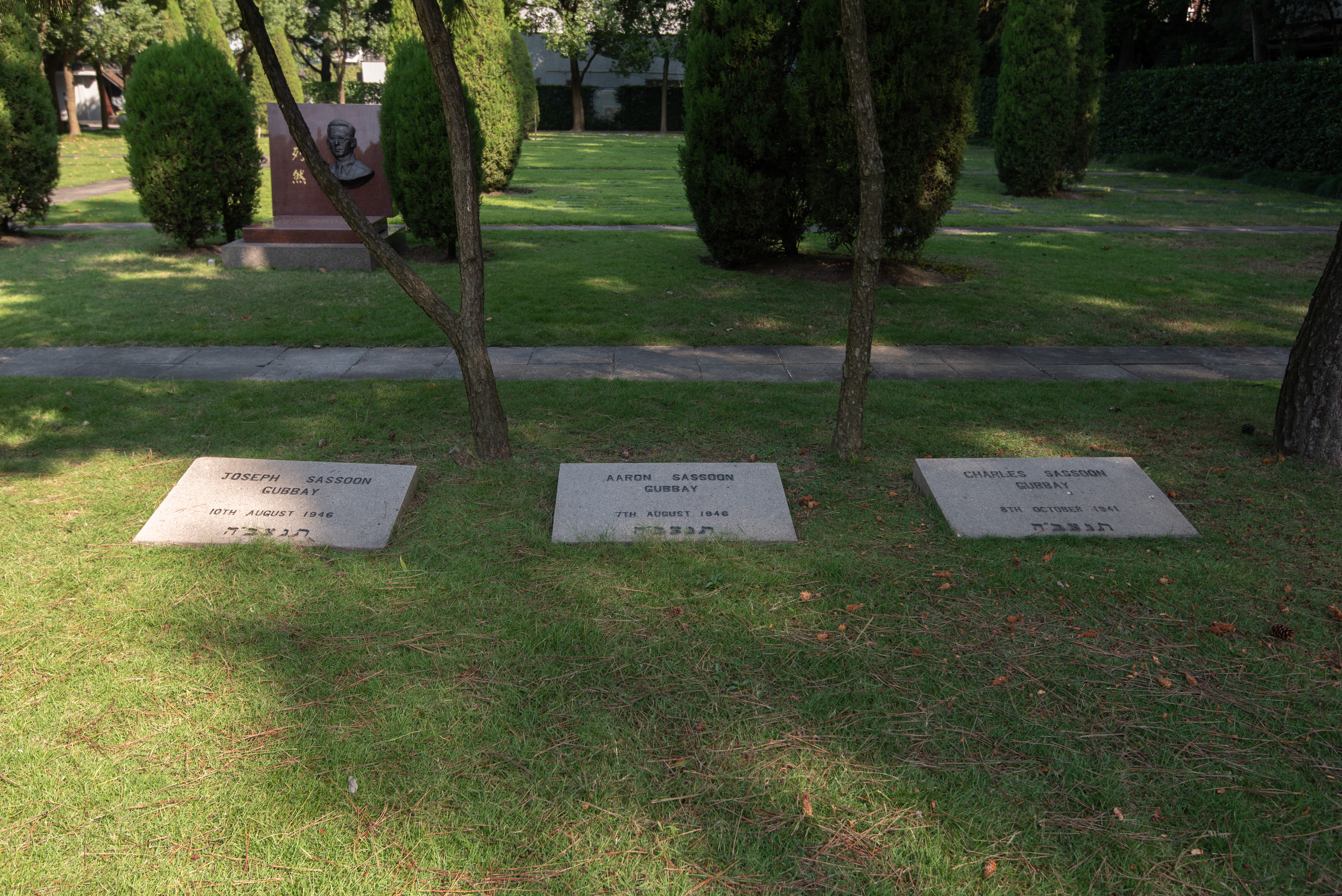
Tombs of the Sassoon family

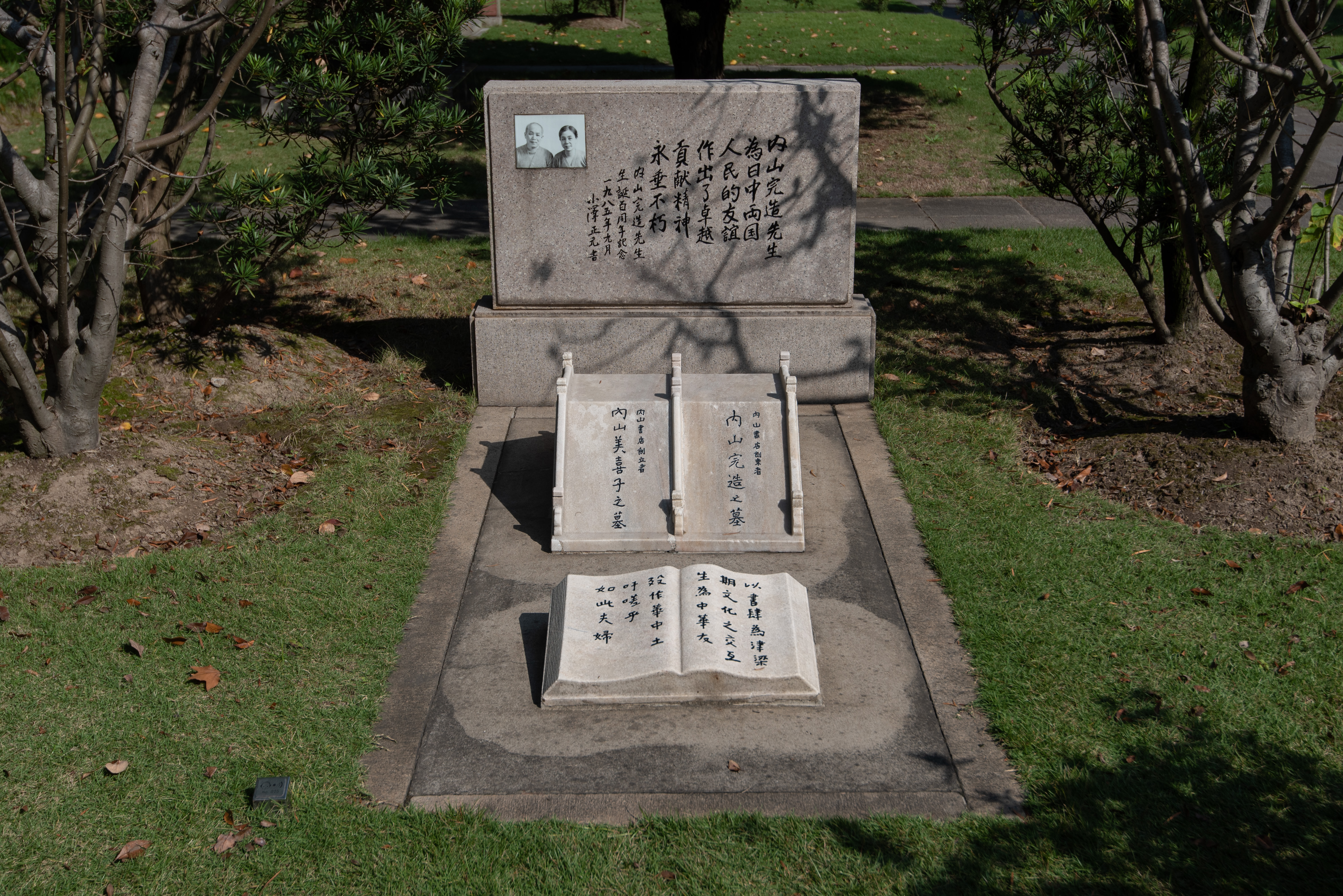
Tomb of Kanzō Uchiyama

In addition to the Soong family, other notable Chinese figures buried in the cemetery includes:

Grave #	Name	Lifespan	Description
1	Jin Zhonghua	1907-1968	Founder of the China News Service; Vice-mayor of Shanghai
2	Yang Xingfo	1889-1933	Chinese social activist who was assassinated by Juntong in 1933
5	Xie Jinyuan	1905-1941	Chinese general who commanded the Defense of Sihang Warehouse
7	Wang Pingnan	1893-1950	Shanghai guerrilla leader
19	Zhang Leping	1910-1992	Chinese cartoonist; author of Sanmao
20	Zhou Xinfang	1895-1975	Beijing Opera performer
21	Ma Xiangbo	1840-1939	Founder of Fudan University
53	Yu Zhenfei	1902-1993	Kunqu performer
73	Yang Du	1874-1931	Chinese political activist
74	Li Zhongshi	1886-1919	Chinese revolutionary

Lu Xun was buried in the cemetery between 1936 and 1956, before moving to Hongkou Park. Kanzō Uchiyama and his wife Inoue Mikiko was also buried in the cemetery. Korean independence leaders, including Park Eunsik, No Baek-rin and Shin Gyu-sik, was once buried in the cemetery before relocated to South Korea.

== Administration ==
The cemetery is managed by the Management Office of the Mausoleum of Soong Ching Ling, Honorary Chairman of the People's Republic of China, which is affiliated with Shanghai Sun Yat-sen and Soong Ching-ling Cultural Relics Management Committee.
