= Polly Gordon =

New York City community activist

Mary Rousmaniere "Polly" Gordon (died 1980) was a community activist in New York City's Yorkville neighborhood. She resided at 10 Gracie Square with her husband, Al Gordon, to whom she was married for fifty years.

Gordon was board chair at the Chapin School from 1965 to 1969. The New York City YWCA's Mary Rousmaniere Gordon award is named in her honor and nearby Carl Schurz Park contains Polly Gordon Walk, which was dedicated in 1984.

Gordon was a 1932 graduate of Vassar College.
