= Kung Ling-i =

Daughter of Kung Hsiang-hsi and Soong Ai-ling

- Born: September 19, 1915; Taigu County, Shanxi, Republic of China
- Died: August 22, 2008 (aged 92); New York City, U.S.
- Parents: Kung Hsiang-hsi; Soong Ai-ling

Kung Ling-i (Chinese: 孔令儀; September 19, 1915 – August 22, 2008), born in Taigu County, Shanxi, was the eldest daughter of Kung Hsiang-hsi and Soong Ai-ling.

== Life ==
Kung Ling-i was born in Taigu, Shanxi Province on September 19, 1915. Kong Ling-i's nickname was "Baby", and her English name was Rosamonde Ling E Kung Hwang. She shared this name with her second aunt Soong Ching Ling.

In 1928, 13-year-old Kong Ling-i went to Nanjing Jinling Girls' High School to study, and lived in the official residence of her uncle Chiang Kai-shek. At the end of the civil war, she moved to New York with her parents.

In 1943, Kung Ling-i went to the United States in the name of studying abroad, and announced her marriage to Chen Jien in the United States. They eventually broke their engagement.

On August 22, 2008, Kong Ling-i died at the age of 92 at her Fifth Avenue apartment in Manhattan, New York, USA. On August 26, the funeral ceremony was held in Manhattan, New York, where she was buried in New York state.
