= Soong sisters =

Powerful siblings in 20th century China

Soong family 宋嘉澍家族
- Chinese political family
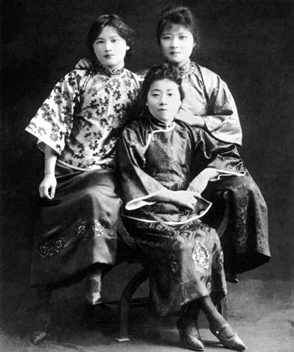
- The Soong sisters
- Country: China
- Current region: Mainly the United States
- Origin: Wenchang, Hainan
- Founder: Charlie Soong
- Connected members: Chiang Kai-shek; H. H. Kung; Sun Yat-sen
- Connected families: Chiang family Kung family Sun family
- Traditions: Methodism

The Soong sisters (Note: Chinese: 宋氏姐妹; pinyin: Sòngshì Jiěmèi) were three prominent women in modern Chinese history. All three sisters, from eldest to youngest, Soong Ai-ling (宋靄齡), Soong Ching-ling (宋慶齡), and Soong Mei-ling (宋美齡), married powerful men, respectively, H. H. Kung, Sun Yat-sen, and Chiang Kai-shek. Along with their husbands, they played major roles in China's politics and foreign relations in the early 20th century.

Of Hakka descent, with ancestral roots in Wenchang, Hainan, the sisters were born to American-educated Methodist minister Charlie Soong, who made a fortune in banking and printing, and Ni Kwei-tseng, also a Methodist who came from an Episcopalian family. The sisters were raised as Christians in Shanghai and educated in the United States, where they all attended Wesleyan College; Mei-ling, however, left Wesleyan and eventually graduated from Wellesley College. Their three brothers were all high-ranking officials in the Republic of China government, one of whom was T. V. Soong.

Their life stories have been summarized in a saying: "One loved money, one loved power, one loved her country", (Note: Chinese: 一個愛錢、一個愛權、一個愛國; pinyin: Yīgè ài qián, yīgè ài quán, yīgè ài guó) referring to Ai-ling, Mei-ling, and Ching-ling in that order.

== History ==
=== Early life ===
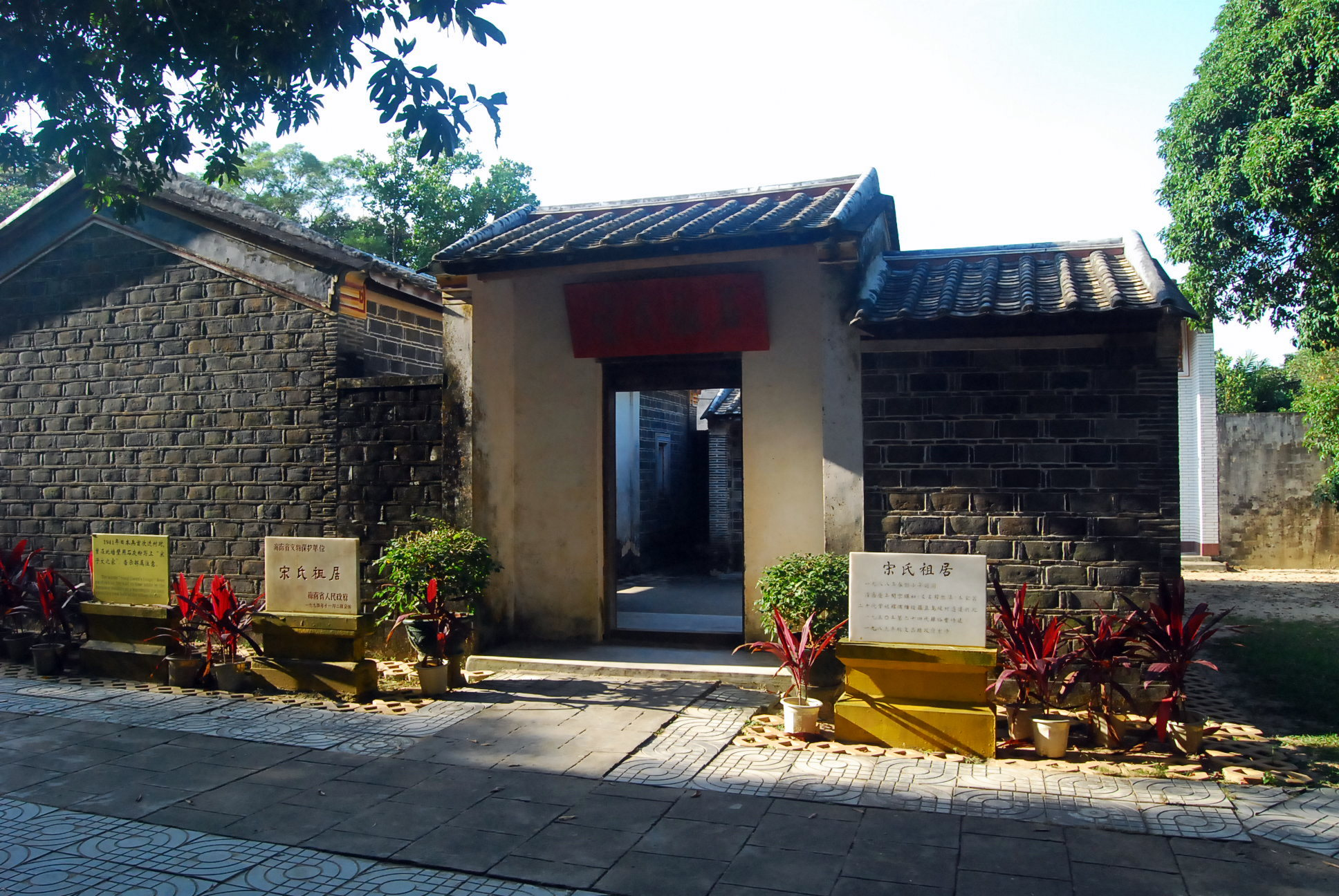
Ancestral home of the Soong family in Wenchang, Hainan

Charlie Soong, the father of the Soong sisters, was born in Wenchang, Hainan, in 1866, with the birth name Han Chiao Shun. He initially traveled to Java with his brother before being adopted by his uncle, who took them to Boston, United States, where Charlie worked as a shop assistant. His name was misunderstood by Americans as Charlie Soon and later became Charlie Soong.

In Boston, Charlie met New Shan-chow and Wen Bingzhong, frequent visitors to the shop, who encouraged him to pursue further education. In 1879, he fled the store and boarded the USS Albert Gallatin of the United States Revenue Cutter Service, where he was adopted by Captain Eric Gabrielson. Charlie became a Christian in Wilmington in 1880, becoming the first baptised Chinese person in North Carolina. With the support of a local church, he studied at Trinity College and later Vanderbilt University.

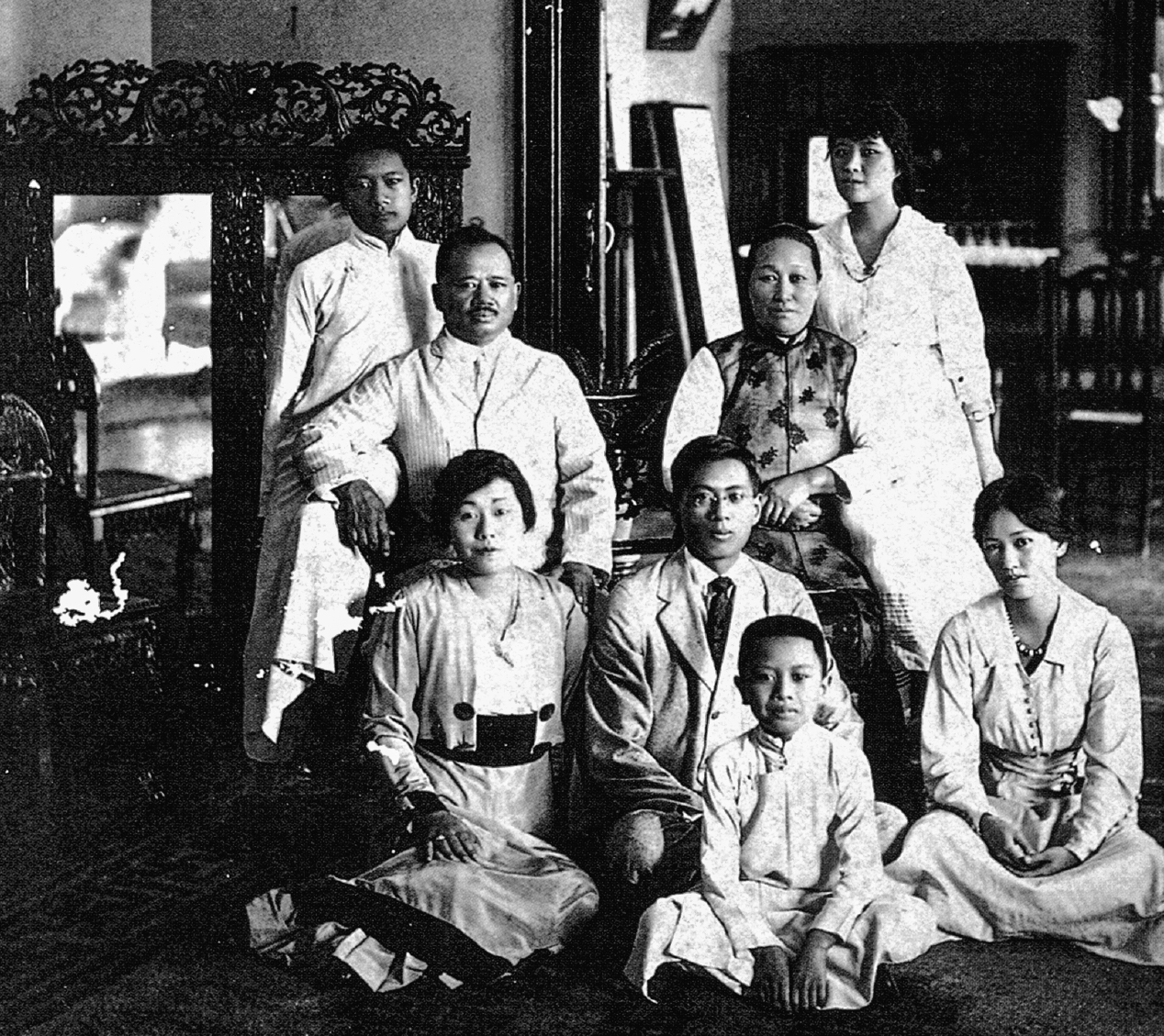
The Soong family in 1917

He returned to China as a missionary in 1885 and later married Ni Kwei-tseng, a match arranged by Wen Bing-chung. The couple initially engaged in missionary work and business in Kunshan, later continuing their missionary efforts in Chuansha. Their first daughter, Ai-ling, was born on 15 July 1889 in Kunshan, followed by two more daughters, Ching-ling and Mei-ling, as well as three sons, Tse-ven (T. V.), Tse-liang (T. L.) and Tse-an (T. A.). Charlie resigned from the mission in 1892, due to insufficient fund to support his family and became a successful businessperson for printing the Bible.

=== Education ===
Charlie was deeply committed to education in the United States for his daughters. He wanted them to receive a Methodist education, so he enrolled them at McTyeire School for Girls in Shanghai, where Ching-ling studied from 1904 to 1907. Acting on the advice of his missionary friend William Burke, who had ties to the Mulberry Street United Methodist Church in Macon, Charlie sent his eldest daughter Ai-ling to Wesleyan College in 1904.

Ching-ling and Mei-ling were among the first government-funded female Chinese students to study in the United States. The group, consisting of ten male and four female students, departed from Shanghai on 1 August 1907 and arrived in Seattle on 28 August, under the escort of Wen Bingzhong, the director of the Foreign Office of the Viceroy of Liangjiang. Ching-ling first attended school in Summit, New Jersey, to study Latin and French to fulfil Wesleyan's entrance requirements. She joined Ai-ling as a full-time college student at Wesleyan in the autumn of 1908, with their youngest sister Mei-ling accompanying them despite being only ten years old.

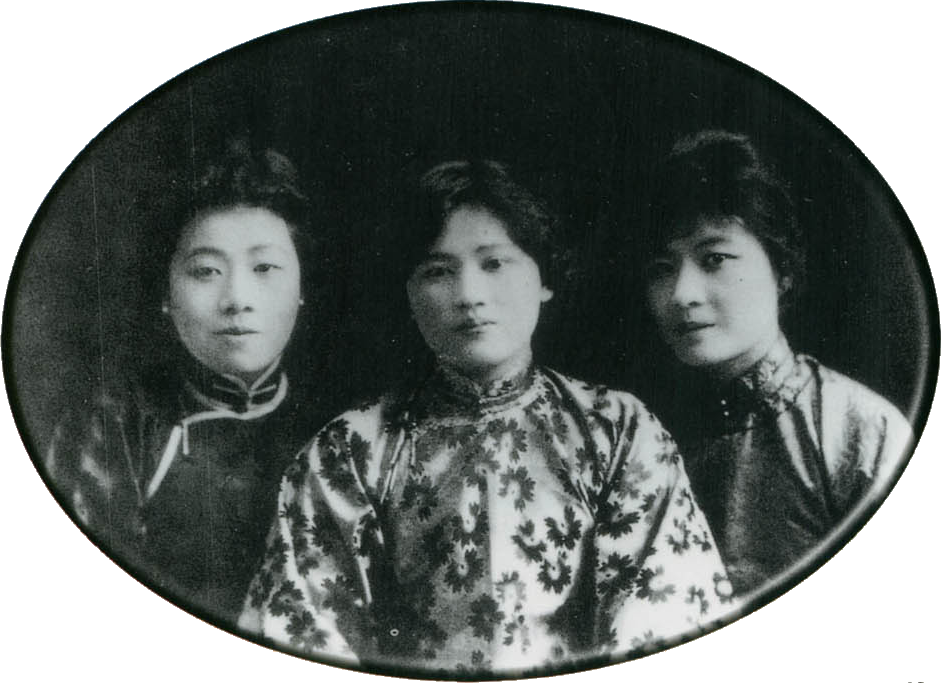

Although the Soong sisters spent most of their time on campus, they also travelled across the United States, navigating the prevailing anti-Chinese sentiments of the time. They were warmly received by local communities in the American South. In the summer of 1910, Ching-ling and Mei-ling attended summer school together at Fairmount College. In the summer of 1912, they participated in a church-sponsored YMCA conference in Montreat, North Carolina. During several Christmas holidays, they visited Washington, D.C., where they were hosted as guests of the Chinese ambassador.

=== Marriage ===
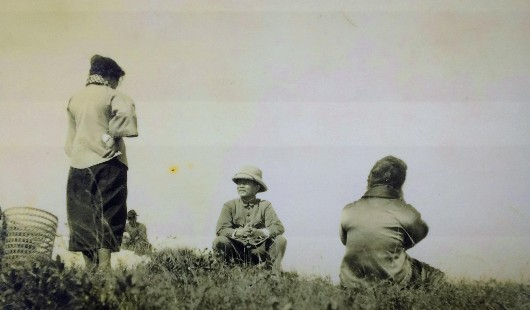
Soong Ching-ling, Soong Mei-ling and Sun Yat-sen in Guangzhou

After graduating, Ching-ling's elder sister, Ai-ling, returned to Shanghai in 1908 and became the secretary to Sun Yat-sen. Sun became fascinated with Ai-ling, constantly gazing at her, although Ai-ling did not reciprocate his feelings in the same way. Ching-ling graduated from Wesleyan in 1913, and returned to China via Yokohama, Japan, where she met Sun. Ai-ling resigned in 1914 to marry H. H. Kung, passing the position on to Ching-ling, who admired Sun as the hero who founded the Chinese Republic. In the summer of 1915, Ching-ling returned to Shanghai, asking her parents for their permission to marry Sun, which shocked the family. Ching-ling was confined at home in Shanghai, during which Sun divorced with his wife Lu Mu-zhen.

Despite objections from her father, Ching-ling married Sun Yat-sen on 25 October 1915. There were limited witnesses in their wedding ceremony in Tokyo, which included Wada Mizu, who provided his home for the wedding, Liao Zhong-kai and Liao's 11-year-old daughter Cynthia. The Soong family chased Ching-ling to Tokyo, attempting to dissuade her from the marriage, with her father Charlie even appealing to the Japanese government to denounce Sun. Additionally, many of Sun’s colleagues did not acknowledge Ching-ling as his wife, referring to her as Miss Soong rather than Mrs Sun.

During a visit to Sun's residence in Shanghai, Chiang Kai-shek encountered Ching-ling's younger sister, Mei-ling, for the first time and became enamoured with her. Subsequently, Chiang divorced his wife in Fenghua and sought Sun's counsel on pursuing Mei-ling. When Sun consulted Ching-ling on the matter, she expressed her strong disapproval. Sun then advised Chiang to wait, and Chiang obeyed. In 1927, Mei-ling married Chiang, who was about to launch a purge against the CCP. Ching-ling protested and left China after the purge.

=== Reunion in the war ===
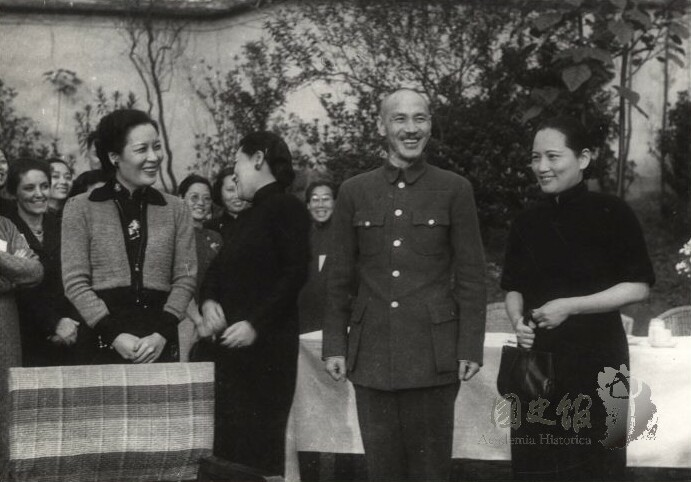
The Soong sisters with Chiang Kai-shek in Chongqing

In 1937, when the Second Sino-Japanese War broke out, all three of them got together after a 10-year separation in an effort to unite the Kuomintang and Communists against the Imperial Japanese army. Soong Ai-ling devoted herself to social work such as helping wounded soldiers, refugees and orphans. She donated five ambulances and 37 trucks to the army in Shanghai and the air force, along with 500 leather uniforms. When the Japanese occupied Nanjing and Wuhan, the three sisters moved to Hong Kong. In 1940, they returned to Chongqing and established the Chinese Industrial Cooperatives, which opened job opportunities for people through weaving, sewing and other crafts. The sisters frequently visited schools, hospitals, orphanages, air raid shelters and aided war torn communities along the way.

=== Break-up and deaths ===
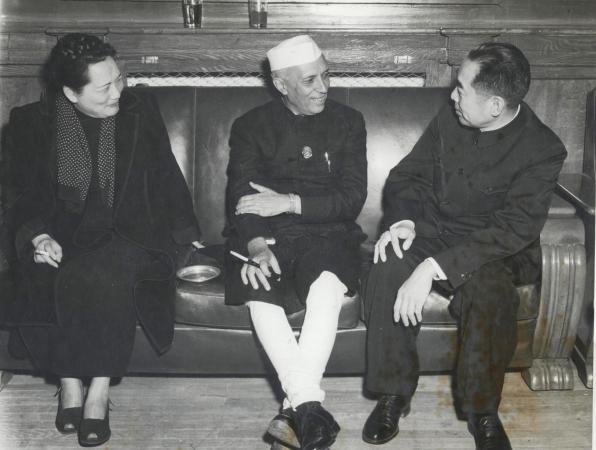
Soong Ching-ling meeting Nehru with Zhou Enlai in Beijing, 1954

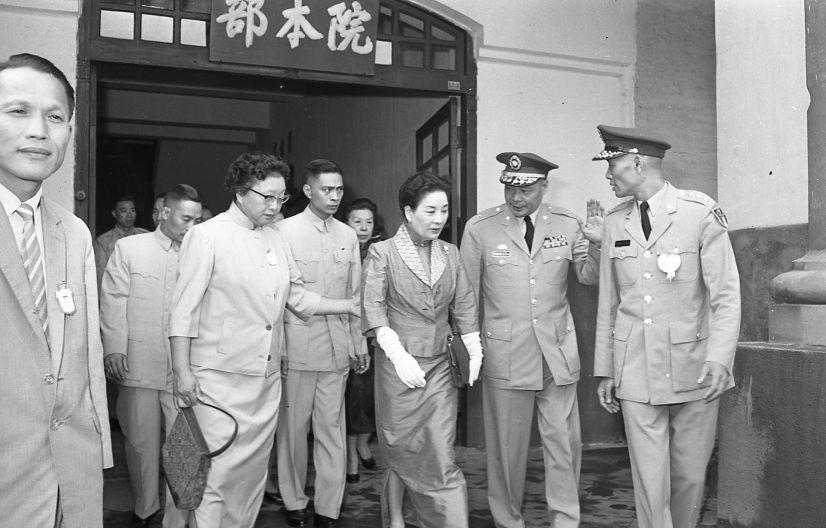
Soong Mei-ling visited American soldiers in Taiwan, 1964

In 1944, Ai-ling left China for Brazil to receive medical treatment and later settled in the United States in 1946. In November 1948, Mei-ling travelled to the United States to seek support for her husband, Chiang Kai-shek, and the Kuomintang. In May 1949, she wrote to Ching-ling, asking if there was anything she could do for her sister in China. This letter marked the last communication between Mei-ling and Ching-ling. Following the Kuomintang's defeat in the Chinese Civil War, Mei-ling arrived in Taipei, Taiwan, in 1950, while Ching-ling remained on the mainland and joined the Communist-led government. In 1957, Ching-ling wrote to Ai-ling, requesting her to return to China.

In 1969, Ai-ling and Mei-ling attended the funeral of their brother T. A. Soong in San Francisco, but Ching-ling was absent. In 1971, T. V. Soong died in San Francisco, and his funeral was scheduled to take place in New York. Mei-ling flew from Taiwan to Hawaii for a stopover, during which Chiang Kai-shek urged her to cancel her trip. She later learned that the Communist Chinese government had informed the U.S. government of Ching-ling’s intention to attend the funeral in New York. Consequently, Mei-ling and Ai-ling both cancelled their trips, and none of the sisters attended their brother's funeral. Ai-ling died in New York in 1973. Ching-ling had planned to reunite with Mei-ling in Japan before her death, which never happened.

In 1981, Ching-ling fell critically ill. Her help sent a telegram to Mei-ling, hoping for a reunion. Mei-ling responded, suggesting that Ching-ling be sent to New York, where she lived, as a potential family reunion in Beijing was seen as a threat to the legitimacy of her stepson, Taiwanese President Chiang Ching-kuo. Xinhua noted that although other Soong family members were present at the time of Ching-ling's passing, Mei-ling was not. Beijing later invited Mei-ling to the funeral, but she told Chiang Ching-kuo, her stepson, that she would not go. Deng Xiaoping mentioned that Ching-ling had expressed hope for reunification talks between the governments of Beijing and Taipei in the near future.

Ching-ling was buried in the Soong family graveyard in June 1981. In January 1984, the cemetery was revamped as the Soong Ching-ling Mausoleum, which came under state protection in February 1982. Before Mei-ling died in 2003, she had refused to be buried in Taiwan and hoped to be buried with her parents in Shanghai, which was not acceptable for the Kuomintang. As a result, she was buried in the United States instead.

== Family members ==
=== Three sisters ===
Name	Portrait	Life span		Resting place	Description
Name	Portrait	From	To	Resting place	Description
Soong Ai-ling		15 July 1889	20 October 1973	Ferncliff Cemetery and Mausoleum	Soong Ai-ling (Note: Chinese: 宋蔼龄; pinyin: Sòng Ǎilíng) (1890–1973) was a Chinese socialite and political figure. She married H. H. Kung, a prominent financier and government official. After the Chinese Civil War, she moved to the United States, where she became involved in philanthropy and maintained ties with the Kuomintang. Ai-ling was noted for her wealth, remaining a significant figure in the Chinese diaspora until her death in 1973.
Soong Ching-ling		27 January 1893	29 May 1981	Soong Ching-ling Mausoleum	Soong Ching-ling (Note: Chinese: 宋庆龄; pinyin: Sòng Qìnglíng) (1893–1981) was a Chinese political leader and the wife of Sun Yat-sen, the founding father of the Republic of China. After Sun's death, she was initially aligned with the Kuomintang, and later supported the Chinese Communist Party, advocating for the Chinese Communist Revolution and national unity. Soong played a key role in promoting social welfare and women's rights. After the Chinese Civil War, she remained in mainland China. She was made Honorary President of the People's Republic of China shortly before her death in 1981.
Soong Mei-ling		4 March 1898	23 October 2003	Ferncliff Cemetery and Mausoleum	Soong Mei-ling (Note: Chinese: 宋美龄; pinyin: Sòng Měilíng) (1898–2003) was a Chinese political figure and the wife of Chiang Kai-shek. As First Lady of the Republic of China, she garnered support for China from Western nations during the Second Sino-Japanese War, and often acted as a spokesperson for her husband's government on the international stage. After the Kuomintang's defeat in the Chinese Civil War, Mei-ling moved to Taiwan with Chiang. Her political influence waned after her husband's death in 1975, and she subsequently relocated to New York, where she remained until her death.

=== Parents ===
Name	Portrait	Relation	Life span		Resting place	Description
Name	Portrait	Relation	From	To	Resting place	Description
Charlie Soong		Father	17 October 1861	3 May 1918	Shanghai International Cemetery (renamed as Soong Ching-ling Mausoleum)	Charlie Soong (1866–1918) was a prominent Chinese businessman, missionary, and political figure. He played a key role in funding the revolutionary activities of Sun Yat-sen, contributing to the overthrow of the Qing Dynasty and the establishment of the Republic of China.
Ni Kwei-tseng		Mother	22 June 1869	23 July 1931	Shanghai International Cemetery (renamed as Soong Ching-ling Mausoleum)	Ni Kwei-tseng (1869–1931) was a prominent Chinese matriarch best known as the wife of Charlie Soong and the mother of the influential Soong sisters: Soong Ai-ling, Soong Ching-ling, and Soong Mei-ling. Her daughters played pivotal roles in 20th-century Chinese history.

=== Brothers ===
Name	Portrait	Relation	Life span		Resting place	Description
Name	Portrait	Relation	From	To	Resting place	Description
T. V. Soong		Brother	4 December 1894	25 April 1971	Ferncliff Cemetery and Mausoleum	T. V. Soong, a prominent Chinese politician and financier. He played a pivotal role in stabilising the economy and securing foreign aid during the Second Sino-Japanese War. Known for his negotiation skills, he established strong ties with international powers, particularly the United States, which bolstered China's wartime efforts. Despite his achievements, he was also criticised for the perception of wealth accumulation by the Soong family, a narrative that became part of China's political discourse.
T. L. Soong		Brother	27 March 1899	11 May 1987	Ferncliff Cemetery and Mausoleum	T. L. Soong is known for his role as a Chinese diplomat and for his work in fostering international relations during the Second Sino-Japanese War.
T. A. Soong		Brother	27 April 1906	25 February 1969	Mountain View Cemetery	T. A. Soong, a lesser-known member of the influential Soong family, was primarily involved in the banking and financial sector.

=== Spouses ===
Name	Portrait	Spouse	Life span		Resting place	Description
Name	Portrait	Spouse	From	To	Resting place	Description
H.H. Kung		Soong Ai-ling	11 September 1880	16 August 1967	Ferncliff Cemetery and Mausoleum	H. H. Kung (Kung Hsiang-hsi) was a prominent Chinese businessman, politician, and banker. A descendant of Confucius, Kung married Soong Ai-ling. He served as China's Minister of Finance, Minister of Industry, and Vice Premier under the Nationalist government led by Chiang Kai-shek.
Sun Yat-sen		Soong Ching-ling	12 November 1866	12 March 1925	Sun Yat-sen Mausoleum	Sun Yat-sen (1866–1925) was a revolutionary leader and statesman known as the "Father of Modern China." He played a pivotal role in overthrowing the Qing Dynasty and establishing the Republic of China in 1912. Sun was the founder of the Kuomintang and a key proponent of the "Three Principles of the People".
Chiang Kai-shek		Soong Mei-ling	31 October 1887	5 April 1975	Mausoleum of Late President Chiang	Chiang Kai-shek (1887–1975) was a Chinese military and political leader who headed the Kuomintang and led the Nationalist government in the early 20th century. After Sun Yat-sen's death in 1925, he led China during the Second Sino-Japanese War. Following World War II, Chiang's government clashed with the Chinese Communist Party, leading to the Chinese Civil War. After defeat, he retreated to Taiwan in 1949, where he continued to claim legitimacy as China's leader, imposing martial law and maintaining an authoritarian regime until his death in 1975.

== Cultural materials ==
- The Soong Sisters, the award-winning 1997 Hong Kong film depicting the lives of the sisters
- The Soong Sisters, a 1941 book by Emily Hahn
- The Soong Dynasty, a 1985 book by Sterling Seagrave, ISBN 978-0-283-99238-4
- Big Sister, Little Sister, Red Sister, a 2019 book by Jung Chang, ISBN 9781910702796

== See also ==
- Four big families of the Republic of China
- History of the Republic of China
- Kuomintang

== Bibliography ==
- Hahn, Emily (1941). The Soong Sisters. Reprinted in 2014 by Open Road Integrated Media, Inc. (e-book ed.). New York, NY: Doubleday, Doran & Co. ISBN 978-1-4976-1953-1.
- Seagrave, Sterling (1985). The Soong Dynasty. London, England: Corgi Books. ISBN 0-552-14108-9.
- Zhang, Rong (2019). Big sister, little sister, red sister: three women at the heart of twentieth-century China. New York: Alfred A. Knopf. ISBN 978-0-451-49351-4.
