= David Kung Ling-kan =

Son of Song Ailing

- 孔令侃
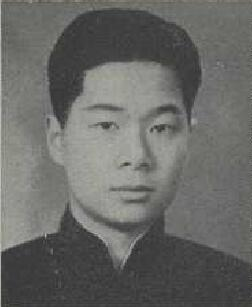
- David Kung Ling-kan, 1936
- Born: 10 December 1916; Shanghai, Republic of China
- Died: 1 August 1992 (aged 75); New York City, United States
- Burial place: Ferncliff Cemetery
- Education: St. John's University, Shanghai (BS); Harvard University (MA)
- Occupation: Businessperson
- Political party: Kuomintang
- Spouse: Bai Lanhua (白兰花)
- Parent(s): H. H. Kung; Soong Ai-ling

David Kung Ling-kan
- Chinese: 孔令侃
Transcriptions
Standard Mandarin
- Hanyu Pinyin: Kǒng Lìngkǎn
- Wade–Giles: K'ung3 Ling4-kan3

David Kung Ling-kan (Chinese: 孔令侃, 10 December 1916 – 1 August 1992) was the eldest son of H. H. Kung and Soong Ai-ling. Kung was a 76th generation descendant of Confucius, being given the generation name "ling".

For a period he had the English name "David", but later stopped using it, even while speaking in English and living in the United States.

== Life ==
In 1933, Kung Ling-kan studied at St. John's University in Shanghai. After graduating from college in 1936, he served as the Secret Secretary of the Ministry of Finance and then entered the newly established Central Trust. After the Japanese occupation of Shanghai in 1937, the Central Trust Bureau was withdrawn to Hong Kong, and Kung served as executive director and presided over the business.

In 1939, the British Hong Kong authorities seized the secret radio station and expelled it from Hong Kong. Subsequently, Kung Ling-kan went to Harvard University to study in the United States, and married Man Shengli's ex-wife on the way to Manila.

In 1943, his aunt Soong Mei-ling went to the United States to visit, and Kung Ling-kan served as secretary. After the end of the Anti-Japanese War, Kung returned to Shanghai to establish Yangzi Jianye Co., Ltd.

In 1948, in the late period of the civil war between the Kuomintang and the Chinese Communist Party, China experienced severe hyperinflation. The government decided to release a new currency, the gold yuan.

Chiang Ching-kuo went to Shanghai to supervise the economic control. The iron fist method was used to suppress the price. As part of the campaign, David Kung and several employees of the Yangtze Development Corporation were arrested on allegations of holding foreign exchange. Soong Mei-ling called Chiang Kai-shek to complain and also called Chiang Ching-Kuo directly. David Kung was eventually freed after negotiations.

Kung had transferred funds overseas and had settled in the United States. After his aunt Soong Mei-ling came to the United States in 1975, she lived in an apartment that Kung bought for her on the Upper East Side of Manhattan. Kung Ling-kan died in New York, at the age of 76, in 1992. He had no children.
