= Soong Mei-ling =

Wife of Chiang Kai-shek (1898–2003)

- 宋美齡
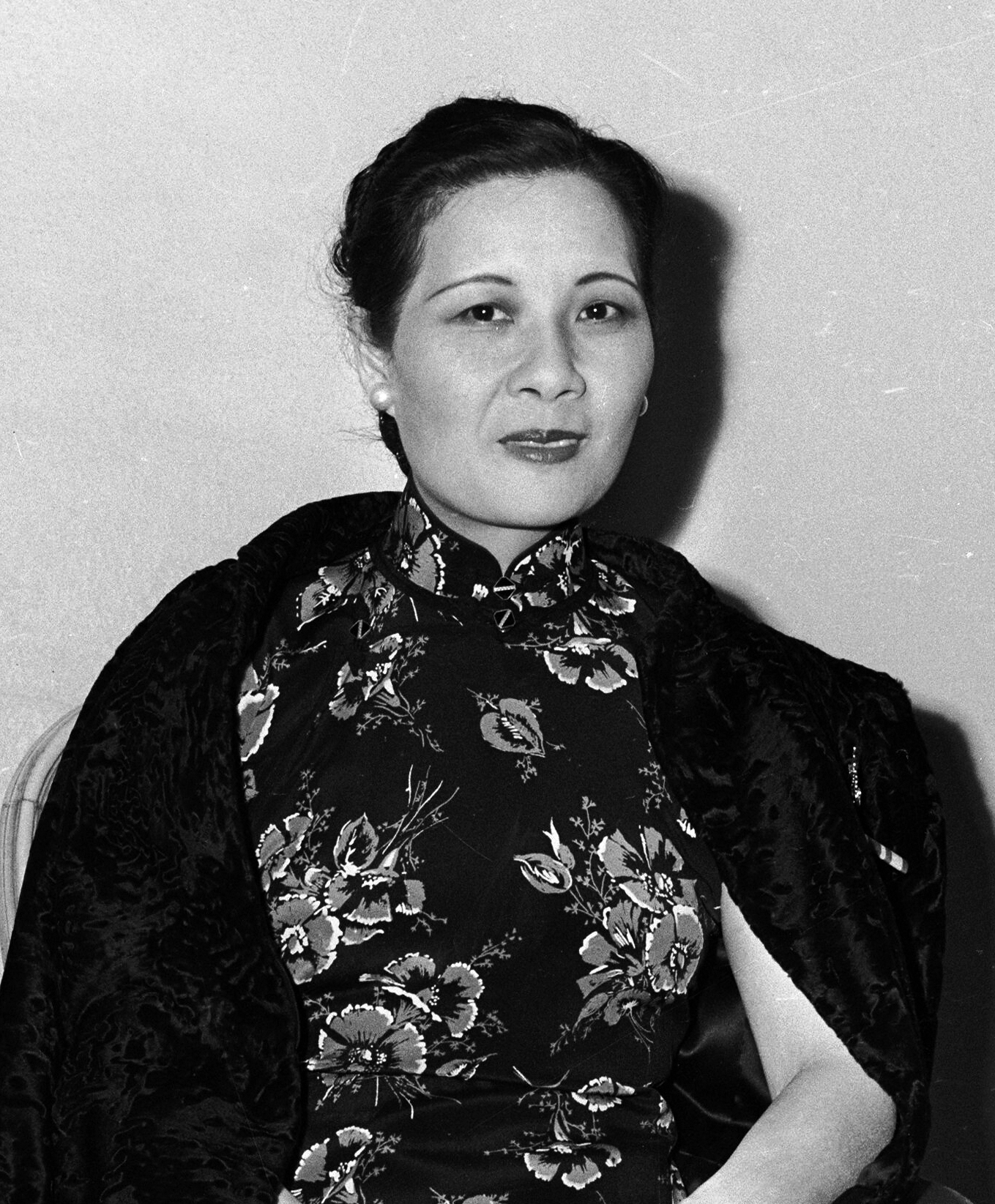
- Soong in 1943

First Lady of the Republic of China
- In office March 1, 1950 – April 5, 1975
- President: Chiang Kai-shek
- Preceded by: Role established
- Succeeded by: Liu Chi-chun
- In office August 1, 1943 – January 21, 1949
- President: Chiang Kai-shek
- Preceded by: Vacant
- Succeeded by: Guo Dejie
- In office October 10, 1928 – December 14, 1931
- President: Chiang Kai-shek
- Preceded by: Vacant
- Succeeded by: Vacant

Member of the Legislative Yuan
- In office November 7, 1928 – January 12, 1933
- Appointed by: Chiang Kai-shek

Personal details
- Born: March 4, 1898 Shanghai, China
- Died: October 23, 2003 (aged 105) New York, U.S.
- Resting place: Ferncliff Cemetery, Hartsdale, New York, U.S.
- Party: Kuomintang (ROC)
- Other political affiliations: Republican (US)
- Spouse: Chiang Kai-shek (m. 1927; died 1975)
- Children: Chiang Ching-kuo (step-son); Chiang Wei-kuo (adopted)
- Parents: Charlie Soong (father); Ni Kwei-tseng (mother)
- Relatives: Soong Ching-ling (sister); Soong Ai-ling (sister); T. V. Soong (brother)
- Education: Wesleyan College; Wellesley College (BA)
- Soong Mei-ling's voice Soong speaking at the Hollywood Bowl; Recorded April 4, 1943

Chinese name
- Traditional Chinese: 宋美齡
- Simplified Chinese: 宋美龄
Transcriptions
Standard Mandarin
- Hanyu Pinyin: Sòng Měilíng
- Wade–Giles: Sung^{4} Mei^{3}-ling^{2}
- IPA: [sʊ̂ŋ mèɪ.lǐŋ]
Yue: Cantonese
- Yale Romanization: Sung Méih-lìhng
- Jyutping: Sung^{3} Mei^{5}-ling^{4}

Soong Mei-ling (also spelled Soong May-ling; March 4, 1898 – October 23, 2003), also known as Madame Chiang (Chinese: 蔣夫人), was the First Lady of the Republic of China as the wife of Chiang Kai-shek. The youngest of the Soong sisters, she played a prominent role in Chinese politics and foreign relations in the first half of the 20th century.

== Early life ==
Soong Mei-ling was born in the Song family home, a traditional house called Neishidi (內史第), in Pudong, Shanghai, China. Her passport issued by the Qing government showed that she was born on March 4, 1898. Some sources said she was born on March 5, 1898, at St. Luke's Hospital in Shanghai, while others gave the year as 1897, since Chinese tradition considers one to be a year old at birth.

She was the fourth of six children of Charlie Soong, a wealthy businessman and former Methodist missionary from Hainan, and his wife Ni Kwei-tseng (倪桂珍; Ní Guìzhēn). Mei-ling's siblings were eldest sister Ai-ling, second sister Ching-ling, who later became Madame Sun Yat-sen, elder brother Tse-ven, usually known as T. V. Soong, and younger brothers Tse-liang (T.L.) and Tse-an (T.A.).

== Education ==
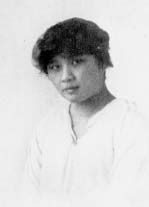
Mei-ling as a student at Wesleyan College c. 1910

In Shanghai, Mei-ling attended the McTyeire School for Girls with her sister, Ching-ling. Their father, who had studied in the United States, arranged to have them continue their education in the US in 1907. Mei-ling and Ching-ling attended a private school in Summit, New Jersey. In 1908, Ching-ling was accepted by her sister Ai-ling's alma mater, Wesleyan College, at age 15 and both sisters moved to Macon, Georgia, to join Ai-ling. Mei-ling insisted she have her way and be allowed to accompany her older sister though she was only ten, which she did. Mei-ling spent the year in Demorest, Georgia, with Ai-ling's Wesleyan friend, Blanche Moss, who enrolled Mei-ling as an 8th grader at Piedmont College. In 1909, Wesleyan's newly appointed president, William Newman Ainsworth, gave her permission to stay at Wesleyan and assigned her tutors. She briefly attended Fairmount College in Monteagle, Tennessee in 1910.

Mei-ling was officially registered as a freshman at Wesleyan in 1912 at the age of 15. She then transferred to Wellesley College two years later to be closer to her older brother, T. V., who, at the time, was studying at Harvard. By then, both her sisters had graduated and returned to Shanghai. She graduated from Wellesley as one of the 33 "Durant Scholars" on June 19, 1917, with a major in English literature and minor in philosophy. She was also a member of Tau Zeta Epsilon, Wellesley's Arts and Music Society. As a result of her American education, she spoke excellent English, with a southern accent which helped her connect with American audiences.

== Madame Chiang ==
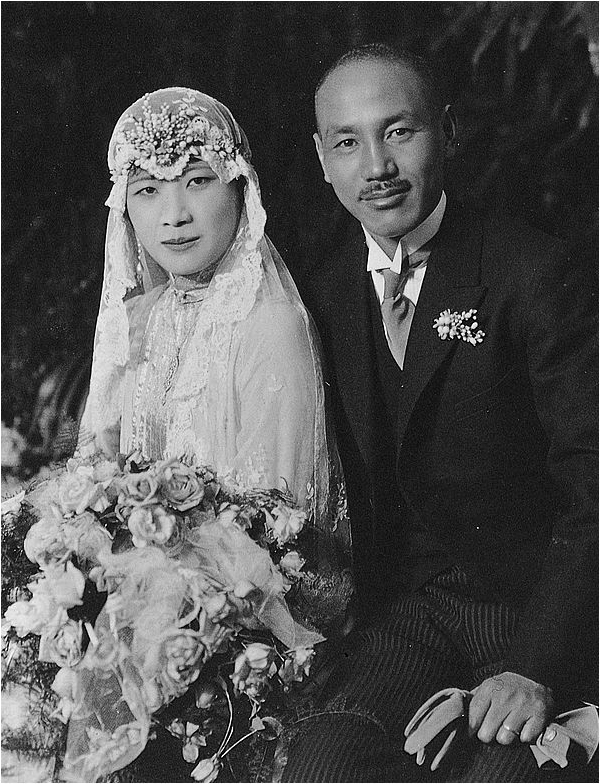
Chiang–Soong wedding photo

Soong Mei-ling met Chiang Kai-shek in 1920. Since he was eleven years her elder, already married, and a Buddhist, Mei-ling's mother vehemently opposed the marriage between the two, but finally agreed after Chiang showed proof of his divorce and promised to convert to Christianity. Chiang told his future mother-in-law that he could not convert immediately, because religion needed to be gradually absorbed, not swallowed like a pill. They married in Shanghai on December 1, 1927. Although biographers regard the marriage with varying appraisals of partnership, love, politics and competition, it lasted 48 years. The couple had no children.

Madame Chiang initiated the New Life Movement and became actively engaged in Chinese politics. As her husband rose to become generalissimo and leader of the Kuomintang, Madame Chiang acted as his English translator, secretary and advisor. In 1928, she was made a member of the Committee of Yuans by Chiang. She was a member of the Legislative Yuan from 1930 to 1932 and Secretary-General of the Chinese Aeronautical Affairs Commission from 1936 to 1938. In 1937 she led appeals to women to support the Second Sino-Japanese War, which led to the establishment of women's battalions, such as the Guangxi Women's Battalion.

In 1934, Soong Mei-ling was given a villa in Kuling town, Mount Lu. Chiang Kai-shek named the villa Mei Lu Villa to symbolize the beauty of the mountain. The couple usually stayed at this villa in summertime, so the mountain is called Summer Capital, and the villa is called the Summer Palace.

During World War II, Madame Chiang promoted the Chinese cause and tried to build a legacy for her husband. Well versed in both Chinese and Western culture, she became popular both in China and abroad.

In 1945 she became a member of the Central Executive Committee of the Kuomintang.

== "Warphans" ==
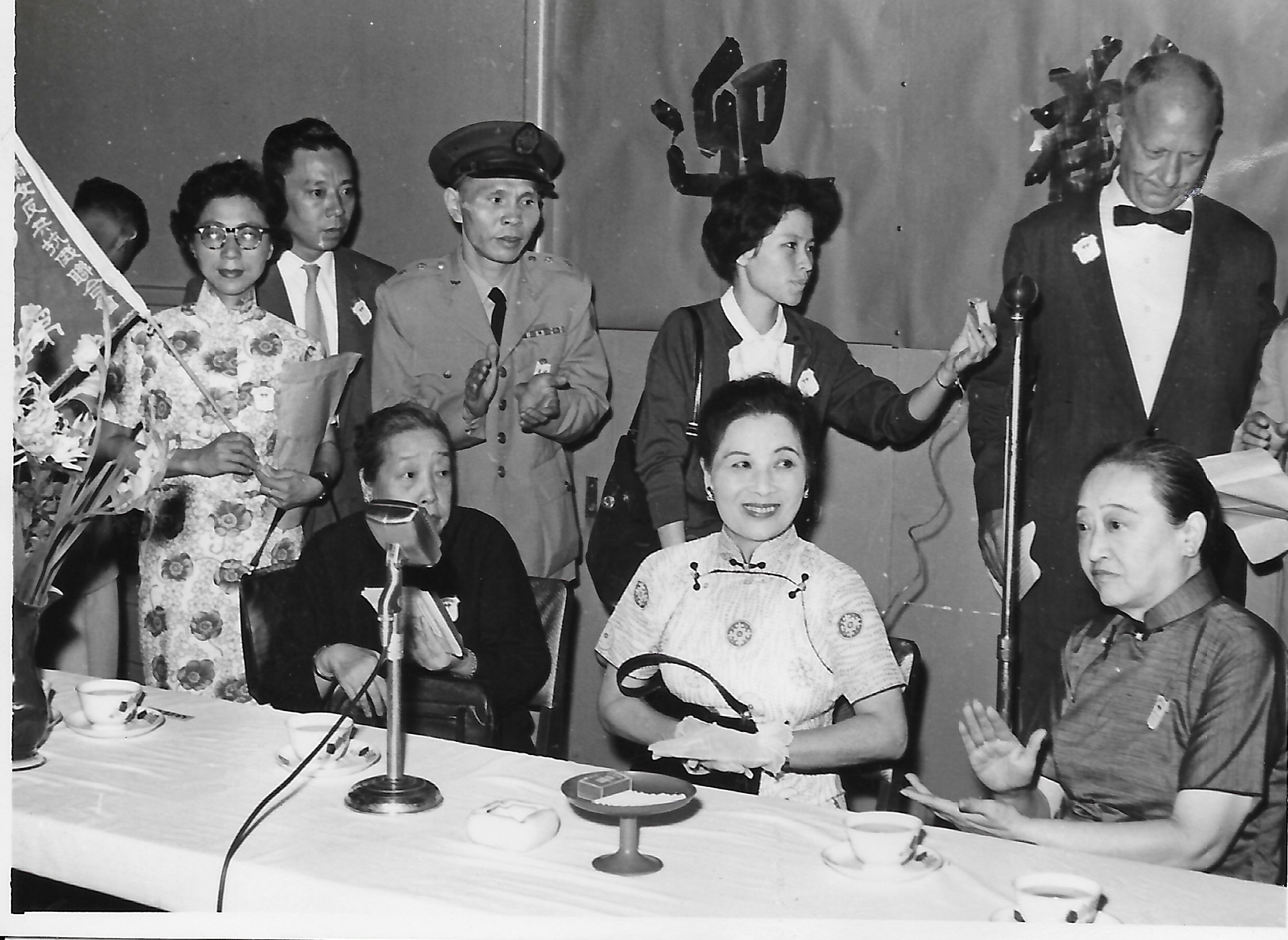
Soong Mei-ling (center, front row) visiting wounded soldiers at the Republic of China Army's Beitou Hospital during the Double Ten National Day celebrations, circa 1958. She is accompanied by members of the Chinese Women's Anti-Aggression League (婦聯會).

Although Soong Mei-ling initially avoided the public eye after marrying Chiang, she soon began an ambitious social welfare project to establish schools for the orphans of Chinese soldiers. The orphanages were well-appointed: with playgrounds, hotels, swimming pools, a gymnasium, model classrooms, and dormitories. Soong Mei-ling was deeply involved in the project and even picked all of the teachers herself. There were two schools – one for boys and one for girls—built on a 405-hectare (1,000-acre) site at the foot of Purple Mountain, in Nanjing. She referred to these children as her "warphans" and made them a personal cause. The fate of the children of fallen soldiers became a much more important issue in China after the beginning of the war with Japan in 1937. In order to better provide for these children she established the Chinese Women's National War Relief Society.

== Visits to the U.S. ==
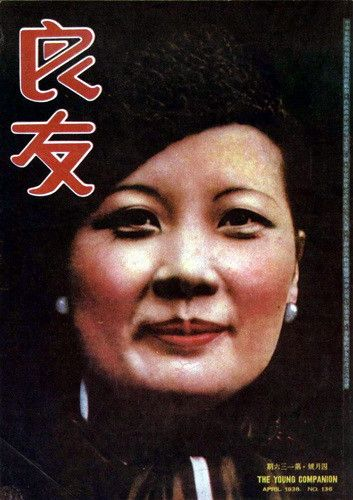
Soong Mei-ling on the cover of The Young Companion, April 1938, as Deputy Commander of the Republic of China Air Force

Soong Mei-ling made several tours to the United States to lobby support for the Nationalists' war effort. She drew crowds as large as 30,000 people and in 1943 made the cover of Time magazine for a third time. She had earlier appeared on the October 26, 1931, cover alongside her husband and on the January 3, 1937, cover, with her husband as "Man and Wife of the Year".

Soong dressed ostentatiously during her tours to seek foreign aid, bringing dozens of suitcases filled with Chanel handbags, pearl-decorated shoes, and other luxury garments on a visit to the White House. Soong's approach shocked United States First Lady Eleanor Roosevelt and prompted resentment from many officials in the Republic of China government.

Arguably showing the impact of her visits, in 1943, the United States Women's Army Corps recruited a unit of Chinese-American women to serve with the Army Air Forces as "Air WACs", referred to as the "Madame Chiang Kai-Shek Air WAC unit".

Both Soong Mei-ling and her husband were on good terms with Time magazine senior editor and co-founder Henry Luce, who frequently tried to rally money and support from the American public for the Republic of China. On February 18, 1943, she became the first Chinese national and the second woman to address both houses of the US Congress. After the defeat of her husband's government in the Chinese Civil War in 1949, Madame Chiang followed her husband to Taiwan, while her sister Soong Ching-ling stayed in mainland China, siding with the communists. Madame Chiang continued to play a prominent international role. She was a Patron of the International Red Cross Committee, honorary chair of the British United Aid to China Fund, and First Honorary Member of the Bill of Rights Commemorative Society.

== Allegations of corruption ==
Throughout the 1930s and 1940s, Soong's family embezzled $20 million. During this period, the Nationalist Government's revenues were less than $30 million per year. One of the key reasons was that Soong Mei-ling ignored her family's involvement in corruption. The Soong family's eldest son, T.V. Soong, was the Chinese premier finance minister, and the eldest daughter, Soong Ai-ling, was the wife of Kung Hsiang-hsi, the wealthiest man in China. The second daughter, Soong Ching-ling, was the wife of Sun Yat-sen, China's founding father. The youngest daughter, Soong Mei-ling, married Chiang in 1927, and following the marriage, the two families became intimately connected, creating the "Soong dynasty" and the "Four Families". However, Soong was also credited for her campaign for women's rights in China, including her attempts to improve the education, culture, and social benefits of Chinese women. Critics have said that the "Four Families" monopolized the regime and looted it. The US sent considerable aid to the Nationalist government but soon realized the widespread corruption. Military supplies that were sent appeared on the black market. Large sums of money that had been transmitted through T. V. Soong, China's finance minister, soon disappeared. President Truman famously referred to the Nationalist leaders, "They're thieves, every damn one of them." He also said, "They stole $750 million out of the billions that we sent to Chiang. They stole it, and it's invested in real estate down in São Paulo and some right here in New York." Soong Mei-ling and Soong Ai-ling lived luxurious lifestyles and held millions in property, clothes, art, and jewelry. Soong Ai-ling and Soong Mei-ling were also the two richest women in China. Despite living a luxurious life for almost her entire life, Soong Mei-ling left only a $120,000 inheritance, and the reason, according to her niece, was that she donated most of her wealth when she was still alive.

During Chiang Ching-kuo's enforcement campaign in Shanghai after the war, Chiang Ching-kuo arrested her nephew David Kung and several employees of the Yangtze Development Corporation on allegations of holding foreign exchange. Mei-ling called Chiang Kai-shek to complain and also called Chiang Ching-Kuo directly. Kung was eventually freed after negotiations.

== Alleged tryst with Wendell Willkie ==
There were allegations that Mei-ling had a tryst with Wendell Willkie, who had been the Republican candidate for president in 1940 and came to Chongqing on a world tour in 1942. The two are said to have left an official reception and gone to one of her private apartments. When Chiang Kai-shek noticed their absence, he gathered his bodyguards, who were armed with machine-guns, marched through the streets, and ransacked her apartment without finding the couple. She is said to have passionately kissed Willkie at the airport the next day and offered to come with him to the United States.

Some scholars have dismissed the allegations as weakly sourced and implausible. Jay Taylor's biography of Chiang points out that this infidelity was uncharacteristic of Mei-ling, and that it would have been unlikely for such a major commotion to go unnoticed. In a 2016 review of the evidence Perry Johansson dismisses the allegation entirely, as it was based on the later memory of one person, and he further cites the work of China historian Yang Tianshi. Yang reviewed the official schedules and newspaper accounts of Willkie's visit and found that there was no time or place where the alleged events could have taken place. He also found no mention of it in Chiang's detailed private diaries.

== Later life ==
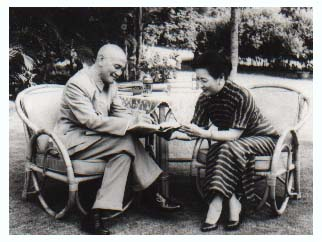
Soong Mei-ling and Chiang Kai-shek in Taipei, Taiwan, in 1955

After the death of her husband in 1975, Madame Chiang assumed a low profile. She was first diagnosed with breast cancer in 1975 and would undergo two mastectomies in Taiwan. She also had an ovarian tumor removed in 1991.

Chang Hsien-yi claimed that Soong Mei-ling and military officials loyal to her expedited the development of nuclear weapons and even set up a parallel chain of command to further their agenda.

Chiang Kai-shek was succeeded to power by his eldest son Chiang Ching-kuo, from a previous marriage, with whom Madame Chiang had rocky relations. In 1975, she emigrated from Taiwan to her family's 36-acre (14.6-hectare) estate in Lattingtown, New York, where she kept a portrait of her late husband in full military regalia in her living room. She kept a residence in Wolfeboro, New Hampshire, where she vacationed in the summer. Madame Chiang returned to Taiwan upon Chiang Ching-kuo's death in 1988, to shore up support among her old allies. However, Chiang Ching-kuo's successor, Lee Teng-hui, proved more adept at politics than she was, and consolidated his position. She again returned to the U.S. and made a rare public appearance in 1995 when she attended a reception held on Capitol Hill in her honor in connection with celebrations of the 50th anniversary of the end of World War II. Madame Chiang made her last visit to Taiwan in 1995. In the 2000 presidential election in Taiwan, the Kuomintang produced a letter from her in which she purportedly supported the KMT candidate Lien Chan over independent candidate James Soong (no relation). James Soong never disputed the authenticity of the letter. Soong sold her Long Island estate in 2000 and spent the rest of her life in the 10 Gracie Square apartment on the Upper East Side of Manhattan owned by her niece. An open house viewing of the estate drew many Taiwanese expatriates. When Madame Chiang was 103 years old, she had an exhibition of her Chinese paintings in New York.

== Death ==
Madame Chiang died in her sleep in New York City, in her Manhattan apartment on October 23, 2003, at the age of 105. She was the last and longest-lived of the Soong sisters. Her remains were interred at Ferncliff Cemetery in Hartsdale, New York, pending an eventual burial with her late husband who was entombed in Cihu, Taiwan. The stated intention is to have them both buried in mainland China once political differences are resolved.

Upon her death, the White House released a statement:

Madame Chiang was a close friend of the United States throughout her life, and especially during the defining struggles of the last century. Generations of Americans will always remember and respect her intelligence and strength of character. On behalf of the American people, I extend condolences to Madame Chiang's family members and many admirers around the world.

— George W. Bush

Jia Qinglin, chairman of the National Committee of the Chinese People's Political Consultative Conference (CPPCC), sent a message to Soong's relatives to mourn her death.

=== Appraisals by the international press ===
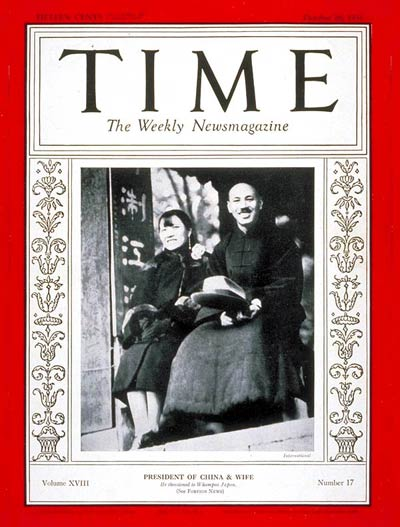
Soong and Chiang on the cover of Time magazine, October 26, 1931

The New York Times obituary wrote:

As a fluent English speaker, as a Christian, as a model of what many Americans hoped China to become, Madame Chiang struck a chord with American audiences as she traveled across the country, starting in the 1930s, raising money and lobbying for support of her husband's government. She seemed to many Americans to be the very symbol of the modern, educated, pro-American China they yearned to see emerge—even as many Chinese dismissed her as a corrupt, power-hungry symbol of the past they wanted to escape.

Life magazine called Madame the "most powerful woman in the world" while Liberty magazine described her as "the real brains and boss of the Chinese government." Writer and diplomat Clare Boothe Luce, wife of Time publisher Henry Luce, once compared her to Joan of Arc and Florence Nightingale. Author Ernest Hemingway called her the "empress" of China.

== Awards and honors ==
- Peru:
  - Grand Cross of Order of the Sun of Peru (1961)
- South Korea:
  - Order of Merit for National Foundation, 1st class (1966)
- Francoist Spain:
  - Grand Cross of Order of Isabella the Catholic (1965)

In 2019, Time created 89 new covers to celebrate women of the year starting from 1920; it chose Mei-ling for 1937.

== In popular culture ==
Her tour to San Francisco is mentioned (under the name Madame Chiang) in Last Night at the Telegraph Club, a 2021 novel by Malinda Lo. She also appears in "Cooking for Madame Chiang" in Dear Chrysanthemums (Scribner, 2023), a novel in stories by Fiona Sze-Lorrain. She is also a character in The 100-Year-Old Man who Climbed Out the Window and Disappeared, by Swedish author Jonas Jonasson.

In addition to the books written about her, both mainland China and Taiwan have since produced a vast variety of films and television series featuring her as a prominent character of the Second World War era. BBC News also dedicated an hour-long episode to her on their Extraordinary Women documentary series.

- Soong Meiling notably appears in the critically acclaimed 1997 Hong Kong film The Soong Sisters, portrayed by Chinese-American actress Vivian Wu, and starring Michelle Yeoh as one of her older sisters. In the movie, she tells a deeply angered Chiang Kai-shek not to harm her older socialist-leaning sister Soong Chingling after the latter began publicly criticizing his government and leadership, and despite their own political differences, Meiling privately warns Chingling that her life is at risk; she also tries urging her husband to prioritize fighting the Japanese invaders over attacking Mao's Communists. Her role in the Xi'an Incident is also highlighted, in which she flies to Xi'an and eventually manages to secure his release from Zhang Xueliang in the midst of challenging circumstances.
- She also appears again, portrayed by the same actress Vivian Wu, in the 2009 film Founding of a Republic, in which she personally tries to mediate between Chiang Ching-kuo and her nephew David Kung Ling-kan over corruption disputes in Shanghai. In another scene in Washington D.C., she also unsuccessfully tries to persuade her friend George C. Marshall to provide additional assistance to the Chinese government, which is rejected after he states that the U.S. has already given them a loan of $400 million recently.
- Meiling is depicted in the 2015 movie Cairo Declaration by Hong Kong actress Carina Lau, in which she accompanies her husband to meet with U.S. President Franklin D. Roosevelt and other world leaders in the 1943 Cairo Conference and serves as his principal translator and envoy.

== Gallery ==
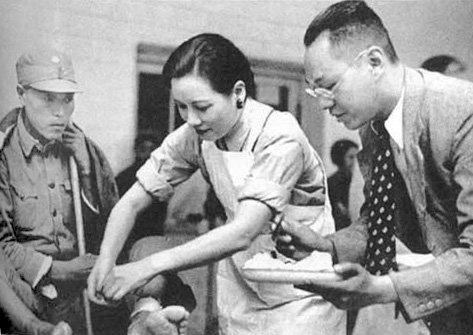
Soong giving a bandage to an injured Chinese soldier (c. 1942)

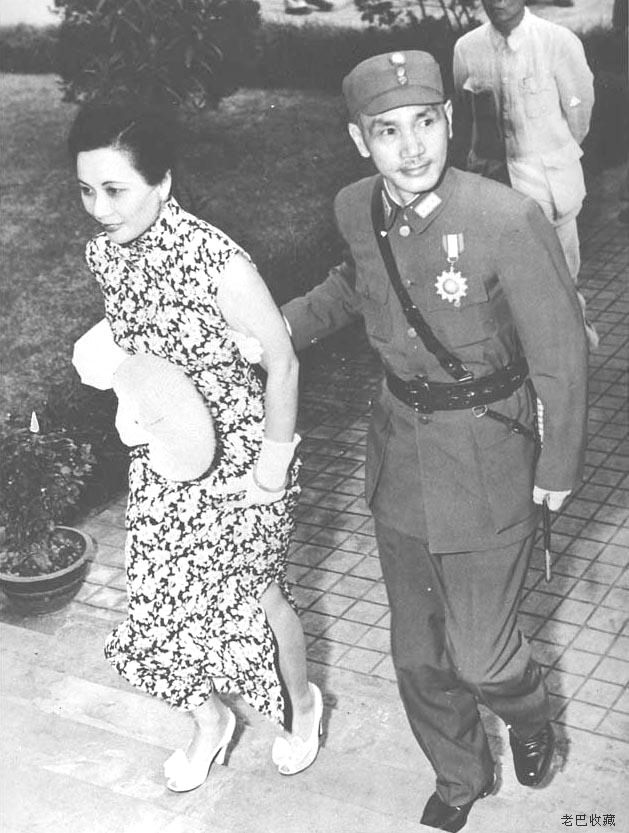
Chiang and Soong in 1943

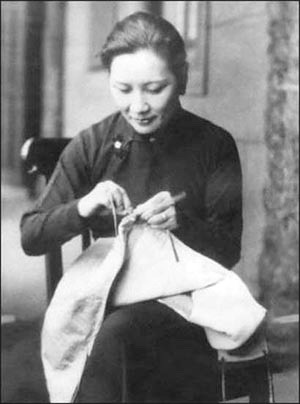
Soong stitching uniforms for National Revolutionary Army soldiers.

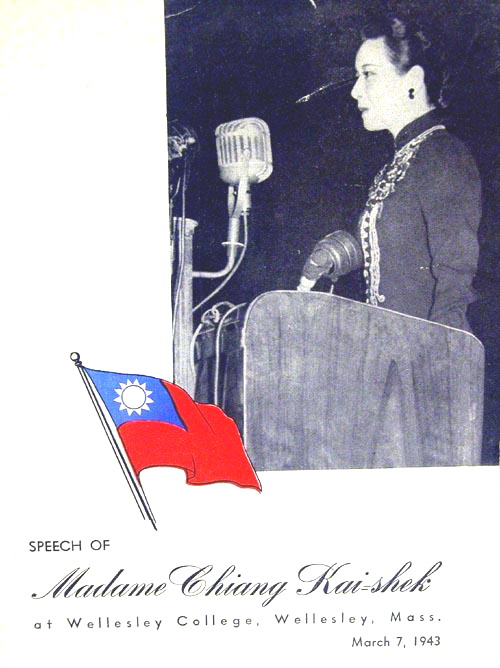
1943 Wellesley College speech poster.

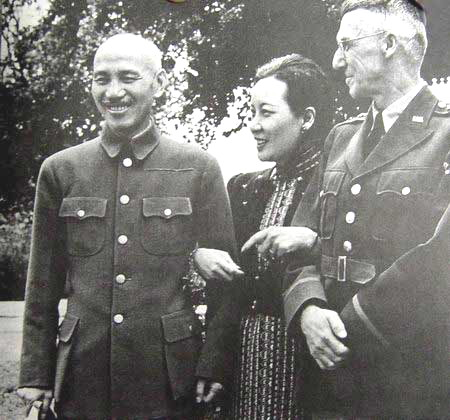
1942 Chiang, Soong and Joseph Stilwell in Burma.

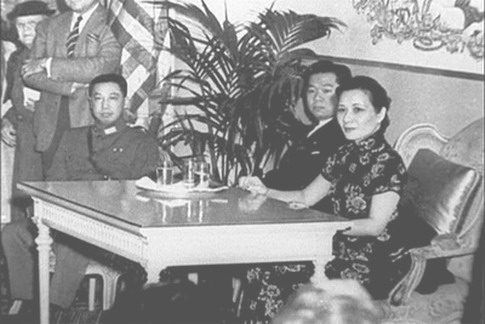
1943 Soong in the White House Oval Office to conduct a press conference.

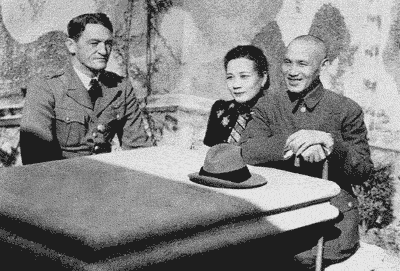
Soong sitting close to Chiang opposite Claire Lee Chennault.

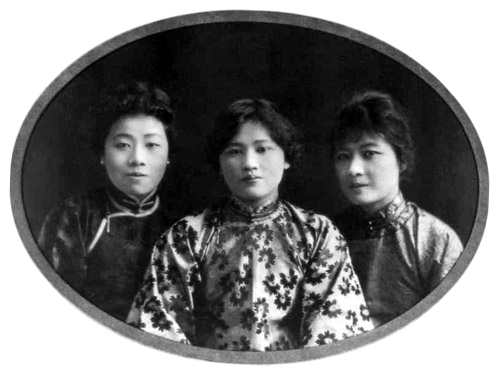
The three Soong sisters in their youth, with Soong Ching-ling in the middle, and Soong Ai-ling (left) and Soong Mei-ling (right)

== Internet videos ==
- 1937 video-cast of Soong Mei-ling address to the world in English on YouTube
- (in Chinese) Soong Mei-ling and the China Air Force
- 1995: US senators held a reception for Soong Mei-ling in recognition of China's role as a US ally in World War II.

== See also ==
- Second Sino-Japanese War
- Xi'an Incident
- History of the Republic of China
- Military of the Republic of China
- President of the Republic of China
- Politics of the Republic of China
- Soong sisters
  - Soong Ai-ling
  - Soong Ching-ling
- Claire Lee Chennault
- Flying Tigers
- Chiang Fang-liang
- National Revolutionary Army
- Sino-German cooperation (1911–1941)
- Address to Congress – the full text of her 1943 address
- The Last Empress: Madame Chiang Kai-shek and the Birth of Modern China – a 2009 biography of Soong Mei-ling
- Meiling Palace

Honorary titles
Preceded by None	First Lady of the Republic of China; 1948–1975	Succeeded by Liu Chi-chun
