= T. V. Soong =

Chinese financier and politician (1894-1971)

- 宋子文
[[File:T. V. Soong Edit.jpg
|frameless|upright=1]]

Premier of China
- In office 31 March 1945 – 1 March 1947
- President: Chiang Kai-shek
- Preceded by: Chiang Kai-shek
- Succeeded by: Chiang Kai-shek (acting)

Acting Premier of China
- In office 25 September 1930 – 18 November 1930
- President: Chiang Kai-shek
- Vice Premier: Himself
- Preceded by: Tan Yankai
- Succeeded by: Chiang Kai-shek

Vice Premier of China
- In office 29 January 1932 – 4 November 1933
- Premier: Wang Jingwei
- Preceded by: Chen Mingshu
- Succeeded by: Kung Hsiang-hsi
- In office 11 October 1930 – 16 December 1931
- Premier: Himself (acting); Chiang Kai-shek
- Preceded by: Feng Yuxiang
- Succeeded by: Chen Mingshu

Minister of Finance
- In office August 1925 – 1927
- Preceded by: Liao Zhongkai
- Succeeded by: Sun Fo
- In office 1928–1933
- Premier: Tan Yankai; Chiang Kai-shek; Sun Fo; Wang Jingwei
- Preceded by: Sun Fo
- Succeeded by: H. H. Kung

Personal details
- Born: Soong Tse-vung; 4 December 1894 Shanghai, International settlement
- Died: 25 April 1971 (aged 76) San Francisco, California, United States
- Resting place: Ferncliff Cemetery and Mausoleum, Hartsdale, Westchester County, New York, US
- Party: Kuomintang
- Spouse: Lo-Yi Chang
- Parent(s): Charlie Soong and Nyi Kwei-twang (Ni Kwei-tseng)
- Education: Harvard University (BA); Columbia University

Soong Tse-vung (Note: Soong Tse-ven or Soong Tzu-wen) (Chinese: 宋子文; pinyin: Sòng Zǐwén; 4 December 1894 – 25 April 1971), more commonly known as T. V. Soong, was a Chinese businessman and politician who served as Premier of China in 1930 and from 1945 to 1947.

== Early life and education ==
T. V. Soong was born to the wealthy Soong family on December 4, 1894, at St. Luke's Hospital in the Shanghai International Settlement. His sisters, known collectively as the Soong sisters, married important persons: the first, Ai-ling, married H. H. Kung, an Oberlin College graduate from a leading family of Chinese bankers who went on to become Premier of the Republic of China; the second, Ching-ling, married Sun Yat-sen, the founder and leader of the Chinese nationalist movement; and the third, Mei-ling, was First Lady of the Republic of China as the wife of Chiang Kai-shek.

After attending St. John's University, Shanghai, for a year, Soong was sent by his father to be educated in the United States at Harvard University, where he studied economics and graduated from Harvard College with a Bachelor of Arts in 1915. He then pursued graduate studies at Columbia University while simultaneously working at the International Banking Corporation in New York.

== Career ==
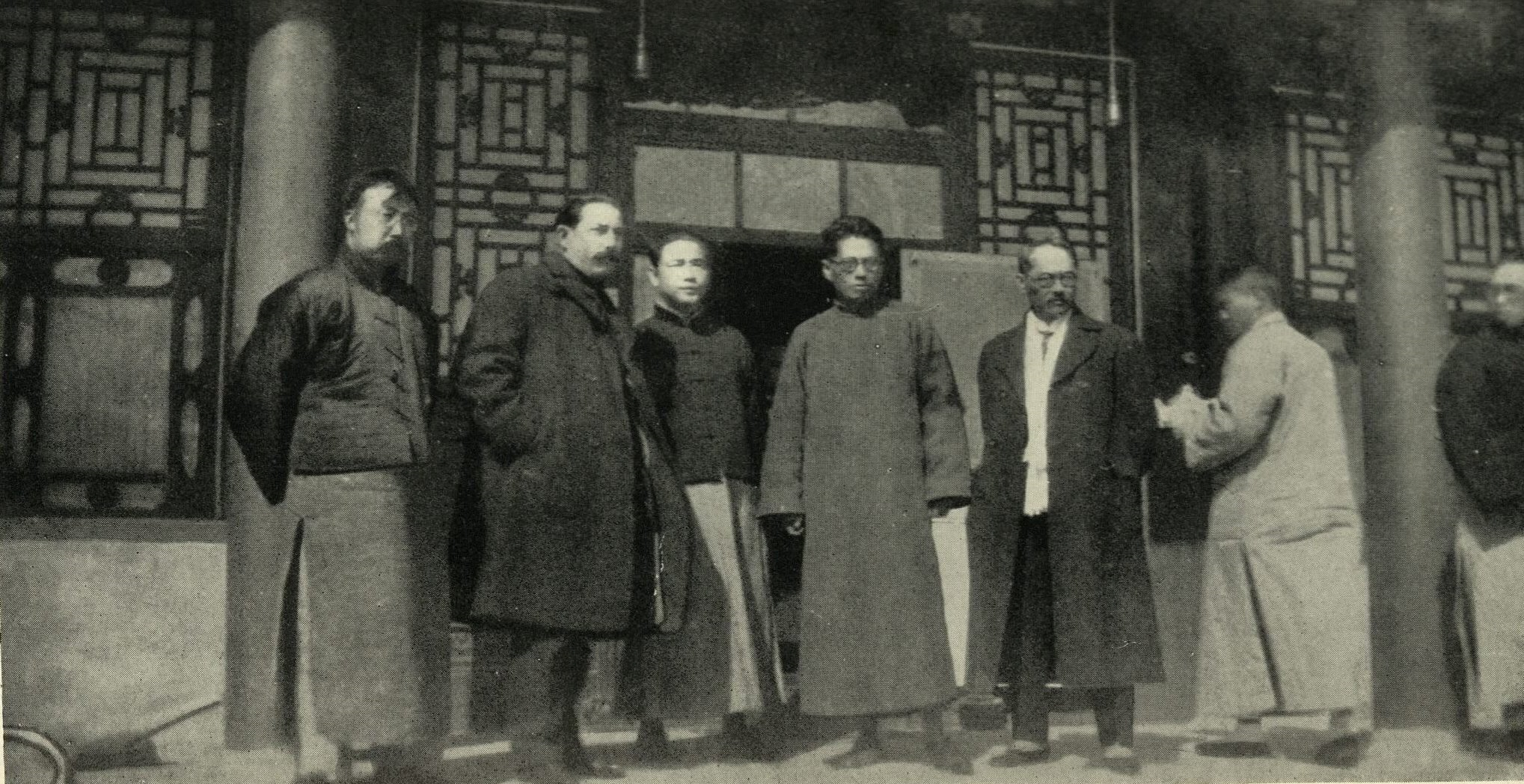
Soong as a leader of Wuhan nationalist government.

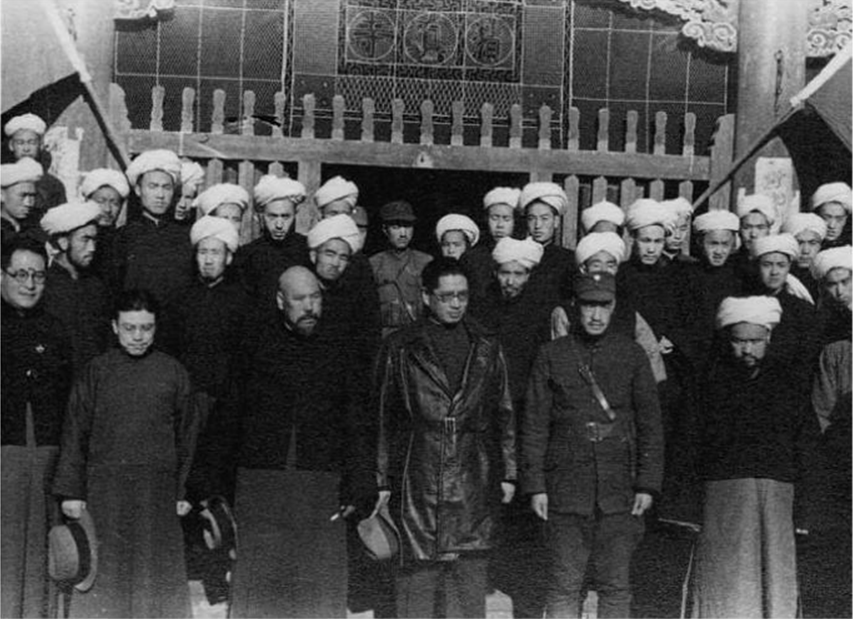
Soong at a mosque in Xining, Qinghai.

Upon returning to China, he worked for several industrial enterprises, and was then recruited by Sun Yat-sen to develop finances for his Canton government. He served as Minister of Finance from August 1925 until 1927. After the success of Chiang Kai-shek's Northern Expedition in 1927, Soong served in a succession of offices in the Nationalist Government, including as Governor of the Central Bank of China (1928–1934) and as Minister of Finance (1928–1933).

He founded the China Development Finance Corporation (CDFC) in 1934, along with other prominent financial figures, such as Chang Kia-ngau, Chen Guangpu and H.H. Kung. CDFC provided China's chief access to foreign investment for the next decade. Many CDFC financial packages benefitted companies that were related to Soong or his family members.

In the summer of 1940, Chiang appointed Soong to Washington, D.C., as his personal representative. His task was to win support for China's war with Japan. Soong successfully negotiated substantial loans for this purpose. After Pearl Harbor, Chiang appointed Soong Minister of Foreign Affairs, though Soong remained in Washington to manage the alliance with both the U.S. and the U.K.

During his tenure as Finance Minister, he managed to balance China's budget, which was no small accomplishment. He resigned in 1933, displeased with Chiang Kai-shek's appeasement of Japan and attempts to placate Japanese aggression. He later returned to service as Minister of Foreign Affairs (1942–1945), and as President of the Executive Yuan (1945–1947). Soong left his legacy as head of the Chinese delegation to the United Nations Conference on International Organization in San Francisco, April 1945, which later became the United Nations.

During the German invasion of Russia, Soong was in charge of negotiating with the Soviet leader Joseph Stalin regarding Soviet interests in China, and travelled to Moscow to extract from Stalin a guarantee to oppose the Chinese Communist Party. Soong conceded to Stalin the Manchurian railways and Korean independence but refused to allow Soviet interference in Xinjiang or military bases in Manchuria. He also indicated that China and the Soviet Union could share dominion over Mongolia if a "mutual assistance pact" was agreed to. Soong was known for his tough negotiating style with Stalin in getting straight to the point and freely using the threat of American military backing to strengthen his demands. When the Sino-Soviet treaty was signed, China ceded to the Soviets parts of Mongolia, the use of a naval base at Port Arthur (with civilian rule remaining Chinese), and co-ownership of the Chinese Eastern Railway in Manchuria.

In return, Soong extracted from Stalin recognition of the Republic of China as the legitimate regime of China, aid from the Soviets, and an oral agreement to an eventual Soviet withdrawal from Manchuria. The treaty failed to end tension in China with the communists, which resulted in renewed fighting after the Chinese communist revolution. Stalin had previously told the Americans that Franklin Roosevelt should inform Chiang Kai-shek of the Russian demands in Manchuria, at the Yalta Conference, before Stalin informed Soong.

During the war years, he financed the Flying Tigers, an American mercenary group that was later incorporated into the United States Air Force. Gen. Claire Chennault was listed as an employee of the Bank of China. On this project Soong worked very closely with his sister, May-ling Soong. He once remarked to John Paton Davies, Jr., one of the China Hands, that there were no U.S. State Department memos sent from China to which he did not have access within a few days.

Criticism of Soong increased as the Nationalist government's financial crisis increased during January and early February 1947. Rival Nationalist individuals and factions which criticized him included those associated with Sun Fo, Zhang Qun, CC Clique, and the Gexin movement. The Gexin movement criticized Soong for what the group described as his bureaucratic capitalism, a phrase likely adopted from the communists' criticisms of Soong. The Gexin movement influenced many newspapers' criticisms of Soong. Its criticisms of Soong were also echoed in the Legislative Yuan.

On 1 March 1947, Soong resigned as president of the Executive Yuan. Nonetheless, Soong was active in the Nationalist government's financial policy until he moved to the United States in January 1949. Soong moved to New York and remained an influential member of the China Lobby.

== Death ==
On 25 April 1971, Soong choked to death in San Francisco at a dinner party hosted by the chairman of the San Francisco branch of the Bank of Canton, when a piece of chicken lodged in his windpipe. Soong was survived by his widow, Lo-Yi Chang (張樂怡; Zhāng Lèyí) who had taken on the English name of Laura Chang Soong.

== See also ==
- Economic history of China (1912–1949)
- History of the Republic of China

== Sources ==
- Halberstam, David (2007). The Coldest Winter: America and the Korean War. New York: Hyperion. ISBN 978-1-4013-0052-4.
- Boorman, Howard (1967). Biographical Dictionary of Republican China. New York: Columbia University Press. ISBN 0-231-08957-0.

Seagrave, Sterling (19 April 1986). The Soong Dynasty. Harper Perennial. ISBN 0-06-091318-5.

Government offices
Preceded by Tan Yankai	Premier of China; 1930	Succeeded by Chiang Kai-shek
Preceded by Chiang Kai-shek	Premier of China; 1945–1947	Succeeded by Chiang Kai-shek
