= The Last Empress: Madame Chiang Kai-shek and the Birth of Modern China =

2009 biography of Soong May-ling

- Cover of the 2010 first edition.
- Author: Hannah Pakula
- Language: English
- Genre: History; Biography
- Publisher: Simon & Schuster (US)
- Publication date: November 3, 2009
- Publication place: United States
- Media type: Print (Hardback)
- Pages: 816
- ISBN: 978-1-4391-4893-8

The Last Empress: Madame Chiang Kai-shek and the Birth of Modern China is a 2009 biography of Soong Mei-ling, wife of Kuomintang leader and President of the Republic of China Chiang Kai-shek written by Hannah Pakula. The book was widely reviewed as extensively researched and strongly put forward the argument that Madame Chiang and her husband have not been given the credit they deserve in shaping the modern Chinese nation. It has been translated into Chinese in two editions, one in Taiwan and one in Beijing, both by the same translator.

Pakula is also the author of biographies of Princess Marie, Queen of Romania and the Empress Frederick (daughter of Queen Victoria and mother of Kaiser Wilhelm II).

== Reception ==
The most extensive review was by Jonathan Spence in the New York Review of Books. He called the book a "lengthy and intensely detailed study," and used the material to make observations about May-ling's life and political significance. In particular Spence argues that one specific period, from late 1942 to the summer of 1943, provided "a kind of turning point in May-ling’s story." For it was in this short period, he explains, that the "complex and contradictory facets of her life became sharply visible, and that her personal predilections and self-regard began to edge out her better judgments concerning her role in the formation of China’s future." Spence wrote that "looking over Pakula’s careful summary of this period, one grows convinced that Mme Chiang was beginning to believe in her own significance and power at a new level..." Spence also asks "to what extent—if any—is it helpful to call Mme Chiang “The Last Empress” as Pakula does?" For she "never really had a coherent vision that we might call “imperial,” and her own access to political power was episodic and never certain."

Jonathan Mirsky reviewing the book in the New York Times remarks that the book is a "doorstop of a biography, so ample that Madame Chiang often disappears." He notes that Pakula has "combed through many English-language archives and secondary materials and conducted some revealing interviews, though she uses no sources in Chinese and offers little evaluation of the ones she does use." He concludes that Pakula’s biography is "often absorbing" and that Madame Chiang "emerges as more than just her husband’s wife; we see a brilliant, scheming, deliberately alluring, brave, corrupt chameleon of a woman..." He does note that inaccuracies were bound to creep in. The writer Lu Xun was not "buried alive" by Chiang Kai-shek, but succumbed to illness in 1936, and that it oversimplifies history to say that “like Chiang” the Chinese Communist Party “did not hesitate to enrich itself through the sale of narcotics.” Both Mao and Chiang used opium revenues, but both conducted effective campaigns against the drug after 1949.

Seth Faison in the Los Angeles Times Book Review noted "a few factual errors and cultural slip-ups", found Pakula "tone-deaf to the subtleties of Chinese culture and history", and thought the title "The Last Empress" was inappropriate (calling Soong instead "the first and most influential first lady ever" of modern China).

In The New Republic, Columbia professor Andrew J. Nathan, reviewing the book along with Jay Taylor's The Generalissimo, observed that Chiang Kai-shek and his wife had been eulogized during the Second Sino-Japanese War but also denounced as "corrupt, venal, and weak." With these two biographies, he continued, the "wheel of historiography never stops turning. Both of the Chiangs have now come in for sympathetic re-evaluations, each convincing in its way." After praising Taylor's research, he declares that although Pakula quotes occasionally from Chinese sources (evidently consulted through the offices of an assistant), her "immensely long book is mostly an assemblage of quotations from contemporary observers and later historians who wrote in English." What "seems to count" is "whether a story is fun to read" But he concludes that the book is "nevertheless hugely effortful and often enjoyable to read." Pakula "handles a complex cast of characters and a turbulent political environment with aplomb," and her account of personal matters probes more deeply than Taylor's.

== Translations ==
- 林添貴 (Lin Tiangui) (tr.) (2011). 宋美齡新傳 (Song Meiling Xin Zhuan). Taipei: Yuan liu chu ban shi ye gu fen you xian gong si. ISBN 9789573267522.
- 林添贵 Lin Tiangui (tr) (2012). 宋美龄传 (Song Meiling Zhuan). Beijing: Dong fang chu ban she. ISBN 9787506043571.
