= Soong Ai-ling =

Chinese businesswoman (1889–1973); wife of H. H. Kung

Nancy Soong Ai-ling
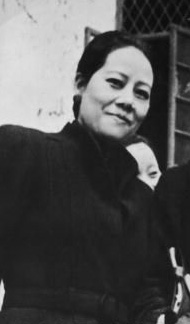
- Born: 15 July 1889; Shanghai International Settlement
- Died: 20 October 1973 (aged 84); New York City, U.S.
- Spouse: Kung Hsiang-hsi (m. 1914; died 1967)
- Children: 4, including Kung Ling-i and David Kung Ling-kan
- Parent(s): Charlie Soong; Ni Kwei-tseng

Soong Ai-ling (traditional Chinese: 宋藹齡 or 宋靄齡; simplified Chinese: 宋蔼龄 or 宋霭龄; pinyin: Sòng Àilíng; July 15, 1889 – October 20, 1973), legally Soong E-ling or Eling Soong, Christian name Nancy, was a Chinese businesswoman, the eldest of the Soong sisters and the wife of H. H. Kung (Kung Hsiang-Hsi), who was the richest man in the early 20th century Republic of China.

== Life ==
Born in Shanghai, she attended McTyeire School beginning at age 5. Soong Ai-ling arrived at the Port of San Francisco, California on June 30, 1904, aboard the SS Korea at the age of 14. She attended Wesleyan College in Macon, Georgia. Soong returned to China in 1909 after her graduation. In late 1911, she worked as a secretary for Sun Yat-sen, a job later taken by her sister, Soong Ching-ling, who later became Madame Sun Yat-sen.

Soong Ai-ling met her future husband, Kung Hsiang Hsi, in 1913, and they married the following year in Yokohama. After marrying, Soong taught English for a while and engaged in child welfare work. She is credited with being the most forceful of her siblings. In 1927 Chiang Kai-shek, head of the Kuomintang, was smitten with her sister, Meiling, but the family did not think him worthy. Ailing is said to have negotiated the marriage : Chiang would study the Bible; Ailing's husband, H.H. Kung, would become Chiang's financier; and her younger brother, T.V. Soong, would pressure bankers and industrialists to finance Chiang's regime.

In 1936, she founded the Sandai Company (also called Sanbu Company) and became a successful and immensely rich businesswoman in her own right. During the Second Sino-Japanese War, she was active in the Committee of the National Friends of the Wounded Soldiers and the National Refugee Children's Association, and chair of the local Hong Kong section of the Committee of the National Friends of the Wounded Soldiers.

The three Soong sisters made public appearances in Hong Kong in favor of relief work until 1940, when the Japanese radio stated that they would evacuate rather than join the Chinese government in Chongqing to endure the war conditions. In response to this, they left for Chongqing, where they continued to appear to boost public morale touring hospitals, air-raid shelter systems and bomb sites during the war. They took control of Indusco (also called Gungho), founded by Rewi Alley and others to protect Chinese industry during wartime conditions. Soong Ai-ling was most active of the sisters.

During the later years of the war, Soong Ai-ling, her husband, and her children were accused of graft, corruption, black-marketing and war profiteering. In 1944, her husband was finally asked to step down as minister of finance. She and her husband transferred their immense wealth and business abroad and left for the US.

She died at age 84 on October 20, 1973 at New York-Presbyterian Hospital in New York City. She is interred in a mausoleum at Ferncliff Cemetery in Westchester County, New York.

== Children ==
- Kung Ling-i (daughter) 孔令儀
- Kung Ling-kan (son) 孔令侃
- Kung Ling-chun, also known as Kung Ling-wei (daughter) 孔令俊
- Kung Ling-chie (son) 孔令傑, also known as Louis C. Kung, was later an American oil executive. He married actress Debra Paget in 1964; they divorced in 1980. The couple had one son, Gregory Teh-chi Kung (1964-1996) 孔德基. Louis C. Kung died in 1996 in Houston, Texas.

Soong sisters family tree

Charlie Soong; 1863–1918	Ni Kwei-Tseng; 1869–1931
Soong Ai-ling	H. H. Kung	Soong Ching-ling	Sun Yat-sen	T. V. Soong	Lo-Yi Chang	Soong Mei-ling	Chiang Kai-shek	Soong Zi-liang	Soong Zi-on	胡其瑛
Rosemond Kung	孔令侃	孔令伟	孔令杰	宋琼颐	宋曼颐	宋瑞颐	宋伯熊	宋仲虎

== Media portrayal ==
In the 1997 Hong Kong movie The Soong Sisters, Soong was portrayed by actress Michelle Yeoh.

== See also ==
- History of the Republic of China
- Soong Ching-ling
- Soong Mei-ling
