= 10 Gracie Square =

Residential building in Manhattan, New York

Coordinates: 40°46′23″N 73°56′42″W

10 Gracie Square (2026)

10 Gracie Square is a cooperative apartment building on the Upper East Side of Manhattan in New York City. Constructed between 1930 and 1931 in the Art Deco style, it is located on 84th Street between East End Avenue and the FDR Drive. It is one of only 42 "good buildings" in Manhattan as designated by Tom Wolfe, and is known for its sixteen-room triplexes.

Prior to the construction of the FDR Drive, which eliminated its river access, the building once had a residents' only yacht mooring on the East River. Prior residents include: Brooke Astor, Frances Schreuder, Jean Stein, Soong Mei-ling, Amanda Burden, and Gloria Vanderbilt.
