= Ni Kwei-tseng =

Chinese Christian educator (1868–1931)

- 倪珪珍
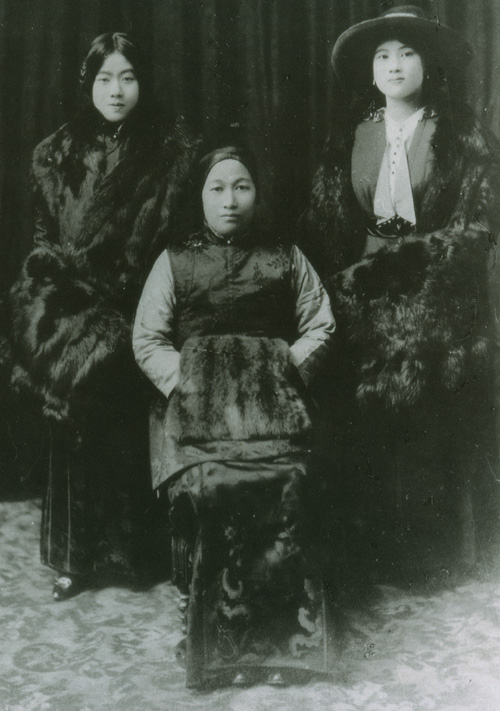
- Soong Ching-ling, Soong Ai-ling and Ni
- Born: 22 June 1869; Chuansha, Jiangsu, China
- Died: 23 July 1931 (aged 62); Qingdao, China
- Resting place: Shanghai International Cemetery
- Education: McTyeire School for Girls
- Known for: Mother of the Soong sisters
- Spouse: Charlie Soong (m. 1887; died 1918)

"Katherine" Ni Kwei-tseng (Chinese: 倪珪珍; pinyin: Ní Guìzhēn; 22 June 1868 – 23 July 1931), also spelled as Ni Guizhen, was a Chinese Christian educator and philanthropist, who was the wife of Charlie Soong and the mother of Soong sisters.

== Early life ==
Born in Chuansha to a devout Christian family on 22 June 1869, she was the 17th-generation descendant of Xu Guangqi, the Ming Dynasty scholar and astronomer who played a pivotal role in introducing Western science and Catholicism to China. The Ni family, which had a Catholic tradition, was a predominant family in Yuyao, Zhejiang. Her grandmother adopted Protestantism in 1859, under the influences of British and American missionaries. Her father, Ni Yunshan was a devoted believer, who was educated in Shanghai and became a Protestant minister there.

Ni was among the first women in Shanghai to receive a modern education, attending the McTyeire School for Girls, a pioneering institution founded by American missionaries. Fluent in English, skilled in mathematics, and musically talented, she defied traditional gender norms, notably refraining from the practice of foot-binding. Her progressive mindset enabled her to challenge conventional Chinese views on women's roles.

== Marriage and missionary works ==
Ni met Charlie Soong at McTyeire School for Girls. In 1887, Ni married Charlie Soong. Their marriage was groundbreaking, as both partners pursued mutual respect and collaboration rather than conforming to arranged marriage traditions. Together, they engaged in missionary work, philanthropy, and entrepreneurship, founding schools, printing presses, and businesses in Shanghai and beyond. The couple initially engaged in missionary work and business in Kunshan, later continuing their missionary efforts in Chuansha.

== Mother of Soong sisters ==
As a mother, Ni Guizhen was celebrated for her rigorous yet nurturing approach to raising six children, including the illustrious Soong sisters—Ai-ling, Ching-ling, and May-ling—and three sons, two of whom held prominent roles in the Republic of China's government. Soong Ai-ling married H. H. Kung in 1914, after working for Sun Yat-sen. H. H. Kung was the richest person in China and later served as the governor of the Bank of China, finance minister and premier of the Republic of China. In June 1915, Soong Ching-ling returned to Shanghai to seek her parents' permission to marry Sun Yat-sen, the founder of the Republic of China. Ni, as her mother, strongly opposed the idea, pointing out that Sun Yat-sen's son, Sun Fo, was even older than Ching-ling. Both Ni and Charlie Soong traveled to Japan to dissuade Ching-ling, but despite their efforts, Ni ultimately forgave Sun Yat-sen and accepted the marriage. In 1927, Soong Mei-ling sought her mother's approval to marry Chiang Kai-shek. Initially, Ni objected to the union, but Chiang personally travelled to Japan to appeal to her. As a condition, Ni insisted that Chiang convert to Christianity, to which he agreed.

== Death and burial ==
On 15 July 1931, Ni travelled by sea from Shanghai to Qingdao for a vacation with Soong Mei-ling and T. L. Soong. In Qingdao, Ni stayed in a two-storey villa equipped with a lift, purchased by T. V. Soong in 1930. This villa was the first residence in Qingdao to feature a lift. Shortly after her arrival, Ni became gravely ill. Despite treatment attempts by foreign doctors at Faber Hospital, her illness could not be cured. On 19 July, Mei-ling returned to Shanghai. On 23 July, upon hearing news of an attempted assassination of her son, T. V. Soong, at Shanghai North Railway Station, Ni suffered a stroke and died.

Her coffin was placed in the courtyard for seven days, during which many people came to mourn her. The mourners included prominent party leaders, high-ranking officials, military officers in Qingdao, and notable businesspeople. When the coffin was transferred, it was carried by T. V. Soong, her eldest son, along with a team of 64 bearers. The Soong sisters and other family members followed in carriages at the end of the procession. Hu Ruoyu and Shen Honglie hosted two major public mourning ceremonies on Zhongshan Road, on behalf of the Municipal Government of Qingdao and the Northeast Fleet. Shen later accompanied the coffin back to Shanghai, where a burial ceremony was held on 18 August 1931 at the International Cemetery.

== See also ==
- Soong Sisters
