= Chinatown Ice Cream Factory =

Ice cream parlor in New York City

Coordinates: 40°42′56″N 73°59′53″W

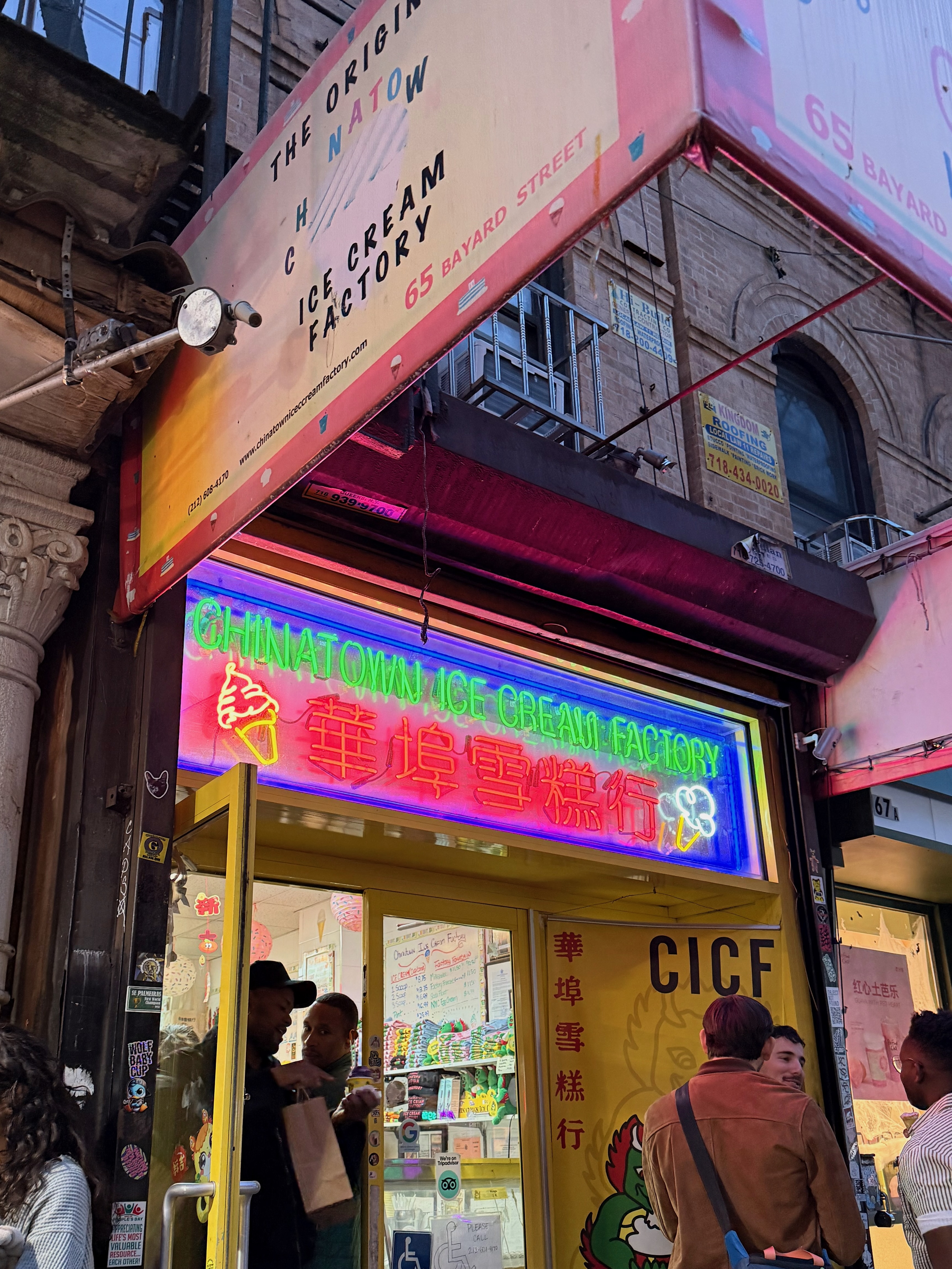

Restaurant information
- Established: 1977
- Owner: Christina Seid
- Food type: Ice cream
- Location: New York, New York, U.S.
- Other locations: 3
- Founder: Phillip Seid

The Chinatown Ice Cream Factory is an ice cream parlor in Chinatown, Manhattan, New York City. The business opened in 1977, and is known for their Asian-inspired ice cream flavors. They have also opened two additional locations, in Flushing and the Lower East Side.

== History ==
In 1977, Chinese-American businessman Phillip Seid and one of his brothers opened Chinatown Ice Cream Factory, selling 45 cent ice cream scoops. Seid was inspired by the success of a nearby Carvel shop, but set out to create flavors that would appeal to the Asian-American market. Early flavors offered included cherry vanilla, coffee brandy, lychee, papaya, red mango, and rocky road. The store struggled in its first decade, and was at times targeted by gangs, as Seid refused to pay them extortion money. In 2002, the business was taken over by Seid's daughter, Christina Seid, who remains the owner as of 2023.

In late 2018, the business opened a store in Flushing, named The Original Flushing Ice Cream Factory. The business opened a third location in the Essex Market on the Lower East Side, opening in 2019 following the market's relocation.

== Flavors ==
The Chinatown Ice Cream Factory is best known for their Asian-inspired flavors, which have included almond cookie, green tea, lychee, mango, pandan, red bean, taro, Thai tea, and ube. After Christina Seid took over the business in the early 2000s, she introduced new flavors such as black sesame, durian, egg custard, and 'zen butter', a sesame-based flavor. They also serve more typically American ice cream flavors, including chocolate, coffee, cookies and cream, mint chip, pistachio, rocky road, and vanilla.

The Flushing location also serves more Korean-inspired flavors.

In addition to ice cream, the business also sells ice cream cakes.
