= Cookie Puss =

Ice cream cake

Carvel’s Cookie Puss cake

Cookie Puss is an ice cream cake character created by Carvel in the United States in the 1970s as an expansion of its line of freshly made exclusive products, along with Hug Me the Bear and Fudgie the Whale. The cake is fashioned with a space alien that uses cookies for eyes and an ice cream cone for the nose. According to Carvel's backstory for the character, Cookie Puss is a space alien who was born on planet Birthday. His original name was "Celestial Person", but the initials "C.P." later came to stand for "Cookie Puss". In his television commercials, Cookie Puss has the ability to fly, though he requires a saucer-shaped spacecraft for interplanetary travel. During the 1980s, Cookie Puss was repurposed to serve as a cake for St. Patrick's Day, dubbed "Cookie O'Puss", which continues to be sold annually.

== Appearance ==
Since its introduction in 1972, the Cookie Puss design developed by Carvel corporate chef Andrew Bianchi has evolved into the version that is sold today. The initial design introduced the general pear shape of the cake, but all ornamentation was frosting applied by the stores. The first effort to achieve a consistent look was a face printed on a large cookie wafer using edible inks.

A group of franchisees led by Liam Gray of Schenectady, New York, rallied against the corporate requirement for stores to purchase the pre-printed wafers. Gray created a new variation using items already stocked in Carvel shops—sugar cones and Flying Saucer ice cream sandwiches. The other franchisees in the (now defunct) North East Carvel Franchisee Group followed suit, and by May 1974, the Carvel corporation had adopted this as the official design of the Cookie Puss product.

== In media ==
Cookie Puss was a frequent topic used for comic effect on The Howard Stern Show. Typically, the cast of the show would torment Fred Norris for having purchased Cookie Puss as a gift for his mother on Mother's Day. Howard Stern would use voice enhancements to impersonate the voice of Cookie Puss from the Carvel commercials, often excusing his inappropriate comments because he could "speak his mind, now that Tom Carvel is dead".

Cookie Puss was the focus of the Beastie Boys' debut single, "Cooky Puss". The song was inspired by a series of prank calls the group's members made to a Carvel location, in which they jokingly requested to speak to Cookie Puss.

It was also referred to by Kenneth Parcell in 30 Rock's "Reaganing" (Season 5, Episode 5), in which Jenna, Kenneth and Kelsey Grammer conspire to pull a short grift, then a long con on a Carvel store.

In one episode of the FOX series The Critic, "A Night at the Opera and a Day at the Races", the character Satoshi, Eater of Souls, holds up a Cookie Puss and declares, "Cookie Puss, I will eat your soul!"

In the FX series Archer, title character Sterling Archer refers to Cookie Puss and Fudgie the Whale in "Drift Problem" (Season 3, Episode 7), wondering aloud to himself if either will be present at the surprise birthday party he assumes is being held for him: "I wonder what the guys in the office have planned for my birthday. Wonder if Fudgie the Whale will be there or Cookie Puss. Cookie Puss. Those guys at Carvel know what they're doing". Additionally, in "Heart of Archness: Part 1" (Season 3, Episode 1), Ray Gillette moans "Cookie Puss" after he is informed there will be no Carvel.

In the Family Guy episode "Joe's Revenge", Joe is upset that the criminal who paralyzed him has escaped custody. In an attempt to cheer Joe up, Peter buys him a Cookie Puss cake.

== See also ==
- Fudgie the Whale
- Carvel
- Ice cream
