= Tom Carvel =

Greek-American businessman and entrepreneur

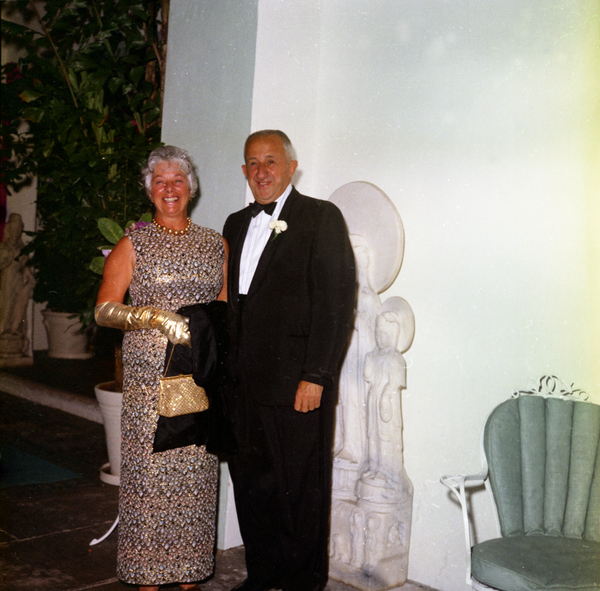
- Carvel and his wife Agnes in the 1980’s
- Born: Athanasios Thomas Karvelas (Greek: Ἀθανάσιος Καρβέλας); July 14, 1906; Athens, Greece
- Died: October 21, 1990 (aged 84); Pine Plains, New York, U.S.
- Citizenship: United States
- Known for: Founder of Carvel Ice Cream

Tom Carvel (born Athanasios Karvelas (Greek: Ἀθανάσιος Καρβέλας); July 14, 1906 – October 21, 1990) was a Greek-born American businessman and entrepreneur known for the invention and promotion of soft-serve ice cream in the northeastern United States. He was the founder of the Carvel brand and franchise.

== Early business career ==
Carvel began selling ice cream out of his truck in 1929 in Hartsdale, New York. On Memorial Day weekend in 1934, his truck had a flat tire, so he pulled into a parking lot next to a pottery store and began selling his melting ice cream to vacationers who were driving by. The owner of the store allowed Carvel to use electricity from his store. As such, Carvel opened his parked truck for ice cream sales. Within two days, he had sold his entire supply of ice cream and concluded that he could increase his profits by working from a fixed location.

== Carvel Brands franchising ==
In 1936, Carvel purchased the pottery store and converted it into a roadside ice cream stand; this permanently established Carvel as the first retailer to develop and market soft ice cream. The same year, he established the Carvel Brand Corporation and developed a secret soft-serve ice cream formula.

Carvel also developed new refrigeration machines and sold his designs. After World War II, he began to franchise his ice cream stores. Carvel was featured in his own advertisements as the company believed that his gravelly voice and personal charm were important factors in the success of his business.

The Carvel company specializes in ice cream cakes, often in the shapes of animals. Two of the most popular ice cream novelties introduced by the company have been "Fudgie the Whale" and "Cookie Puss". The brand continues to operate using a franchising model, primarily concentrated in the Northeast United States and Florida.

Carvel eventually developed the company into an international chain with more than 800 outlets in 17 states and six countries. In 1989, he sold the Carvel Corporation to Investcorp for more than $80 million.

== Death ==
Carvel died in Pine Plains, Dutchess County, New York, in 1990 and is buried with his wife Agnes in Ferncliff Cemetery in Hartsdale.

=== Controversy ===
In October 2009, Carvel's niece Pamela Carvel filed court papers to have Carvel's body exhumed and an autopsy performed, stating she suspected he was drugged or suffocated by employees whom Carvel suspected of embezzlement. Her petition was denied, and she later became a fugitive from justice in a personal bankruptcy case. She had been vying for control of his $67-million estate.
