= Captain Lawrence Brewing Company =

Craft brewery located in Elmsford, New York

Coordinates: 41°4′14″N 73°48′51″W

Captain Lawrence
- Interactive map of Captain Lawrence
- Location: 444 Saw Mill River Rd, Elmsford, New York 10523 USA
- Opened: 2005
- Annual production volume: 25,000 US beer barrels (29,000 hL)
- Owner: Scott Vaccaro
- Website: captainlawrencebrewing.com

Captain Lawrence Brewing Company is a craft brewery located in Elmsford, New York. The brewery is owned and run by head brewer Scott Vaccaro. Vaccaro, a homebrewer since 1995, trained in brewing science at UC Davis.

Many of Captain Lawrence's beers are strongly influenced by traditional Belgian ale styles, although often with an American twist. Barrel-aging and ales with sourness or flavors contributed by bacteria and wild yeasts such as Brettanomyces, are also part of their repertoire.

Like many small breweries, Captain Lawrence seeks to be environmentally sensitive, including donating its spent grain to a local farmer for use as cattle feed.

Their beers are fermented in stainless steel cylindro-conical vessels.

The brewery takes its name from Captain Lawrence Drive in South Salem, New York, the road on which Vaccaro's childhood home is located. The street is named after Samuel Lawrence (1733–1796), a captain in the Westchester County Militia, 3rd Regiment, during the American Revolution.

== History ==
Vaccaro brewed his first beer before he was legally allowed to drink. As a teenager in high school he saw a friend's father brewing beer at home, asked if he could participate, and was told it would be allowed with parental permission.

After enrolling at Villanova University to study accounting, Vaccaro realized his real desire was to become a professional brewer. He transferred to UC Davis and studied fermentation science. He interned at Adnams Brewery in the UK. Following graduation he worked at Sierra Nevada and the short-lived Colorado Brewery in Danbury, Connecticut.

Captain Lawrence Brewing Company was founded in 2006. Its first brewery was located on Castleton Street in Pleasantville, New York and had a 20-barrel system. After five years, needing more space to operate a bottling line and a larger system to increase capacity, the brewery was relocated to Elmsford, New York, approximately five miles from the original brewery. The new facility has a 40-barrel brewing system and more fermentation capacity. There is also a small seven-barrel system for experimental and specialty batches. The new brewery began operation in 2011. In February 2012, they opened a tasting room at the brewery in Elmsford. In 2014, they added a sour ale production wing to their brewery that they call the Fermento Funk Facility. They have nine oak foudres, five large rounds, and hundreds of wine barrels. The Elmsford brewery expanded to 33,000 square feet and opened a full service restaurant in May 2019.

In October 2020, Captain Lawrence opened the Mt Kisco Barrel House in Mount Kisco, NY. In addition to serving beer, this location is also used for barrel storage and blending of both beer and spirits.

== Beers ==
=== Year 'round brews ===
- Citra Dreams (7.0% ABV) - India Pale Ale with Citra hops. This smooth drinking North East hazy IPA bursts with orange, grapefruit and resin flavors.
- Hop Commander (6.5% ABV) - Classic West Coast India Pale Ale bursting with pine and citrus. Dry hopped with a combination of Pacific North West grown Citra, Centennial and Bravo hops.
- Freshchester (5.5% ABV) - Pale Ale brewed with Cascade hops from Segal Hop Ranch.
- Orbital Tilt (5.9% ABV) - A hazy India Pale Ale with a moderate alcohol content and a healthy dose of Mosaic hops for an intense aroma and flavor.
- Pacific Dawn (9.1% ABV) - A big India Pale Ale style with a high ABV. Brewed with Cascade, Centennial, and Mosaic hops.
- Classic Lager (4.2% ABV) - An ode to an American classic lager.
- Jam Juice (8.0% ABV) - A Galaxy hop bomb! A smooth body and moderate bitterness flow with tropical flavors and aromas of the Galaxy hop.
- Clearwater Kölsch (previously known as Captain's Kölsch) (5.5% ABV) - Kölsch, first brewed in Spring 2010

=== Seasonal and specialty offerings ===
- Fudgie the Beer (6.0% ABV) - a stout flavored with Carvel "chocolate crunchies" as found in their "Fudgie the Whale" dessert cake
- Frost Monster (11.0% ABV) - malty, intense ale, available aged in rum barrels
- Xtra Gold (10.0% ABV) - strong golden ale in the Belgian Abbey Tripel style, but flavored with American hop varieties including Amarillo
- Golden Delicious (10.0%+ ABV) - American Tripel, aged in oak apple brandy barrels
- Imperial Smoked Porter (12.0% ABV) - strong porter made with German smoked malt
- Smoke from the Oak (ABV not listed) - strong smoked porter that has been released in several different barrel-aged versions
- Nor'easter Winter Warmer (11.0% ABV) - strong dark ale in the Belgian tradition, flavored with elderberries
- St. Vincent's Dubbel (8.0% ABV) - richly flavored malty brown ale in the Belgian Abbey Dubbel style
- Liquid Gold (6.5% ABV) - Belgian style Blonde Ale, made with Belgian ale yeast and coriander
- Brown Bird Ale (4.8% ABV) - American Brown Ale
- Smoked Porter (8.0% ABV) - American porter made with German smoked malt
- Cuvée De Castleton (8.0% ABV) - American "wild ale", fermented with Muscat grapes and Brettanomyces (GABF Gold Medal Winner for American-Style Sour Ale in 2007)
- Rosso e Marrone (ABV not listed) - American sour ale, fermented with grapes and aged in oak barrels; "Rosso e Marrone" is Italian for "Red and Brown"; BeerAdvocate lists this beer as a Flanders Oud Bruin
- Birra DeCicco (6.0% ABV) - described on the label as a "malt beverage brewed with chestnut honey and jam"; this limited release was a collaboration with DeCicco & Sons, a family grocery chain in Westchester County, New York that has an extensive selection of craft and microbrew beers
- Pumpkin Ale (5.5% ABV) - amber ale, brewed with pumpkin and pumpkin spices
- Espresso Stout - stout, brewed with espresso coffee
- Five Years Later (10.0% ABV) - brewed to celebrate the brewery's fifth anniversary, a strong almost-black ale brewed with five varieties of malt and five different hops
- Winter Rye (5.0% ABV) - a one-time beer brewed using organic rye and crystal malt from Valley Malting Co in Massachusetts; brewed with a German yeast strain and lightly dry hopped with US Goldings
- Katchkie Harvest Ale - collaboration between Captain Lawrence Brewery, Executive Chef Robb Garceau of Great Performances and Katchkie Farm; Captain Lawrence Brewery's first farm-to-table beer offering

== See also ==
- Barrel-aged beer
- Craft Beer
