= Ferncliff Cemetery =

Cemetery in Westchester County, New York

Coordinates: 41°01′39″N 73°49′56″W

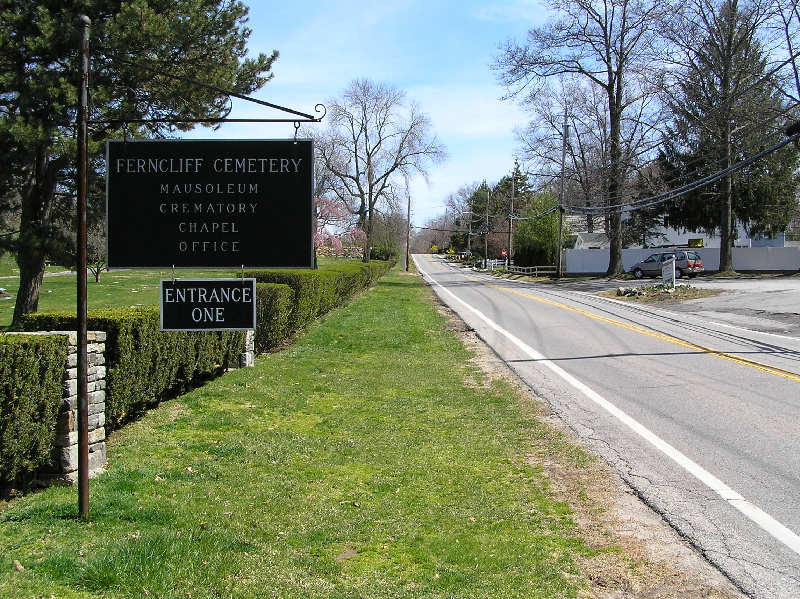
- Secor Road outside Ferncliff Cemetery in Hartsdale, New York
- Interactive map of Ferncliff Cemetery

Details
- Established: 1902; 124 years ago
- Location: Hartsdale, New York, US
- Country: United States
- No. of graves: >48,000
- Website: Ferncliff Cemetery Association
- Find a Grave: Ferncliff Cemetery

Ferncliff Cemetery and Mausoleum is a cemetery in Hartsdale, New York, United States, about 25 miles (40 km) north of Midtown Manhattan. It was founded in 1902, and is non-sectarian. Ferncliff has columbariums, a crematory, a small chapel, and a main office located in the rear of the main building.

== Mausoleums ==
Ferncliff Mausoleum in the cemetery

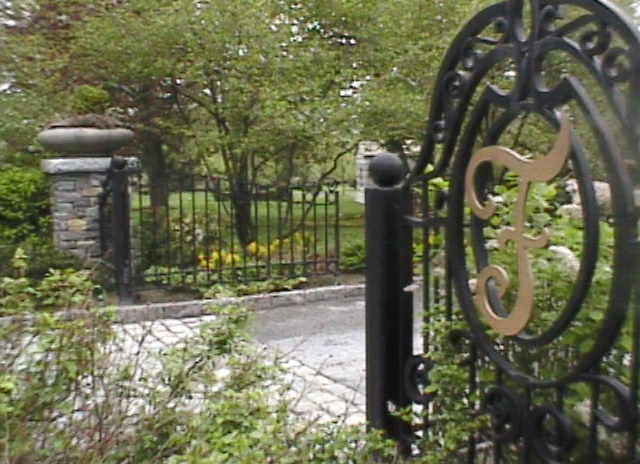
The main gates to the cemetery

Ferncliff Cemetery has three community mausoleums that offer what The New York Times has described as "lavish burial spaces". This cemetery includes columbariums. As of 2001, a standard crypt space in the mausoleums was priced at $15,000. The highest-priced spaces were private burial rooms with bronze gates, crystal chandeliers, and stained-glass windows, priced at $280,000.

=== Ferncliff ===
The Ferncliff Mausoleum, aka "The Cathedral of Memories", is the cemetery's oldest mausoleum, constructed in 1928. It has classic architecture, but the corridors are dark without glass panes to admit natural light. Ed Sullivan and Joan Crawford are two of the most famous interments in the main mausoleum. Judy Garland was interred here from her death in 1969 until 2017 when her family moved her remains to Hollywood Forever Cemetery in Los Angeles, California.

=== Shrine of Memories ===
The Shrine of Memories is Ferncliff's second mausoleum and was constructed in 1956. "Shrine of Memories" is a more contemporary structure than "Ferncliff Mausoleum". It has many panes of glass to admit natural light, and there is a painting of Christopher Columbus in the main hall of the building. Basil Rathbone is one of the most famous interments in "Shrine of Memories".

=== Rosewood ===
Rosewood is Ferncliff's most recently completed community mausoleum, having been constructed in 1999. Joseph J. Mangan was the architect of Rosewood. Singer Aaliyah and her father Michael Haughton have a private room in Rosewood. Cab Calloway is interred with his wife Zulme "Nuffie".

== Ground burials ==
The cemetery is also known for its in-ground burials in sections located in front of the mausoleums. Ferncliff does not permit upright headstones in its outdoor plots. All outdoor grave markers are flush with the ground. This feature facilitates maintenance of the cemetery grounds. However, there are several upright headstones that were placed before this policy was instituted. Malcolm X and the most famous ground burials, in plot Pinewood B.

== Notable burials ==
- Aaliyah (1979–2001), singer, actress, model, dancer; her father Michael Haughton (1951–2012), lies above her
- Arthur W. Aleshire (1900–1940), congressman
- Paul Althouse (1889–1954), opera singer
- Diane Arbus (1923–1971), American photographer
- Harold Arlen (1905–1986), composer
- Tommy Armour (1895–1968), Hall of Fame professional golfer
- José Asensio Torrado (1892-1961), general of the Republican Army of Spain
- Leopold Auer (1845–1930), violinist
- Arleen Auger (1939–1993), opera singer
- Albert E. Austin (1877–1953), U.S. Congressman from Connecticut
- Arthur Baer (1886–1969), journalist
- Aline Bernstein (1882–1955), set & costume designer, Tony Winner, and lover, patron, and muse of novelist Thomas Wolfe
- James Baldwin (1924–1987), novelist, essayist
- Richard Barthelmess (1895–1963), actor
- Béla Bartók (1881–1945), composer, pianist, scholar (remains were exhumed and moved to Budapest in 1988)
- Charles A. Beard (1874–1948), educator, historian
- Mary Ritter Beard (1867–1958), historian
- Ouida Bergère (1886–1974), actress and screenwriter
- Joseph P. Bickerton Jr. (1878–1936), attorney, theatrical producer
- Sherman Billingsley (1900–1966), restaurateur, owner of Stork Club
- Ray Bloch (1902–1982), composer, songwriter and arranger
- Clint Blume (1898–1973), baseball player
- Ballington Booth (1857–1940), social reformer (Volunteers of America)
- Maud Booth (1865–1948), co-founder of Volunteers of America
- Irène Bordoni (1895–1953), actress, singer
- Connee Boswell (1907–1976), singer
- Peaches Browning (1910–1956), actress
- John Brownlee (1900–1969), Australian baritone
- Adolph Caesar (1933–1986), actor
- Cab Calloway (1907–1994), musician
- Northern Calloway (1948–1990), actor
- Anthony Campagna (1884–1969), real estate developer
- Salvatore Cardillo (1880–1947), composer
- Hattie Carnegie (1880–1956), fashion designer
- Thomas Carvel (1906–1990), founder of Carvel Ice Cream
- Boris Chaliapin (1904–1979), artist, portrait painter, the son of Russian opera singer Feodor Chaliapin, brother of actor Feodor Chaliapin Jr.
- Mady Christians (1900–1951), actress
- Michael "Trigger Mike" Coppola (1900–1966), Mafioso
- Alexander Cores (1900–1994), violinist, Dorian String Quartet
- Joan Crawford (c. 1905–1977), actress
- Ossie Davis (1917–2005), actor
- Lya De Putti (1897–1931), actress
- Ruby Dee (1922–2014) actress
- Jack Donahue (1888–1930), actor and dancer
- O. L. Duke (1953–2004), actor
- Charles Evans (1926–2007), business leader, older brother of Robert
- Robert Evans (1930–2019), film producer
- Mid'hat Bey Frashëri (1880–1949), Albanian diplomat, writer, politician (reburied at Tirana, Albania, 2018)
- Lew Fields (1867–1941), actor and comedian
- John Flanagan (1865–1952), American sculptor
- Michel Fokine (1880–1942), choreographer
- Donald Foster (1889–1969), actor
- Lemuel L. Foster (1891–1981) civil servant, community leader
- Nahan Franko (1861–1930), musician
- Anis Fuleihan (1900–1970), musician
- Betty Furness (1916–1994), actress, consumer advocate, and commentator
- Jane Gail (1890–1962), actress
- Maria Gay (1879–1943), Catalan opera singer
- Lawrence Otis Graham (1961–2021), lawyer and author
- Minnie Gentry (1915–1993), actress
- Ernst Gräfenberg (1881-1957), physician and namesake for the g-spot
- Johnny Gunther (1929–1947), son of John Gunther and subject of Death Be Not Proud
- Oscar Hammerstein II (1895–1960), librettist
- Annette Hanshaw (1901–1985), singer
- Renee Harris (1876–1969), theatre producer
- Moss Hart (1904–1961), playwright and director
- Kitty Carlisle Hart (1910–2007), actress and singer
- Irene Hayes (1896–1975), businesswoman; founded Irene Hayes Wadley & Smythe and Gallagher's Steakhouse
- Hans Heinsheimer (1900–1993), music publisher, author, journalist
- Robert Holland (1940–2021), business executive
- Karen Horney (1885–1952), psychiatrist
- Alberta Hunter (1895–1984), singer and songwriter
- Jam Master Jay (1965–2002), DJ for Run-DMC
- Jerome Kern (1885–1945), composer
- Juliana Young Koo (1905–2017), American-Chinese diplomat
- Wellington Koo (1888–1985), diplomat, statesman; Ambassador of Republic of China
- Vincent W. Lanna (1925–2010), US Army major general
- Alan Jay Lerner (1918–1986), composer and playwright
- Avon Long (1910–1984), actor, singer, and dancer
- Marion Lorne (1883–1968), actress
- James Male (c. 1896–1947), lawyer and member of the New York State Assembly
- Moms Mabley (1894–1975), comedian
- Michael Malloy (1873–1933), murder victim
- Hugh Marlowe (1911–1982), actor
- Elsa Maxwell (1883–1963), columnist, society figure
- Jeffrey Miller (1950–1970), victim of the Kent State shootings and subject of John Filo's iconic photo of the event
- Lucky Millinder (1910–1966), swing and rhythm-and-blues bandleader
- Ludwig von Mises (1881–1973), economist and philosopher
- Thelonious Monk (1917–1982), musician
- Khalid Abdul Muhammad (1948–2001), black nationalist and separatist
- Ona Munson (1903–1955), actress
- Dwight Arrington "Heavy D" Myers (1967–2011), rapper and actor
- Nat Nakasa (1937–1965), South African writer; his remains were repatriated to South Africa on August 19, 2014 for reburial at Chesterville, Durban, South Africa, in September 2014
- Dagmar Nordstrom (1903–1976), pianist, composer, one of the Nordstrom Sisters
- Frederick O'Neal (1905–1992), actor
- William Oberhardt (1882–1958), artist, portrait painter, illustrator, sculptor
- Joseph Pilates (1883-1967), physical trainer, writer, and inventor; developer of Pilates method
- David M. Potts (1906–1976), U.S. Congressman, House of Rep. (NY)
- Leopold Prince (1880–1951), lawyer, New York State Assemblyman, judge, conductor
- Anne Eisner Putnam (1911–1967), painter
- Otto Rank (1884–1939), psychiatrist
- Vincenzo Rao (1898–1988), Lucchese crime family mobster
- Connie Rasinski (1907–1965), animator
- Basil Rathbone (1892–1967), actor
- Sharon Redd (1945–1992), singer
- Dana Reeve (1961-2006), actress, singer, activist
- Charles Revson (1906–1975), founder of Revlon Cosmetics
- Peter Revson (1939–1974), racecar driver
- Paul Robeson (1898–1976), actor, singer, and civil rights activist
- Gene Rodemich (1890–1934), pianist and bandleader
- Arsenio Rodríguez (1911–1970), Cuban composer and bandleader
- Sigmund Romberg (1887–1951), composer
- Jerry Ross (1926–1955), songwriter
- Diana Sands (1934–1973), actress
- Friedrich Schorr (1888–1953), opera singer
- Gerlando Sciascia (1934–1999), Bonanno crime family caporegime, Rizzuto clan caporegime
- Malik Sealy (1970–2000), NBA guard (Minnesota Timberwolves)
- Betty Shabazz (1936–1997), philosopher; wife of Malcolm X
- Malcolm Shabazz (1984–2013), grandson of Malcolm X
- Toots Shor (1903–1977), restaurateur
- Leo Sirota (1885–1965), pianist, teacher, and conductor
- Otto Soglow (1900–1975), author and cartoonist (The New Yorker)
- Daisy Allen Story (1858–1932), ninth President General of the Daughters of the American Revolution
- Zhang Youyi (1900–1988), first wife of Chinese poet Xu Zhimo
- H. H. Kung (1880–1967), Chinese financier and politician; husband of Soong Ai-ling.
- Soong Ai-ling (1889–1973), eldest of the Soong sisters
- Soong Mei-ling (1898–2003), First Lady of the Republic of China
- T. V. Soong (1894–1971), financier and diplomat; brother of the Soong sisters
- Alfred Steele (1901–1959), board chairman of Pepsi, married to Joan Crawford
- Preston Sturges (1898–1959), writer and director
- Ed Sullivan (1901–1974), columnist and television host
- Anya Taranda (1915–1970), model and showgirl
- Diana Trilling (1905–1996), author and literary critic
- Lionel Trilling (1905–1975), literary critic
- Judy Tyler (1932–1957), actress
- Lenore Ulric (1892–1970), actress
- Myrtle Vail (1888–1978), actress
- Raymond Walburn (1887–1969), actor
- David Warfield (1866–1951), actor
- Cornell Woolrich (1903–1968), author, screenwriter
- Malcolm X (El-Hajj Malik El-Shabazz; born Malcolm Little, 1925–1965), human rights leader
- Hilda Yen (1904–1970), Chinese American society figure, aviator and diplomat
- Joe Young (1889–1939), composer
- Whitney Young (1921–1971), social reformer (National Urban League)
- Josefa Zaratt (1871–1962), Puerto Rican doctor

== Cremations ==
Ferncliff Cemetery has the only crematory in Westchester County, New York, and performs approximately 10% of the cremations in New York state. Because of local ordinances, no additional crematories can be constructed in Westchester County.

People whose remains were cremated and inurned at Ferncliff, but whose ashes were taken somewhere else include:

- Alan Freed (1921–1965), radio DJ known as "The Father of Rock & Roll". His ashes were moved to the Rock and Roll Hall of Fame in 2002.
- Jim Henson (1936–1990), Muppets creator. His ashes were sprinkled at his Santa Fe, New Mexico, ranch.
- John Lennon (1940–1980), singer and songwriter (The Beatles)
- Christopher Reeve (1952–2004), actor (cremated only)
- Nelson Rockefeller (1908–1979), Governor of New York and Vice President of the United States. His ashes were sprinkled on his estate.
- Nikola Tesla (1856–1943), scientist of electrotechnics. His ashes were placed in the Nikola Tesla Museum, Belgrade.

== See also ==
- List of cemeteries in the United States
