= Reaganing =

- 30 Rock episode
- Episode no.: Season 5 Episode 5
- Directed by: Todd Holland
- Written by: Matt Hubbard
- Production code: 505
- Original air date: October 21, 2010

Guest appearances
- Kelsey Grammer as himself; Seth Kirschner as Shawn; Jen Ponton as a Carvel employee

Episode chronology
| ← Previous "Live Show" | Next → "Gentleman's Intermission" |
- 30 Rock season 5

"Reaganing" is the fifth episode of the fifth season of the American television comedy series 30 Rock, and the 85th overall episode of the series. It was written by co-executive producer Matt Hubbard and directed by Todd Holland. It originally aired on NBC in the United States on October 21, 2010. Guest stars in this episode include Kelsey Grammer, Seth Kirschner, and Jen Ponton.

In the episode, Jack Donaghy (Alec Baldwin) is succeeding at all of his tasks, and as a result of having a good day, as he is on a roll, he decides to help Liz Lemon (Tina Fey) figure out her relationship status with Carol (Matt Damon). Meanwhile, Jenna Maroney (Jane Krakowski) and Kenneth Parcell (Jack McBrayer) enlist the help of actor Kelsey Grammer to help them pull off a scam, and Tracy Jordan (Tracy Morgan) tries to film a commercial for the Boys & Girls Clubs of America.

"Reaganing" was generally, though not universally, well received among television critics. According to Nielsen Media Research, the episode was watched by 5.182 million households during its original broadcast, and received a 2.2 rating/7 share among viewers in the 18–49 demographic. For his work in this episode, Matt Hubbard received a Primetime Emmy Award nomination in the category for Outstanding Writing in a Comedy Series.

== Plot ==
Jack Donaghy (Alec Baldwin) agrees to give sketch show TGS with Tracy Jordan head writer Liz Lemon (Tina Fey) a ride to Newark Liberty International Airport to meet her boyfriend Carol (Matt Damon). On the way, she tells him that she is having intimacy issues with Carol and wants to end the relationship. Jack, who is having a successful run of problem-solving, encourages Liz to confide in him so that he can help solve her problem. She tells him about a traumatic incident from her childhood. During this incident, Liz was preparing to use the bathroom while wearing roller skates. She pulled down her underpants and fell, pulling a Tom Jones poster on top of her. Her mother (Anita Gillette) discovered Liz under the poster and suspected her of masturbating, so she took all her posters away. With their limousine stuck in traffic, Jack exits the vehicle to try and digest Liz's story.

At the same time, TGS star Tracy Jordan (Tracy Morgan) tries to film a commercial for the Boys & Girls Clubs of America but has a difficult time remembering his line resulting in production holding traffic up as the commercial shoot is blocking off a street. Jack comes upon the scene and realizes the problem. To speed things up, he gives Tracy jelly beans to eat and while he is chewing, Jack imitates Tracy's voice and says the line Tracy was scheduled to say.

Back in the car, Jack begins to lose confidence in his problem-solving abilities because Liz still wants to break up with Carol. As they talk through Liz's past problems with sex, they realize that they are all connected to the incident with the Tom Jones poster and that each time she has had a problem, it is because she has been reminded of the singer. Liz is relieved that she has found the root of her problem and Jack convinces her to stay with Carol. When they finally reach Newark Airport, Liz realizes that she is supposed to meet him at John F. Kennedy International Airport instead.

Meanwhile, TGS star Jenna Maroney (Jane Krakowski) receives a card from Carvel that entitles her to free ice cream cakes for life. She gets a free cake with the card, but the name "Jenny" rather than "Jenna" is on the decorated cake so NBC page Kenneth Parcell (Jack McBrayer) returns it to the store. When he gets a refund for the free cake, Jenna decides to scam the restaurant. With Kenneth's help, she orders several more cakes and gets refunds for them. Eventually Jenna is banned from Carvel. The two then enlist actor Kelsey Grammer to assist them in a bigger scam. Jenna and Kenneth submit a sketch to TGS producer Pete Hornberger (Scott Adsit) in Liz's name that requires dozens of cakes. Grammer orders the cakes and later gets refunds for all of them. The gang has now collected money from both TGS and Carvel for 21 free cakes, a windfall of nearly 800 dollars. Kenneth runs into one of the Carvel employees (Jen Ponton) and learns that she was fired because of the scam. Realizing the negative effect of their actions, Kenneth decides not to take part in the scams anymore.

== Production ==
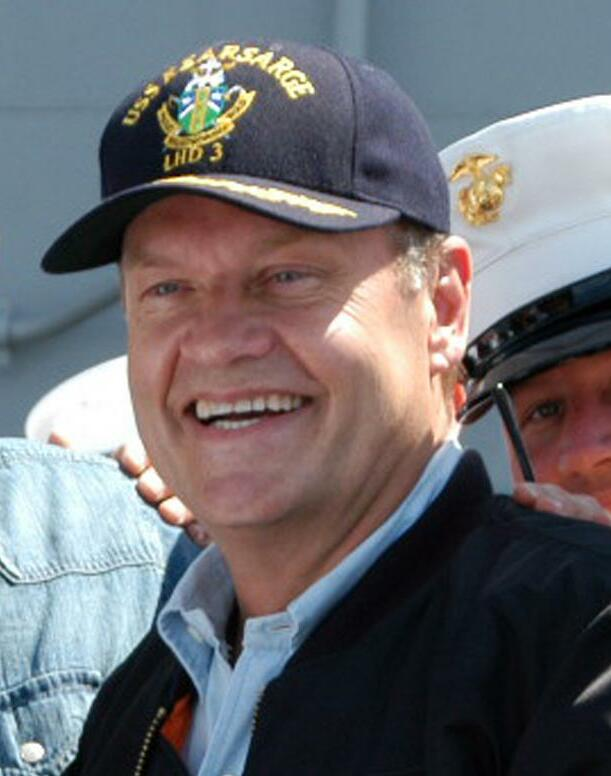
Kelsey Grammer guest starred as himself in this episode.

"Reaganing" was written by co-executive producer Matt Hubbard, his first episode for the fifth season, and his eleventh writing credit after "The Rural Juror", "Hard Ball", "The Collection", "MILF Island", "Reunion", "Larry King", "Cutbacks", "Audition Day", "Anna Howard Shaw Day", and "Emanuelle Goes to Dinosaur Land". The episode was directed by Todd Holland, making it his second for the series after directing the February 5, 2009, episode "Generalissimo" from the show's third season. This episode of 30 Rock originally aired in the United States on October 21, 2010, on NBC as the fifth episode of the show's fifth season and the 85th overall episode of the series. "Reaganing" was filmed on September 14, and September 20, 2010.

Co-showrunner and executive producer Robert Carlock said that the upcoming season would address Liz Lemon's sexual problems, explaining that "[we] finally get to the bottom of where [her] sextual [sic] dysfunction comes from." In this episode, it is revealed that Liz's problem stems from an incident from her childhood involving a poster of singer Tom Jones. Actor Kelsey Grammer played himself in "Reaganing" in which he helps Jenna Maroney and Kenneth Parcell scam Carvel, an ice cream franchise. Following the broadcast, Carvel thanked the show for referencing them in the episode despite making them "the butt of the joke." In addition, Carvel enjoyed the subplot scheme, noting it "was pretty funny stuff!"

This was actor Seth Kirschner's third appearance as the character Shawn, a film and television director. In the episode, Shawn is the director of the Boys & Girls Clubs of America commercial and gets frustrated with Tracy Jordan when Tracy cannot remember his line during the shoot. Kirschner previously appeared in two season four episodes "Into the Crevasse" and "Emanuelle Goes to Dinosaur Land". Jen Ponton, who plays a Carvel employee who gets fired, said that the cast and crew of 30 Rock were "wonderful to work with. Everyone was absolutely top-notch. The whole crew was very professional. They treated me very well". Ponton auditioned for her role in September and got the job within a few days.

== Cultural references ==
Kenneth says that if Cookie Puss (pictured) were to learn of Jenna's plan to scheme Carvel the cake would "tear us apart with his fangs."

In the beginning of the episode, Jack tells Liz that he has entered "a magic zone of error-free living" which he calls "Reaganing"—named after former United States President Ronald Reagan—and that the only people to accomplish this besides Reagan have been businessman Lee Iacocca, former General Electric Chairman and CEO Jack Welch, and former President of Iraq Saddam Hussein. Tracy tells Kenneth that he turned down the opportunity to host the MTV International Awards to film a commercial for the Boys & Girls Clubs of America instead. As a result of her participation in the Macy's Thanksgiving Day Parade, Jenna is given a card from Carvel that entitles her to free ice cream cakes for life in which she and Kenneth decide to abuse the card which results in Jenna being banned from Carvel for life. This subplot was a reference to Dina Lohan, the mother of actress Lindsay Lohan, who abused her daughter's Carvel card and as a result she was banned from ever using the card.

Liz says that after her mother found her under a Tom Jones poster with her underpants around her ankles her mother removed all her posters from her room which included Grizzly Adams, Larry Wilcox as his television character Officer Jon Baker from CHiPs, Harrison Ford as Han Solo from Star Wars, Philadelphia Phillies players Tug McGraw and Mike Schmidt, Kermit the Frog, and Gunther Gebel-Williams.

After learning of Jenna's scheme to con Carvel, Kenneth says that it is wrong and illegal, and says that if Cookie Puss knew about this "he'd tear us apart with his fangs." This is a reference to Cookie Puss, an ice cream cake character created by Carvel in the 1970s. A television commentator opined that the Carvel storyline here referenced the 1973 caper film The Sting that starred Paul Newman and Robert Redford as two professional grifters who decide to con a mob boss played by Robert Shaw. In addition, after ordering the cakes with mistakes on them at a Carvel location, Grammer touches his nose as a sign to Jenna and Kenneth, who are outside, that he has ordered them, a similar gesture that Newman did in the film.

== Reception ==
According to Nielsen Media Research, "Reaganing" was watched by 5.182 million households in its original American broadcast. It earned a 2.2 rating/7 share in the 18–49 demographic. This means that it was seen by 2.9 percent of all 18- to 49-year-olds, and 7 percent of all 18- to 49-year-olds watching television at the time of the broadcast. The episode constituted a 30 percent drop in viewership from the previous week's episode, "Live Show", which was watched by 6.701 million American viewers. Matt Hubbard received a Primetime Emmy Award nomination for Outstanding Writing in a Comedy Series at the 63rd Primetime Emmy Awards.

Television columnist Alan Sepinwall for HitFix reported that despite "Reaganing" not being a perfect episode it was still "a very good one in what's so far ... been a very strong rebound season for 30 Rock." Juli Weiner of Vanity Fair wrote, "the episode was quick, sharp, and consistent". Meredith Blake of the Los Angeles Times enjoyed Tracy's plot here, noting that his attempts to deliver a single line was highly entertaining. Johnny Firecloud of CraveOnline deemed "Reaganing" an excellent episode from the series. Nathan Rabin of The A.V. Club was positive about Jenna and Kenneth's story, noting it went from amusing to hilarious. He was not "overly blown away" with Liz's plot, but said it redeemed itself at the end "by providing another nice moment of connection" between the Jack and Liz characters. Rabin gave "Reaganing" a B+ grade, praising the (non-existent) scene where Jack put pills into Tracy's jelly beans. Samantha Urban of The Dallas Morning News said that the best part of the episode was Jack McBrayer's Kenneth "actually [having] some funny lines for the first time in awhile [sic]." The Fordham Ram's Celeste Kmiotek said that the episode was "perhaps more awkward than normal ... but it was nonetheless hilarious, and was tempered by its ability to throw cultural references into everything until you almost forget what is actually being discussed." Entertainment Weekly contributor Annie Barrett liked Kelsey Grammer's appearance, but mostly enjoyed the fact that 30 Rock devoted an episode to Tina Fey's character as "the sexual equivalent of a million Hindenburgs" and was pleased with the numerous Liz flashbacks from past episodes that were featured here.

Not all reviews were positive. Bob Sassone of AOL's TV Squad reported that this episode was an odd one produced by the show. "I don't know if it was the off-balance tone the episode had because two of the three plots took place outside, but it just wasn't as good as most episodes."
