= Greenburgh Central School District =

School district in the U.S. state of New York

Greenburgh Central School District (GCSD) is a school district headquartered in Hartsdale, New York.

== History ==
In 2014, Ronald O. Ross was the superintendent. Gary Stern of The Journal News wrote that Ross "has a history of stepping on toes while improving students' performance." That year was put on paid leave, after district staff filed a lawsuit in federal court in regards to conduct they alleged Ross had done. Four months after the paid leave decision, the board terminated him.

== Schools ==
- Woodlands Middle/High School (grades 7–12)
- Richard J. Bailey Elementary School (grades 4–6)
- Highview Elementary School (grades 2 and 3)
- Lee F. Jackson Elementary School (kindergarten and grade 1)
- Early Childhood Program (Pre-K)
