= Hartsdale, New York =

Hamlet in the town of Greenburgh, New York, United States

- Town
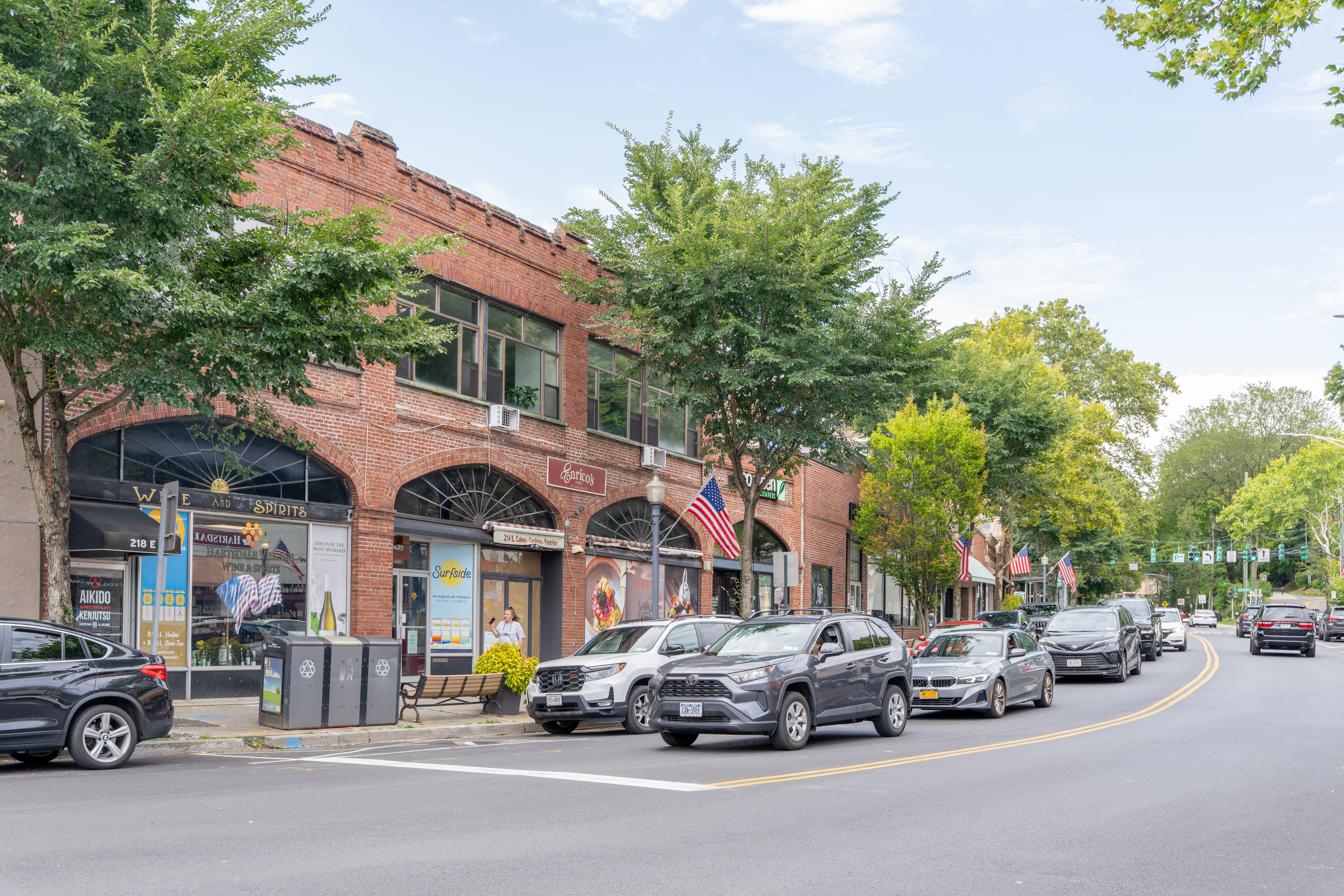

- Location of Hartsdale, New York
- Coordinates: 41°2′N 73°48′W
- Country: United States
- State: New York
- County: Westchester
- Town: Greenburgh

Area
  - Total: 0.85 sq mi (2.20 km^{2})
  - Land: 0.85 sq mi (2.20 km^{2})
  - Water: 0 sq mi (0.00 km^{2})
- Elevation: 184 ft (56 m)

Population (2020)
  - Total: 3,377
  - Density: 3,980.2/sq mi (1,536.75/km^{2})
- Time zone: UTC−5 (Eastern (EST))
  - Summer (DST): UTC−4 (EDT)
- ZIP Code: 10530
- Area code: 914
- FIPS code: 36-32523
- GNIS feature ID: 0952312

Hartsdale is a hamlet located in the town of Greenburgh, Westchester County, New York, United States. The population was 5,293 at the 2010 census. It is a suburb of New York City.

== History ==
Hartsdale, a CDP/hamlet/post-office in the town of Greenburgh, New York, lies on the Bronx River 20 miles (32 km) north of New York City. It is served by the Metro-North Harlem River commuter rail line into Grand Central Terminal. Hartsdale is the home of America's first canine pet cemetery (started by veterinarian Samuel Johnson in 1896), and the world's first Carvel Ice Cream store (1934), which closed in 2008.

=== Pre-Colonial Period ===
Hartsdale's earliest known settlers were the Wecquaesgeek (sometimes spelled Weckquaesgeek), a band of the Wappinger people, an Algonquian tribe.

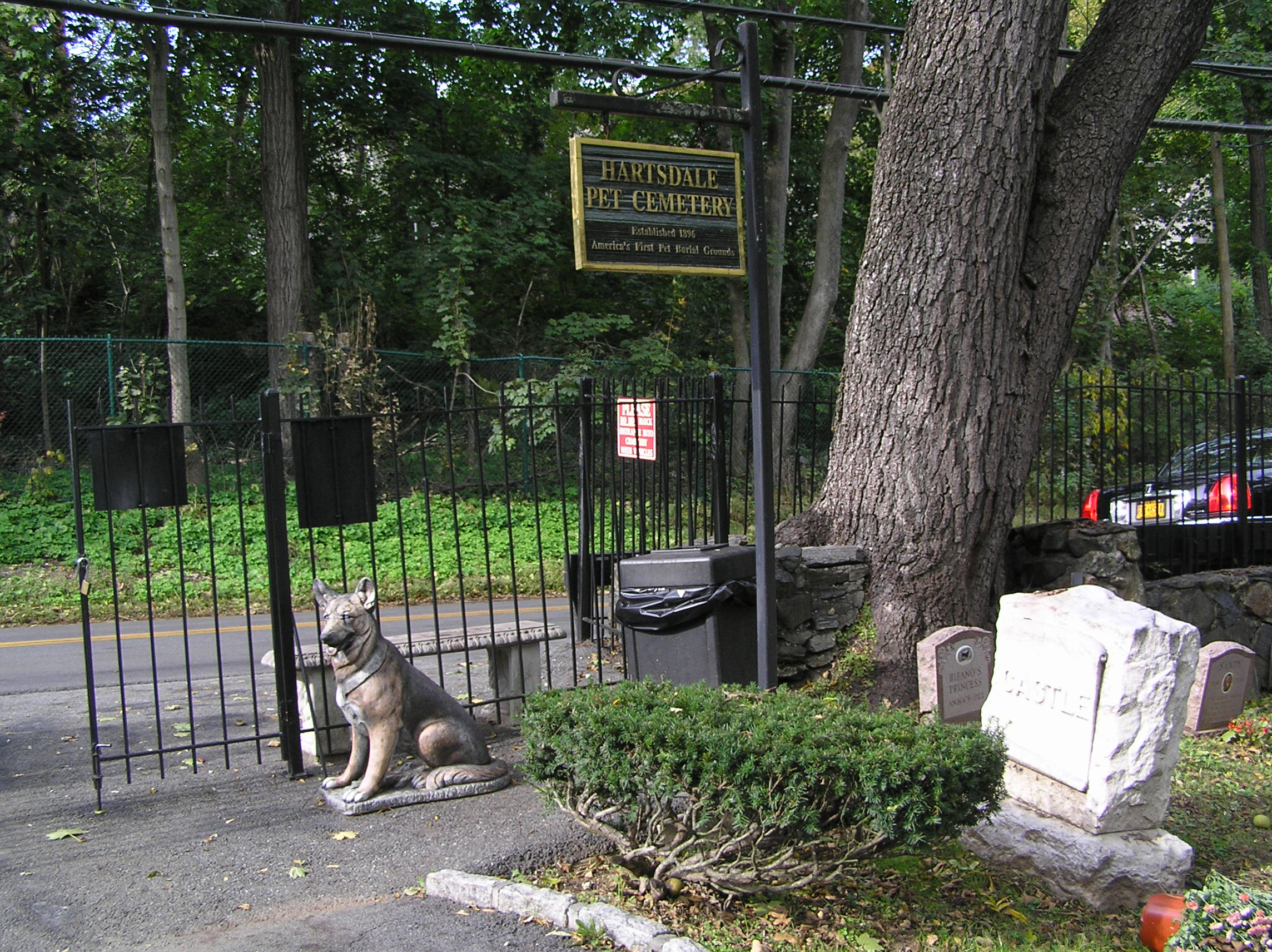
Hartsdale Pet Cemetery

=== Colonial Era and American Revolution ===
After British settlers arrived, the area was developed under the manor system when Frederick Philipse, a Dutch merchant and British Loyalist, was granted the land by the British government. As lord of his Philipse Manor, he leased his land to tenant farmers.

On October 28, 1776, a battle was fought alongside the Bronx River, near the site of the current Hartsdale train station. The Odell House (on Ridge Road, built in 1732) served as the headquarters for the French general the Comte de Rochambeau.

=== 19th Century ===
The area remained largely agrarian until 1865, when Eleazar Hart deeded land for the development of the New York and Harlem Railroad line into Manhattan, setting the stage for Hartsdale's change into a more cosmopolitan commuter village. Between 1880 and 1940, large tracts of farmland and estates were subdivided and converted into private houses and apartments at a furious pace.

=== 20th Century ===
In 1904, the German banker Felix M. Warburg (1871–1937) purchased large tracts of land to build his 500-acre (2.0 km^{2}) "Woodlands" estate in Hartsdale.

In 1932, Henry Jacques Gaisman, inventor and founder of the Gillette safety razor blade, purchased 136 acres (0.55 km^{2}) of land along Ridge Road which he sold in 1952 to the New York Archdiocese for $600,000. In 1999 the estate was sold to the Town of Greenburgh which reopened it as the Hart's Brook Nature Preserve.

In 1936 Greek immigrant and ice cream salesman Tom Carvel opened the world's first Carvel ice cream store in Hartsdale.

== Geography ==
Hartsdale has several parks, including the 25-acre (100,000 m^{2}) Secor Woods Park, the 170-acre (0.69 km^{2}) Ridge Road Park, and 86-acre (350,000 m^{2}) Rumbrook Park.

Some notable people are buried in Ferncliff Cemetery on Secor Road in Hartsdale.

The Hartsdale Railroad Station was listed on the National Register of Historic Places in 2011, as was the Evangeline Booth House in Hartsdale hamlet.

According to the United States Census Bureau, the community has a total area of 0.9 square miles (2.3 km^{2}), all land.

== Demographics ==
Historical population
Census	Pop.	Note	%±
2020	3,377		—
U.S. Decennial Census

As of the census of 2000, there were 9,830 people, 4,314 households, and 2,756 families residing in the community. The population density was 3,068.0 inhabitants per square mile (1,184.6/km^{2}). There were 4,478 housing units at an average density of 1,397.6 per square mile (539.6/km^{2}). The racial makeup of the community was 76.14% White, 8.71% African American, 0.19% Native American, 10.17% Asian, 0.04% Pacific Islander, 2.64% from other races, and 2.10% from two or more races. Hispanic or Latino of any race were 9.55% of the population.

There were 4,314 households, out of which 24.3% had children under the age of 18 living with them, 53.1% were married couples living together, 8.6% had a female householder with no husband present, and 36.1% were non-families. 31.8% of all households were made up of individuals, and 12.7% had someone living alone who was 65 years of age or older. The average household size was 2.27 and the average family size was 2.86.

In the CDP the population was spread out, with 18.2% under the age of 18, 4.8% from 18 to 24, 30.3% from 25 to 44, 28.8% from 45 to 64, and 17.9% who were 65 years of age or older. The median age was 43 years. For every 100 females there were 86.2 males. For every 100 females age 18 and over, there were 81.2 males.

The median income for a household in the community was $81,824, and the median income for a family was $100,330. Males had a median income of $62,362 versus $47,380 for females. The per capita income for the community was $45,691. About 1.6% of families and 2.6% of the population were below the poverty line, including 1.5% of those under age 18 and 4.6% of those age 65 or over.

As of 1991 Hartsdale has a sizable Japanese American community.

== Education ==
The census-designated place is divided between Greenburgh Central School District and Edgemont Union Free School District.

== Notable people ==
- Peter Riegert, actor
- Billy Vera, singer/musician/composer
- Arleen Auger, soprano
- Mary Ritter Beard, women's history archivist
- Evangeline Cory Booth, Salvation Army leader
- Sean Casten, Illinois Democratic Congressman
- Louis Diat, famous chef and inventor of vichyssoise
- Mike "SuperJew" Epstein, Major League Baseball player
- Michael d'Orlando, racing driver
- Nicholas d'Orlando, racing driver
- Jack Davis, Mad magazine artist
- Malvina Hoffman, artist/sculptor
- Louis J. Ignarro, Nobel laureate
- Morris E. Lasker, US federal judge
- Charles Wellford Leavitt, landscape architect, urban planner, and civil engineer
- Tom Carvel, inventor of soft serve ice cream and Carvel ice cream

== In popular culture ==
The popular J-pop rap/R&B duo Heartsdales borrow their name from Hartsdale, as the two members spent considerable time here.

On the NBC series Heroes, The Company's Primatech Research facility and home of Level 5 is located in Hartsdale.

One scene from the comedy film The Other Guys was filmed at the Harmon Discount in Hartsdale.
