= Fudgie the Whale =

Ice cream cake sold by Carvel

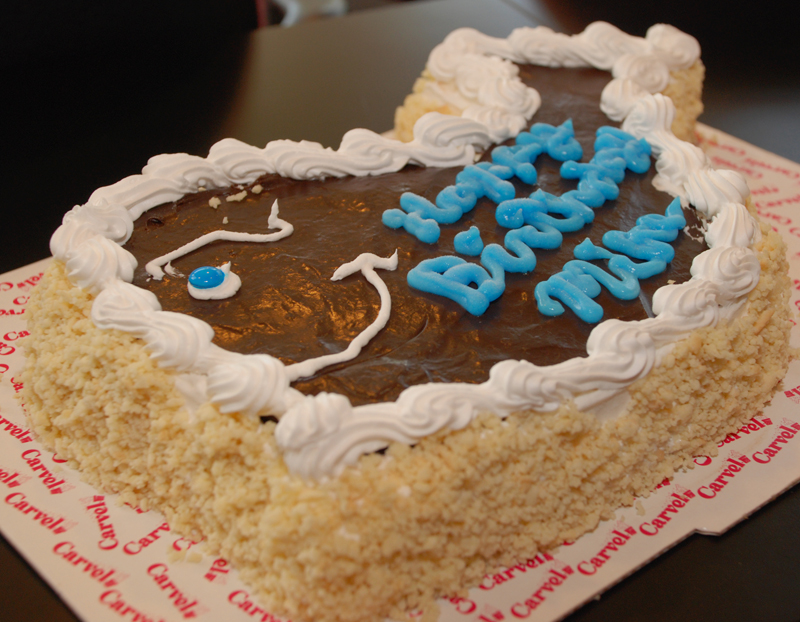
Carvel's Fudgie the Whale cake

Fudgie the Whale is a type of ice cream cake produced and sold by American ice-cream maker Carvel in its franchise stores. It was developed by Carvel in the 1970s as an expansion of its line of freshly made products, along with Hug Me the Bear and Cookie Puss.

== Development ==
Although the cake depicts the shape of a whale and was originally decorated as such, it was sometimes adapted for holiday uses by rotating it 90 degrees counter-clockwise so that the whale's body, now upright, could represent a face. The whale's tail would then represent whatever a character traditionally had on its head: the Easter Bunny's ears, or Santa Claus' tassel. But Fudgie the Whale was usually promoted around Father's Day, using the slogan, "For a whale of a dad".

Fudgie was developed by founder Tom Carvel, with the assistance of his employee Kathy Dumas.

== Co-branding ==
In 2018, Captain Lawrence Brewing Company partnered with Carvel to produce, in limited release, "Fudgie the Beer", a stout flavored with the chocolate crunchies also used to make Fudgie the Whale. The beer was re-released in limited quantities in 2019 to coincide with Father's Day, and was again re-released in June 2021 for the same reason.
