= Arctic roll =

British dessert

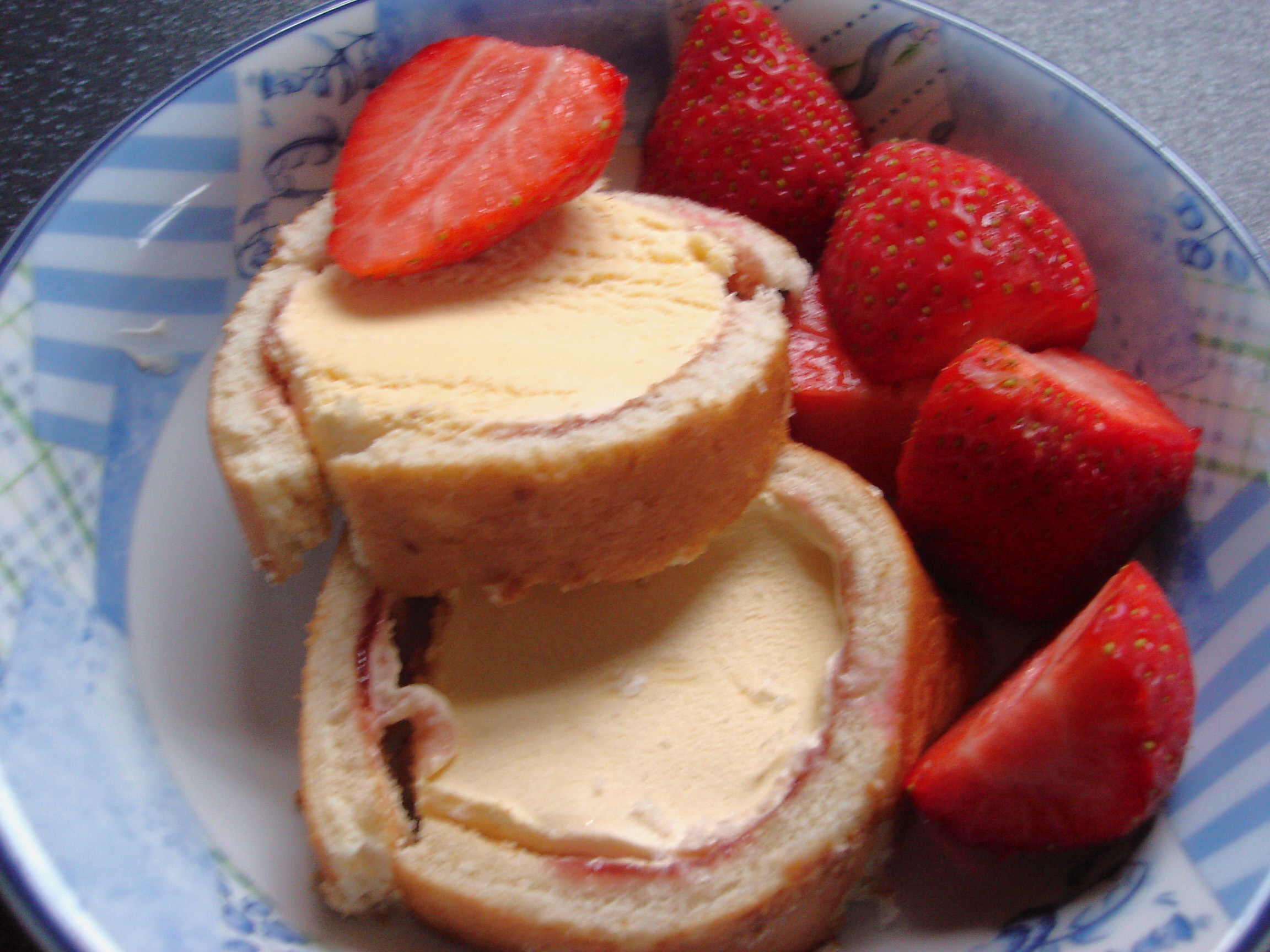
- A couple of slices of Arctic roll, with strawberries
- Course: Dessert
- Place of origin: United Kingdom
- Main ingredients: Sponge cake, vanilla ice cream, raspberry sauce

An Arctic roll is a British ice cream cake made of vanilla ice cream wrapped in a thin layer of sponge cake to form a roll, with a layer of raspberry flavoured sauce between the sponge and the ice cream.

== History ==
The dessert was invented in the 1950s by Ernest Velden, an immigrant from then Czechoslovakia. He set up a factory in Eastbourne producing Arctic roll in 1958, and the dessert soon became a successful product. During the 1980s, more than 40 kilometres (25 mi) of Birds Eye Arctic Roll were sold each month. However, sales slumped during the 1990s and eventually the manufacturer of Arctic roll, Birds Eye, stopped producing the dessert. The Great Recession that occurred from late 2007 to mid-2009 saw the reappearance of the Arctic roll as consumers increasingly looked for low-cost foods.

While some consumers view the Arctic roll as a comfort food, others view it as old fashioned and the food writer, journalist and broadcaster Nigel Slater has even described it as tasting of "frozen carpet". Nonetheless, Birds Eye reported "overwhelming consumer demand" for the dessert. Indeed, from when Birds Eye started marketing Arctic rolls again in December 2008 until April 2009, sales of the product were estimated at £3.5 million, or 3 million boxes (around 400 kilometres (250 mi) of Arctic roll). Commentators suggest that aside from the Arctic roll's low price, many consumers buy the dessert out of feelings of nostalgia. A number of UK supermarkets sell their own brand versions of the Arctic roll, both chocolate and raspberry variants, and did so even when Birds Eye were not marketing the product.

== Flavours ==
The original Arctic roll features vanilla ice cream and raspberry jam; Birds Eye also produce a variant using chocolate ice cream.

== See also ==
- Swiss roll
