= Jen Ponton =

American actress, screenwriter and producer

- Education: Ramapo College of New Jersey (BA)
- Occupations: Actress; screenwriter; producer
- Years active: 2009–present
- Website: JenPonton.com

Jennifer Ponton is an American actress, screenwriter and producer, best known for portraying Rubi in the AMC series Dietland.

== Early life ==
Ponton is an only child raised in Bloomsbury, New Jersey; she was a 2002 graduate of Phillipsburg High School, where she was active in the New Jersey Speech and Debate Forensics League, as well as drama club and musical groups. She is a 2006 graduate of Ramapo College of New Jersey, where she earned her BA in Theatre.

== Career ==
Ponton began her career in 2010 with a guest role on the episode "Reaganing" on 30 Rock opposite Kelsey Grammer; then a resident of Teaneck, New Jersey, she said that she was selected for the role very shortly after her audition. She went on to make recurring appearances on Law & Order: SVU, The Heart, She Holler, and The Slap, as well as guest appearances on Boardwalk Empire, The Good Wife, The Unbreakable Kimmy Schmidt, Blue Bloods, Deadbeat and The Blacklist. In 2018 she portrayed body positive activist Rubi on the AMC drama Dietland. Ponton also starred in the 2016 film Love on the Run opposite Steve Howey and Frances Fisher, and she has narrated Jennifer Weiner's The Littlest Bigfoot audiobook series. On stage, she originated the role of Dorrie in Halley Feiffer's How to Make Friends and then Kill Them at Rattlestick Playwrights Theatre. She is a member of the Television Academy.

She is a body positivity and fat acceptance activist, having spoken at length about the importance of size inclusion in entertainment. She was also a featured activist and speaker at the 2018 TCF Style Expo and the 2018 CurvyCon.

Ponton is also the co-creator and star of the puppet-led web series The Weirdos Next Door.

== Personal life ==
Ponton and her husband have been residents of the Budd Lake section of Mount Olive Township, New Jersey.

== Filmography ==
Film
Title	Year	Role	Notes
King Kelly	2012	Angela	Official selection of 2012 SXSW
Jack & Diane	2012	Stacy	Official selection of 2012 Tribeca Film Festival
Free the Nipple	2014	Charlie	Distributed by Sundance Selects and IFC
Enchantments	2015	Nancy	
Wiener-Dog	2016	Kristy	Official selection of 2016 Sundance
Love on the Run	2016	Franny	
Split	2016	Maria	
Occupy, Texas	2016	Harley	
Chuck	2016	PA	Official selection of 2016 Tribeca Film Festival
Going in Style	2017	Newlywed Wife	
Come on In	2018	Beverly	Bitch Pack Best in Show, Bluestocking Film Festival 2018
Beckys Through History	2019	Becky	
Queens of Daytime	2019	Sara Jo 'Addy' Adderson	TV movie
Pizza Party	2020	#1	
She Came to Me	2023	Elodie	
Love Magick	2023	Nancy	

Television
Title	Year	Role	Channel	Notes	
Primetime: What Would You Do?	2009	Bride	ABC	Episode: "Momzilla"	
30 Rock	2010	Brenda	NBC	Episode: "Reaganing"	Nominated for an Outstanding Writing Emmy
Law & Order: SVU	2010	Mia	NBC	Episode: "Gray"	
The Heart, She Holler	2011	Grinder	Adult Swim	2 episodes	
Boardwalk Empire	2012	Student	HBO	Episode: "You'd Be Surprised"	
The Good Wife	2014	Emily Balsam	CBS	Episode: "We, the Juries"	
Believe	2014	Hallway Nurse	NBC	Episode: Pilot	
Blue Bloods	2014	Kasia Mazurski	CBS	Episode: "Exiles"	
The Slap	2015	Janice	NBC	3 episodes	
Law & Order: SVU	2015	Layla	NBC	Episode: "Daydream Believer"	
Unbreakable Kimmy Schmidt	2016	Debbie Wells	Netflix	Episode: "Kimmy Meets a Celebrity!"	
Deadbeat	2016	Duchess Beatrix	Hulu	Episode: "The Duchess of Stourbridge"	
Orange Is the New Black	2016	Correcticon Check-In Girl	Netflix	Episode: "We'll Always Have Baltimore"	
The Blacklist	2016	Maisy	NBC	Episode: "Mato"	
Dietland	2018	Rubi	AMC	3 episodes	
Helpsters	2020	Cindy Circle	Apple TV+	Episode: "Scatter/Sid Square"	
Scratch This	2021	Angelica		Episode: "Ommm My God"	
Dickinson	2021	Body Healer	Apple TV+	Episode: "Forever - Is Composed of Nows"	
Three Women	2023	Barbara	Starz	2 episodes	
