= Ice cream cake =

Cake with ice cream filling

birthday ice cream cake

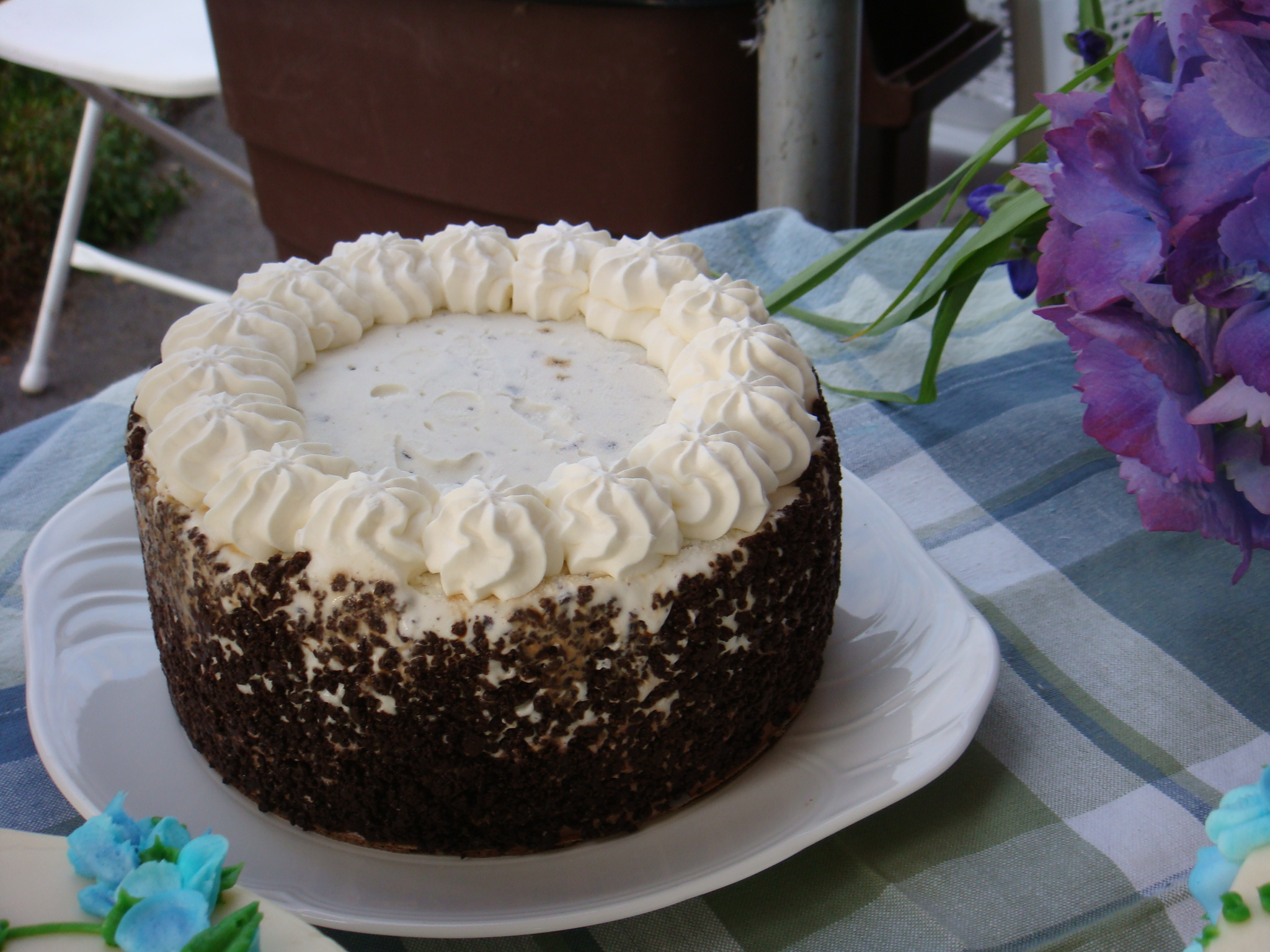
Chocolate ice cream cake

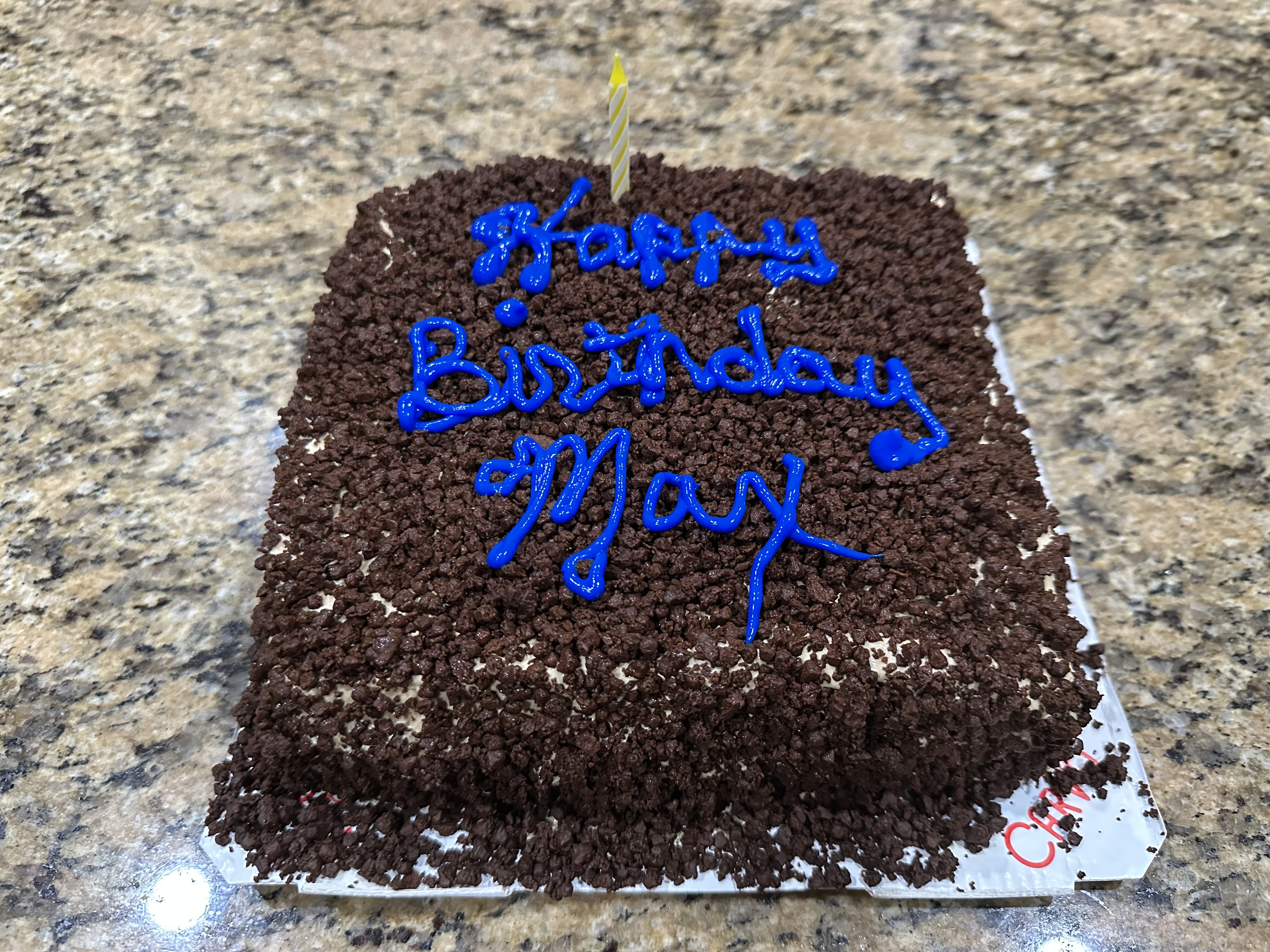
A coffee ice cream cake from Carvel in Boca Raton, Florida

An ice cream cake is a cake made with ice cream as an ingredient. A simpler no-bake version can be made by layering different flavors of ice cream in a loaf pan.

Ice cream cake is a popular party food, often eaten at birthdays, weddings, and other celebrations, particularly in North America and Australia. Regional variations exist around the world, such as Arctic rolls in the United Kingdom and cassata in India.

Although versions of ice cream cakes can be traced back as far as the 18th century, modern commercial versions only became widespread in the 20th century. The current world record for largest ice cream cake is a 10.13 ton cake made by Dairy Queen.

== Preparation ==
In a typical assembly, the cake component is baked in the normal way, often cut into specific shapes, and then cooled or frozen. Ice cream is shaped in a mold as appropriate, and these components are then assembled while frozen.

The modeling process of ice cream cake changed over time given the shift form manual to automated labor. Originally, the ice cream component was hand packed into hinged molds, but with advances in technology and production equipment, inline filling machines and cake fillers led to mass production of these products leading to increased familiarity. Metal molds were used to make ice cream cakes, with thick metal walls keeping the cake cool during the unmolding process.

The most common coatings for bulk ice cream cake consist of a formula which includes vegetable fat, sugar, milk, lecithin and specific flavors. For the decoration and frosting process of ice cream cakes sold in retail settings, horizontal extrusion lines and discharge nozzles work to create various designs, piping patterns, and finishing ice cream dollops. Smaller shapes or frosting patterns use post-extrusion molds or are pressed on the cakes after the fact.

Traditional or homemade ice cream cake commonly uses whipped cream for frosting, as a complement to the two other textures, and because many typical frostings will not adhere successfully to frozen cake. The whole cake is then kept frozen until serving, when it is allowed to thaw until it can be easily sliced but not so much as to melt the ice cream.

Commercial ice cream cakes tend to be made slightly differently. Dairy Queen's ice cream cakes are constructed using soft serve straight from each store's ice cream machine, which is dispensed into a metal mold and formed into a well. The cake portion and more ice cream are placed into the well, then smoothed out. The final ice cream form is decorated with whipped cream and cookie crumble. Friendly's ice cream cakes are made in a similar way, but in a factory assembly line. After the ice cream portion is assembled, cakes are placed in a nitrogen tunnel to harden for decoration.

== History and Development ==
The exact origins of ice cream cake are unclear, and its inventor and date of creation remain unknown. While some food historians suggest that early versions of the dessert may have appeared as early as the fourteenth century and spread to the rest of Europe across the fifteenth and seventeenth centuries, there is no definitive historical account confirming this theory, as scholars disagree on the matter.

The development of ice cream cake is closely associated with the broader evolution of frozen desserts and the combination of ice cream with other confectionary products. Early forms of ice cream cake involved combining ice cream with cake to create a layered dessert. They can be traced as far back as the eighteenth century with some bombe recipes featuring molded blocks of ice cream and containing a layer of sponge cake. The composition and preparation of these desserts have varied over time. While the idea of a dessert specifically called "ice cream cake" has existed since at least the nineteenth century, historical recipes vary in their resemblance to modern ice cream cakes. Again, it is difficult to trace the exact history of ice cream cakes, but there is substantial evidence regarding the origin of ice cream itself and how its development has enabled the development of innovative frozen desserts.

The first major shift occurred when the production of ice cream cakes evolved from largely manual process into one that could be mechanized. Ice cream cakes were formerly produced through manual operations, but the development of specialized equipment and extrusion technology has enabled automated production and increased their availability. Modern production methods involve extruding ice cream through specially designed nozzles onto support trays, where it is cut into layers using electrically heated wire cutters.The development of specialized production techniques has also expanded the variety of ice cream cakes available. Manufacturers can produce cakes in different shapes and sizes, incorporate multiple flavours and fillings, and add decorative elements such as whipped cream, toppings and chocolate coatings.

Ice cream cakes are classified as a novelty product, meaning they have particularly unique design and presentation. In the modern novelty market, novelty consumables also denote artisanal and hand-made products. However, the rise in the novelty ice cream market correlates to the industrialization of the diary industry, shifting production from manual labor to automated equipment. This industrial shift increased accessibility of ice cream cakes and other dairy novelty products, especially in super markets and grocery stores.

By the 1950s, Carvel was selling ice cream cakes in locations across the United States. Dairy Queen has been selling ice cream cakes since at least the 1980s. According to a 1982 ad, Dairy Queen sold 8 inch cakes for $6.95 and 11 inch cakes for $9.95. Baskin-Robbins has similarly been selling them since at least 1980, with a customizable special-edition Valentine's day cake selling for $8.00 around that time.

=== Largest ice cream cake record ===
The current Guinness World Record for the largest ice cream cake is held by Dairy Queen Canada, which celebrated the branch's 30th anniversary with a 22,333.6 pound (10.13 ton) Oreo-topped vanilla ice cream sponge cake in 2011. A commercial airplane scale was used to weigh the one meter tall, 4.45 meter by 4.05 meter large cake. Graduate engineering students from the University of Toronto's Department of Chemical Engineering and Applied Chemistry’s food engineering laboratory helped ensure the massive cake was structurally sound and wouldn't collapse during the weighing process.

Previous records include a 8,962 pound cake made with Baskin-Robbins in 1999, a nearly 11,000 pound cake created by Carvel for its 70th anniversary in 2004, and a 19,290 pound cake made by a group in Beijing in 2006.

== Retail ==
Ice cream cakes can be found at multiple retailers due to large-scale manufacturing. They can be found mostly in supermarkets, grocery stores and creameries. In the United States, notable fast-food franchises that sell ice cream cakes include Baskin-Robbins, Dairy Queen, Friendly's, and Cold Stone Creamery.

== Around the world ==
North America

In the United States, ice cream cakes are a popular dessert for Fourth of July celebrations. Cakes prepared for this day are often decorated with patriotic motifs, such as red-and-blue layers to emulate the American flag, and garnished with whipped cream, red berries, and blueberries. The ice cream franchise Carvel also has a history of producing themed cakes for holidays such as Father's Day and Thanksgiving, with notable characters like Fudgie the Whale and Tom the Turkey. In Canada, the ice cream log cake is popular during the winter holidays.

Europe

In the United Kingdom, ice cream Swiss roll cakes are known as Arctic rolls.

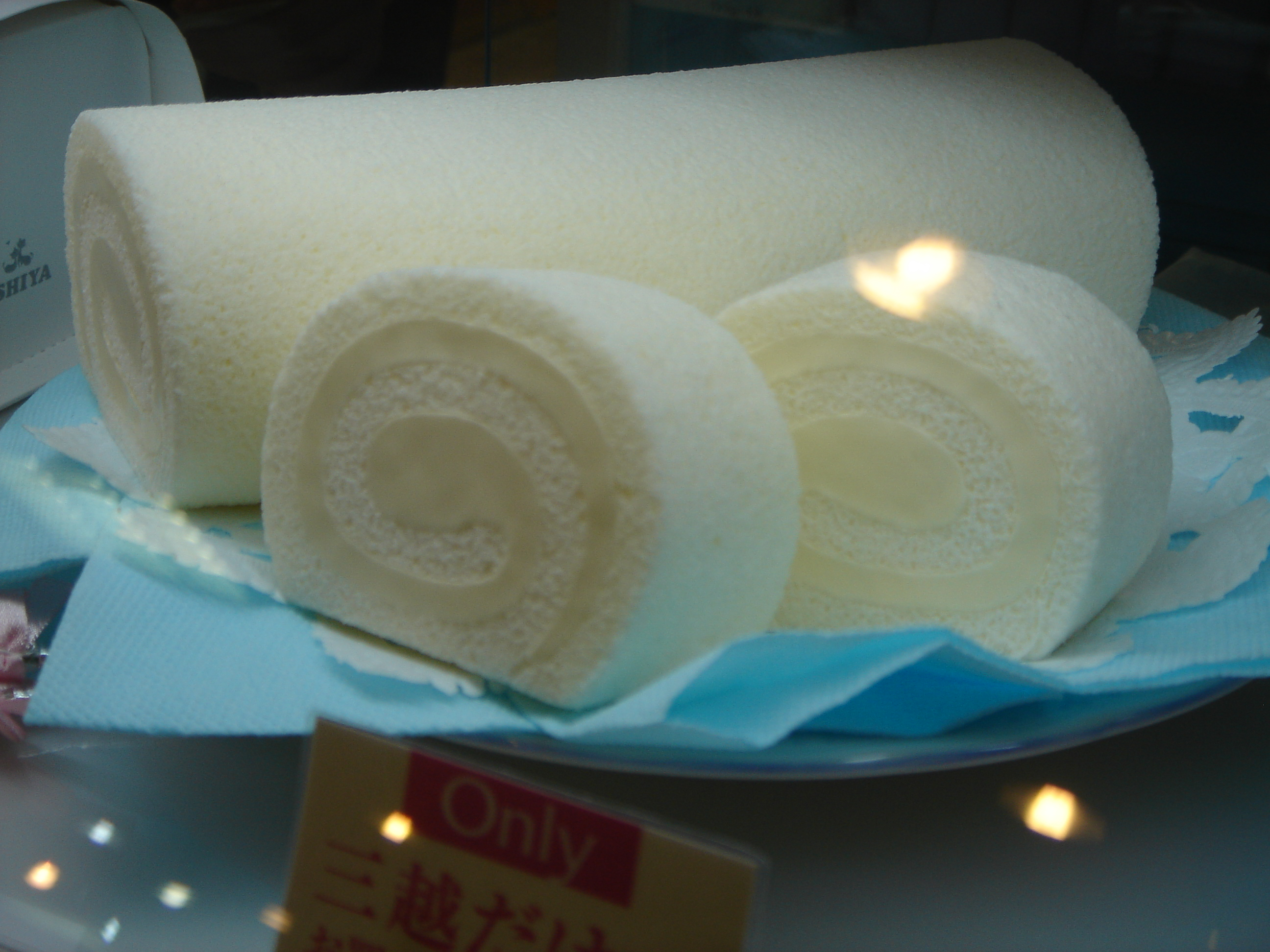
Ice cream swiss roll

In Italy, Zuccotto is a pumpkin-shaped domed dessert that has origins in Florence and contains layers of cake, ice cream and alchermes. It is often topped with chocolate drizzle or icing sugar. Vacherin glacé is a frozen dessert made from an ice cream filling, a meringue shell, and whipped cream topping. It has origins in Switzerland, and can be found in France and Germany.

Asia

In India, a variation of ice-cream cake called Cassata includes layers of ice-cream, sponge cake and nuts.

== See also ==
- Baked Alaska
- Bombe glacée
