= Carvel (franchise) =

American ice cream franchise

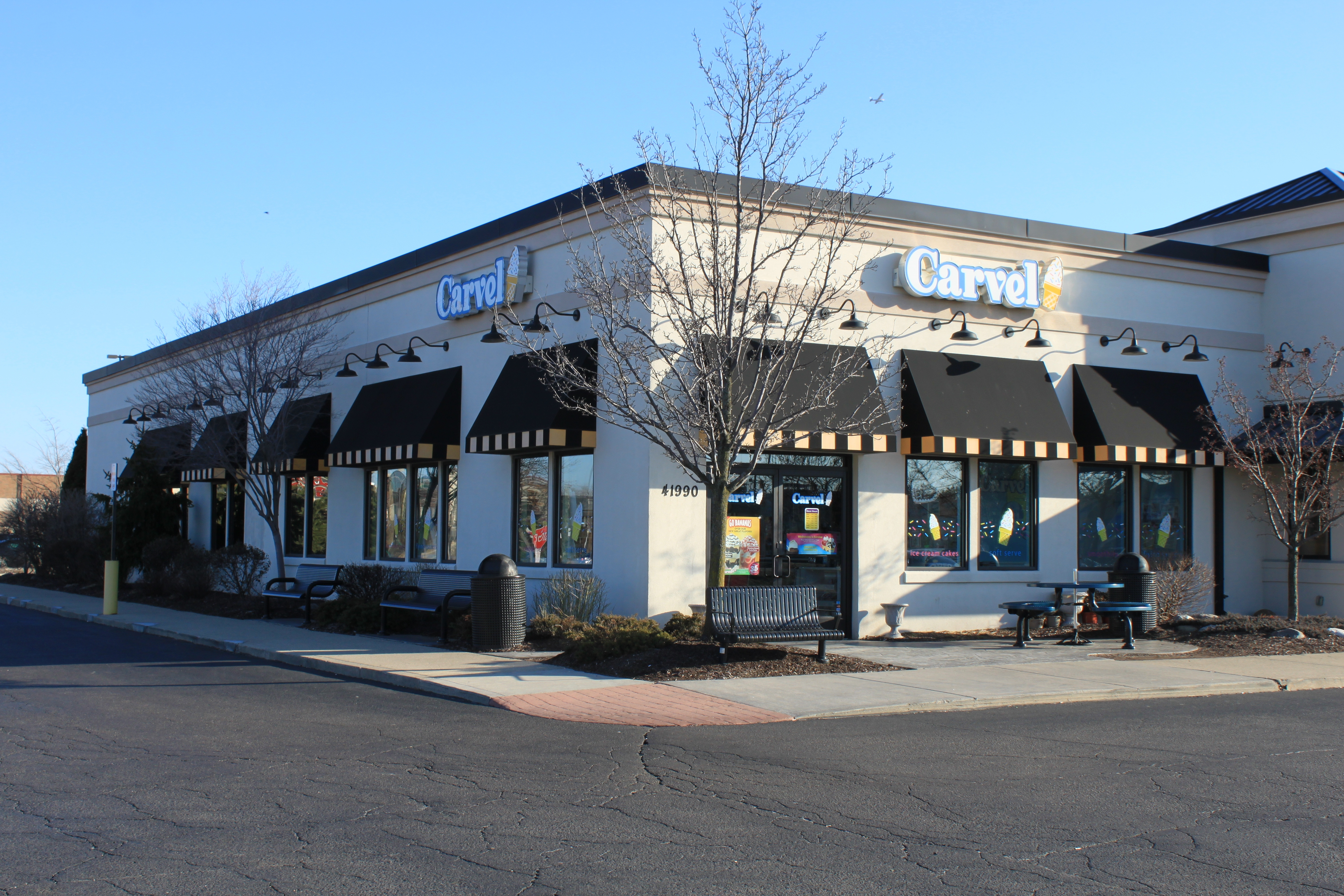
- A Carvel franchise location in Canton, Michigan
- Type: Subsidiary
- Industry: Dessert; Franchising
- Genre: Ice cream parlor
- Founded: 1929; 97 years ago in Hartsdale, New York
- Founder: Tom Carvel
- Headquarters: Atlanta, Georgia, United States
- Number of locations: 320
- Area served: United States
- Key people: Jim Salerno (Chief Brand Officer); Jim Holthouser (CEO)
- Products: Soft serve, milkshakes, sundaes, frozen treats, cakes
- Services: Franchising
- Revenue: ▲US$67.8 million (2019)
- Owner: Roark Capital Group
- Parent: GoTo Foods
- Website: www.carvel.com

Carvel is an American ice cream franchise owned by GoTo Foods (formerly Focus Brands). Carvel is best known for its soft-serve ice cream and ice cream cakes, which feature a layer of distinctive "crunchies". It also sells a variety of novelty ice cream bars and ice cream sandwiches. Its slogan is "America's Freshest Ice Cream".

Carvel operates a chain of ice cream outlets spread across 16 states and Puerto Rico. Mainly concentrated in the Northeast United States and Florida, its stores are primarily located in high-traffic areas such as airports, malls, and sports arenas. The company also sells ice cream cakes in more than 8,500 supermarkets.

Since 2001, the corporation has been owned by Roark Capital Group and operated as part of Focus Brands. As of 2025, the company reports having 326 locations in 16 states and eight countries.

== Novelty ice creams ==
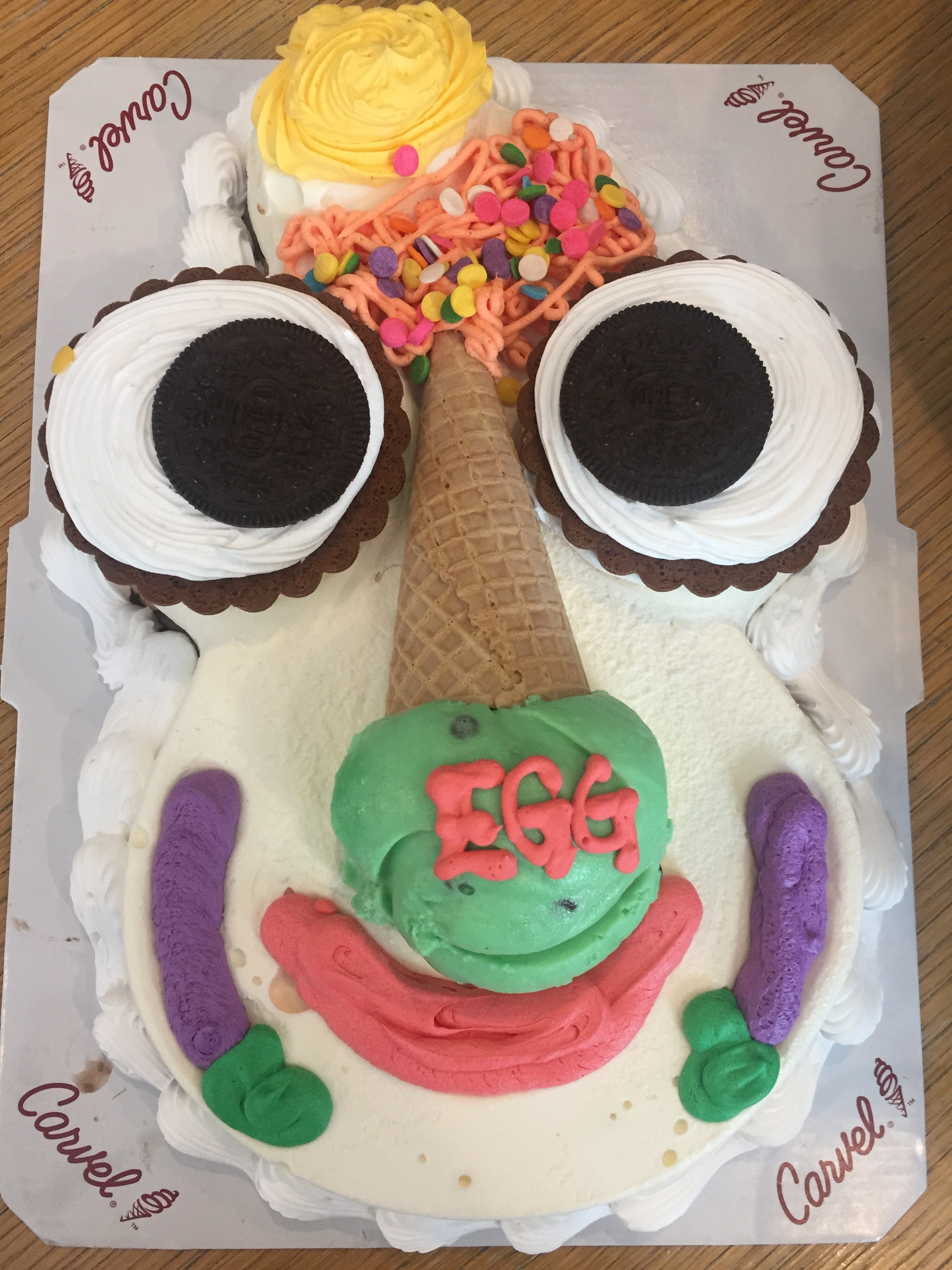
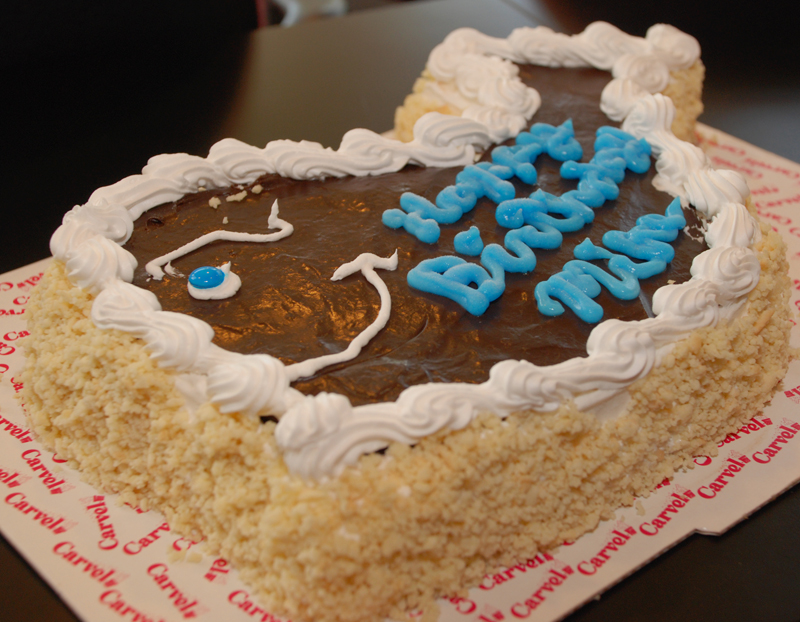
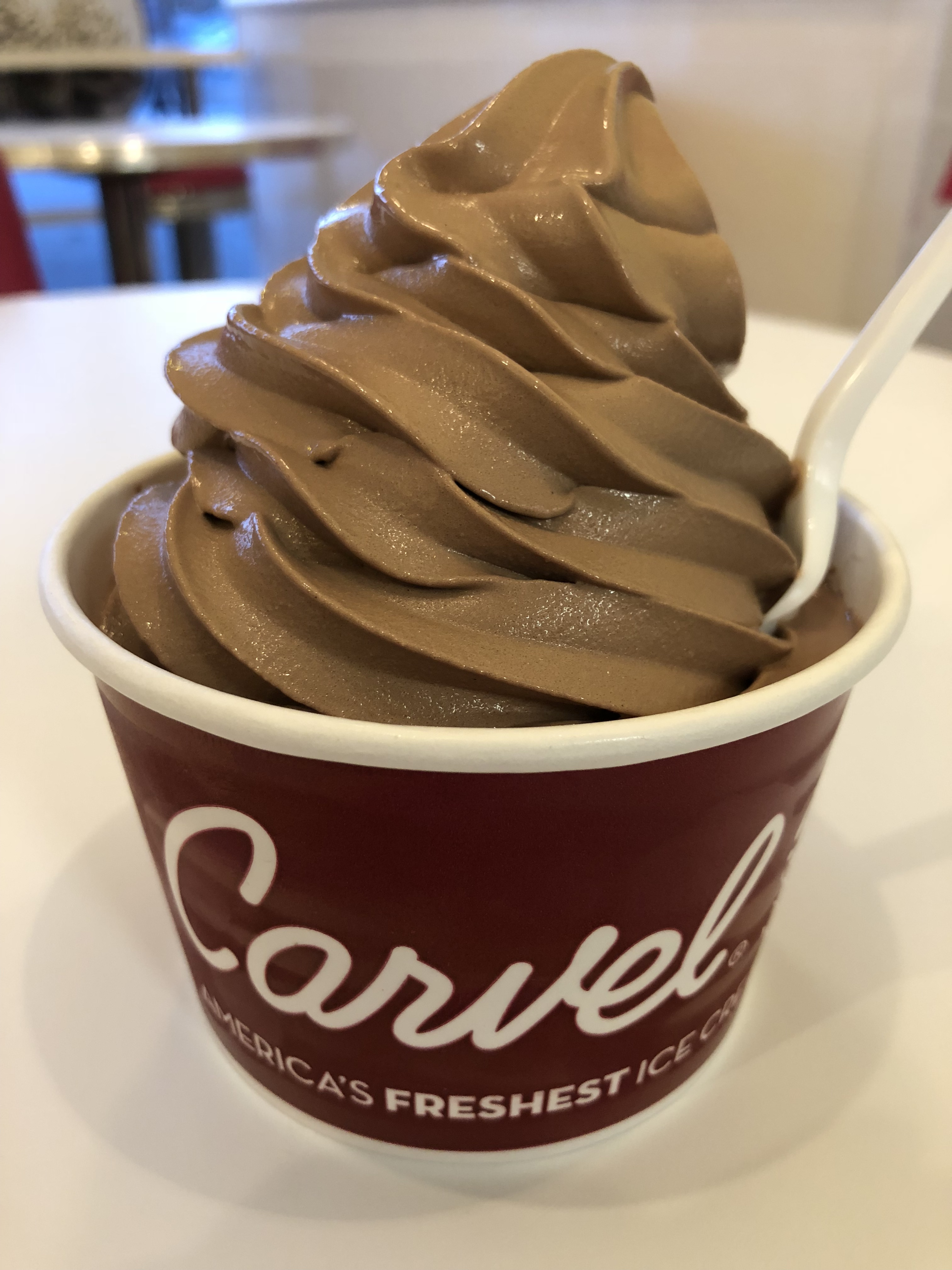
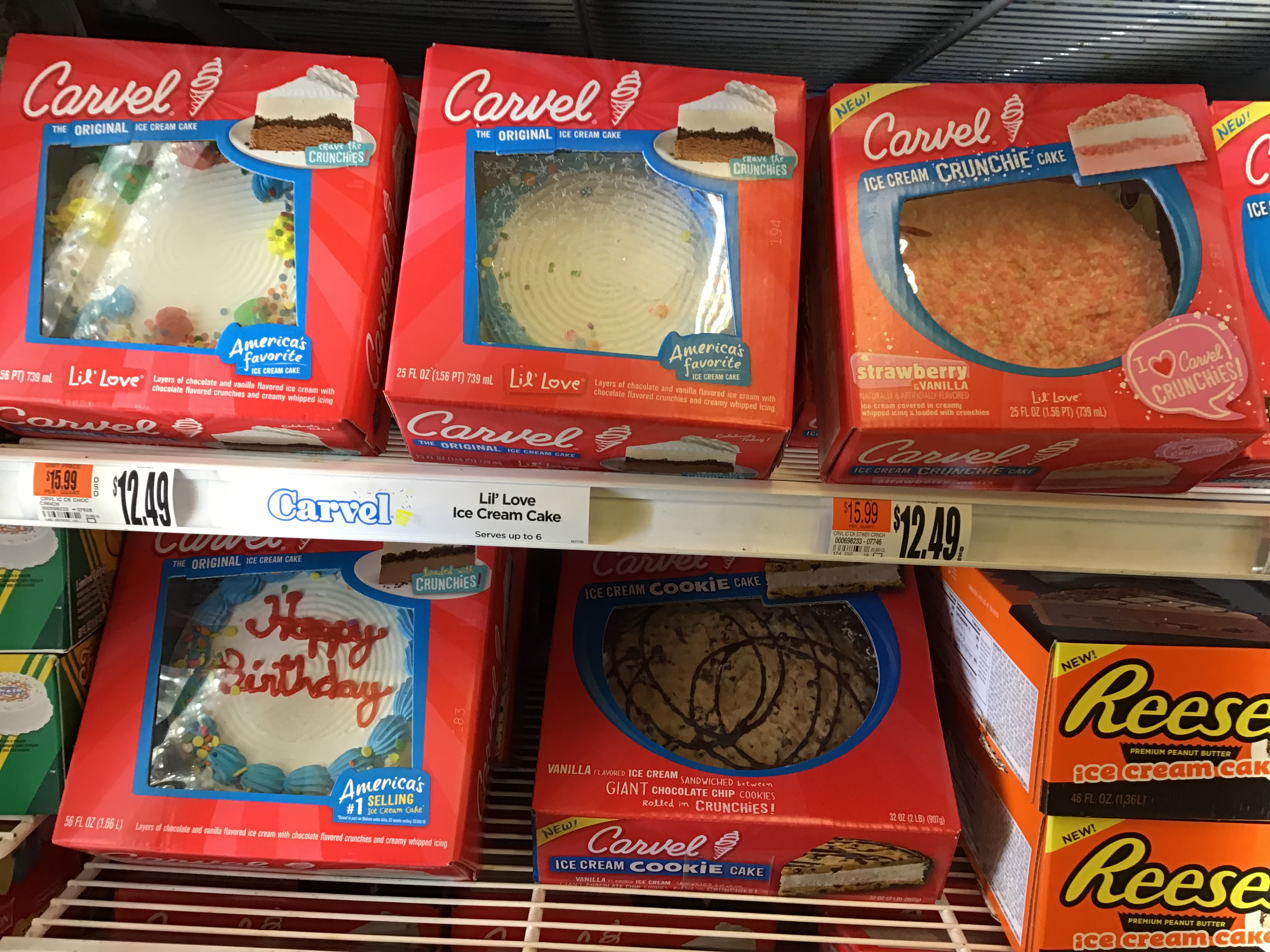
Clockwise: Cookie Puss, Fudgie the Whale, conventional ice cream cakes, and soft-serve ice cream

Carvel popularized various novelty ice cream items, such as the "Flying Saucer", a circular ice cream sandwich; the "Icy Wycy", a paper cone of sherbet on a stick; "Brown Bonnet" and "Cherry Bonnet", frozen vanilla ice cream on a sugar cone dipped in a sweet, waxy confection; the "Tortoni", a cup of vanilla ice cream covered with toasted coconut and topped with a maraschino cherry; and the "Lollapalooza", cylindrical ice cream on a stick covered with colored sprinkles, as well as the "Mamapalooza" and "Papapalooza".

The mainstays of Carvel's line of ice cream cakes were 7- to 12-inch rounds, 10 x 14 and 12 x 17-inch sheet cakes, and the "Carvelog", a log-shaped cake made in a cylindrical mold. In addition to Cookie Puss, Fudgie the Whale and Hug-Me the Bear, there were special cakes for most major holidays, including a "Flower Basket" for Mother's Day, "Hoot The Owl" for June graduations, "Dumpy the Pumpkin" and "Wicky The Witch" for Halloween, "Tom the Turkey" for Thanksgiving, "Seamus The Leprechaun" or "Cookie O'Puss" for St. Patrick's Day, and Santa Claus or a "Snow Man" for Christmas. Most of these were made from one of a limited number of molds; the Santa Claus cake had a two-pointed hat because the mold was ordinarily inverted and used the rest of the year to make Fudgie the Whale, who had a tail. Their primary differences from products available year-round were the designs on the icing.

Carvel introduced the Lil' Love ice cream cake on March 30, 1998. The commercials, which first appeared in its introduction, show small children in special situations, such as losing a baby tooth, starring in a class play, getting an A in a school class, and getting new glasses (sung to the tune of "Ta-ra-ra Boom-de-ay"). A mother presents a new cake to celebrate. All ads carry the tagline Surprise someone special tonight.

== History ==
Carvel logo from 1989 to 2012

Carvel was founded and operated by Tom Carvel for its first 60 years. In 1929, Carvel borrowed $15 ($280 today) from his future wife Agnes and used it to buy and operate an ice cream truck. Over Memorial Day weekend of 1934, Carvel's truck had a flat tire in Hartsdale, New York. Within two days, Carvel had sold out his inventory on the spot, much of it partly melted. He realized that a fixed location selling soft ice cream (known at the time as frozen custard) as opposed to hard was good business. In his first year, he grossed over $3,500. By 1937 he had a soft-serve stand at the Hartsdale site, with a freezer allowing him to make his own product. By 1939, the gross revenue was over $6,000.

In the early 1940s, Tom Carvel traveled, selling soft serve at carnivals, while his wife Agnes ran the Hartsdale location. During World War II, he ran the ice cream stands at Fort Bragg in North Carolina, gaining expertise in refrigeration technology. He invented and patented a freezer, the "Custard King", and in 1947 sold 71 freezers at $2,900 each. Some freezer purchasers defaulted on payments on the units. Upon investigation, Carvel found that they needed to run their businesses more efficiently, choosing poor locations and only sometimes maintaining high health standards. Carvel decided that the best course was to participate in running the operations of his freezer customers. He later claimed this led him to develop the concept of franchising.

=== Franchising and advertising ===
In 1949, Carvel began franchising under the name "Carvel Dari-Freez". By the early 1950s, the company had over 50 stores. New franchisees undertook an 18-day training program at the "Carvel College of Ice Cream Knowledge", and were sent an in-house magazine called "The Shopper's Road". In addition, Carvel provided building plans for franchises, which were initially stand-alone glass-fronted stores.

In 1955, Tom Carvel began to record his own radio commercials. In a 1982 interview on Late Night with David Letterman, Carvel said that he decided to announce his own commercials in 1958 after the announcer on a commercial for the grand opening of a Carvel store in New York City did not mention the new store's location. Convinced he could do better, he drove to the radio station and did the next commercial himself. From then onwards, Carvel recorded nearly all of the chain's advertising, eventually maintaining an in-house production studio at the headquarters offices and becoming something of a regional celebrity.

Carvel's commercials stood out and raised brand awareness primarily through their lack of sophistication. Carvel had a distinctive "gravelly" voice, lacking the "slick" sound of most professional voice-over artists, and all his narration was unrehearsed. His wording was conversational, with commercials frequently ending with the words "Thank You". Television commercials aired primarily in the "tri-state area" of New York, New Jersey, and Connecticut, began in 1971. Accompanied by the familiar Tom Carvel narration, footage showed the products and employees in the stores; very few graphics or effects were used.

Promotions were part of Carvel's practices from their earliest days. In 1936, they had a "Buy One Get One Free" promotion and various contests in later years. They were an early adopter of corporate sponsorship of various events and tie-in promotions, including a tie-in with the New York Yankees. A long-running and well-known campaign was the "Wednesday is Sundae at Carvel!" discount.

=== Further developments ===
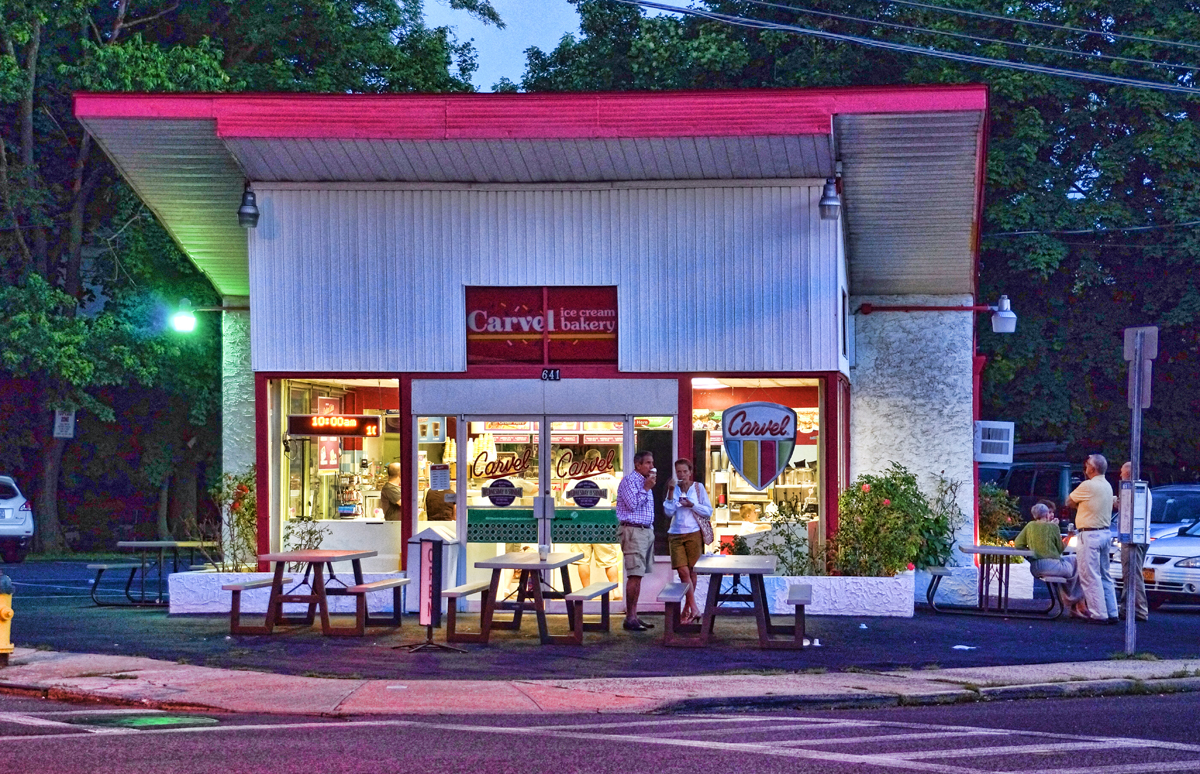
Mamaroneck, New York, location

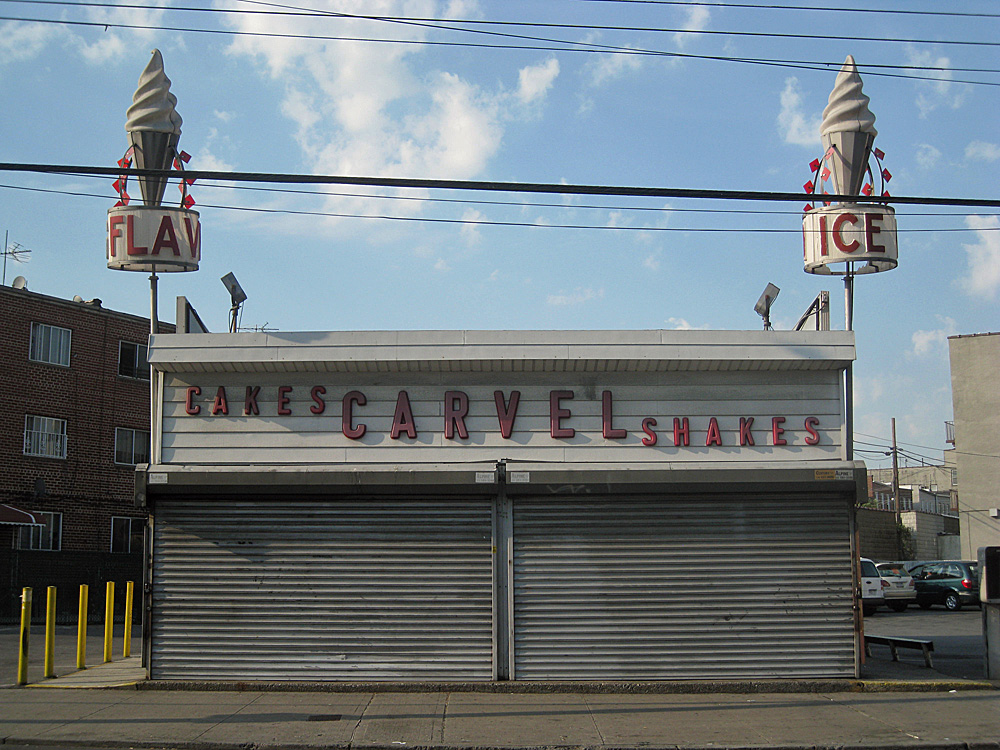
A closed older style Carvel

In 1956, Carvel transformed the Hartsdale location into their first "Ice Cream Supermarket" by adding freezer cases containing pre-made cakes and novelty items which customers could choose and purchase. In 1955, Carvel began its "lease back land offer" program, in which a potential investor could buy land, build a franchise, then lease it back to the corporation.

Carvel experimented with various ice cream vehicle options for most of its early history. Vehicle concepts included a scooter (circa 1957) and a custom truck, the "Carvehicle", for which they applied for several patents (circa 1958).

A dispute with franchisees came to a head in 1962. Independent owners attempted to buy products outside the corporate supply chain (in conflict with their contracts), maintaining that the company was deliberately overcharging them. Carvel argued that the franchisees were trying to use inferior ingredients. As well as the immediate impact on corporate cash flow, this hurt the corporate image, reducing the chain to 175 stores. When the corporation tried to enforce this contract, the Federal Trade Commission sued them for restraint of trade. Legal proceedings reached the Supreme Court of the United States in 1964, with the corporation emerging victorious.

In 1967, the corporation bought the Westchester Town House Motel on Tuckahoe Road in Yonkers, New York and renamed it the Carvel Inn, converting it for use as corporate headquarters while still operating it as a hotel, providing them with a conference center for the annual franchisee conventions.

During the late 1970s, Carvel attempted to distinguish itself from other purveyors of soft-serve ice cream by claiming that its ice cream machines did not infuse the product with air, unlike the competition. During the 1970s, when dieting and fitness became more popular, Carvel began offering a low-fat frozen dessert called Thinny-Thin ("Thinny-Thin, for your fatty-fat friends") and a frozen yogurt product called Lo-Yo. From 1973 to 1975, Carvel published a promotional comic book.

In 1983, Saturday Night Live parodied Carvel's ad campaigns during its season 9 episode 7 show, with Joe Piscopo portraying Tom Carvel becoming increasingly troubled by a franchisee's line of X-rated Christmas cakes shaped like human "private parts". The same year, the Beastie Boys released their first single, Cooky Puss, which included audio of the rap band making prank phone calls to a Carvel store.

By 1985, there were 865 stores with an income of over $300 million.

In the late 1980s and early 1990s, Howard Stern used a vocal harmonizer to imitate the "outer space" voice of Cookie Puss that was used in Carvel's TV advertisements. Stern also frequently references longtime co-worker Fred Norris's cluelessness and cheapness in having once given his mother a Cookie Puss cake as a Mother's Day gift.

=== Ownership changes and supermarket sales ===
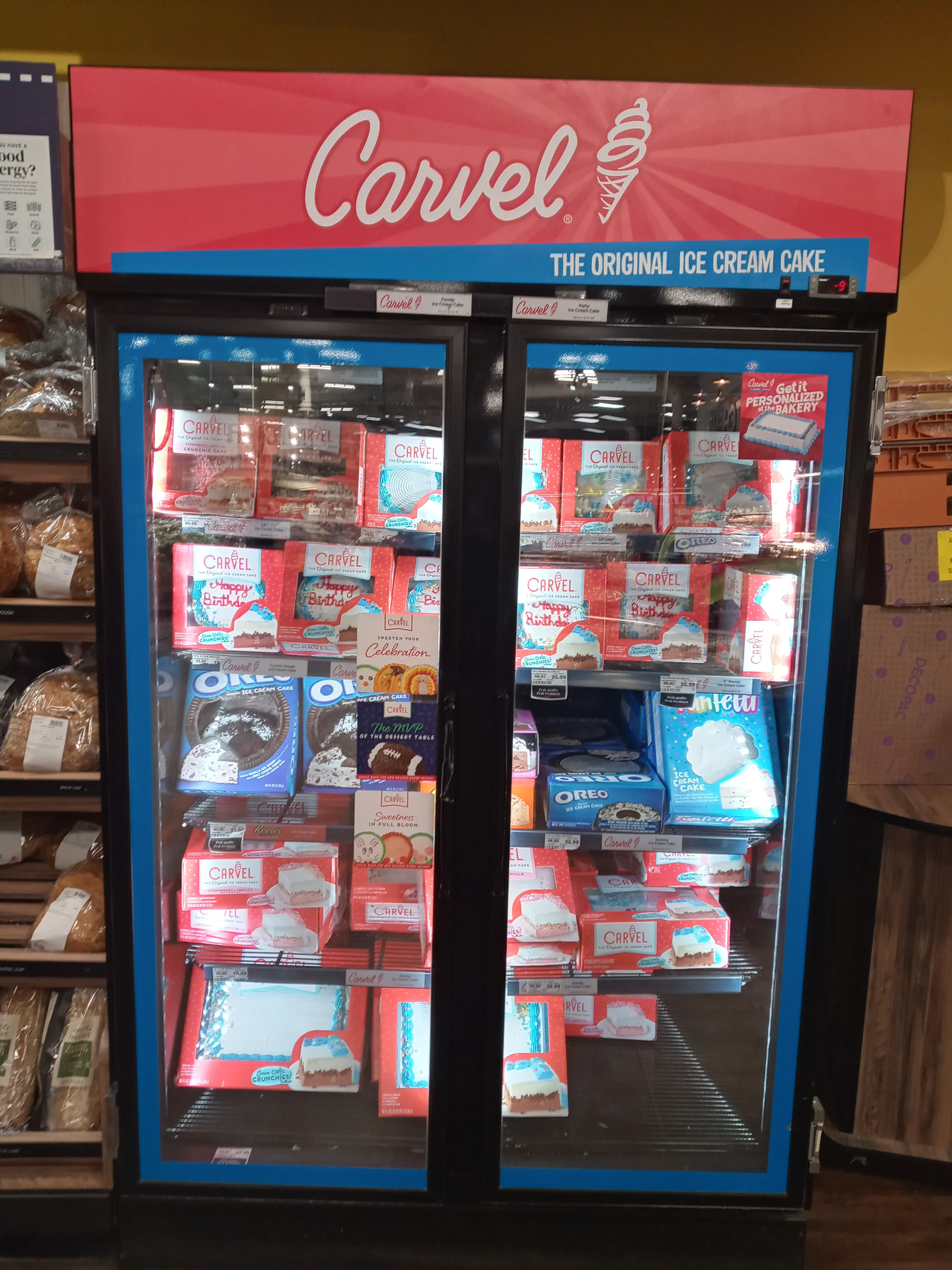
Carvel Ice Cream Cakes at Shoprite of Essex Green, West Orange, New Jersey

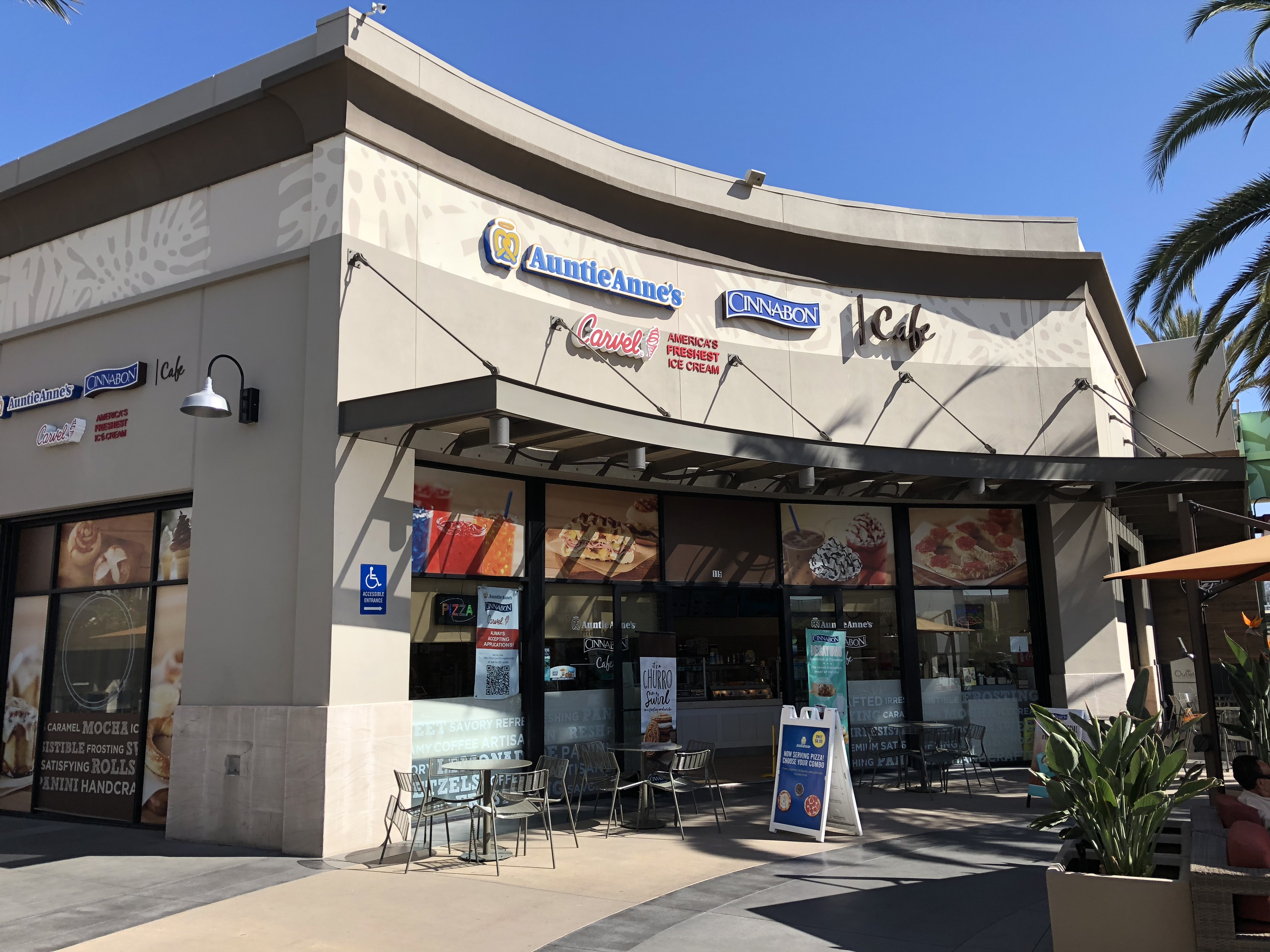
Carvel co-branded store in San Ysidro, California

In 1989 an aging Tom Carvel sold the corporation to Investcorp for $80 million. In 1991 its headquarters was moved to Farmington, Connecticut. Documents stated that Tom Carvel had repeatedly promised never to sell his ice cream in supermarkets and referred to them as the "enemy." However, under new president Steven Fellingham, Carvel began supplying cakes to supermarkets and forced franchises to promote them. Carvel said they began their supermarket program "to adjust for consumers' one-stop-shopping buying patterns." They also saw supermarket sales as a way to reduce losses from growing competition with both ice cream and frozen yogurt.

Their supermarket presence expanded during the 1990s, but analysts said that it angered franchisees who felt it would hurt business at their stores. About fifty franchisees sued Carvel for selling ice cream more cheaply in supermarkets, claiming that "company-created competition ruined their businesses." However, Carvel argued that the franchise contracts did not limit where they could sell ice cream, and that franchisees could sell to supermarkets directly. The franchisees were awarded $1.04 million in trial court, but the New York Court of Appeals ruled to scale back the verdict and reduced the award to $400,000 for breach of contract.

In 2001 the number of Carvel franchises in the United States had declined over the past 10 years from about 700 to 400. On December 11, 2001, Roark Capital Group, a private equity firm, purchased a controlling interest in Carvel Corporation from Investcorp. Investcorp became a minority shareholder.

In August 2007 Abdul Faghihi, the owner of the original Carvel location in Hartsdale, New York, revealed that he had applied for permission to knock down the store and develop a retail strip on the property. The Hartsdale store was closed on October 5, 2008, to make way for a Japanese restaurant.

As of 2008 Carvel products were available in 8,500 supermarkets nationwide. Their geographic presence expanded from 25 states in 2002 to nearly all 50 states in 2008.

In 2015, Carvel started to open co-branded stores with Auntie Anne's and Cinnabon.

As of 2022, there were 358 Carvel franchises worldwide, with 326 in the United States. In 2023, the Carvel website reported 331 Carvel locations in the United States, 246 of which were in New York, New Jersey and Connecticut.

== See also ==
- Cinnabon Swirl
- List of dairy product companies in the United States
- List of frozen custard companies
