= Luo Heng =

Luo Heng may refer to:

- Luo Heng (politician) (羅衡), Chinese politician
- Luo Heng (footballer) (罗恒), Chinese footballer
- Luo Yin (罗橫), Chinese poet born Luo Heng
