= Women in Chinese government =

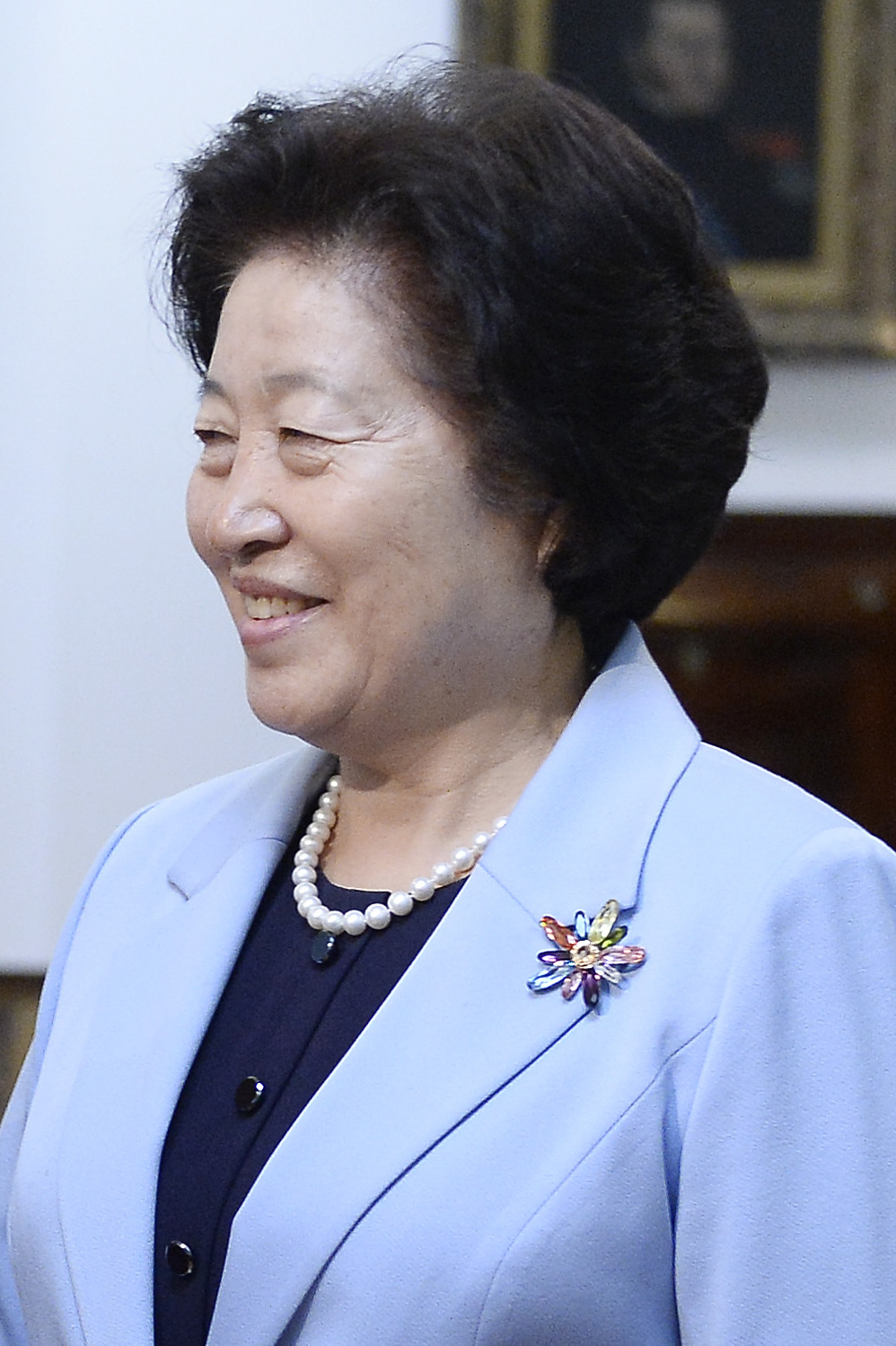
Former Vice Premier Sun Chunlan, the highest-ranking incumbent female official until her retirement in 2023

Women in China are under-represented in government, especially in high-ranking positions.

== Historical overview ==
In ancient and historical China, women were restricted from many realms of social life, including holding office. Only one woman ever ruled the Chinese Empire as sovereign in her own name, Wu Zetian, between 690 and 705. Many other women had control over the imperial court as either consorts or regents of male sovereigns. Notably, Empress Dowager Cixi effectively controlled the government from 1861 until her death in 1908. The Chinese suffragette movement emerged in the 1900s with the pro-Republican movement. After the monarchy was overthrown in 1911, the Provisional Constitution of the Republic of China in 1912 excluded women's participation in politics, and suffragettes continued to campaign. In 1936, women's suffrage was included in a draft of the constitution, though it was only implemented in 1947.

Since the 1920s, the Chinese Communist Party (CCP), under Mao Zedong, pushed for women's mobilisation in China. The CCP specifically pushed for peasant women to mobilise, because the party believed that rural women were less linked to old power structures and would oppose class enemies.

In 1939, Mao Zedong proposed creating a women's university where the CCP could develop female cadres. The Chinese Women's University was inaugurated on 20 July of that year in Yan'an, and Mao's inauguration speech emphasized the role of women in resisting the Japanese invasion of China. Mao stated, "The day all women in China rise up is the moment of China's revolutionary victory!"

After the CCP took power in 1949 and established the People's Republic of China, the party continued to prioritise mobilising women politically. Mao's statement, "women hold up half the sky", became a major slogan in CCP's support for women's rights. Mao granted women more legal rights and established the All-China Women's Federation within the CCP to promote women's rights. Mao also set up a quota for women in political leadership.

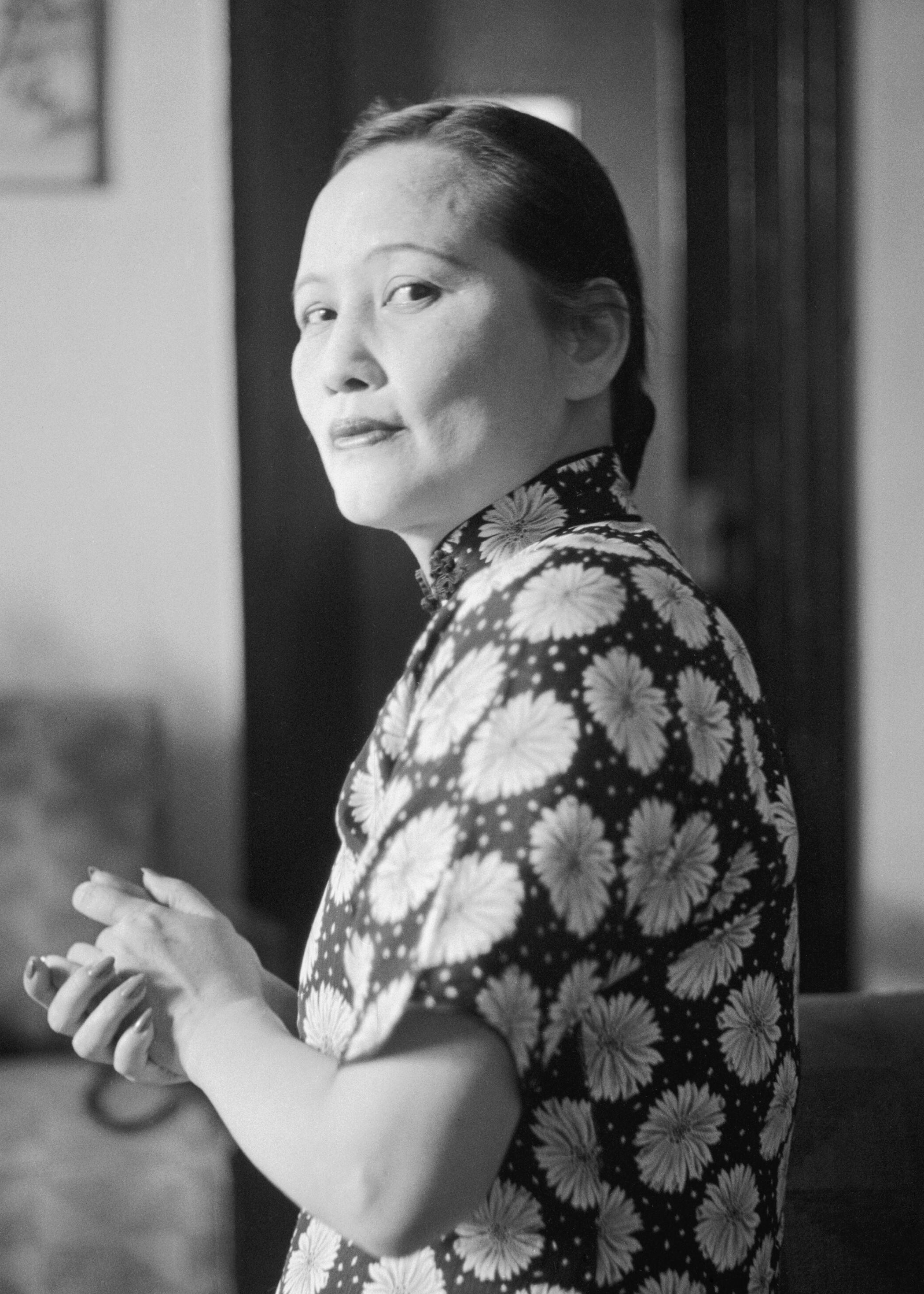
Soong Ching-ling, the widow of Sun Yat-Sen, held several high offices in the PRC

During the first few decades of the PRC, the most prominent woman in Chinese government was Soong Ching-ling. The widow of former Chinese president Sun Yat-sen, Soong had been elected honorable chairperson to the Revolutionary Committee of the Chinese Kuomintang (RCCK) in 1948, and would remain in various prestigious positions throughout her subsequent political life. She was Vice Chairman of China (1949–1954; 1959–1975) and Vice Chairman of the Standing Committee of the National People's Congress (1954–1959; 1975–1981). She traveled abroad during the early 1950s, representing her country at a number of international events. She was the acting chairperson during 1968–1972 and acting head of state during 1976–1978, and was conferred the special title of "Honorary Chairman of the People's Republic of China" in 1981.

During the Cultural Revolution, two female model workers and Mao loyalists, Wu Guixian and Li Suwen, each rose from without political rank at all to national-level leadership positions within seven years, Wu as vice premiere and Li as vice chairperson of the Standing Committee of the National People's Congress (NPC). However, despite the gender quota established by Mao, women were severely under-represented in the more powerful positions. Subsequent party leaders such as Zhao Ziyang strongly opposed women's participation in the political process. In terms of the number of women in parliament, China went from 17th in the world in 1997 to 87th in 2023.

== Local level ==
Despite the fact that a cornerstone of the CCP's ideological principles is "equality between men and women", there is little evidence to suggest that it is adopted in practice. When studying the history of women in local government, it is clear that there is little evidence of equality. In 1995 the percentage of township or small town heads who were women was 3.84%. Furthermore, in this study in one township surveyed, with eighteen village level party branches, aside from the seventeen directors of All-China Women Federations, there was not a single woman cadre. These facts demonstrate the historical problem women have faced in local politics in China.

In comparison, the National Bureau of Statistics of China states that at county level in 2021, the percentage of women occupying these roles was 10.6%. While the numbers clearly show high levels of discrimination and misogyny it is a positive step that those numbers have improved, although there is a lot of room for improvement. It is clear that the reasons behind these figures stem from an attitude of discrimination in China. Traditionally women have only been appointed to political roles in departments that cover "women's work" due to the gendered division of labour.

This discrimination on a local level can be further highlighted when examining the career trajectory of Chinese mayors by gender as well as studying the portfolios they have been given. The discrimination is underlined when examining the percentage of women who start their political career at the Youth League or the Women's Federation. These roles are considered to be "feminine" and as such are traditionally given to women. 32% of female mayors have previously had a portfolio covering a local Youth League in comparison to 14% male. Furthermore 4% of female mayors had regional roles in the Women's Federation in comparison to zero men. This conforms to the stereotype above suggesting that a lot of government roles are said to be "women’s roles" and as such this confirms some of the discrimination in the workplace women in local politics face.

However, despite the evidence above there is contradictory data. Women on average get promoted from local government into a mayoral position two years younger than men, on average at the age of 47. While this demonstrates a positive step for women in China, it is clear that there is a "glass ceiling for many women" which prevents them from obtaining provincial roles. Furthermore, the average age of 47 is from a much smaller sample size so doesn't give us an entirely clear picture as to the chances of promotion for women in local Chinese politics. However, while this discrimination is a common theme, it is not always the case in all provincial politics.

== Provincial level ==
As previously stated, women's political participation in China is overwhelmingly low. There is a small proportion of women taking positions at higher levels or any key sectors. Most female leaders usually served in provincial governance and as central government vice-ministers. In 2021, there were 31 female vice-governors and vice mayors – which accounted for an average of one per province. The CCP makes it known that women are appointed on the same ground as male leaders - age, education, CCP membership and experience. That said, there still exists considerable gender disparities when selecting provincial leaders in China. The lack of institutional policies and processes, as well as the ongoing disadvantages in education, political networks, and training, have and continue to hinder women's political participation. Nonetheless, in the last 50 years, the CCP promulgated legislation that stated 10% of provincial, municipal and county-level leadership was set aside for women. Quotas are rarely met due to deep-seated preference for men based on cultural biases and state-backed push for traditional gender norms.

Women in China have better chances of being promoted with an intellectual and ethnic minority background. This reveals the prejudice held by many Chinese female and male politicians, and demonstrates that the CCP advances the interests of marginalised groups. Women are primarily promoted as a token gesture rather than based on merit, such as men. However, it does not mean they are absent in provincial politics. Female politicians of ethnic backgrounds are more likely to be promoted to provincial leadership than their male counterparts. In 2018, 20% of women in provinces were from an ethnic minority background, twice as much as their male counterparts.

Nonetheless, challenges still hinder women's political careers in China. Once appointed, women only play an ornamental rather than substantial role in governance. They are often placed in roles overseeing what are considered softer areas – healthcare, education and culture. The lack of female provincial leaders reveals the crucial gendered dimension of Chinese politics.

Once employed, women are promoted more slowly and retire at an earlier age due to age discrimination. Studies have shown that they need to catch up in their careers quite early to be promoted more quickly than men in China. Only a handful have risen high through the rankings, notably Sun Chunlan, who was one of the only female leaders who served in every layer of the government up to the provincial level. Starting as a blue-collar worker in a factory, she presided over two predominant regional posts in Fujian and Tianjin provinces. Bar Sun, Chinese women have substantially been inadequately represented in China.

== National level ==
Broadly, the glass ceiling effect is "the unseen, yet unbreachable barrier that keeps minorities and women from rising to the upper rungs of the corporate or political ladder, regardless of qualifications or achievements." A phenomenon evident in Chinese national politics, since the CCP's initial governance women have experienced disproportionately low participation rates, particularly within higher political stratifications. This minimal national-level participation can be seen in bodies such as the NPC, which has since 1975 witnessed no significant growth in women's involvement nor participation, instead stagnating at a 22.5% female composition. Within higher capacity political bodies, such as the NPC standing committee, women constitute even less, at only 16.6% – evidencing a trend in declining percentages of female participation the more influential the political body.

This plateau, and women's clear inequity in power distribution, has been attributed to a range of institutional and societal factors such as: cultural expectations for women in the home, career structures forcing early retirement and education and socialisation discouraging political ambitions. In 2011, for example, more than half of surveyed people, 61.6% of men and 54.6% of women, agreed that "the field for men is in public and the domain for women is within the household." Considering the newfound emphasis on traditionalism by CCP general secretary Xi Jinping, compounded by limited numbers of pre-eminent female politicians in both current and past politics, it is rare to observe high-profile female success stories. Notably, for the first time since 1997, Xi unveiled an all-male Politburo. Despite China's minority quota system encouraging at least one woman in senior leadership at each level below the Politburo, providing a "small but steady" stream of candidates, without specific affirmative actions, women's participation has been effectively curtailed.

Despite this, there are some notable successes, one such being Sun Chunlan, the former vice premier and one of the few female members to reach the Politburo in recent years. Considered the highest-ranking female government official until March 2023 when she retired, Sun oversaw departments of health, education, sports and culture, and enacted COVID-19 response campaigns both in Wuhan, and nationally.

Research into existing Chinese affirmative actions, aimed at remedying these disparities, also revealed structural and procedural inadequacies. Vague and inexplicit implementation, alongside minimal policy supervision, has ensured the largely symbolic nature of political representational wins, such policies generally failing to bring substantial improvement to inclusion in power structures. The University of Nottingham China Policy Institute posited that to remedy this superficiality, indicators have shown a positive correlation between increased female representation and renewing focuses on gender-specific affirmative action, to target higher functioning government bodies.

== Hong Kong and Macau ==
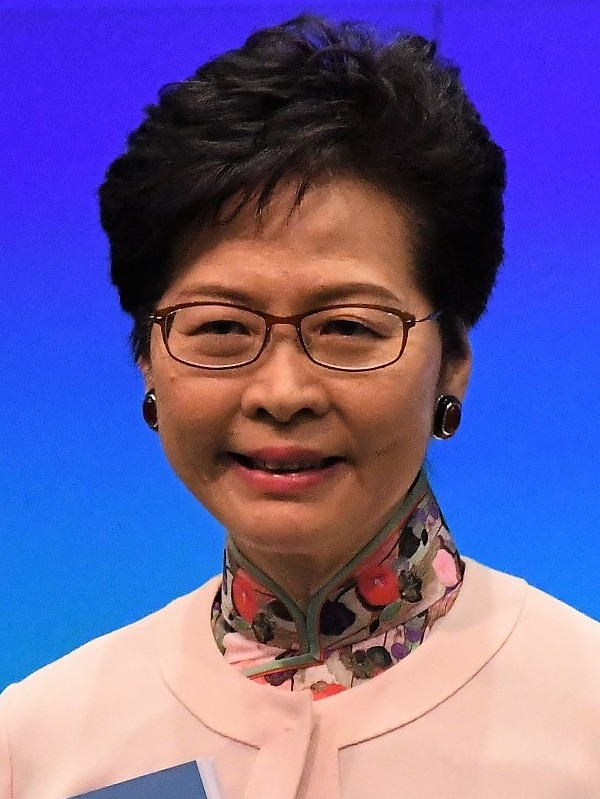
Carrie Lam, first female Chief Executive of Hong Kong

Upon the handover of Hong Kong's sovereignty from the UK to China in 1997, two women held top posts in the government in 1997, Chief Secretary for Administration Anson Chan and Secretary of Justice Elsie Leung. Chan was a holdover from the colonial government, and was the first ethnic Chinese and first woman to hold the second-highest post in the government. In 1998, Rita Fan became the first President of the Legislative Council since the handover.

Carrie Lam, Hong Kong's first female Chief Executive, began her career as a civil servant in 1980, and developed a reputation of being a "good fighter" for not backing down in bureaucratic fights. In 2007, she entered the cabinet as the Secretary for Development. She then took up the position of Chief Secretary of Administration in 2012. In 2017, she was elected Chief Executive by the 1194-member election committee. Throughout her career she presented herself as an administrator rather than a politician, and early in her tenure, a unifying figure. However, her tenure was marred by protests between 2019 and 2020 in opposition to the proposed bill that allowed for extraditions between Hong Kong and China, which critics feared would erode Hong Kong's separate judicial system. Lam ultimately withdrew the bill, but the protestors and pro-democracy lawmakers also demanded her resignation. She did not seek a second term in 2022; subsequently, John Lee became the fifth Chief Executive of Hong Kong.

In Macau, women's rights and interests are protected by the Basic Law. Upon the handover of sovereignty from Portugal to China in 1999, Florinda Chan became the Secretary for Administration and Justice.
