= Luo Heng (politician) =

Chinese politician

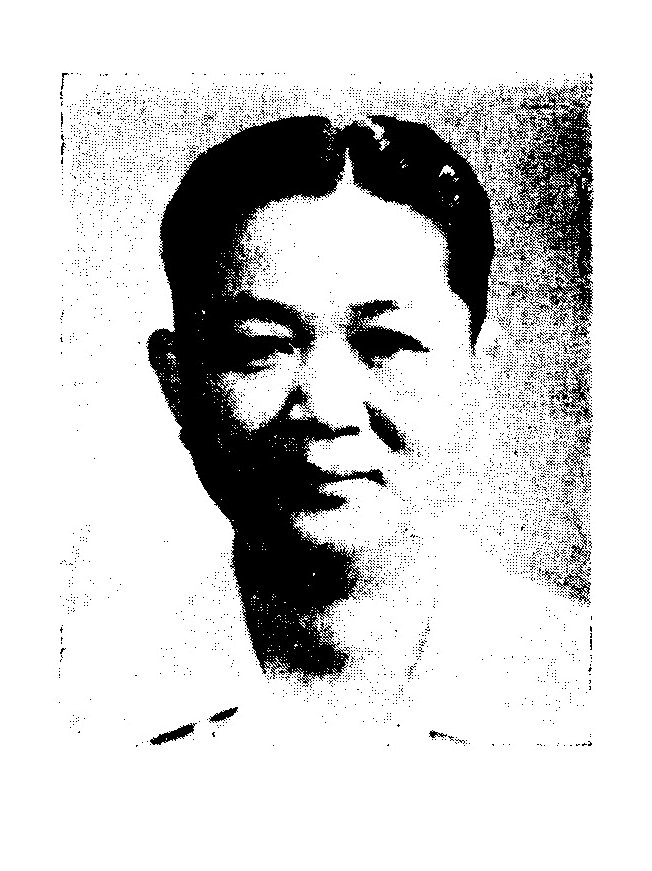

Member of the Legislative Yuan
- In office 1948–1984
- Constituency: Yunnan

Personal details
- Born: 6 October 1911 Yanfeng County, China
- Died: 20 February 1984 (aged 72)

Luo Heng (Chinese: 羅衡, 6 October 1911 – 20 February 1984) was a Chinese politician. She was among the first group of women elected to the Legislative Yuan in 1948.

== Biography ==
Luo was born Luo Yunying in Yanfeng County in Yunnan Province. She attended a private school in Shiyang and a Girls' Normal School in Kunming. After finishing school, she attended a women's teaching college. Her parents arranged a marriage, but she refused. When her parents sent people to Kunming to bring her back, she changed her name to Luo Heng, cut her hair short and began wearing men's clothes. She fled to Vietnam and travelled to Peking via Hong Kong and Shanghai, where she unsuccessfully attempted to find her brother Luo Jiakai, who was studying at Peking University. She never married and continued to wear men's clothing for the rest of her life.

She began studying at Peking China University, where she became an admirer of Sun Yat-sen. When the Kuomintang began organising for the Northern Expedition in Guangzhou, Luo travelled to the city and requested to be admitted to the women's workshop. However, she was rejected due to her wearing men's clothes. Her argument with the workshop leader was overheard by Soong Ching-ling, who arranged for Luo to enter the training school. She was joined by another brother Jiamo, who was also fleeing an arranged marriage. After graduating from the school, she joined the Northern Expedition, engaging in propaganda work. In 1927 the Kuomintang sent her back to Yunnan to organise the provincial branch of the party. She subsequently relocated to Nanjing to work in the party's central office, where she became the personal secretary of Soong Mei-ling.

In 1929 Luo travelled to France, where she studied at the University of Paris. She returned to China in 1938 and during the Second Sino-Japanese War was given responsibility for looking after invalids and became dean of the Nanjing School in Kunmin. After the war she was a delegate to the 1946 Constituent National Assembly that drew up the constitution of the Republic of China. She subsequently ran as a Kuomintang candidate in Yunnan in the 1948 elections to the Legislative Yuan, and was elected to parliament. She relocated to Taiwan during the Chinese Civil War, where she remained a member of the Legislative Yuan until her death in 1984.
