= Honorary titles of China =

Honorary titles are honorary awards granted by government agencies of China to individuals or collectives.

== History ==
Before the establishment of the Chinese Communist Party and state's system for awarding honors and awards in 2017, the state constitution and some related laws formulated a principled plan for the methods of awarding honorary titles, which mainly consisted of the following aspects:

- National honorary titles: Articles 67 and 80 of the Constitution of China stipulate that they shall be conferred by the President of China in accordance with the decision of the Standing Committee of the National People's Congress. In other words, other central government agencies do not have the power to confer national honorary titles.
- National-level honorary titles: awarded by the Central Committee of the Chinese Communist Party, the National People's Congress, and the State Council.
- Local honorary titles at all levels: Article 44 of the Law of the People's Republic of China on the Organization of Local People's Congresses and Local People's Governments at All Levels stipulates that local honorary titles at the county level and above shall be granted by the Standing Committees of the People's Congresses at all levels.
- Military honorary titles: The honorary titles of military personnel and units are determined by the Central Military Commission in accordance with the conditions of the Disciplinary Regulations of the Chinese People's Liberation Army.
- People's Police Honorary Titles: The honorary titles of individual and collective people's police officers shall be granted by the public security organs in accordance with the conditions of the People's Police Law of the People's Republic of China.
- Honorary titles in the health system: The national health system collective and individual honorary titles are awarded in accordance with the conditions of the Provisional Regulations on Honorary Titles in the National Health System.
- Honorary titles for civil servants: Honorary titles for individual civil servants and collectives are awarded in accordance with the conditions of the Civil Servant Law of the People's Republic of China and the Provisions on Awards for Civil Servants (Trial Implementation).
- Honorary titles of the people: There are no nationally unified regulations for honorary titles of the people, and the conditions for granting them are determined by the local people's governments themselves.

On 14 December 2015, the Politburo of the Chinese Communist Party reviewed and approved the Opinions on Establishing and Improving the System of Commendation and Recognition for Meritorious Service in the Party and the State. On 25 December 2015, the CCP Central Committee issued the Opinions on Establishing and Improving the System of Commendation and Recognition for Meritorious Service in the Party and the State. On 27 December 2015, the 18th meeting of the Standing Committee of the 12th National People's Congress passed the Law of the People's Republic of China on National Medals and National Honorary Titles, establishing national honorary titles. The law came into effect on 1 January 2016. In April 2016, the CCP Central Committee decided to establish the Working Committee on Party and State Merit and Honor Commendation, "responsible for coordinating the work of commendation and recognition for meritorious service in the Party and the State". In July 2017, the Regulations on Commendation of Meritorious Service and Honors within the Chinese Communist Party, Regulations on Commendation of Meritorious Service and Honors of the State, Regulations on Commendation of Meritorious Service and Honors of the Army, Measures for Granting the Medal of the Republic and National Honorary Titles, Measures for Granting the July 1st Medal, Measures for Granting the August 1st Medal, and Measures for Granting the Friendship Medal, all formulated by the Party and State Meritorious Service and Honors Commendation Committee, were approved and implemented by the CCP Central Committee. The system of commendation of meritorious service and honors of the Party and the State was thus established. This system includes four levels: medals, honorary titles, commendations and awards, and commemorative medals. Among them, honorary titles are divided into:

- National honorary titles: In accordance with the Law of the People's Republic of China on National Medals and National Honorary Titles, the Regulations on National Meritorious Service and Honors, and the Measures for Granting the Medal of the Republic and National Honorary Titles, these titles are awarded to outstanding individuals who have made significant contributions and enjoy high prestige in various fields and industries such as economy, society, national defense, diplomacy, education, science and technology, culture, health, and sports. They are generally given titles such as "People's Hero", "People's Guardian", "People's Scientist", "People's Artist", and "People's Educator".
- Honorary titles conferred by the CCP Central Committee, the State Council and the Central Military Commission: In accordance with the "Regulations on Commendation and Recognition of Meritorious Service in the Chinese Communist Party", the "Regulations on Commendation and Recognition of National Meritorious Service", and the "Regulations on Commendation and Recognition of Military Meritorious Service", these titles are conferred on individuals and collectives who have made outstanding contributions to the coordinated promotion of the "Four Comprehensives" strategic layout, the construction and defense of socialism with Chinese characteristics, have a noble spirit and demeanor, and have performed particularly outstandingly and whose deeds are particularly touching in the work of disaster relief, handling emergencies or completing major special tasks.

On 17 September 2019, President Xi Jinping signed a presidential decree, awarding national medals and national honorary titles to 42 people in accordance with the decision of the 13th meeting of the Standing Committee of the 13th National People's Congress on awarding national medals and national honorary titles, of which 28 people received national honorary titles.
