= Soong Ching-ling =

Wife of Sun Yat-sen (1893–1981)

Rosamond Soong Ch'ing-ling OPC KGC
- 宋庆龄
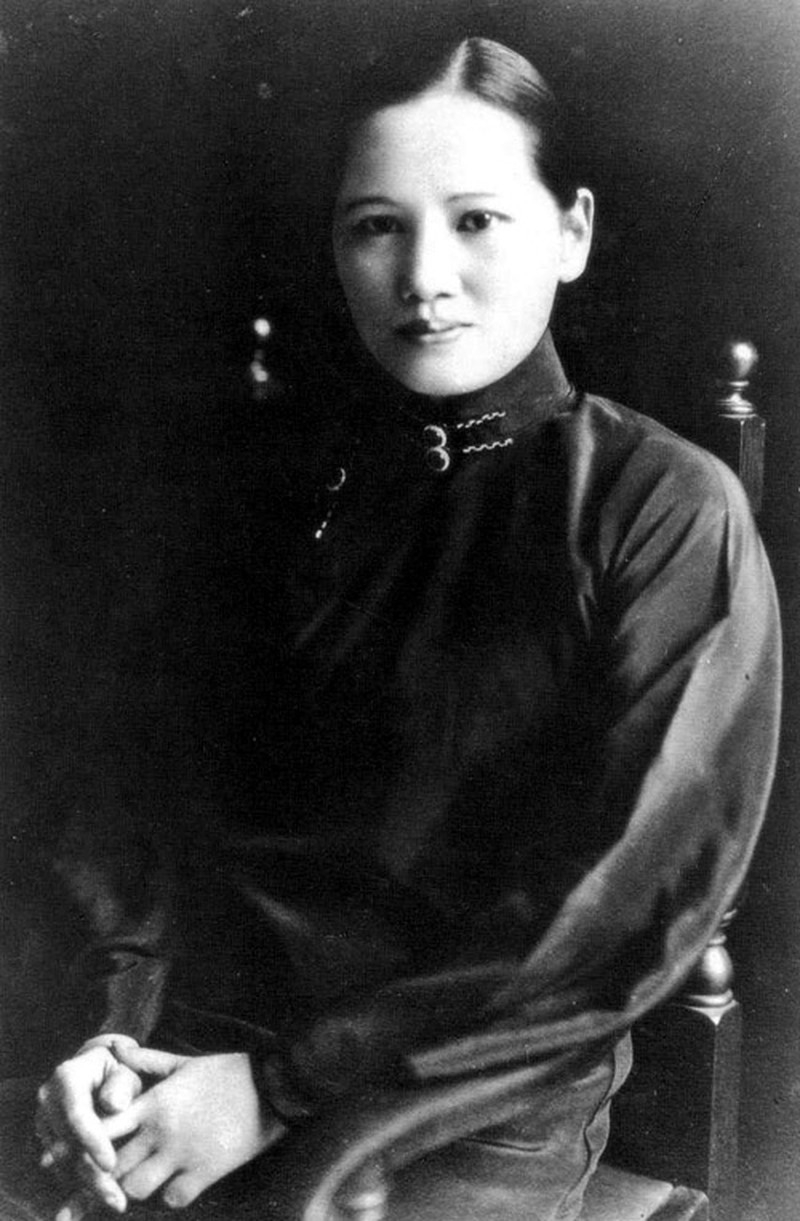
- Soong in 1941

Honorary Chairman of China
- In office 16 May 1981 – 29 May 1981
- Appointed by: the Standing Committee of the 5th National People's Congress on 16 May 1981
- Premier: Zhao Ziyang

Vice Chairman of China
- In office 27 April 1959 – 17 January 1975 Serving with Dong Biwu
- President: Liu Shaoqi; Vacant (after 1968)
- Preceded by: Zhu De
- Succeeded by: Ulanhu (1983)

Acting Chairman of China
- In office 31 October 1968 – 24 February 1972
- Premier: Zhou Enlai
- Preceded by: Liu Shaoqi (as Chairman)
- Succeeded by: Dong Biwu (as Acting Chairman)

Vice Chairman of the Standing Committee of the National People's Congress
- In office 17 January 1975 – 29 May 1981
- Chairman: Zhu De; Vacant^{[nb]} Ye Jianying
- In office 27 September 1954 – 28 April 1959
- Chairman: Liu Shaoqi

Vice Chairman of the Chinese People's Political Consultative Conference
- In office 25 December 1954 – 29 April 1959
- Chairman: Zhou Enlai

Vice Chairman of the Central People's Government
- In office 1 October 1949 – 27 September 1954 Serving with Zhu De, Liu Shaoqi, Li Jishen, Zhang Lan, Gao Gang
- Chairman: Mao Zedong

Personal details
- Born: 27 January 1893 Shanghai, China
- Died: 29 May 1981 (aged 88) Beijing, China
- Resting place: Mausoleum of Soong Ching Ling
- Party: Kuomintang (1919–1947); Revolutionary Committee of the Chinese Kuomintang (1948–1981); Chinese Communist Party (1981)
- Other political affiliations: Communist International (1930s–1943)
- Spouse: Sun Yat-sen (m. 1915; died 1925)
- Parent(s): Charlie Soong; Ni Kwei-tseng
- Relatives: Soong family Chiang family (by marriage); Kung family (by marriage)
- Education: McTyeire School for Girls; Wesleyan College (BA)

Chinese name
- Traditional Chinese: 宋慶齡
- Simplified Chinese: 宋庆龄
Transcriptions
Standard Mandarin
- Hanyu Pinyin: Sòng Qìnglíng
- Gwoyeu Romatzyh: Sonq Chinqling
- Wade–Giles: Sung^{4} Ch'ing^{4}-ling^{3}
- IPA: [sʊ̂ŋ tɕʰîŋ.lǐŋ]
Yue: Cantonese
- Yale Romanization: Sung Hing-lìhng
- Jyutping: Sung^{3} Hing^{3}-ling^{4}
- n.b. Between 1976 and 1978, Soong presided over the meeting of the National People's Congress Standing Committee and performed its powers as head of state in her capacity as the NPCSC First Vice Chairperson.

Soong Ch'ing-ling (Note: simplified Chinese: 宋庆龄; traditional Chinese: 宋慶齡; pinyin: Sòng Qìnglíng; Wade–Giles: sung⁴ ch'ing⁴ ling²) (27 January 1893 – 29 May 1981; Christian name Rosamonde or Rosamond) was a Chinese politician. She was the wife of Sun Yat-sen, therefore known by Madame Sun Yat-sen (Note: simplified Chinese: 孙夫人; traditional Chinese: 孫夫人; pinyin: Sūn Fūrén; Wade–Giles: sunfu jên²) and the "Mother of Modern China". A member of the Soong family, she and her family played a significant role in shaping the Republic of China. As a prominent leader of the left wing of the Kuomintang (KMT), she founded the Revolutionary Committee of the KMT. She entered the Communist government in 1949, and was the only female, non-Communist head of state of the People's Republic of China. She was named Honorary Chairman of the People's Republic of China and admitted to the Chinese Communist Party (CCP) a few weeks before her death in 1981.

Born in Shanghai and educated in the United States, she married Sun Yat-sen, the founder of the Republic of China and the KMT, as his third wife in 1915 and became a strong advocate for Sun's KMT-CCP coalition, opposing Chiang Kai-shek's split with the CCP in 1927. During the Second Sino-Japanese War she joined her sisters in China's wartime capital Chongqing to demonstrate national unity and support for the KMT-CCP alliance. However, during the subsequent Chinese Civil War she continued her support to the CCP, leading to a break in ties with her family. After the proclamation of the People's Republic of China (PRC) in 1949, she held several prominent positions in the Communist government, including Vice Chairman of the PRC (1949–1954; 1959–1975) and Vice Chairman of the Standing Committee of the National People's Congress (1954–1959; 1975–1981). She travelled abroad during the early 1950s, representing China at a number of international events.

Following the purge of President Liu Shaoqi in 1968, she and Dong Biwu as Vice Presidents became de facto Heads of State of China until 1972, when Dong was appointed Acting President. During the Cultural Revolution, Soong was protected from being purged, as the top name on A List of Cadres to Be Protected created by Zhou Enlai. Despite this, her Beijing home was invaded by Red Guards, and her parents' tombs in Shanghai were destroyed. Soong survived the political turmoil of the Cultural Revolution but appeared less frequently after 1976. As the acting Chairwoman of the Standing Committee of the National People's Congress from 1976 to 1978, Soong was again the acting Head of State, as the office of President had been abolished. During her final illness in May 1981, she was given the special title of "Honorary Chairman of the People's Republic of China".

== Names and titles ==
As with the Chinese naming tradition, Soong was the family name, Ching-ling was the first name. Her name is also rendered as Song Qingling in Pinyin. In some early literature, she was referred to as Chung-ling Song, a name she used during her time at Wesleyan. While studying there, she adopted the Christian name "Rosamonde" or "Rosamond." Ching-ling was named after Rosamonde Ricaud, the daughter of the Methodist minister who baptised her father in the United States in 1880. Among her close friends at Wesleyan, however, she was more commonly known as Suzie or Suzi.

After marrying Sun Yat-sen in 1915, she became known as Madame Sun Yat-sen. Her daughter-in-law and the wife of Sun Fo, Chen Suk-ying, preferred to be called Mrs Sun, rather than Madame Sun, to avoid confusion. As the wife and widow of the founder of the Chinese Republic, she was honoured as the "mother of modern China," by both major political parties in China, KMT and CCP. The KMT, which hailed Sun Yat-sen as the "father of the nation," extended this honour to her as "the mother of the nation." (Note: simplified Chinese: 国母; traditional Chinese: 國母; pinyin: guó mǔ; Wade–Giles: kuo² mu³) The CCP also occasionally used this title to refer to her. However, she was not Sun's only wife. Lu Muzhen was also sometimes described with the same term.

Following the Chinese Communist Revolution in 1949, she assumed a largely symbolic role in the Communist government in Beijing. Premier Zhou Enlai revered her as "the treasure of the country." She was awarded the title of the "Honorary Chairman of the People's Republic of China" in 1981 before her death.

== Early life and education ==
Soong Ching-ling was born in Shanghai, China on 27 January 1893, though the exact location of her birth remains debated. (Note: In 1985, Ni Jishi, a cousin of Soong, led a group of researchers to the Soong family residence at 628C Youheng Road in Hongkou, claiming it to be her birthplace, despite the building being constructed in 1912. Her sister Mei-ling also suggested that Hongkou was the likely location, though their parents had never explicitly told her. Soong had once told her live-in nannies that she was born on Nanshi Tiangua Street. However, the nannies were unable to locate this place in Nanshi. The Cultural Bureau of Chuansha County suggested that the confusion arose because her nannies misunderstood Soong's Shanghainese accent. They proposed that Soong was actually referring to Nanshidi Guo Street in Chuansha.) Her father, Charlie Soong, was a businessman and missionary originally from Wenchang, Hainan. Influenced by his uncle, who ran a grocery store in the United States, Charlie became enamoured with America when he was young. He was converted into Christianity in Wilmington, North Carolina in November 1880 and returned to China for missionary works in 1886. Her mother, Ni Kwei-tseng, was born in Shanghai to a missionary family originally from Yuyao, Zhejiang, which upheld a Christian tradition dating back to the Ming dynasty. She was educated at a high school run by American missionaries in Shanghai, where she met Charlie Soong. Married in 1890, the couple initially engaged in missionary work and business in Kunshan, later continuing their missionary efforts in Chuansha.

Charlie was deeply committed to education in the United States for his daughters. He wanted them to receive a Methodist education, so he enrolled them at McTyeire School for Girls in Shanghai, where Ching-ling studied from 1904 to 1907. Acting on the advice of his missionary friend William Burke, who had ties to the Mulberry Street United Methodist Church in Macon, Charlie sent his eldest daughter Ai-ling to Wesleyan College in 1904.

Ching-ling was among the first government-funded female Chinese students to study in the United States. The group, consisting of ten male and four female students, departed from Shanghai on 1 August 1907 and arrived in Seattle on 28 August, under the escort of Wen Bingzhong, the director of the Foreign Office of the Viceroy of Liangjiang. Ching-ling first attended school in Summit, New Jersey, to study Latin and French to fulfil Wesleyan's entrance requirements. She joined Ai-ling as a full-time college student at Wesleyan in the autumn of 1908, with their youngest sister Mei-ling accompanying them despite being only ten years old.

Although the Soong sisters spent most of their time on campus, they also travelled across the United States, navigating the prevailing anti-Chinese sentiments of the time. They were warmly received by local communities in the American South. In the summer of 1910, Ching-ling and Mei-ling attended summer school together at Fairmount College. In the summer of 1912, they participated in a church-sponsored YMCA conference in Montreat, North Carolina. During several Christmas holidays, they visited Washington, D.C., where they were hosted as guests of the Chinese ambassador.

== Leftist Kuomintang ==
=== Marriage to Sun Yat-sen ===
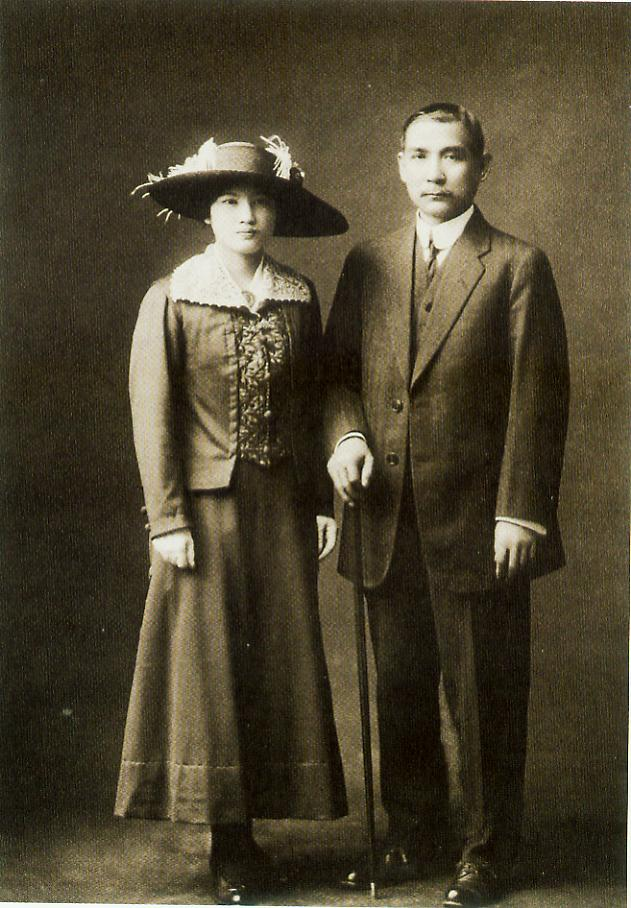
Sun Yat-sen and Soong Ch'ing-ling wedding photo (1915)

After graduating, Ching-ling's elder sister, Ai-ling, returned to Shanghai in 1908 and became the secretary to Sun Yat-sen. Sun became fascinated with Ai-ling, constantly gazing at her, although Ai-ling did not reciprocate his feelings in the same way. Ching-ling graduated from Wesleyan in 1913, and returned to China via Yokohama, Japan, where she met Sun. Ai-ling resigned in 1914 to marry H. H. Kung, passing the position on to Ching-ling, who admired Sun as the hero who founded the Chinese Republic. In the summer of 1915, Ching-ling returned to Shanghai, asking her parents for their permission to marry Sun, which shocked the family. She was 22 and he was 49 at the time. Ching-ling was confined at home in Shanghai, during which Sun divorced with his wife Lu Mu-zhen.

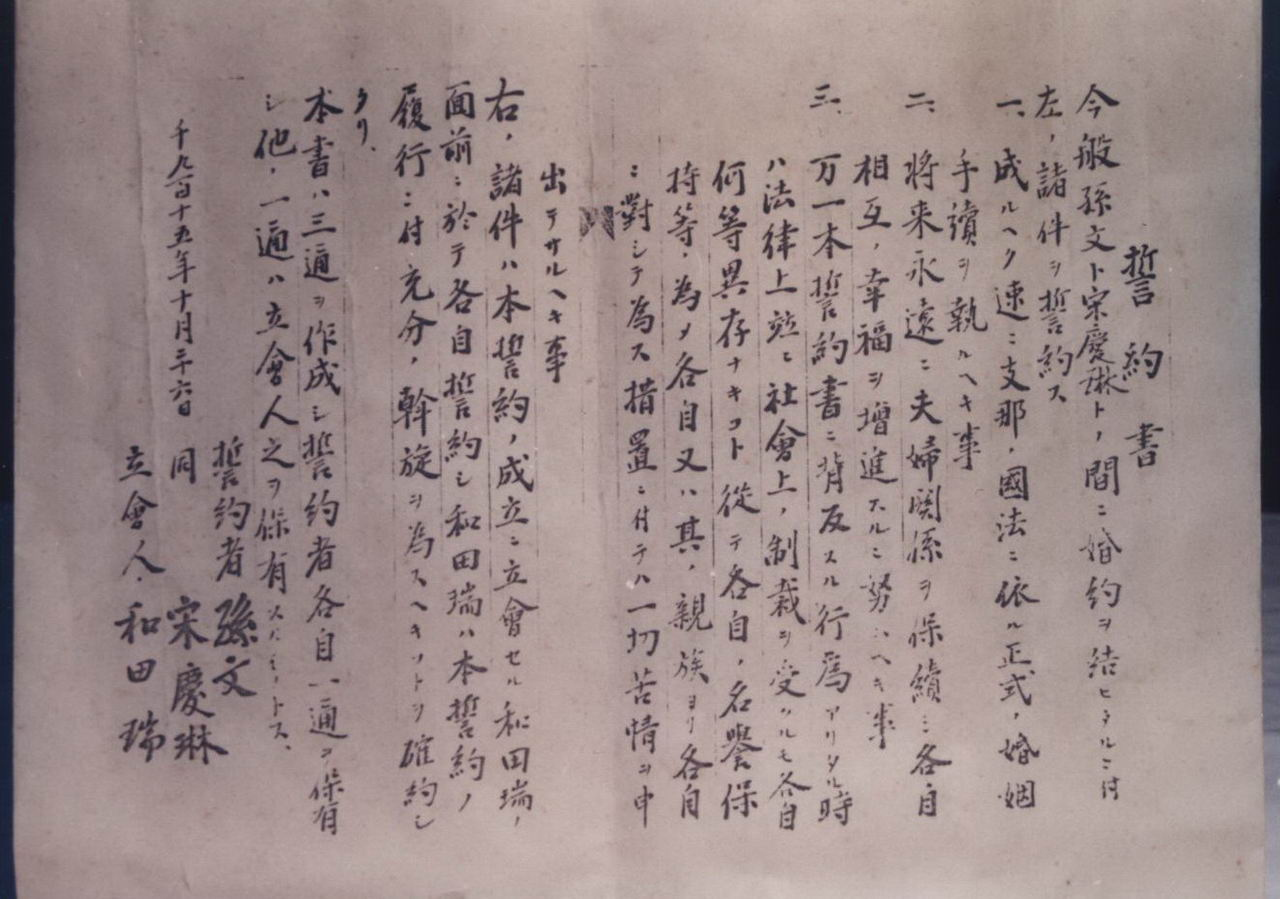
Sun Yat-sen and Soong Ching-ling's marriage oath (1915)

Despite objections from her father, Ching-ling married Sun Yat-sen on 25 October 1915. There were limited witnesses in their wedding ceremony in Tokyo, which included Wada Mizu, who provided his home for the wedding, Liao Zhong-kai and Liao's 11-year-old daughter Cynthia. The Soong family chased Ching-ling to Tokyo, attempting to dissuade her from the marriage, with her father Charlie even appealing to the Japanese government to denounce Sun. Additionally, many of Sun's colleagues did not acknowledge Ching-ling as his wife, referring to her as Miss Soong rather than Mrs Sun. As Ching-ling could only speak Shanghainese and English, her husband had to talk with her in English rather than Chinese.

==== 1916–1922: Guangzhou ====
Sun's political rival, Yuan Shikai, stepped down in 1916 following his short-lived attempt to restore the monarchy. In May of the same year, Sun and Ching-ling returned to Shanghai. In 1917, Sun travelled to Guangzhou to establish a rival government opposing Duan Qirui's Beijing government, while Ching-ling stayed behind in Shanghai. However, Sun's strong-handed policies alienated the new government in Guangzhou, leading to his expulsion and subsequent departure from the city. The couple began to live together in a large European-styled mansion in Shanghai French Concession.

In November 1920, Sun returned to Guangzhou with the support of local military leader Chen Jiongming to establish a new government. On 7 April 1921, he assumed the title of Grand President of the Republic of China, setting up a breakaway regime to oppose the internationally recognised government in Beijing.

However, on 16 June 1922, Chen Jiongming rebelled. During the uprising, Ching-ling chose to stay behind to cover Sun's escape, declaring, "China can do without me; it cannot do without you." During her own flight, Ching-ling suffered a miscarriage and was later informed that she would never be able to conceive again. Ching-ling, thereafter, became respected as Madame Sun Yat-sen.

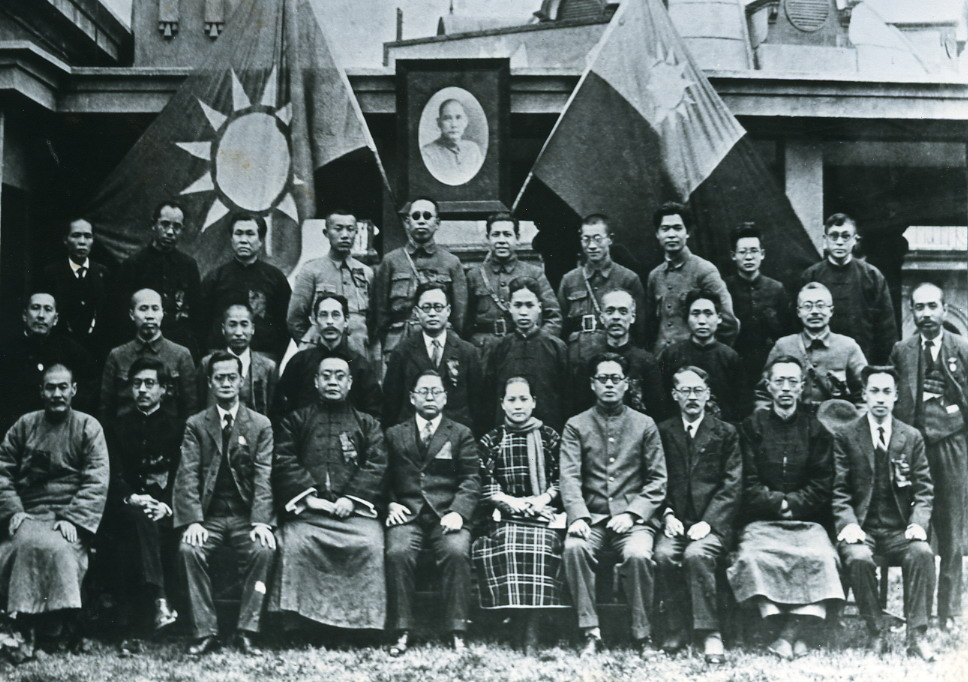
Third Plenary Session of the KMT Second Central Committee in Wuhan, March 1927. Soong Ching-ling is in the front next to her brother, T. V. Soong.

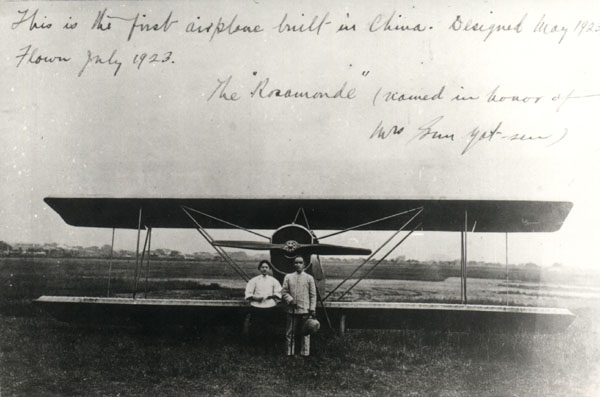
Mme. Soong Qingling and Dr. Sun Yat-sen seen here with the Rosamonde biplane; the first indigenously designed aircraft in China in which Mme. Soong would fly as a passenger with pilot Huang Guangrui at the controls.

==== 1923–1927: First United Front ====
Ching-ling made her way to Shanghai after Sun's escape, where the couple reunited. They met Soviet envoy Adolph Joffe, who had arrived in Shanghai in January 1923. Together, Sun and Joffe issued a joint declaration in which Joffe affirmed that communism or Soviet-style governance would not be imposed on China. Additionally, the Soviet Union pledged to relinquish the special privileges in China that had been inherited from Tsarist Russia. With renewed support in Guangzhou, Sun returned to establish his base once more. Like her husband, Ching-ling never publicly accepted communism.

During a visit to Sun's residence in Shanghai, Chiang Kai-shek encountered Ching-ling's younger sister, Mei-ling, for the first time and became enamoured with her. Subsequently, Chiang divorced his wife in Fenghua and sought Sun's counsel on pursuing Mei-ling. When Sun consulted Ching-ling on the matter, she expressed her strong disapproval. Sun then advised Chiang to wait, and Chiang obeyed.

In 1924, at the invitation of Feng Yuxiang, Sun and Ching-ling travelled to Beijing to negotiate a peace deal with the Beijing government. Sun Yat-sen fell gravely ill after arriving in Beijing on 31 December 1924. In his final days, he recognised that Ching-ling no longer loved him, though she wept uncontrollably and insisted that she still loved him. On 24 February 1925, Wang Jingwei, who was widely considered Sun's political heir, announced that all of Sun's belongings would be entrusted to Ching-ling and reaffirmed his commitment to the policies advocated by Soviet advisor Mikhail Borodin. In his last moments, Sun called out “darling,” prompting Ching-ling to cry so bitterly that she fainted. Ching-ling harboured distrust toward Wang Jingwei. Shortly after, her sisters arrived from Shanghai to offer her moral support and safeguard her interests.

After Sun's death in 1925, Ching-ling was elected to the KMT Central Executive Committee. In June 1925, she actively supported the Canton–Hong Kong strike, stating, "Follow the views of Dr. Sun and act according to his actions. If he knew about this, he would be pleased." She attended key meetings of the Kuomintang, including the Third Plenum in 1927. In 1927, Mei-ling married Chiang, who was about to launch a purge against the CCP.

=== Kuomintang-Communist split ===
On 14 July 1927, following Chiang Kai-shek and Wang Jingwei's announcements severing ties with the CCP, Soong Ching-ling issued a statement condemning the KMT-CCP split. She declared her intention to withdraw from politics until the KMT adopted a "wiser policy." Ching-ling viewed the alliance between the KMT and CCP as a cornerstone of her late husband's vision, and its dissolution as a betrayal. Nevertheless, she harboured concerns about the Communist influence within the alliance.

==== 1927–1928: Moscow ====
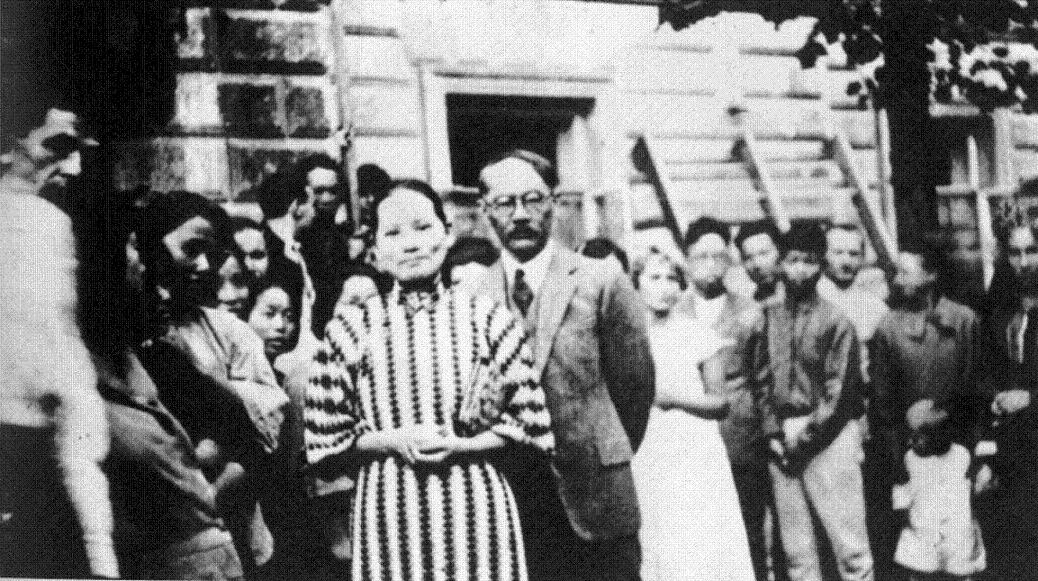
Soong Ching-ling with Eugene Chen in Moscow, 1927.

Ching-ling initially travelled from Wuhan to Shanghai, uncertain about whether to leave China. On the advice of Eugene Chen, she departed for Moscow in late August, intending to persuade the Soviet leadership to reaffirm their support for the KMT within the United Front. However, upon her arrival, they were caught in the conflict between Stalin and Trotsky. Stalin opposed efforts to overthrow Chiang Kai-shek, while Trotsky criticised the KMT as reflecting petty bourgeois values that undermined the prospects for land reform. Soong Ching-ling found herself unable to fully align with either side.

In Spring 1928, Soong Ching-ling and Eugene Chen visited Stalin at Kremlin. During the meeting, Stalin stated that they should return to China, leading the revolution, at which Ching-ling was disappointed, as she realised that Stalin was not interested in overthrowing Chiang Kai-shek.

==== 1928–1931: Berlin ====
Ching-ling arrived in Berlin on 1 May 1928, with assistance from the People's Commissariat for Foreign Affairs. She was accompanied by Deng Yanda, a leftist leader of the Kuomintang, and cared for by Zhang Ke, a researcher from the Moscow Sun Yat-sen University.

On 26 March 1929, the 3rd National Congress of the KMT passed a resolution inviting Soong Ching-ling to Nanjing for Sun Yat-sen's burial. She departed Berlin on 6 May, travelling via Moscow and Siberia, and arrived in Nanjing on 1 June. Ching-ling played a significant role in his funeral arrangements, escorting the coffin of her husband Sun Yat-sen to the Sun Yat-sen Mausoleum in Nanjing.

On 21 September 1929, she departed China by ship and returned to Berlin in mid-November. While in Berlin, she witnessed widespread unemployment and hyperinflation. She avoided contact with representatives of the KMT-led government, instead engaging with European labour movements and maintaining ties with major Communist organisations, despite the rising influence of the Nazis. However, she was displeased by rumours spread about her by local Chinese students.

In late April 1931, she received a telegram from home informing her of her mother's illness. Initially sceptical, she suspected it might be a ploy by the KMT to lure her back for their political purposes. To confirm the news, she wrote to a friend in China. She departed Berlin on 31 July 1931 to attend her mother's funeral.

==== 1931–1937: Shanghai ====
In 1931, Ching-ling returned to China from Germany, for her mother's funeral. She delivered the offer from Moscow to exchange Chiang Ching-kuo, the son of Chiang Kai-shek, for the arrested Soviet intelligence officer Jakob Rudnik. Chiang Kai-shek turned down this offer, although his wife Mei-ling wanted to agree. Ching-ling hereafter began working for Comintern. In May 1933, Ching-ling contacted Liao Chengzhi on behalf of Comintern to request intelligence from the CCP. In 1934, a memo of Comintern suggests that the local Soviet representative believed it was a mistake to admit her into the Communist Party, which made her lose her unique value.

After the Japanese invasion of Manchuria in 1931, Chiang adopted the slogan "first internal pacification, then external resistance," contending that warlords and the CCP had to be eliminated before the invading Japanese could be opposed. This policy of avoiding a frontal war against Japan and prioritizing anti-communist suppression was widely unpopular and provoked nationwide protests. Soong Ching-ling was among those who criticised the Nationalist government's position, stating that its policies stifled people's resistance.

With financial backing from the Comintern, Ching-ling maintained contact with Moscow through Agnes Smedley and Ruth Weiss. She played a key role in rescuing Communist leaders, including Chen Geng, Liao Chengzhi, and Chen Duxiu, and communicated with the CCP via her secretary Li Yun. She also provided Dong Jianwu with a special passport signed by Zhang Xueliang, enabling him to link Communist organisations in Shanghai and Shaanxi. At Mao Zedong's request, she sent doctor Ma Haide and journalist Edgar Snow to Yan'an Soviet. Few were aware that she was secretly acting as a Communist agent.

=== Second United Front ===
==== 1938–1940: Hong Kong ====
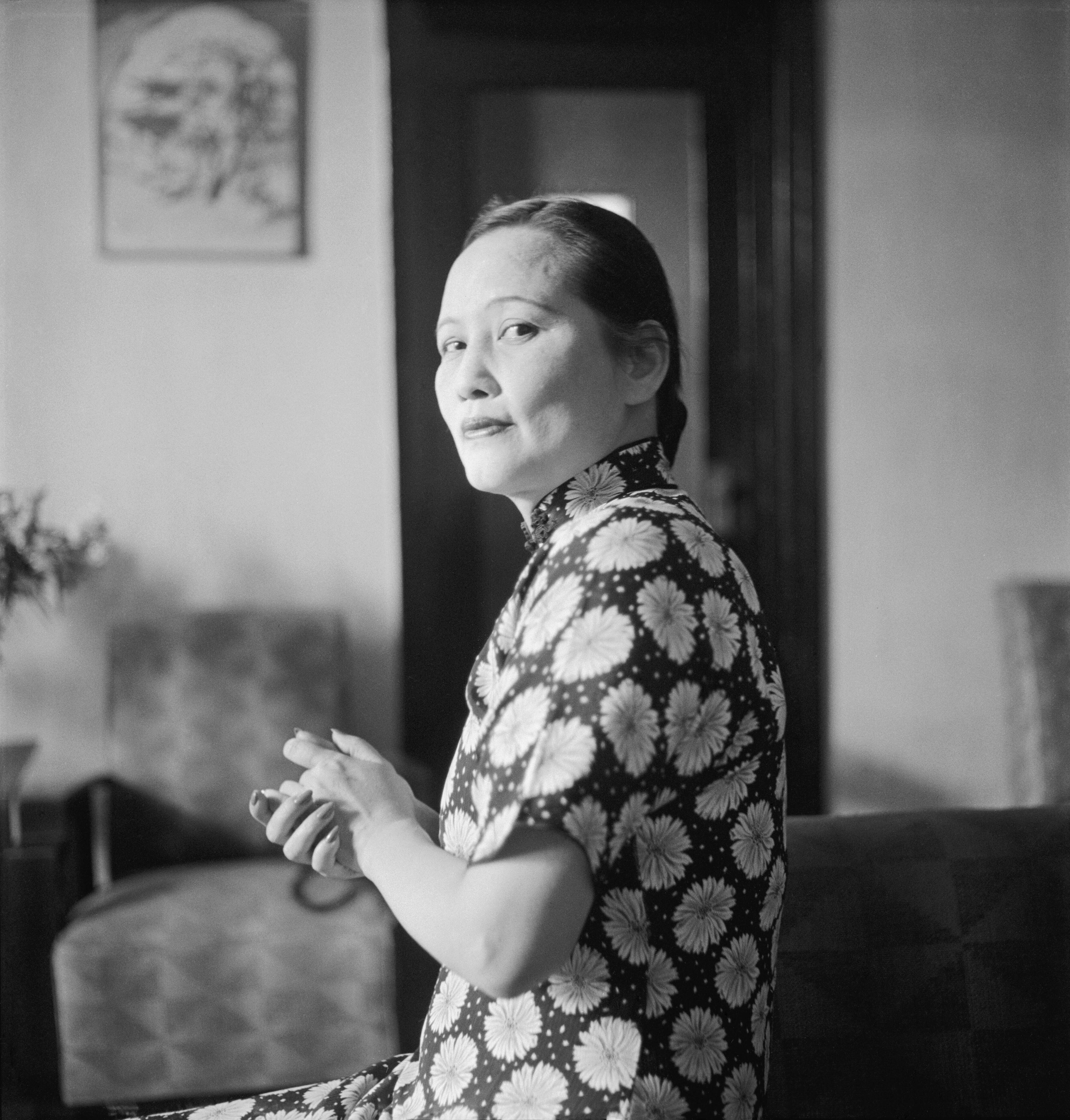
Soong Ching-ling in wartime capital Chongqing

On 23 December 1937, to evade Japanese aggression, Ching-ling moved from Shanghai to Hong Kong with her secretary Li Yun. She published influential articles, such as China Unconquerable, and penned letters appealing for global solidarity. In 1938, she founded the China Defence League in Hong Kong, aiming to garner international support for China's war effort. The organisation mobilised resources, provided humanitarian aid, and published newsletters to raise awareness globally.

==== 1940–1945: Chongqing ====
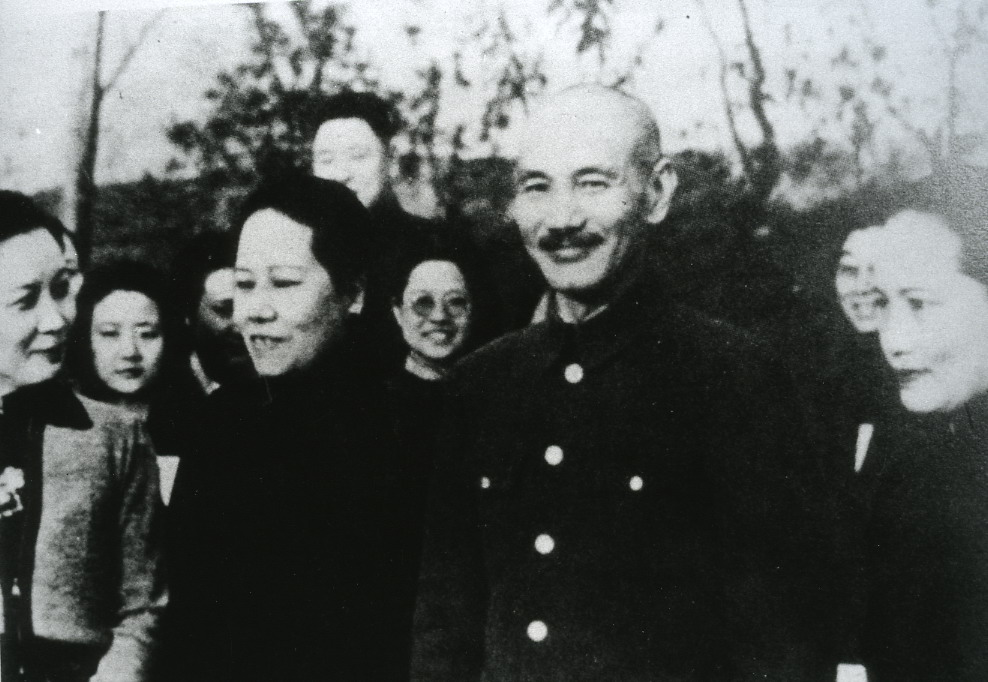
Soong sisters and Chiang Kai-shek in Chongqing (1942)

The three Soong sisters made public appearances in Hong Kong in favour of relief work until 1940, when the Japanese radio stated that they would evacuate rather than join the Chinese government in Chongqing to endure the war conditions. In response to this, they left for Chongqing, where they continued to appear to boost public morale touring hospitals, air-raid shelter systems and bomb sites during the war. They founded the Indusco organization to protect Chinese industry during wartime conditions, an organization in which Soong Ai-ling was most active of the sisters.

=== Communist revolution ===
In September 1945, Soong Ching-ling met Mao Zedong in Chongqing. By December, she had left Chongqing for Shanghai, where she restructured the China Defence League into the China Welfare Institute. The organisation continued its support for Communist groups and their army while also engaging in charitable activities for children and social welfare. On 23 July 1946, Ching-ling issued an open letter in Shanghai, advocating for a coalition government between the KMT and the CCP and calling for the cessation of American aid to the KMT. In 1948, she was named honorary chairwoman of the Revolutionary Committee of the KMT, a left-wing splinter group claiming to uphold Sun Yat-sen's legacy.

== People's Republic of China ==
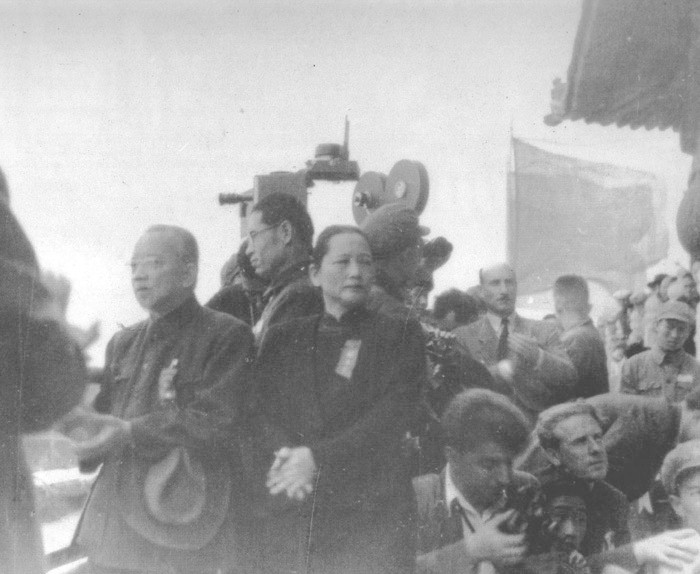
Soong Ching-ling and Li Jishen at the Founding Ceremony of the PRC (1949)

=== Coalition government ===
With the collapse of the Nationalist government and the Communist victory in the civil war, she left Shanghai in September 1949 to attend the Chinese People's Political Consultative Conference (CPPCC), convened in Beijing by the Chinese Communist Party to establish a new Central People's Government. On 1 October, she was a guest at the ceremony in Tiananmen Square marking the birth of the new People's Republic of China. The Nationalist government issued an order for her arrest, but this was soon blocked by the swift military victory of the Communists. The KMT fled from mainland China to Taiwan soon after this. In the founding Proclamation of the People's Republic of China Soong was the third person, after himself, that Mao named.

Soong was held in great esteem by the victorious Communists, who reckoned her as a link between their movement and Sun's earlier movement. After the formal establishment of the People's Republic of China in 1949, she became one of six vice chairs of the Central People's Government," and one of several vice-chairs of the Sino-Soviet Friendship Association.

In 1950, Soong became chair of the Chinese People's Relief Administration, which combined several organizations dealing with welfare and relief issues. Her China Welfare Fund was reorganized as the China Welfare Institute and began publishing the magazine China Reconstructs, now published as China Today. Soong intended for China Reconstructs to engage readers and intellectuals in the capitalist countries who might not be politically progressive, but who "pursued world peace."

In 1953, a collection of her writings, Struggle for New China, was published. In April 1951, it was announced that she had been awarded the Stalin Peace Prize for 1950. She donated her Stalin Award to China Welfare Institute, which was then used to establish International Peace Maternity And Child Health Hospital in Shanghai in 1952.

=== Vice-presidency ===
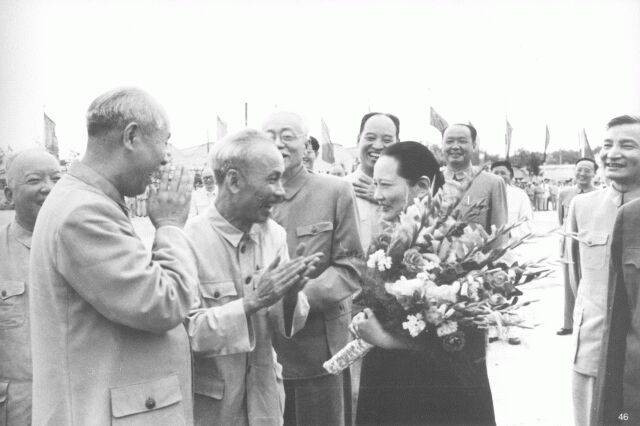
Song Ching-ling welcomes Ho Chi Minh to Beijing in 1956

==== 1950–1966: Communist government ====
In 1953 Soong served on the committees preparing for elections to the new National People's Congress and the drafting of the 1954 constitution. Soong was elected a Shanghai deputy to the first NPC, which adopted the constitution at its first meeting in September 1954. She was elected one of 14 vice-chair of the NPC's standing committee, chaired by Liu Shaoqi. In December of the same year, she was elected a vice-chair of the CPPCC, which became a consultative body, and replaced Liu Shaoqi as chair of the Sino-Soviet Friendship Association. During this period, Soong traveled abroad several times, visiting Austria, India, Burma, Pakistan, and Indonesia. Her trips included a January 1953 visit to the Soviet Union, where she was received by Stalin shortly before his death. She visited Moscow again in 1957 with Mao Zedong's delegation to the 40th anniversary of the Russian Revolution.

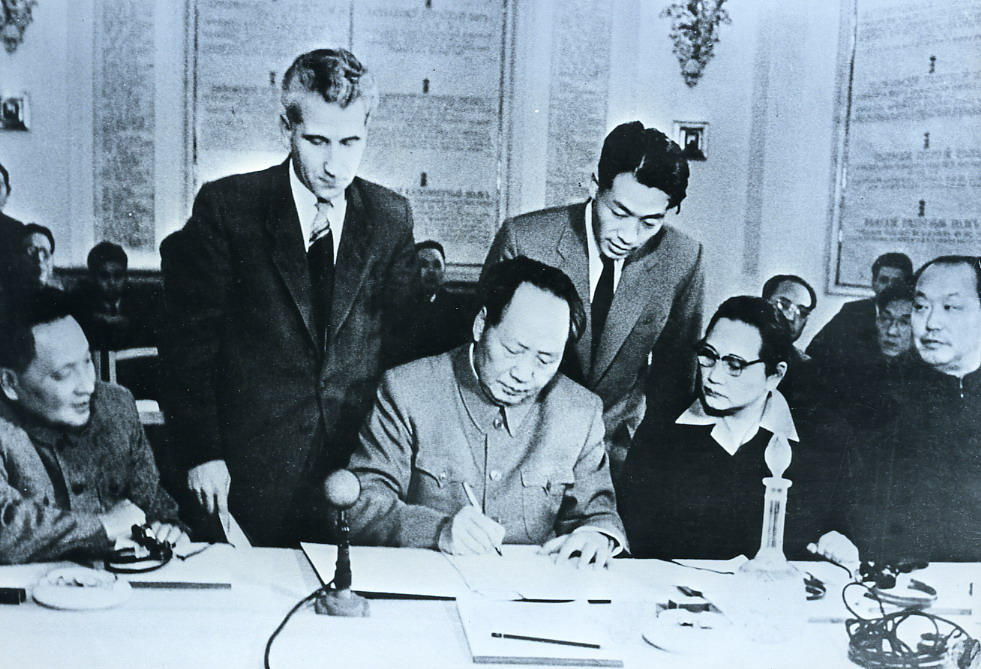
Mao Zedong, Soong Ching-ling and Deng Xiaoping at the 1957 International Meeting of Communist and Workers Parties

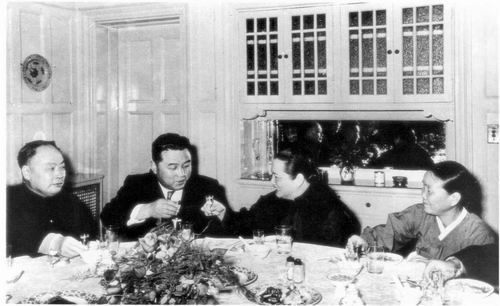
Soong Ching-ling with Kim Il Sung (1958)

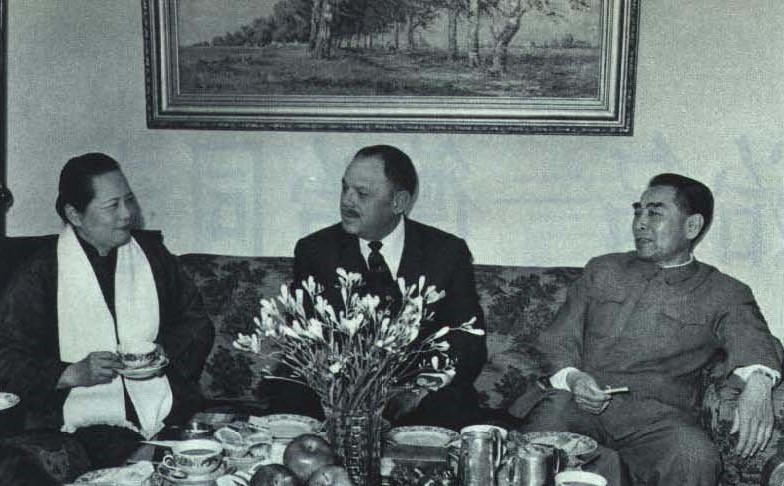
Soong Ching-ling with Zhou Enlai and Ayub Khan (1965)

In April 1959, Soong again served as a Shanghai deputy at the 2nd National People's Congress. At this Congress, Mao Zedong and Zhu De stepped down as president and vice-president of the People's Republic of China. Liu Shaoqi was elected State Chairman (President), and Soong Ching-ling and Dong Biwu, a senior Communist Party 'elder', were elected Vice President of China. Soong resigned at this time from her positions as vice-chair of the CPPCC National Committee and the NPC Standing Committee. She was re-elected to the post of vice-chair of the PRC at the Third National People's Congress in 1965, and appeared frequently in the early 1960s on ceremonial occasions, often greeting important visitors from abroad.

==== 1966–1976: Cultural Revolution ====
During the Cultural Revolution, Soong was heavily criticized by Red Guard factions, and in one incident, the marker of her parents' grave was toppled and their bodies exposed. Following this incident Premier Zhou Enlai recommended that Soong Ching-ling be put on a "List of Cadres to be protected." Zhou's recommendation was approved by Mao Zedong. Mao Zedong sent his wife, Jiang Qing, to visit Soong and explain the purpose of the "Cultural Revolution." In response, Soong remarked that it should, above all, avoid harming the innocent, which embarrassed Jiang.

Despite Soong's support of the CCP, she was skeptical of some radical actions such as the purging of capitalists and party moderates such as Liu Shaoqi from the government. Soong wrote seven letters to criticize the Cultural Revolution Campaign and objected to the excessive violence against her colleagues and other moderates within the CCP. In her letters with friends, Soong called Jiang a "queen" and "shameless bitch." Late in the Cultural Revolution, during the 4th NPC which approved the 1975 Constitution in January 1975, Soong's term as Vice President of China ended with the abolition of that post, after which she was again appointed one of the vice-chairwomen of the NPC Standing Committee.

==== 1976–1981: Final years ====
Soong Ching-ling moved to her Shichahai residence in Beijing, where she penned several articles commemorating late Chinese leaders Mao Zedong and Zhou Enlai. In November 1980, she wrote to the CCP Central Committee, urging the Party to reflect on the suffering it had inflicted on the people during past political movements. She also requested that her name not be equated with the Father of the Nation Sun Yat-sen, expressing her belief that she was unworthy of such an honour.

== Death and funeral ==
In the spring of 1981, Soong Ching-ling was diagnosed with leukemia. Her last public appearance was on 8 May 1981, when she appeared in a wheelchair at the Great Hall of the People to accept an honorary LL.D. degree from the University of Victoria. A few days later she began running a high fever and was unable to rise again.

=== Honorary presidency ===
Soong Ching-ling had wanted to join the Chinese Communist Party as early as 1957. However, when she asked Liu Shaoqi for permission to join the party, the request was turned down because "it was thought better for the revolution that she not join formally, but that she would thenceforth be informed, and her opinion sought, concerning all important inner-Party events matters, not only those involving the government."

When she fell in 1981, Wang Guangmei, the widow of Liu Shaoqi, visited her and later approached Hu Yaobang to ask if Soong could be admitted to the CCP. Hu agreed to consider the case, and Wang returned to Soong's residence to confirm her interest in joining the CCP. Soong nodded in affirmation. Wang then relayed Soong's wishes to Hu Yaobang. On 16 May 1981, she was admitted to the CCP and named Honorary Chairman of the People's Republic of China. She is the only person to ever hold this title. Song Renqiong and Liao Chengzhi visited Soong in the hospital and informed her of the Politburo's decision, first in Chinese and then in English for confirmation.

=== Death ===
Before her death, more than 50 party and state leaders, along with relatives from overseas and close friends, gathered at her bedside to pay their final respects. Her family sent a telegram to Mei-ling, hoping for a reunion. Mei-ling responded, suggesting that Ching-ling be sent to New York, United States instead. According to Xinhua News Agency, Soong Ching-ling died from chronic lymphocytic leukaemia at 8:18 p.m. on 29 May 1981 in Beijing. Xinhua described her death as "a great loss to the country and the people." Despite invitations, Mei-ling chose to remain at home in Taiwan, reportedly due to political sensitivities. A potential family reunion in Beijing was seen as a threat to the legitimacy of her stepson, Taiwanese President Chiang Ching-kuo. Xinhua said that other family members were present at the time of Soong's death.

After she died world leaders expressed their condolences. United States President Ronald Reagan extended "the sympathy of the American people and my personal condolences," highlighting Soong Ching-ling's significant contributions as Sun Yat-sen's private secretary, political advisor, and wife, as well as their early life in the United States. Soviet head of state Leonid Brezhnev offered "profound condolences," a term stronger than that used upon Mao Zedong's death, acknowledging her role as honorary chair of the Sino-Soviet Friendship Association.

=== State funeral ===
The Chinese government declared three days of mourning, ordered flags to be lowered at Chinese embassies worldwide, and held a state funeral for Soong on 3 June. Again, the funeral services extended an invitation to Soong Ching-ling's family to attend the ceremony in Beijing. Although Mei-ling mourned her sister privately, she wrote to Chiang Ching-kuo, stating that despite their familial bond, she had decided not to travel to Beijing.

Hosted by Hu Yaobang, who was widely expected to become the next chairman of the CCP, the televised mourning ceremony at the Great Hall of the People in central Beijing drew over 10,000 attendees. Notable participants included Hua Guofeng, Deng Xiaoping, and Ye Jianying. In his eulogy, Deng Xiaoping mentioned that Soong, the aunt of then-President of Taiwan Chiang Ching-kuo, had expressed hope for reunification talks between the governments of Beijing and Taipei in the near future.

=== Resting place ===
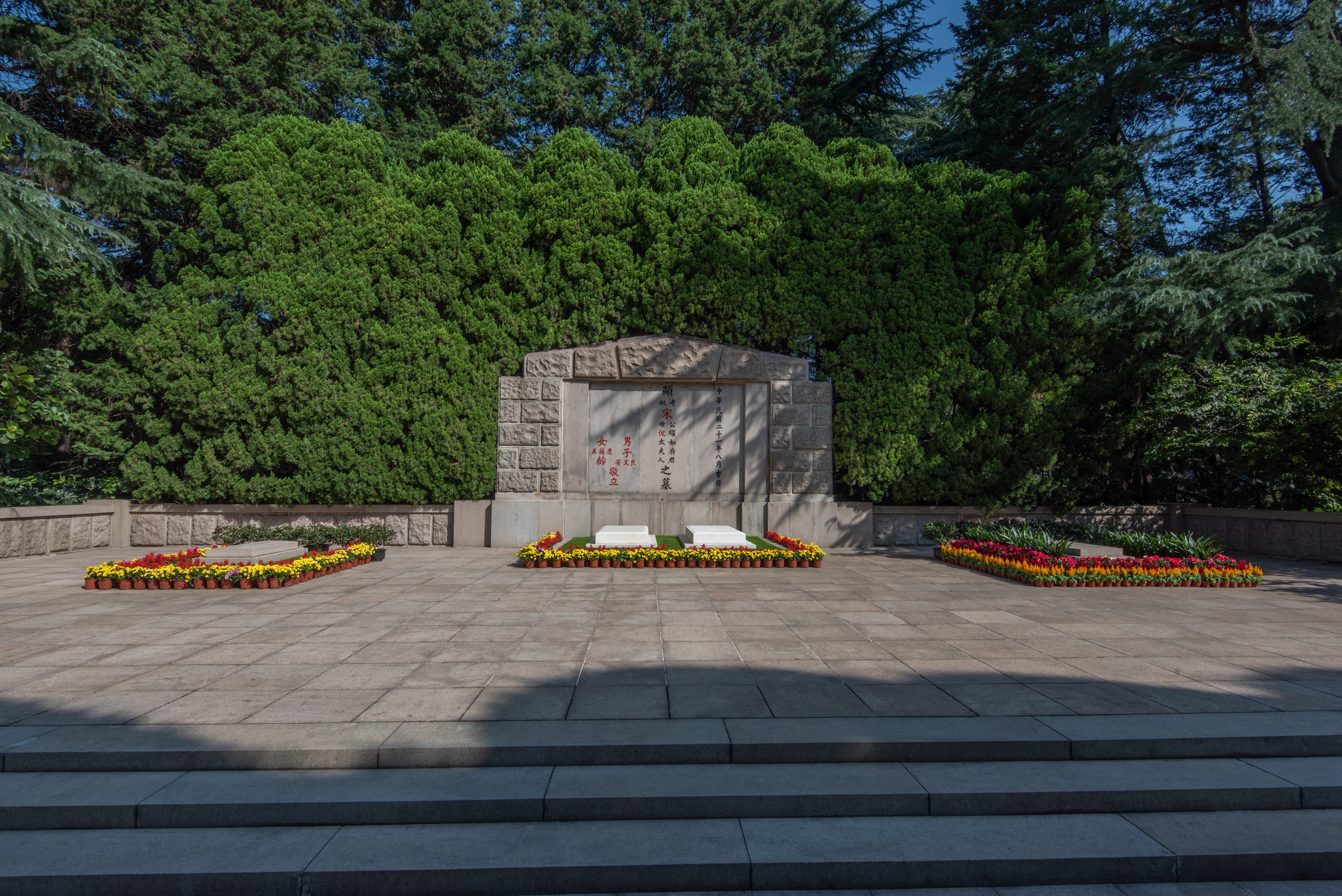
Soong family tomb in Shanghai

In accordance with her wishes, Soong Ching-ling's cremated remains were interred alongside her parents in the restored Soong family burial plot at Shanghai's International Cemetery, later renamed the Soong Ching Ling Mausoleum in her honour. She was laid to rest beside her parents, Charlie Soong and Ni Kwei-tseng, with the names of their children—T.V. Soong, T.L. Soong, T.A. Soong, Ai-ling Soong, Ching-ling Soong, and Mei-ling Soong—engraved on the tombstone.

== Legacy ==
=== Public image ===
According to French historian Bernard Brizay, Soong Ching-ling stood out from the traditional female archetype. Despite her youthful, gentle, and kind appearance, she was remarkably strong-willed, which inspired Sun Yat-sen during his lowest moments. When asked if she loved her husband, she famously replied that her love was for the Chinese Communist Revolution. After her husband's death, she could have withdrawn from politics, yet she steadfastly committed herself to fulfilling his revolutionary ideals, even in the face of death threats. In contrast, Brizay also noted her relatively muted response to the Cultural Revolution, which he referred to as a "tragedy" and "scar".

The CCP still treats Sun Yat-sen as one of the founders of their movement. They claim descent from Sun, who is viewed as a proto-communist, and the economic element of Sun's ideology was socialism. Brizay noted that Soong Ching-ling did not like Mao Zedong but maintained a good relationship with Zhou Enlai, who she accompanied during his visits abroad. During Mao's era, Jiang Qing envied Soong's greater popularity among the people, while Soong wrote letters criticizing the excesses of the Cultural Revolution. After her death, the Communist government praised her as "a great patriotic, democratic, internationalist and Communist fighter and an outstanding state leader of China," and also "a seasoned pioneer in the defence of world peace, and an exemplary member of the Chinese Communist Party." (Note: Chinese: 宋庆龄是爱国主义、民主主义、国际主义和共产主义的伟大战士，杰出的国际社会活动家，保卫世界和平久经考验的前驱，中国共产党的优秀党员。)

In Taiwan, it was until 1965 when there was the first biography in Taiwan to mention Soong Ching-ling as the wife of Sun Yat-sen. The majority of people, except for those who had fled from the mainland, were unaware of Soong Ching-ling until the lifting of martial law in 1987, despite the widespread personality cult surrounding Sun Yat-sen. During the period of time, textbooks in Taiwan referred to Sun's wife as Lu Muzhen. Soong Mei-ling criticised her sister Ching-ling for "being disloyal to her country, lacking benevolence to the people, failing to fulfil filial piety to her parents, showing infidelity in her marriage, neglecting righteousness to her relatives and friends, disregarding greater justice, showing no reverence for heaven and earth, offering no remonstrance to tyrants, and failing to pacify citizens". (Note: Chinese: 二姐生性好强，一生每逢大事必糊涂，最终于国未尽忠，于民不称仁，于父母未尽孝，于夫妻未尽节，于亲朋未尽义，于大义未尽思，于天地无一敬，于暴君未尽谏，于凶民未尽抚。可不悲哉！)

=== Former residence ===
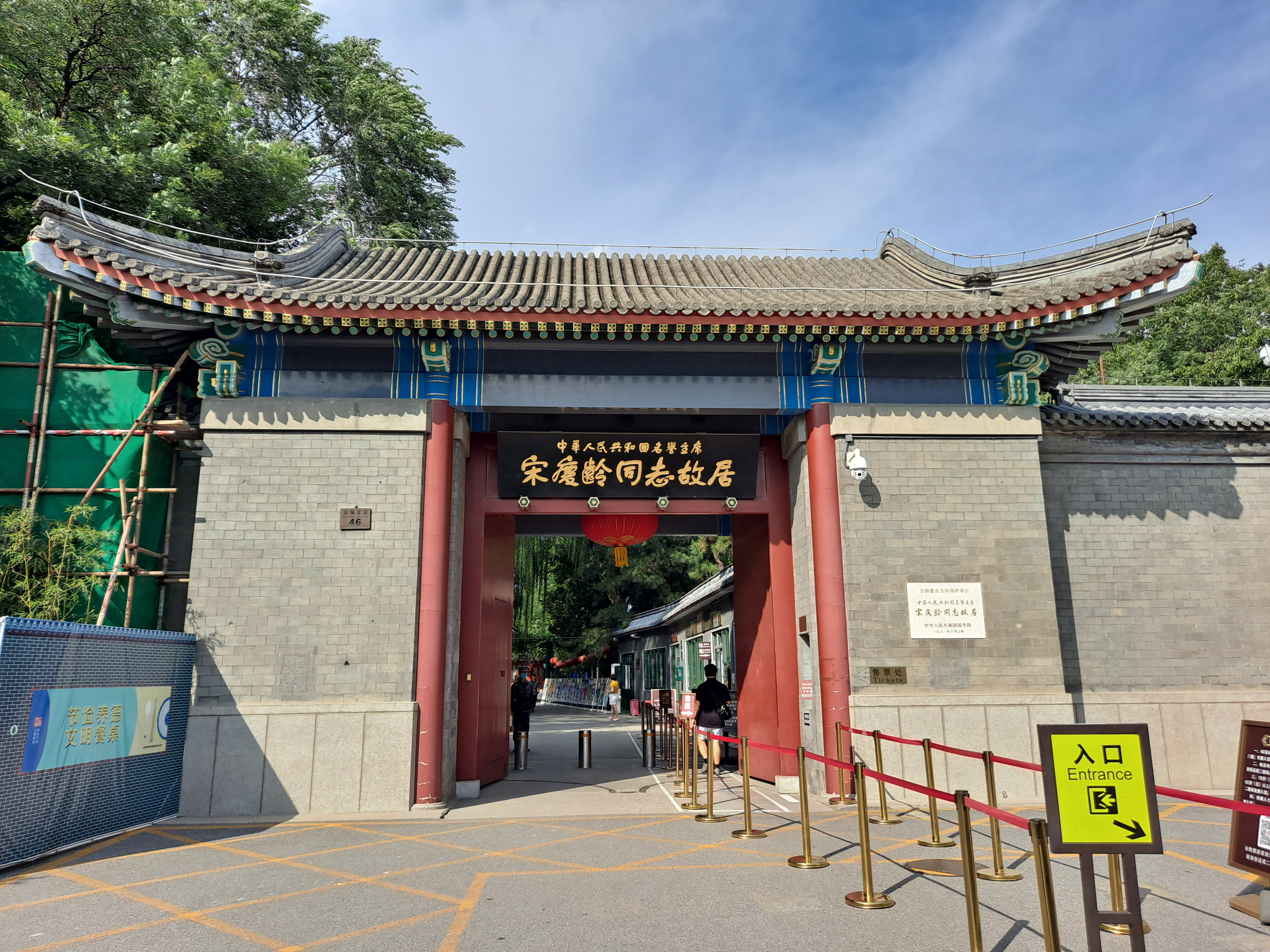
Former Residence of Soong Ching-ling in Beijing

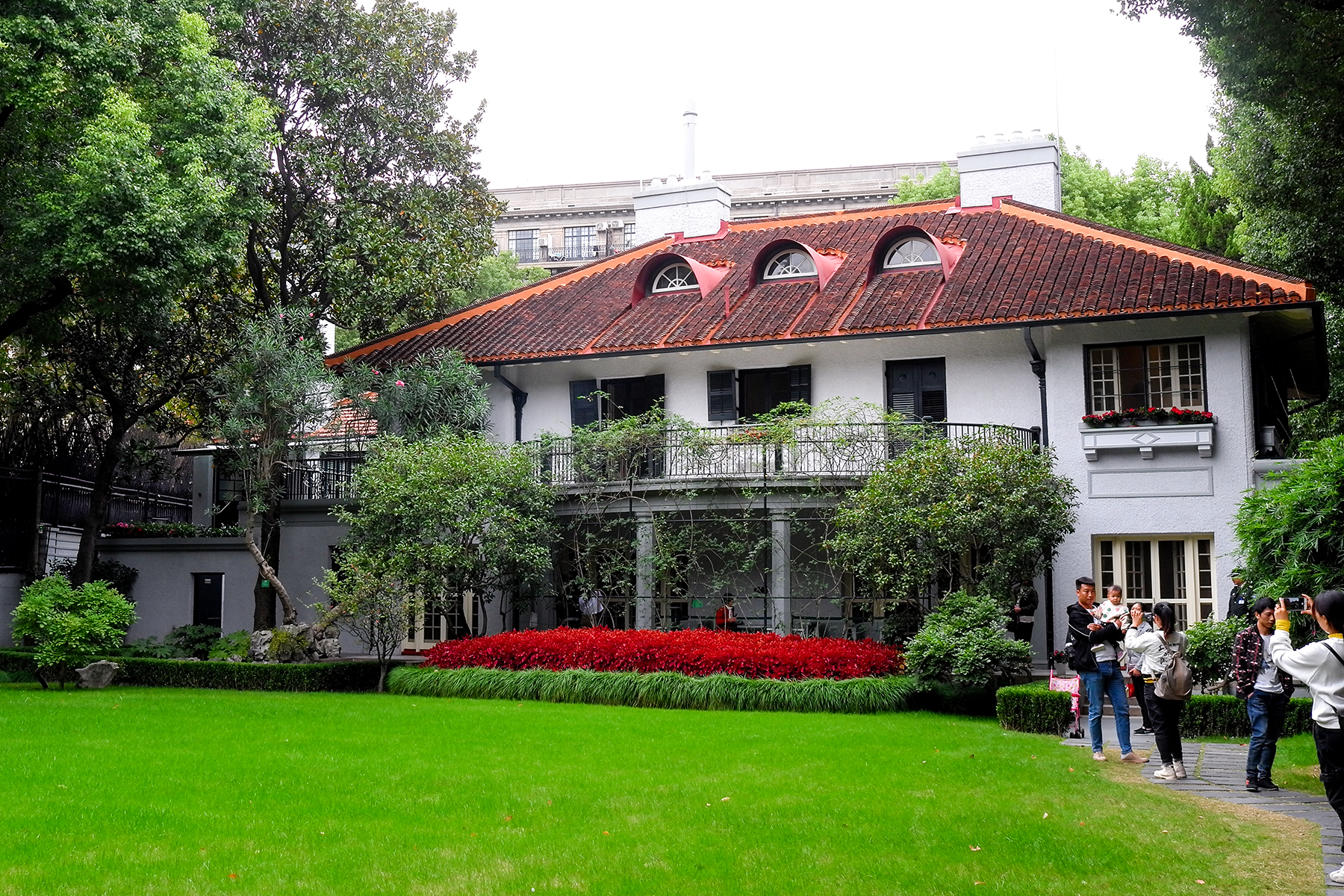
Soong Ching-ling Memorial Residence in Shanghai

Several of Soong Ch'ing-ling's former residences have also been transformed into museums:

- In 1918, Soong and her husband Sun Yat-sen lived in a house in the French Concession of Shanghai. After her husband's death, Soong continued to reside there until 1937. The house has now been converted into a museum dedicated called the Former Residence of Sun Yat-sen. Though dedicated primarily to Sun, it also contains some of Soong's artefacts during their life together.
- From 1948 to 1963 Soong Ching-ling lived in the western end of the French Concession in Shanghai. This building is now the Soong Ching-ling Memorial Residence. A memorial hall containing some of her belongings and photographs stands near the entrance. The main building and gardens are preserved in near original state with original furnishings throughout. In the garage are two large cars: one Chinese built Hongqi CA770 limousine and another Russian car presented to Soong by Joseph Stalin.
- Soong Ching-ling obtained a mansion in Beijing in 1963 where she lived and worked for the rest of her life and received many dignitaries. After her death the site was converted into the Former Residence of Soong Ching-ling as a museum and memorial. The rooms and furniture have been kept as she had used them, and memorabilia are displayed.

=== Charitable organisations ===
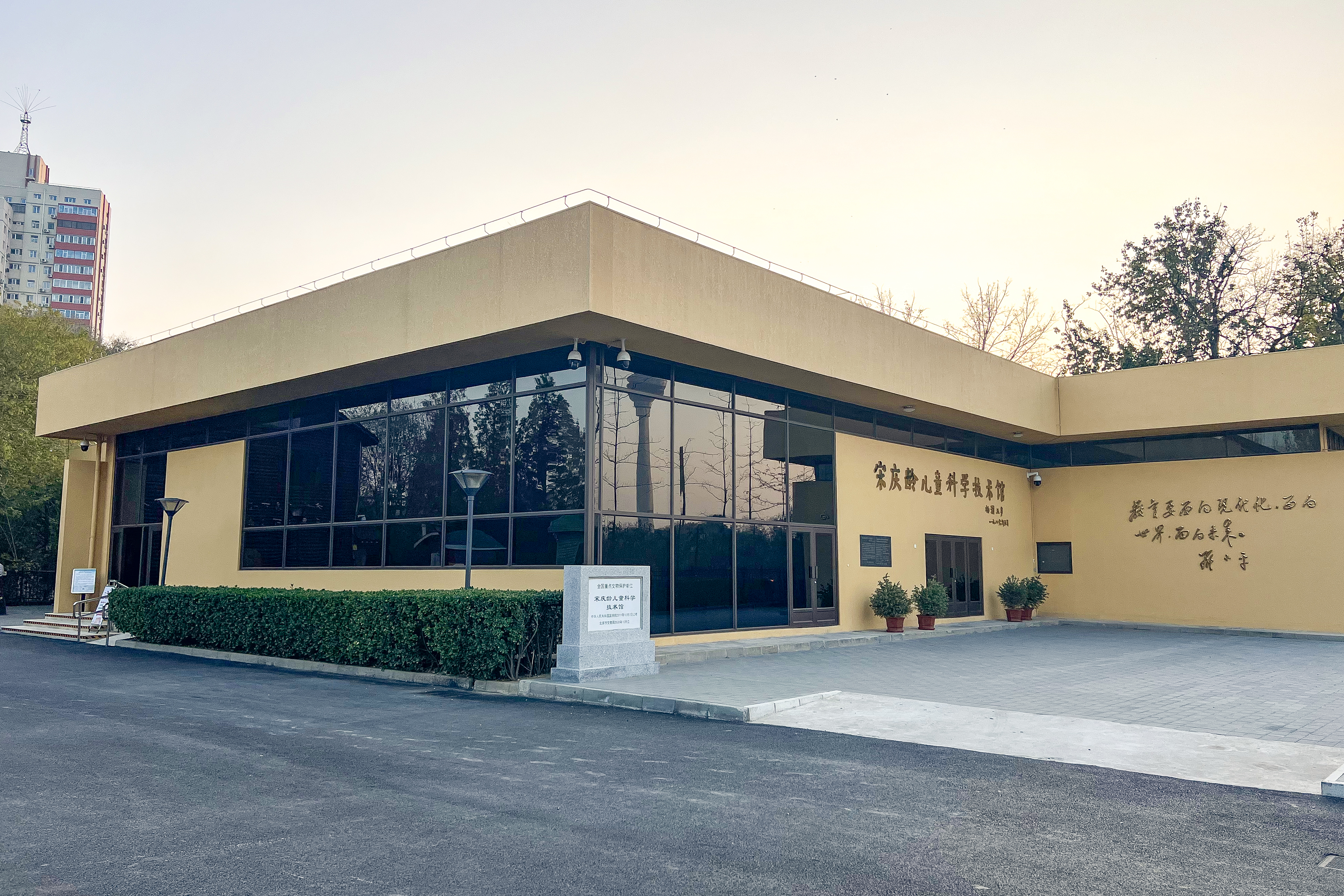
Soong Ching-Ling Science and Technology Museum for Children

In 1982, the Chinese government founded the China Soong Ching Ling Foundation, to unite charitable organisations under Soong across China. Soong's charitable foundation in Hong Kong is known as Hong Kong Rosamond Foundation.

In 2008, the China Welfare Institute founded Soong Ching Ling School in Shanghai.

== Awards and recognition ==
=== Honours ===
- China
  - First Class Order of Propitious Clouds (1944)
  - China War Memorial Medal (1945)
- Cambodia
  - Knight Grand Cross (1964)

=== Awards ===
- Soviet Union
  - International Stalin Prize for Strengthening Peace Among Peoples (1950)

=== Honorary titles ===
- Communist International
  - Honorary Chairman of the League Against Imperialism and Colonial Oppression (1927 in Belgium, 1929 in Germany)
- China
  - Honorary Chairman of the Revolutionary Committee of the Chinese Kuomintang (1948)
  - Honorary Chairman of the All-China Women's Federation (1949, 1953, 1957, 1975)
  - Honorary Chairman of the People's Republic of China (1981)

=== Honorary degrees ===
- United States
  - Honorary LL.D. from Wesleyan College (1943)
- Pakistan
  - Honorary LL.D. from the University of Dhaka (1956)
- Canada
  - Honorary LL.D. from the University of Victoria (1981)

== In popular culture ==
=== Films ===
Five years after her death, the Honorary President of the People's Republic of China was depicted in the film Dr. Sun Yat-sen. Soong is played by Maggie Cheung in the 1997 Hong Kong movie The Soong Sisters. Since the turn of the Millennium, she has been portrayed by various actresses in several mainland China historical drama movies.

Film
| Year | Actress | Title |
|---|---|---|
| 1986 | Zhang Yan | Dr. Sun Yat-sen |
| 1997 | Maggie Cheung | The Soong Sisters |
| 2009 | Xu Qing | The Founding of a Republic |
| 2011 | Dong Jie | The Founding of a Party |
| 2011 | Jiang Wenli | 1911 |
| 2012 | Luo Yang | Back to 1942 |
| 2015 | Joan Chen | Cairo Declaration |
| 2017 | Song Jia | The Founding of an Army |
| 2019 | Qin Lan | Mao Zedong 1949 |
| 2021 | Liu Shishi | 1921 |

=== Opera ===
Soong is a main character in Huang Ruo's 2011 Chinese-language western-style opera, Dr. Sun Yat-sen.

== Family ==
Soong sisters family tree

Charlie Soong; 1863–1918 | Ni Kwei-Tseng; 1869–1931
Soong Ai-ling | H. H. Kung | Soong Ching-ling | Sun Yat-sen | T. V. Soong | Lo-Yi Chang | Soong Mei-ling | Chiang Kai-shek | Soong Zi-liang | Soong Zi-on | 胡其瑛
Rosemond Kung | 孔令侃 | 孔令伟 | 孔令杰 | 宋琼颐 | 宋曼颐 | 宋瑞颐 | 宋伯熊 | 宋仲虎

== See also ==
- History of the Republic of China
- Revolutionary Committee of the Chinese Kuomintang
  - He Xiangning (wife of Liao Zhongkai)
- Soong sisters
  - Soong Ai-ling
  - Soong Mei-ling
- Soong Ching-ling Children's Literature Prize
- Women in Chinese government

== Notes ==
Government offices
| New office | Vice Chairperson of the Central People's Government; 1949–1954; Served alongside: Zhu De, Liu Shaoqi, Li Jishen, Zhang Lan, Gao Gang | Succeeded by Zhu De as Vice Chairman of the PRC |
| Preceded by Zhu De | Vice Chairperson of the People's Republic of China; 1959–1975; Served alongside: Dong Biwu | Vacant Title next held by Ulanhu |
| Preceded by Liu Shaoqi as Chairman of the PRC | Acting Head of State of the People's Republic of China; Co-Acting with Dong Biwu as Vice Chairpersons of the PRC; 1968–1972 | Succeeded by Dong Biwu as Acting Chairman of the PRC |
| Preceded by Zhu De as Chairman of the 4th NPCSC | Acting Head of State of the People's Republic of China; As acting Chairwoman of the Standing Committee of the 4th National People's Congress; 1976–1978 | Succeeded by Ye Jianying as Chairman of the 5th NPCSC |
Honorary titles
| New title | Honorary Chair of the All-China Women's Federation; 1949–1981; Served alongside: He Xiangning, Cai Chang, Deng Yingchao | Succeeded by Kang Keqing |
| New title | Honorary President of the People's Republic of China; 1981 | Vacant |
