= Honorary Chairman of the People's Republic of China =

Honorary title

Honorary Chairman of the People's Republic of China 中华人民共和国名誉主席
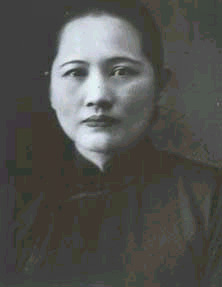
- Soong Ching ling is the only recipient of this title till date

Awarded by Standing Committee of the National People's Congress
- Type: Honorary title
- Established: 16 May 1981
- Country: China
- Status: Special
- Grantor: Standing Committee of the National People's Congress
- Decision-maker: Standing Committee of the National People's Congress

Statistics
- First induction: 16 May 1981
- Last induction: 16 May 1981
- Total inductees: 1 (Soong Ching-ling)

Precedence
- Next (higher): Highest
- Next (lower): National honorary title

The Honorary Chairman of the People's Republic of China is an honorary title conferred by the Standing Committee of the National People's Congress. Soong Ching-ling, who served as Vice Chairperson of the People's Republic of China and Vice Chairperson of the Standing Committee of the National People's Congress, is the only recipient of this title to date. On 16 May 1981, the 18th meeting of the Standing Committee of the 5th National People's Congress passed the Decision on Conferring the Honorary Title of Honorary Chairperson of the People's Republic of China on Comrade Soong Ching-ling; at this time, the position of State Chairperson had been abolished by constitutional amendment, and Soong Ching-ling was already seriously ill. On 29 May, Soong Ching-ling died at her official residence in Beijing; on the same day, the Central Committee of the Chinese Communist Party, the Standing Committee of the National People's Congress, and the State Council issued an obituary announcing that a state funeral would be held for Soong Ching-ling.

== History ==
Decision of the Standing Committee of the National People's Congress
on Conferring the Honorary Title of Honorary Chairperson of the People's Republic of China on Comrade Soong Ching-ling

Comrade Soong Ching-ling was one of the founders of the People's Republic of China, a leader deeply loved by all ethnic groups in China, including compatriots in Taiwan and overseas Chinese, and a world-renowned great fighter for patriotism, democracy, internationalism, and communism.

Comrade Soong Ching-ling, in her early years, followed the great revolutionary Dr. Sun Yat- sen and devoted herself unswervingly to the cause of Chinese national and people's liberation, and was one of the founders of the People's Republic of China. At the beginning of the founding of the PRC, she was elected Vice-Chairperson of the Central People's Government ; in 1959 and 1965, she was re-elected Vice-Chairperson of the PRC. For seventy years, she consistently stood firmly with the people of all nationalities in China in the cause of the people's democratic revolution, socialist revolution, and socialist construction. She was a leader sincerely respected by the people of all nationalities in China, including compatriots in Taiwan and overseas Chinese, and a world-renowned great fighter for patriotism, democracy, internationalism, and communism. She was widely respected by people from all walks of life, both at home and abroad, for her work in developing friendship among people of all countries, promoting progressive culture, and safeguarding world peace. Comrade Soong Ching-ling made brilliant achievements for the country and the people in the cause of China's revolution and construction. Therefore, the Standing Committee of the National People's Congress decided to confer upon Comrade Soong Ching-ling the honorary title of Honorary Chairperson of the People's Republic of China.

— Adopted at the 18th Meeting of the Standing Committee of the 5th National People's Congress on 16 May 1981
