= Working Committee on Party and State Merit and Honor Commendation =

Body of the Central Committee of the Chinese Communist Party

- 党和国家功勋荣誉表彰工作委员会
- Emblem of the Chinese Communist Party

Agency overview
- Formed: April 2016
- Type: Policy coordination and consultation body
- Jurisdiction: Chinese Communist Party
- Headquarters: Beijing
- Agency executive: Cai Qi, Director
- Parent agency: Central Committee of the Chinese Communist Party
- Child agency: Office

Working Committee on Party and State Merit and Honor Commendation
- Simplified Chinese: 党和国家功勋荣誉表彰工作委员会
Transcriptions
Standard Mandarin
- Hanyu Pinyin: Dǎng hé Guójiā Gōngxūn Róngyù Biǎozhāng Gōngzuò Wěiyuánhuì

The Working Committee on Party and State Merit and Honor Commendation is an agency of the Central Committee of the Chinese Communist Party responsible for coordinating the work of Party and state merit and honor commendation.

== History ==
In April 2016, the CCP Central Committee established the Working Committee on Party and State Merit and Honor Commendation. In the second half of 2016, the Working Committee held several meetings to study and review the draft regulations regarding merit and honor commendation.

== Functions ==
The working committee is responsible for coordinating the work of Party and state merit and honor commendation. It is responsible for organizing the selection, awarding and ceremony of merit and honor recognition.
