= Bernard Brizay =

French historian (1941–2026)

Bernard Brizay (French pronunciation: [bɛʁnaʁ bʁizɛ]; August 1941 – 22 September 2026) was a French historian.

== Life and career ==
Bernard Brizay was born in Rouen in August 1941. He studied history and taught History of Art before he became a journalist (reporter at large). Brizay died on 22 September 2026, at the age of 85.

== Resume ==
License and Master of History (writing a thesis about « French Voyageurs in Rome in 18th and 19th Centuries)

License of French Literature and History of Art

1969: Journalist in political and economical famous French magazines (Entreprise (Enterprise), Le Nouvel Économiste (The New Economist)

1976: publishing his first book (Editions du Seuil) Le Patronat francais (The French Employers)

1977: expatriated in United States for 6 months, invited by The Eisenhower Foundation (main office in Philadelphia) to conduct a study about the American Employers. He comes back with another book (PUF Editions) Le Patronat américain.

Publishing several books about political, economical and social matters.

1979: Journalist for French TV channel TF1, in the economical series called L'enjeu (The stake)

1979: Reporter at large for famous French daily newspaper Le Figaro

2005: Retiring from his journalist career.

2010: Visiting Professor at Shenyang University (Liaoning)

Bernard Brizay visited China for the first time in August 1979. Passionate about China and the Chinese people, he returned frequently, completing 20 trips up to July 2014.

October 2000: when visiting the ruins of Yuanming Yuan palace (ancient Summer Palace in Beijing) he immediately felt he should write an historical book about this unprecedented tragedy.

== Publications ==
2003: Le Sac du palais d'Été, seconde guerre de l'Opium (Editions du Rocher) – The Looting of Summer Palace, Second Opium War - translated and published in China in 2005 by The classical Editions of Zhejiang (Zhejiang Gu Ji Chu Ban She) and published between the France-China Cross-Cultural Years, thanks to the Translation Fu Lei program with the help of French Ministry of Foreign Affairs. This book was rewarded in 2007 with the Wenjin Price (Bridge of Culture) granted by the National Library of China, selected among 40 books chosen by 120 million internet users. The book has been published several times, last publishing in 2011. Will be soon translated in English.

2007: Les Trois soeurs Soong. Une dynastie chinoise du XXe siècle (Editions du Rocher) – The Three Soong Sisters. A Chinese Dynasty in 20th Century.

2008: Le Roman de Pékin. (Editions du Rocher) – Beijing Novel.

2010: Shanghai, le Paris de l'Orient. (Editions Flammarion-Pygmalion). Rewarded with French Auguste Pavie Price, granted by the French Academy of Sciences of Overseas Territories. The book is also translated in Chinese.

2013: La France en Chine, du XVIIe siècle à nos jours (Editions Perrin), will be translated in Chinese at the occasion of the 50th anniversary of acknowledgment of People's Republic of China, under Mao Zedong leadership by general de Gaulle in 1964. The book will be presented at the Shanghai Book Fair in August 2014.

== Notes and references ==
In French

- Commémoration marquant le 150ème anniversaire du pillage du Parc de Yuanminyuan, Radio Chine Internationale
- Blog Changement de Société
- Octobre 1860 : Le sac du Palais d’Eté de Pékin
- Un historien français appelle au devoir de mémoire à l’occasion du 150e anniversaire du sac de l’ancien Palais d’Eté, Agence de presse Xinhua, 19/10/2010
- Pillage du Palais d’été de Pékin : l’impossible restitution, AFP, 22/10/2010
- Les Chinois peinent à récupérer les trésors pillés du Palais d’été de Pékin en octobre 1860, Le Monde, 30/10/2010

== See also ==
- First Opium War
- Second Opium War
- Summer Palace
