= History of China–United States relations =

The history of China–United States relations during the Qing and Republican eras saw many changes. Harold Isaacs in 1955 identified six stages of American attitudes toward China. They were "respect" (18th century), "contempt" (1840–1905), "benevolence" (1905 to 1937), "admiration" (1937–1944); "disenchantment" (1944–1949), and "hostility" (after 1949). The historian Jonathan Spence updated Isaac's model to include "reawakened curiosity" (1970–1974); "guileless fascination" (1974–1979), and "renewed skepticism" (1980s).

The newly independent nation eagerly took part in the immmensely profitable Old China Trade. The country did not take military action during the Opium Wars (1839-1842) but signed the 1845 Treaty of Wangxia which provided for most favored nation benefits. American businesses anticipated a vast market and missionaries a field for evangelization, while Chinese began to emigrate to the United States. The 1871 Burlingame Treaty provided for equal relations and legal immigration, but the 1882 Chinese Exclusion Act led to a closing down of legal immigration. In 1900, Washington joined the European powers and Japan in sending troops to suppress the anti-foreign Boxer Rebellion.

The Open Door Policy of 1900 advocated equal trade opportunities and opposed any country taking territorial control. The early years of the century were a period of optimism. Missionaries grew in influence on both sides of the Pacific but efforts during the Taft presidency to secure US investment in Chinese railways were unsuccessful and after 1911 the Republic of China struggled to resist Japanese financial and military expansion. President Woodrow Wilson signed the 1919 Treaty of Versailles which ceded territory to Japan. In 1937 Nationalist and Communist parties temporarily united to fight the Second Sino-Japanese War. President Franklin D. Roosevelt called for support, but the United States did not join the war until 1941. Following Japan's surrender in 1945, the two parties resumed the Chinese Civil War, and US diplomatic efforts to mediate ultimately failed. The Communist forces prevailed, leading to the establishment of the People's Republic of China (PRC) in 1949. Critics of the United States government called this "The Loss of China". The Nationalist government retreated to Taiwan.

== The Qing Dynasty and the United States ==
Qing Empire–United States relations
- China: United States

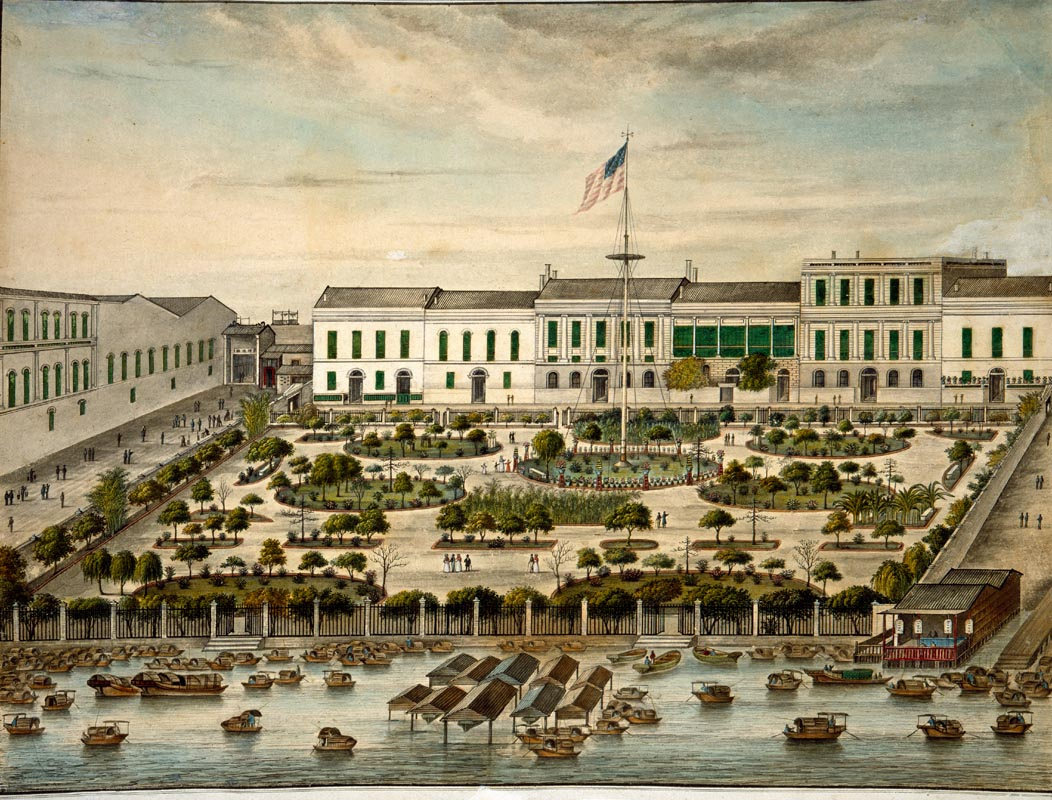
The American Garden at the Thirteen Factories in Canton, 1844–45

According to John Pomfret:

To America's founders, China was a source of inspiration. They saw it as a harmonious society with officials chosen on merit, where the arts and philosophy flourished, and the peasantry labored happily on the land. Benjamin Franklin venerated China's prison system and sought information on its senses, silk industry, and how its people heated their homes.... Thomas Paine compared Confucius to Jesus Christ. James Madison and Thomas Jefferson admired China's ability to close itself off from the outside world, finding virtue in its isolation. The Americans who actually went to China, by contrast, were befuddled and awed by the empire....Amasa Delano described China with the wonder of a country hayseed, contending that it, "is the first for greatness, riches and grandeur of any country ever known." Still, he too was distressed when he saw what appeared to be the corpses of mixed-blood babies floating down the Pearl River.

The newly independent United States dispatched consuls to Guangzhou as early as 1784—the first was Samuel Shaw. However they were not formally received by Chinese officials as state representatives. The negotiations and treaty of 1844 marked the first recognition under international law, as the countries negotiated the Treaty of Wangxia.

=== Old China Trade ===
The first United States vessel that traded in China was the Empress of China in 1784. In the following decades, trade grew in silver and gold coins, ginseng, and furs, and more prominently tea, cotton, silk, lacquerware, porcelain, and exotic furniture were traded, and Americans joined the trade in opium. The American merchants, mostly based in the East India Marine Society in Salem, Massachusetts, became wealthy, giving rise to America's first generation of millionaires. Chinese artisans began to notice the American desire for exotic wares and adjusted their practices accordingly, manufacturing goods made specifically for export. These export wares often sported American or European motifs in order to fully capitalize on the consumer demographic.

=== Missionaries ===
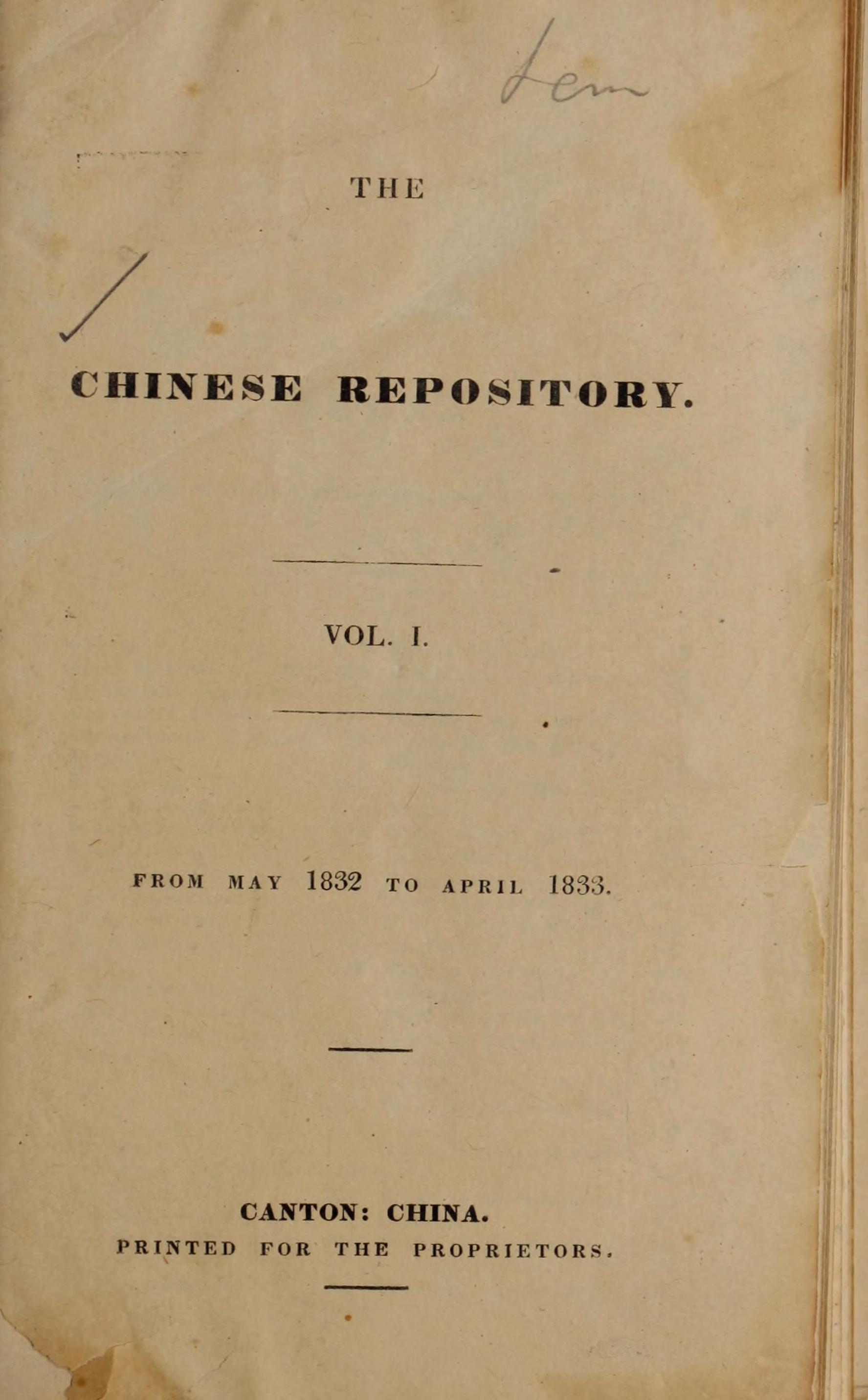
The Chinese Repository

The first American missionary in China was Elijah Coleman Bridgman (1801–61), who arrived in 1830. He soon transcended his prejudices against Chinese "idolatry," learned the Chinese language, and wrote a widely used history of the United States in Chinese. He founded the English-language journal The Chinese Repository in 1832, and it served as a major source of information on Chinese culture and politics.

American missionaries, along with Western-educated Chinese, brought Western science, sports, industry, and law. They established China's first universities and hospitals. Many, though renamed, remained important even after the 1949 revolution.

Missionaries used physical education and sports to promote healthy life styles, to overturn class conventions by showing how the poor could excel, and by expanding gender roles using women's sports. Women missionaries organized moral crusades against female infanticide and foot-binding, helping what Pomfret calls "the greatest human rights advances in modern Chinese history."

During the Boxer Rebellion of 1899–1901, Christian missions were burned, thousands of Christians were executed, and American missionaries killed. In the early years of the century, however, missions burgeoned. Paul Varg summarized American missionary work in the following period:

The growth of the missionary movement ... wove a tie between the American church-going public and China that did not exist between the United States and any other country. The number of missionaries increased from 513 in 1890 to more than 2,000 in 1914, and by 1920 there were 8,325 Protestant missionaries in China. In 1927 there were sixteen American universities and colleges, ten professional schools of collegiate rank, four schools of theology, and six schools of medicine. These institutions represented an investment of $19 million. By 1920, 265 Christian middle schools existed with an enrollment of 15,213. There were thousands of elementary schools; the Presbyterians alone had 383 primary schools with about 15,000 students.

Catholics in America also supported large mission operations in China.

President Woodrow Wilson was in touch with his former Princeton students who were missionaries in China, and he strongly endorsed their work. In 1916 he told a delegation of ministers:

This is the most amazing and inspiring vision –- this vision of that great sleeping nation suddenly awakened by the voice of Christ. Could there be any greater contribution to the future momentum of the moral forces of the world than could be made by quickening the force, which is being set of foot in China? China is at present inchoate; as a nation it is a congeries of parts, in each of which there is energy, but which are unbound in any essential and active unit, and just as soon as unity comes, its power will come in the world.

=== Caleb Cushing ===
After the British victory in the First Opium War in 1842, the resulting Treaty of Nanking opened Shanghai and four other Chinese "treaty ports" to British trade. President John Tyler In 1843 appointed Massachusetts diplomat Caleb Cushing as commissioner and minister. With the goal of impressing the Imperial Chinese court and gaining access to the five ports, the Cushing mission suddenly appeared with four Navy warships, loaded with gifts that exalted scientific wonders including revolvers, telescopes, and an encyclopedia. His arrival at Macau in February 1844 created a local sensation, but the Chinese government was reluctant to designate another most favored nation. Cushing cleverly mixed the carrot and stick. He warned – against the backdrop of his warships – that not to receive an envoy was a national insult. He threatened to go directly to the Emperor – an unheard of procedure. The Emperor tried delay, but he finally sent an envoy to negotiate with Cushing, leading to the signing of the Treaty of Wanghia on 3 July 1844. In addition to most favored nation status, Cushing made sure that Americans received extraterritoriality, which meant that legal cases involving Americans inside China would be tried by Western judges, not by Chinese judges. In the following years American trade with China grew rapidly, thanks to the high-speed clipper ships which carried relatively small amounts of high-value cargo, such as ginseng and silk. American Protestant missionaries also began to arrive. The popular Chinese reaction was mostly hostile, but there was a favorable element that provided a base of support for American missionaries and businessmen. Foreign trade and popular Chinese opinion of outsiders in general, suffered during the Taiping Rebellion; which lasted from 1850 to 1864, cost millions of Chinese deaths and led to a stagnation in foreign trade.

During the Second Opium War, American and Qing forces briefly clashed in November 1856 at the Battle of the Barrier Forts, the first instance of military engagement between the two. After China's defeat in the Second Opium War, the Xianfeng Emperor fled Beijing. His brother Yixin, the Prince Gong, ratified the Treaty of Tientsin in the Convention of Peking on 18 October 1860. This treaty stipulated, among other terms, that along with Britain, France, and Russia, the United States would have the right to station legation offices in Beijing.

=== Formosa ===
Some Americans suggested the annexation of Taiwan from Qing China, but that idea won no support in Washington. Local aboriginals sometimes massacred shipwrecked Western sailors. In 1867, during the Rover incident, Taiwanese aborigines attacked shipwrecked American sailors, killing the entire crew. They subsequently defeated a retaliatory expedition by the American military and killed another American during the skirmish.

=== The Burlingame Treaty and the Chinese Exclusion Act ===
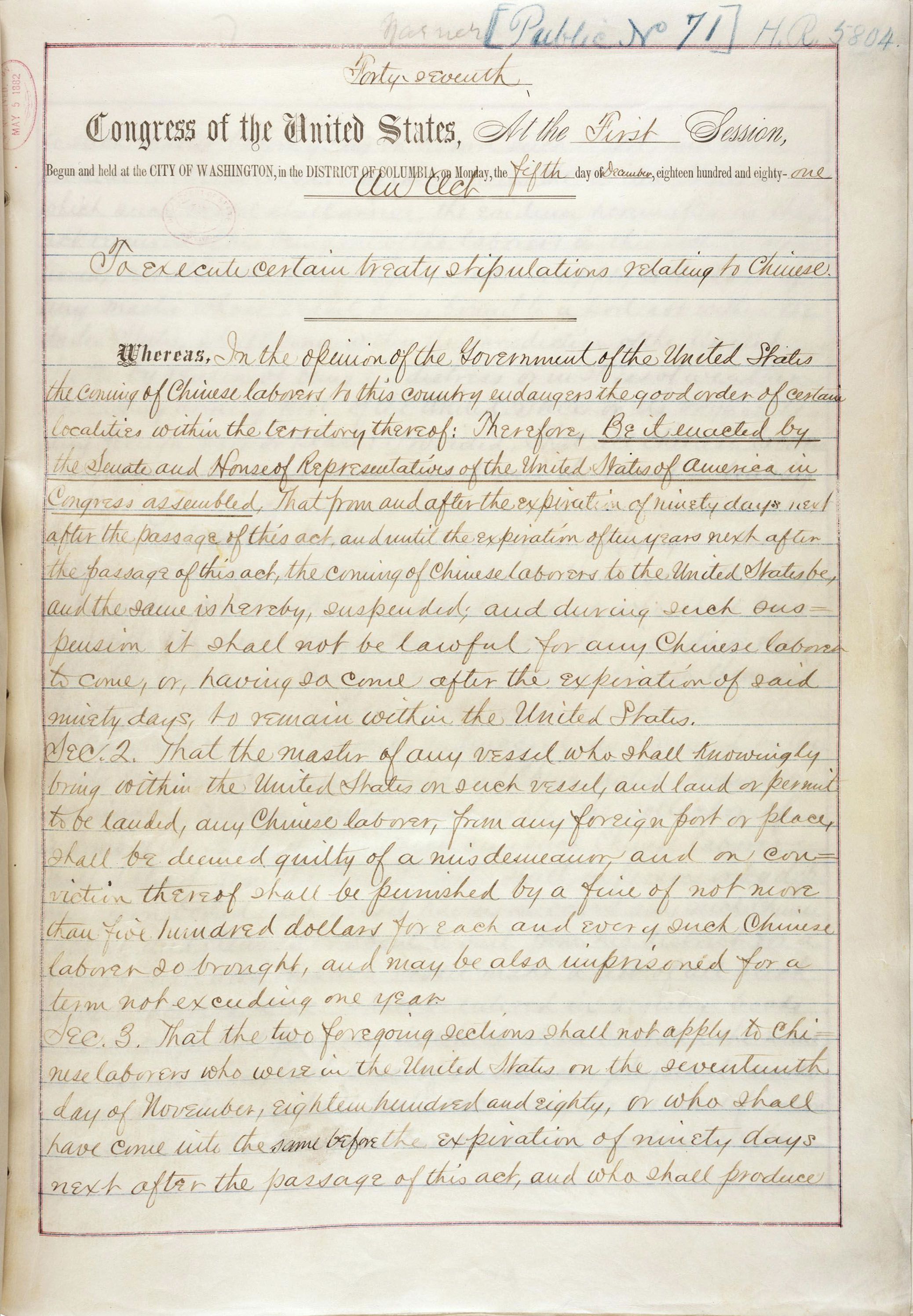
The first page of the Chinese Exclusion Act of 1882

In 1868, the Qing government appointed an American Anson Burlingame as their emissary to the United States. Burlingame toured the U.S. building support for equitable treatment for China and for Chinese emigrants. The 1868 Burlingame Treaty embodied these principles. It was the first equal treaty signed between China and the United State. In 1871, the Chinese Educational Mission brought the first of two groups of 120 Chinese boys to study in the United States. They were led by Yung Wing, the first Chinese student to graduate from an American college.

In the 1850s and 1860s the California Gold Rush and the construction of the transcontinental railroad, large numbers of Chinese emigrated to the U.S., spurring animosity from American citizens. After being forcibly driven from the mines, most Chinese created Chinatowns in a few cities such as San Francisco. They specialized in laundry and cleaning work. Anti-Chinese animosity became politicized by Irish American labor leader Denis Kearney and his party, as well as by the California governor John Bigler. They warned Chinese coolies would depress wage levels. In the first significant restriction on free immigration in U.S. history, Congress passed the Chinese Exclusion Act on 6 May 1882, following revisions made in 1880 to the Burlingame Treaty. Those treaty revisions allowed the Congress to suspend immigration, and Congress acted quickly to exclude Chinese skilled and unskilled laborers from entering the country for ten years, under penalty of imprisonment and deportation. The ban was renewed a number of times, lasting for over 60 years.

=== Searching for the China market ===
The American China Development Company, founded in 1895 by industrialists J.P. Morgan and Andrew Carnegie, sought to provide the American capital and management that would generate a rapid industrialization of China. It started building the Hankow-Canton Railroad, to link central and southern China. It only managed to finish 30 miles of line. Americans soon grew disillusioned, and sold out to a rival Belgian syndicate. On the whole, the American dream of getting rich by investing in China or selling to hundreds of millions of Chinese was almost always a failure. Standard Oil did succeed in selling kerosene for lamps to the China market, but few others made a profit.

=== The Boxer Rebellion ===
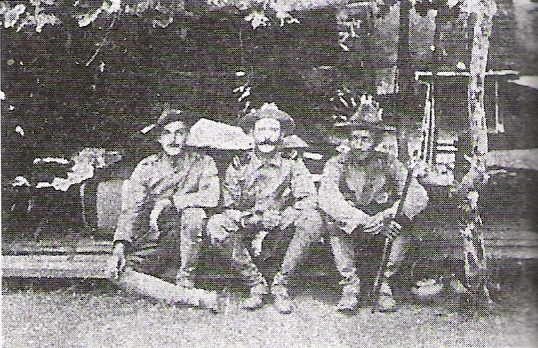
US troops in China during the Boxer Rebellion in 1900

In 1899, a movement of Chinese nationalists calling themselves the Society of Right and Harmonious Fists started a violent revolt in northern China, referred to by Westerners as the Boxer Rebellion, against foreign influence in trade, politics, religion, and technology. The campaigns took place from November 1899 to 7 September 1901, during the final years of Manchu rule in China under the Qing dynasty.

The uprising began as an anti-foreign, anti-imperialist, peasant-based movement in northern China, in response to foreign westerners seizing land from locals, concession grabbing, and granting immunity to criminals who converted to Catholicism. The insurgents attacked foreigners, who were building railroads and violating Feng shui, and Christians, who were held responsible for the foreign domination of China. In June 1900, the Boxers entered Beijing, and ransacked the area around the Foreign Legations. On 21 June, in response to the Western attack on the Chinese Dagu Forts, Empress Dowager Cixi declared war against all Western powers. Diplomats, foreign civilians, soldiers, and Chinese Christians were besieged during the Siege of the International Legations for 55 days. A coalition called the Eight-Nation Alliance comprising Austria-Hungary, France, Germany, Italy, Japan, Russia, Britain and the United States organized the Seymour Expedition with 2000 troops, including 116 Americans. They were repulsed by the Boxers at the Battle of Langfang. A much larger Allied force formed the Gaselee Expedition and it was successful due to internal rivalries among the Chinese forces.

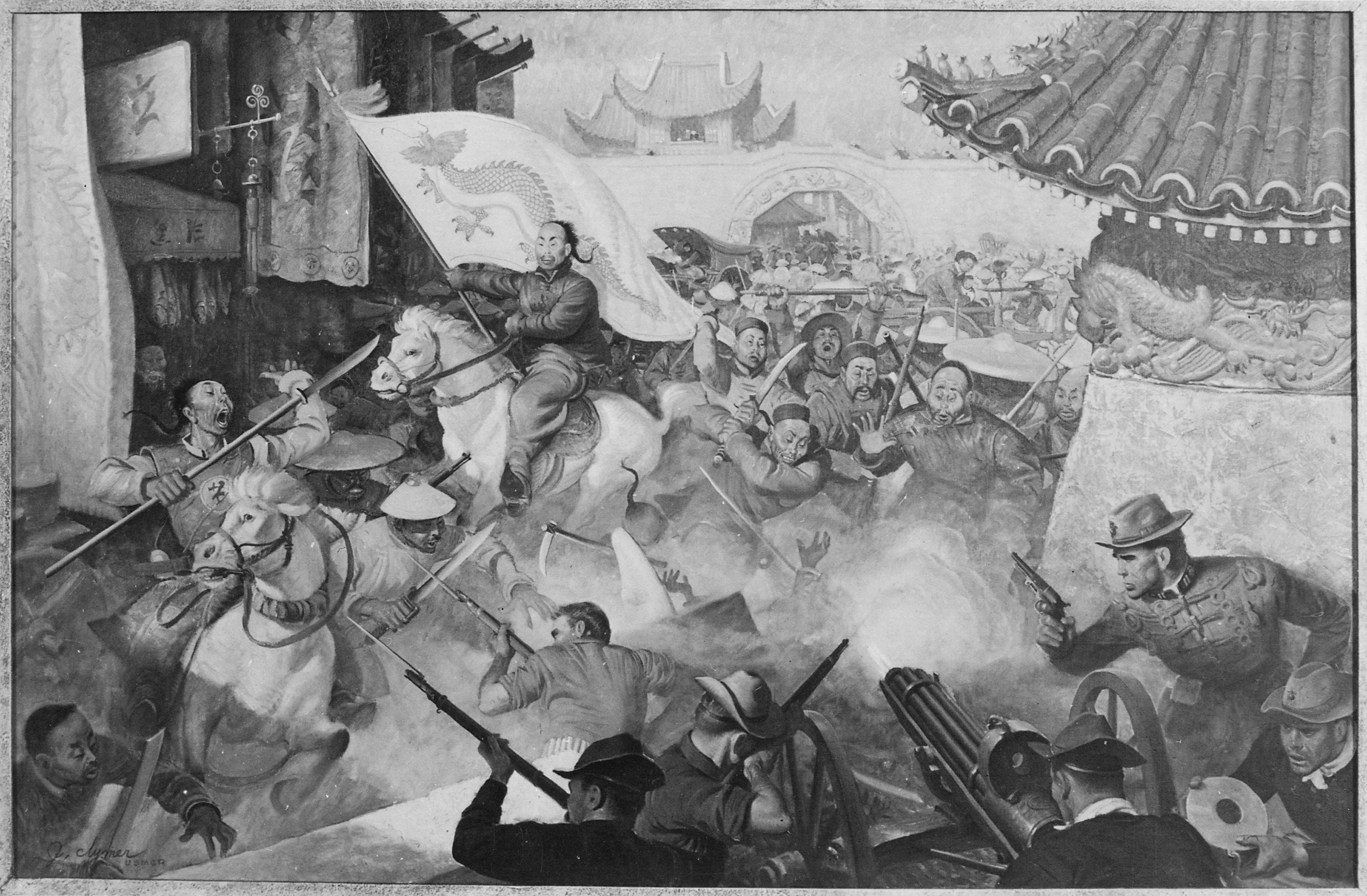
U.S. Marines fight rebellious Boxers outside Beijing Legation Quarter, 1900. Copy of painting by Sergeant John Clymer.

The United States played a secondary but significant role in suppressing the Boxer Rebellion, largely due to the availability of warships stationed in the Philippines. In 1900-1901 American forces were included in the Allied occupation of Beijing. The American commander, Colonel Adna Chaffee, began public health, relief, and police operations in cooperation with Chinese officials. Chaffee concluded that Asiatics respected only the superior power. Reassigned to the Philippines he applied the lessons there, combining benevolence and public health measures with force and cooperation with local officials.

The foreign powers required China to pay them indemnities through the Boxer Protocol. In 1908, U.S. President Theodore Roosevelt appropriated the United States's Boxer indemnity funds to pay for educational exchanges with China, including scholarship funds which resulted in tends of thousands of Chinese students studying in the United States over the next 40 years. The use of Boxer Indemnity funds also funded a number of schools were established in China, such as Tsinghua College in Beijing.

With national attention focused on the Boxers, American Protestants made missions to China a high priority. They supported 500 missionaries in 1890, more than 2000 in 1914, and 8300 in 1920. By 1927 they opened 16 American universities, six medical schools, and four theology schools, together with 265 middle schools and a large number of elementary schools. The number of converts was not large, but the educational influence was dramatic.

=== Open Door Policy ===
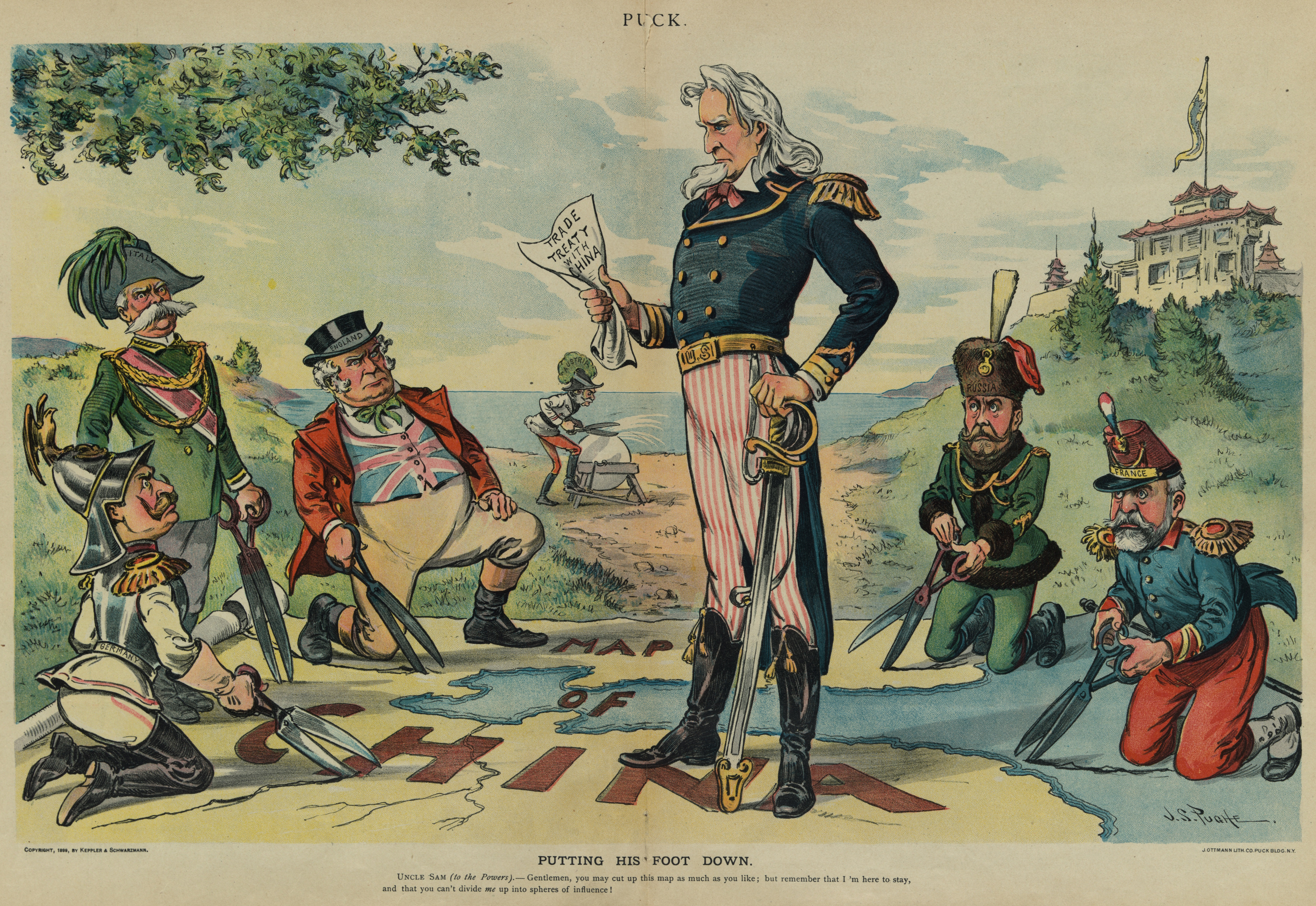
"Putting his foot down" Uncle Sam in 1899 demands Open Door while major powers plan to cut up China for themselves; Germany, Italy, Britain, Austria, Russia & France are represented by Wilhelm II, Umberto I, John Bull, Franz Joseph I (in rear) Uncle Sam, Nicholas II, and Emile Loubet. Punch 23 August 1899 by J. S. Pughe

In the 1890s the major world powers (France, Britain, Germany, Japan, and Russia) began proposing spheres of influence for themselves in China, which was then under the Qing dynasty. The United States demanded these proposals to be discarded so that all nations could trade on an equal footing. In 1899, U.S. Secretary of State John Hay sent diplomatic letters to these nations, asking them to guarantee the territorial and administrative integrity of China and to not interfere with the free use of treaty ports within their theoretical spheres of influence. The major powers evaded commitment, saying they could not agree to anything until the other powers had consented first. Hay took this as acceptance of his proposal, which came to be known as the Open Door Policy.

Grand Council Yuan Shikai travel to Hawaii discussing a potential alliance with the German Empire and the United States of America.

While respected internationally, the Open Door Policy was ignored by Russia and Japan when they encroached in Manchuria. The U.S. protested Russia's actions. Japan and Russia fought the Russo-Japanese War in 1904, in which the U.S. mediated a peace.

=== Other exchanges ===
In 1872, the Qing dynasty sent 120 students to the United States as China's first Educational Mission.

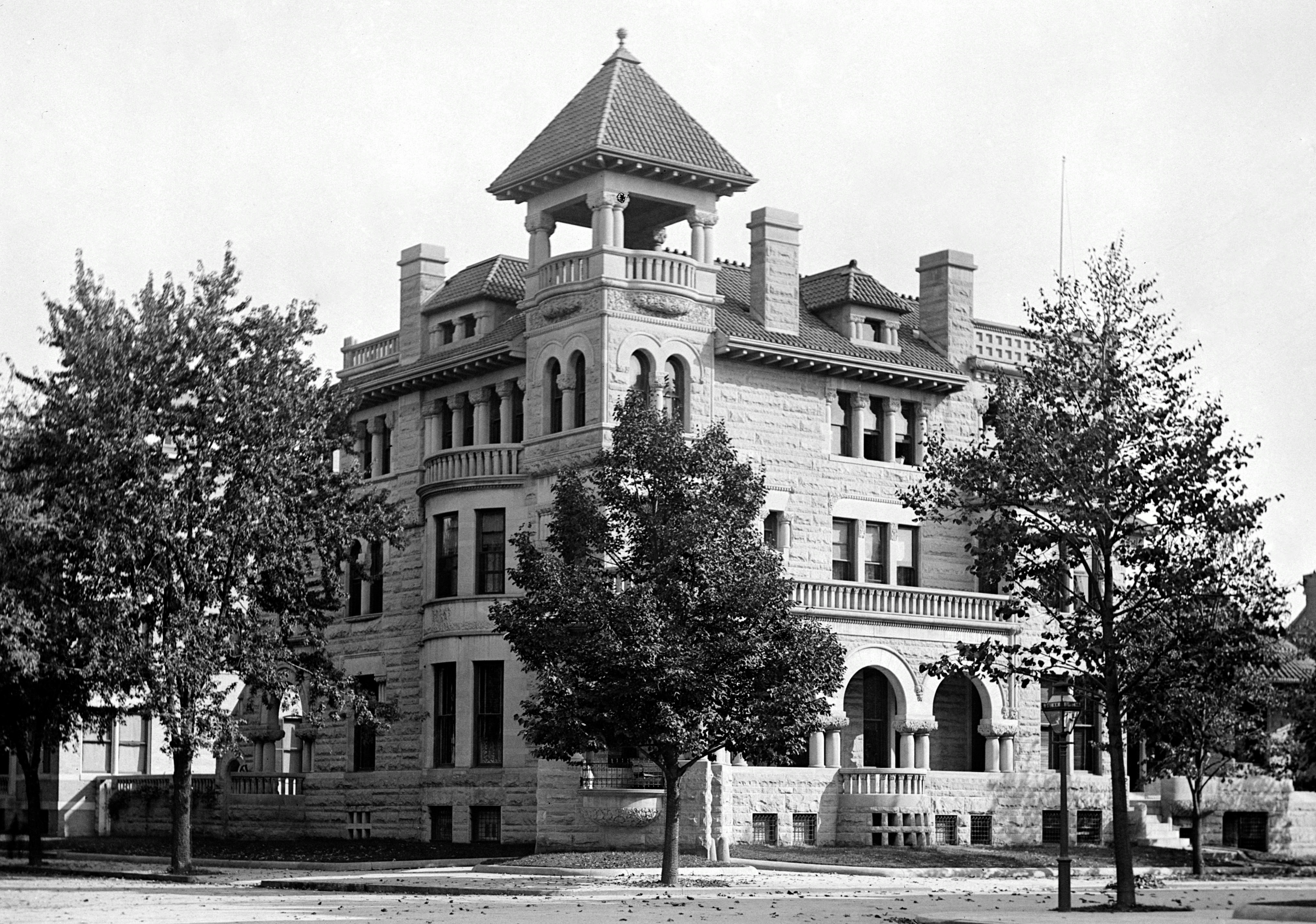
Washington DC residence of China's envoy Wu Tingfang

== The Republic of China and the United States ==
China–United States relations
- China: United States

=== 1911–1937 ===
After the 1911 Revolution, Washington recognized the new Government of the Chinese Republic as the sole and legitimate government of China. In practice a number of powerful regional warlords were in control and the central government handled foreign policy and little else. The Twenty-One Demands were a set of secret demands made in 1915 by the Empire of Japan to Yuan Shikai the general who served as president of the Republic of China. The demands would greatly extend Japanese control. Japan would keep the former German concessions it had conquered at the start of World War I in 1914. Japan would be stronger in Manchuria and South Mongolia. It would have an expanded role in railways. The most extreme demands (in section 5) would give Japan a decisive voice in China's finance, policing, and government affairs. Indeed, fifth section would make China in effect a protectorate of Japan, and thereby reduce Western influence. Japan was in a strong position, as the Western powers were in a stalemated war with Germany. Britain and Japan had a military alliance since 1902, and in 1914 London had asked Tokyo to enter the war. Beijing published the secret demands and appealed to Washington and London. They were sympathetic and pressured Tokyo. In the final 1916 settlement, Japan gave up its fifth set of demands. It gained a little in China, but lost a great deal of prestige and trust in the U.S. and Britain. The U.S. State Department argued in January 1915:

Our present commercial interests in Japan are greater than those in China, but the look ahead shows our interest to be a strong and independent China rather than one held in subjection by Japan. China has certain claims upon our sympathy. If we do not recognize them, as we refuse to recognize Korea's claim, we are in danger of losing our influence in the Far East and of adding to the dangers of the situation.

The Empire of Japan also made secret treaties with the Allied Powers promising Japan the German territories in China.

In January 1918, U.S. President Woodrow Wilson delivered the Fourteen Points speech which proposed self-determination and ending secret diplomacy among the powerful countries. This was received positively in China, which sought the return of the German holdings in Shandong, which Japan had seized early in World War I. At the Paris Peace Conference, Wilson dismissed a proposal for a racial equality provision in the treaty and agreed that Japan should keep Shandong. This led to outrage in China, where it was deemed the "betrayal at Versailles" and damaged the image of the Western countries. The result of the conference led many in Chinese elite circles to doubt the value of Western world views and whether such views could be adopted in China. It contributed to the intense nationalism characterized by the May Fourth Movement, and the tendency of intellectuals and activists in the 1920s to look to Moscow for leadership.

The U.S.'s Minister to China, Paul Samuel Reinsch, resigned in protest over what he viewed as an unjust result in Japan retaining Germany's Shandong possessions.

Bruce Elleman contends that Wilson did not betray China at the Paris Peace Conference. He writes that Wilson's action was in accord with widely recognized treaties which China had signed with Japan during the war. Wilson tried to get Japan to promise to return the concessions in 1922, but the Chinese delegation rejected that compromise.

In 1922 the Nine-Power Treaty signed by Washington, Beijing, Tokyo and London, and others, contained explicit protections for China.

Frank Kellogg was the Secretary of State (1925–1929) and he followed the advice of Nelson Johnson, the new chief of the Division of Far Eastern Affairs. They favored China and protected it from threats from Japan. The key to Chinese sovereignty in foreign policy was to gain control of tariff rates, which Western powers had set at a low 5%, and to end the extra territoriality by which Britain and the others controlled Shanghai and other treaty ports. Kellogg and Johnson successfully negotiated tariff reform with China, thereby giving enhanced status to the Kuomintang and helping get rid of the unequal treaties. China was reunified by a single government, led by the Kuomintang (KMT) in 1928. With American help China achieved some of its diplomatic goals in 1928–1931.

In 1931, the Empire of Japan invaded and occupied Manchuria. The United States along with other countries condemned the action, leading to U.S. support for China in its war with Japan after 1937.

==== Education ====
Starting in the 1870s, American missionaries began developing educational institutions in China. They discovered the demand for Western education was much stronger, and much more elite, than the demand for Christianity. Programs were set up to fund Chinese students In American colleges. Pearl S. Buck was an American, born in the United States but raised in China. Her best sellers and lectures generated wide American support for the Chinese peasantry. President Woodrow Wilson was in touch with his former students who were missionaries in China, and he strongly endorsed their work.

=== World War II ===
Chiang Kai-shek, Franklin D. Roosevelt, and Winston Churchill at the Cairo Conference in 1943.

In late 1935, the Communist International (Comintern) instructed the CCP to establish the broadest possible anti-fascist united front. At a meeting in December 1935, the CCP Politburo resolved to reach understanding, seek compromise, and establish relations with all nations, parties, and individuals who opposed imperial Japan.

The outbreak of the Second Sino-Japanese War in 1937 saw massive military and economic aid start to flow into the Republic of China (ROC), from the United States under President Franklin D. Roosevelt. A series of Neutrality Acts forbade American aid to countries at war. Because the Second Sino-Japanese War was undeclared, however, Roosevelt denied that a state of war existed in China and proceeded to send aid to Chiang. American public sympathy for the Chinese was aroused by reports from missionaries, novelists such as Pearl S. Buck, and Time Magazine of Japanese brutality in China, including reports surrounding the Nanjing Massacre, also known as the 'Rape of Nanjing'. Japanese-American relations were further soured by the USS Panay incident during the bombing of Nanjing, in which a Yangtze Patrol gunboat of the US Navy was accidentally sunk by Imperial Japanese Navy Air Service bombers. Roosevelt demanded an apology and compensation from the Japanese, which was received, but relations between the two countries continued to deteriorate. American public opinion overwhelmingly favored China and denounced Japan.

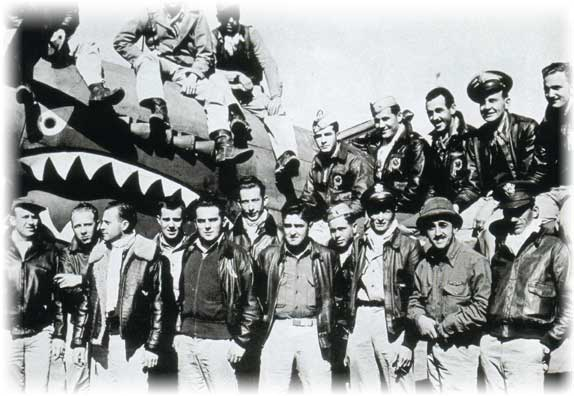
Flying Tigers, the 1st American Volunteer Group (AVG), of the Chinese Air Force

The United States strongly supported ROC starting in 1937 and warned Japan to get out. American financial and military aid began to flow. Claire Lee Chennault commanded the 1st American Volunteer Group (nicknamed Flying Tigers), with American pilots flying American warplanes painted with the Chinese flag to attack the Japanese. He headed both the volunteer group and the uniformed U.S. Army Air Forces units that replaced it in 1942. The United States cut off Japan's main oil supplies in 1941 to force it to compromise regarding China, but instead Japan attacked American, British and Dutch possessions in the western Pacific.

==== Plan to bomb Japan and declaration of war ====
In 1940, a year before Pearl Harbor, Washington developed an ambitious plan for a sneak attack on Japanese bases. The U.S. would send in American pilots and planes wearing Chinese uniforms and markings. These were the Flying Tigers. They would bomb Japan. The U.S. Army (which was in charge of the Air Corps) was opposed to this scheme and raised obstacles, noting that being able to reach Japan depended on the weak Chinese National Revolutionary Army being able to build and protect airfields and bases close enough to Japan, which they doubted he could do. The generals had little confidence in the scheme. Ignoring the Army's advice, American civilian leaders were captivated by the idea of China attacking Japan by air. Enthusiastic approval came Treasury Secretary Henry Morgenthau Jr. and President Franklin D. Roosevelt himself. (Note: The official Army history notes that 23 July 1941 FDR "approved a Joint Board paper which recommended that the United States equip, man, and maintain the 500-plane Chinese Air Force proposed by Currie. The paper suggested this force embark on a vigorous program to be climaxed by the bombing of Japan in November 1941.Lauchlin Currie was the White House official dealing with China.) However, the proposed attack never took place: The Chinese had not built and secured any runways or bases close enough to reach Japan, just as the Army had warned. The American bombers and crews were delayed and finally arrived shortly after the Japanese attack on Pearl Harbor. The bombers were used for the war in Burma against Japan, as they lacked the range to reach Japan from secure bases in China.

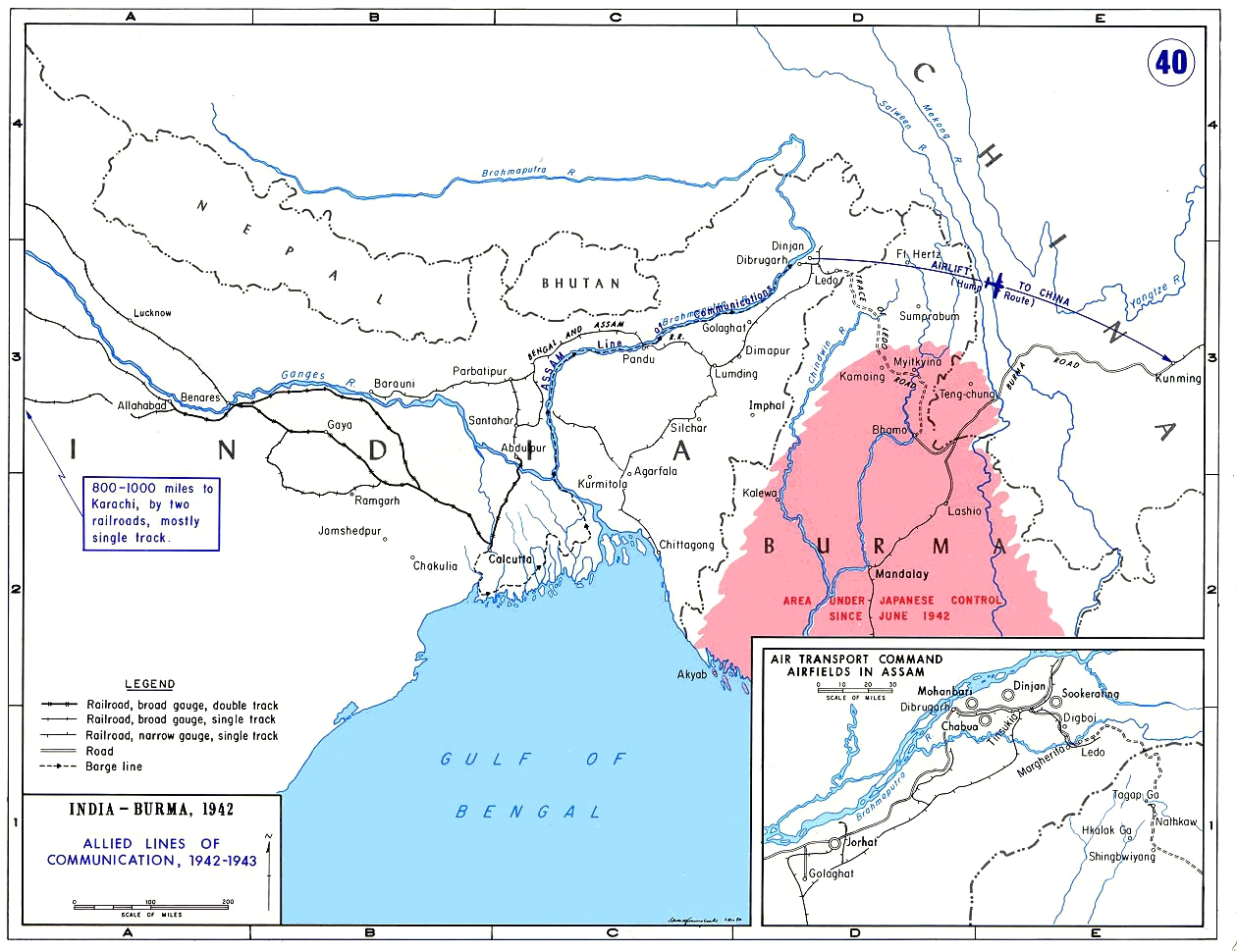
The India–China airlift delivered approximately 650,000 tons of materiel to China at a cost of 1,659 men and 594 aircraft.

The United States formally declared war on Japan in December 1941. The Roosevelt administration gave massive amounts of aid to Chiang's beleaguered government, now headquartered in Chongqing. Soong Mei-ling (widely known as "Madame Chiang Kai-shek" in the United States), the American-educated wife of ROC Generalissimo Chiang Kai-shek, addressed the US Congress and toured the country to rally support for China. Congress amended the Chinese Exclusion Act and Roosevelt moved to end the unequal treaties by establishing the Treaty for Relinquishment of Extraterritorial Rights in China.

==== Wartime tensions and communist outreach ====
Relations during World War II between the United States and the Nationalist government of Chiang Kai-shek were sometimes strained. A major cause of tension was the Nationalist government's insistence on an official exchange that greatly overvalued the nationalist currency. Additionally, Chiang's persistent requests for financial support and aggressive tactics in seeking American financial backing resulted in jokes from American officials that his name was really "Cash-My-Check." Although the United States was the economically and militarily dominant power in the bilateral relationship, Chiang was sensitive to the perception that China was being seen as a second-rate power by the West and was inclined to be particularly forceful when he viewed the United States as not treating China with appropriate dignity.

In November 1943, Roosevelt hosted a meeting with representatives of 44 countries to consider rebuilding Allied countries which had suffered during the war. This initiative became known as the United Nations Relief and Rehabilitation Administration. The United States was the primary financial backer and China the largest recipient of funds. Mistrust between the Nationalist government and the United States grew as Chiang pushed to control the disposition of funds in China to ensure that relief funds did not go to the Communist-governed areas of the country.

The perception that Chiang's government was unable to effectively resist the Japanese or that he preferred to focus more on defeating the Communists grew. China Hands such as Joseph "Vinegar Joe" Stilwell—who spoke fluent Mandarin Chinese—argued that it was in American interest to establish communication with the Communists to prepare for a land-based counteroffensive invasion of Japan. The Dixie Mission, which began in 1943, was the first official American contact with the Communists. At the same time, after the United States’ entry into World War II, the communists sought military support from the US. CCP Chairman Mao Zedong welcomed the American Military Observation Group in Yan'an and in 1944 invited the U.S. to establish a consulate there.

Other Americans, such as Claire Lee Chennault, argued for air power and supported Chiang's position. In 1944, Chennault successfully demanded that Stilwell be recalled. General Albert Coady Wedemeyer replaced Stilwell, and Patrick J. Hurley became ambassador.

=== Civil War in mainland China ===
The defeat of Japan in 1945 caused the U.S. to reevaluate their position in Asia. President Truman was worried that the collapse of the Japanese empire would cause a power vacuum which could be filled by the Soviet Union. However, the Soviet Union acted cautiously in the conflict, eventually withdrawing in May 1946, which left the U.S. feeling as though there was not a serious Soviet threat in the region.

After World War II ended in 1945, the hostility between the Nationalists and the Communists exploded into the open Chinese Civil War. During World War II, tensions between the Nationalist government and the United States had grown as American officials became suspicious with how grants and loans were being spent, and Chiang viewing efforts to restrict the use of funds as a slight to his dignity and China's dignity. This dynamic worsened during the Civil War period.

During the civil war, the communists petitioned the U.S. for support but were unsuccessful. Instead, the U.S. offered both military and financial support to the KMT, under the hopes that a united, democratic, coalition government would be formed in China.

In November 1946, China and the United States signed a new commerce treaty. The Chinese press, particularly liberal newspapers and leftist newspapers, viewed the treaty skeptically. Nationalist China's Legislative Yuan was concerned that the treaty would result in American firms dominating the Chinese markets. American business interests were also generally dissatisfied with the treaty, which they viewed as violating the Open Door policy.

President Truman dispatched General George Marshall to China to mediate the Civil War, but the Marshall Mission was not successful. In February 1948, Marshall, now Secretary of State, testified to Congress in secret session that he had realized from the start that the Nationalists could never defeat the Communists in the field, so some sort of negotiated settlement was necessary or else the United States would have to fight the war. He warned:

Any large-scale United States effort to assist the Chinese Government to oppose the Communists would most probably degenerate into a direct U.S. undertaking and responsibility, involving the commitment of sizable forces and resources over an indefinite period. Such a dissipation of U.S. resources would inevitably play into the hands of the Russians, or would provoke a reaction which would possibly, even probably, lead to another Spanish type of revolution or general hostilities....the cost of an all-out effort to see Communist forces resisted and destroyed in China...would clearly be out of all proportion to the results to be obtained.

On 5 August 1949, the Truman administration released a white paper on relations with China. Responding to domestic arguments about responsibility for the perceived loss of China to communism, Secretary of State Dean Acheson placed blame on Chiang Kai-shek's Nationalist government for losing the confidence of its military and the Chinese people and stated that the United States could not have prevented the outcome of the Chinese Civil War. This position failed to satisfy domestic critics. It also harmed the prospect of diplomacy with the communists and outraged Mao Zedong, who wrote a series of articles criticizing the white paper. Mao criticized the Truman administration for providing huge amounts of support to Nationalist forces which the administration deemed demoralized and unpopular, stating that the only rational basis must have therefore been the Truman administration's imperialist ambitions and desire to hurt the Chinese people by needlessly prolonging the civil war.

Amidst successive PRC victories, the U.S. ambassador to China John Leighton Stewart left China in August 1949. CCP Chairman Mao Zedong penned an article directly addressing the ambassador, entitled "Farewell, Leighton Stewart!", writing that his departure represented "the complete defeat of the U.S. policy of aggression" and was "worth celebrating".

When it became clear that the KMT would lose effective control of China in 1949, Secretary of State Dean Acheson directed the publication of the China White Paper to explain American policy and defend against critics (e.g., the American China Policy Association) who asked "Who Lost China?" He announced that the United States would "wait for the dust to settle" before recognizing the new government. Chinese Military forces under Chiang Kai-shek had gone to the island of Taiwan to accept the surrender of Japanese troops, thus beginning the military occupation of Taiwan, and withdrew to the island from 1948 to 1949. Chinese Communist Party (CCP) Chairman Mao Zedong established the People's Republic of China on mainland China, while Taiwan and other islands are still under the control of the Republic of China.

== Modern relations ==
The People's Republic of China was founded after the communist People's Liberation Army (PLA) won the Chinese Civil War against the Kuomintang nationalists (KMT) and officially established on 1 October 1949. The defeated KMT fled to Taiwan, which they occupied under martial law until 1987, while the PLA secured control of mainland China. Following the civil war, America only recognized the KMT-controlled Republic of China in Taiwan as a legitimate government, not the communist People's Republic of China.

== See also ==
- Taiwan–United States relations
- Stilwell and the American Experience in China, 1911–45, book by Barbara W. Tuchman
- East Asia–United States relations
- Foreign relations of the Republic of China
- Economic history of China (1912–1949)
- History of China
  - History of the Republic of China
