= Marshall Mission =

1945-47 failed American diplomatic mission to China

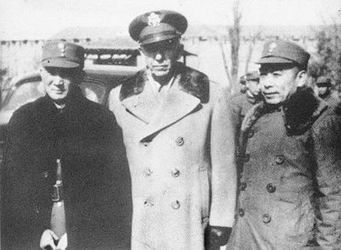
General Marshall with General Zhang Zhizhong and Zhou Enlai in 1946.

The Marshall Mission (Chinese: 馬歇爾使華; pinyin: Mǎxiē'ěr Shǐhuá; 20 December 1945 – January 1947) was a failed diplomatic mission undertaken by US Army General George C. Marshall to China in an attempt to negotiate between the Chinese Communist Party and the Nationalists (Kuomintang) to create a unified Chinese government.

== Historical background ==
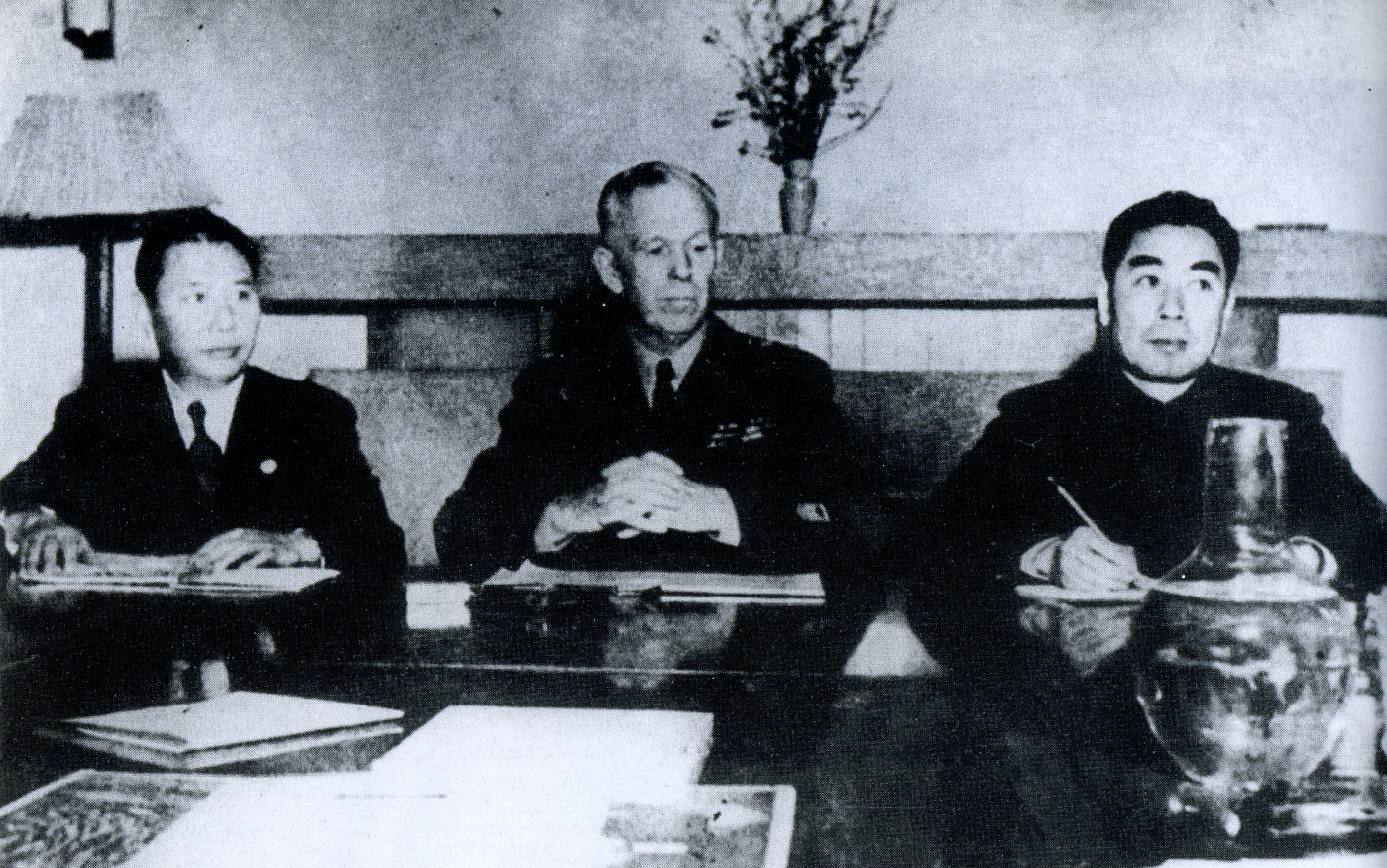
Committee of Three, from left, Nationalist representative Zhang Qun, George C. Marshall and Communist representative Zhou Enlai. 1946.

Throughout the Second Sino-Japanese War, an uneasy stalemate had existed between the Chinese Communists (CCP) and the Chinese Nationalists (KMT), but prior to the war, both parties had been in open conflict with each other. Numerous US military personnel and private writers visited and reported on the Chinese Communist Party. In 1936, the international journalist Edgar Snow traveled and interviewed leading members of the Chinese Communist Party. Snow reported that Mao was a reformer, rather than a radical revolutionary, and many readers got the impression that the Chinese communists were "agrarian reformers." In the 1944 Dixie Mission, US Colonel John Service visited the Communists and praised them. He claimed that they were democratic reformers, likened them to European socialists, rather than Soviet Communists; and claimed that they were less corrupt and chaotic than the Nationalists.

US Ambassador to China Clarence Gauss recommended for the United States to "pull up the plug and let the whole Chinese Government go down the drain." General Patrick Hurley claimed that the Chinese Communists were not real communists. China Burma India Theater Commander Joseph Stilwell repeatedly claimed (in contradiction to Comintern statistics) that Communists were doing more than the Nationalists, and he sought to cut off all US aid to China.

American attempts during the Second World War to end the intermittent Chinese Civil War between the two factions had failed, notably the Hurley Mission. In 1944 General Patrick Hurley approached both groups and believed that their differences were comparable to the Republicans and Democrats in the United States.

Throughout the war, both the Communists and the Nationalists had accused the other of withholding men and arms against the Japanese in preparation for offensive actions against the other. Thus, in a desperate attempt to keep the country whole, US President Harry S Truman in late 1945 sent General George C. Marshall as his special presidential envoy to China to negotiate a unity government.

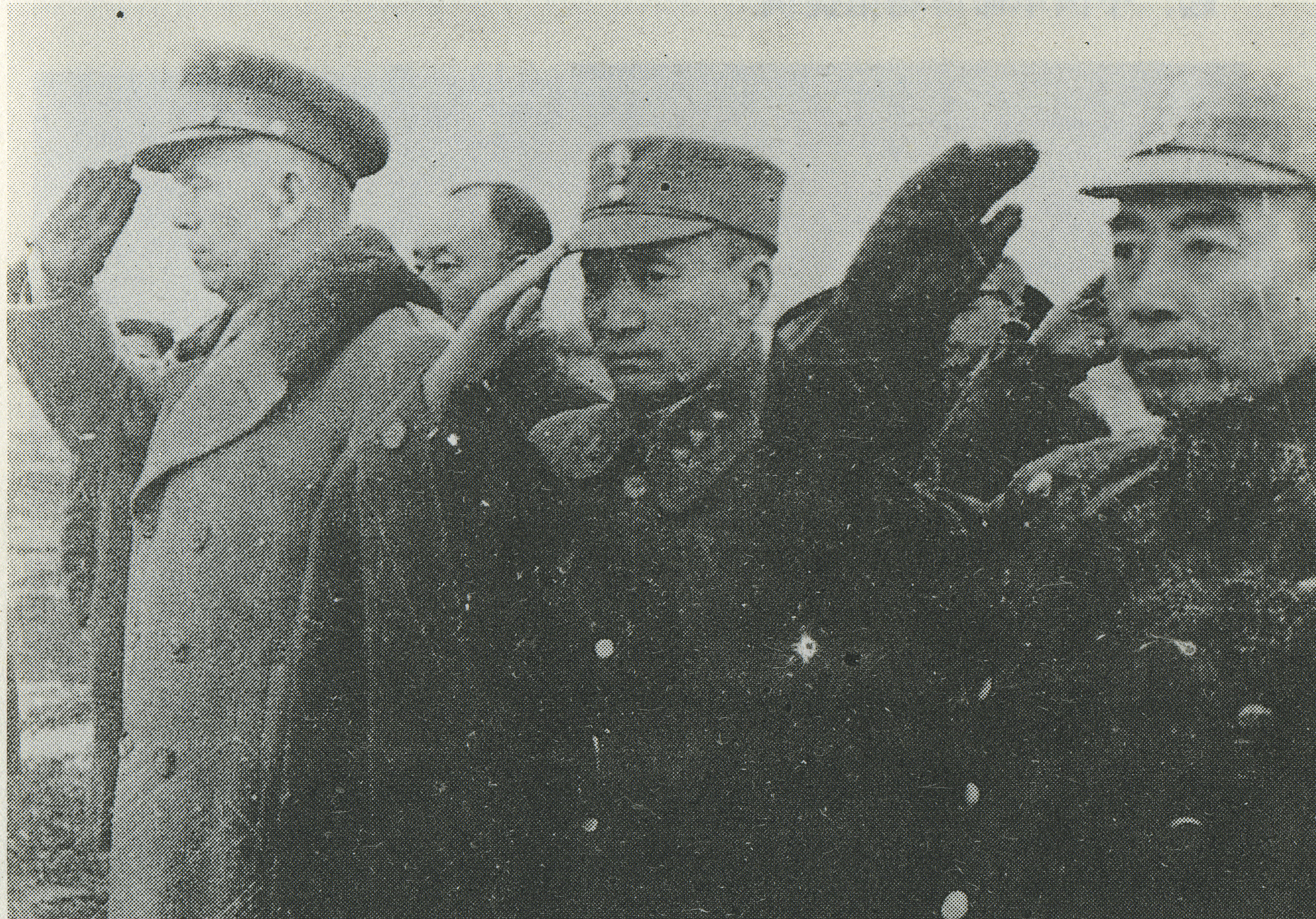
General Marshall with Zhang Zhizhong and Zhou Enlai (right) at Haokou in China, 1946

== Marshall arrives in China ==
Marshall arrived in China on 20 December 1945. His goal was to unify the Nationalists and the Communists with the hope that a strong non-Communist China would act as a bulwark against the encroachment of the Soviet Union.

Immediately, Marshall drew both sides into negotiations, which occurred for more than a year. No significant agreements were reached, as both sides used the time to further prepare themselves for the ensuing conflict.

The Gexin movement was among the KMT factions which strongly opposed the Marshall mission.

To assist in brokering a ceasefire between the Nationalists and the Communists, US sales of weapons and ammunition to the Nationalists were suspended between 29 July 1946 to May 1947.

Finally, in January 1947, exasperated with the failure of the negotiations, the Marshall mission left China. Marshall had already left in 1946, due to deteriorating health, domestic criticism of Truman's handling of the China situation, and other pressing foreign policy objectives. Soon, Marshall was appointed US Secretary of State.

The failure of the Marshall Mission signaled the renewal of the Chinese Civil War.

== Attack by MacArthur and McCarthy ==
On 9 June 1951, Douglas MacArthur charged that the post-war Marshall Mission to China had been "one of the greatest blunders in American diplomatic history, for which the free world is now paying in blood and disaster" in a telegram to Senator William F. Knowland. On 14 June 1951, as the Korean War stalemated in heavy fighting between American and Chinese forces, Republican Senator Joseph McCarthy attacked the Marshall Mission and stated that Marshall was directly responsible for the "loss of China," which turned from friend to enemy. McCarthy said the only way to explain why the US "fell from our position as the most powerful Nation on earth at the end of World War II to a position of declared weakness by our leadership" was because of "a conspiracy so immense and an infamy so black as to dwarf any previous such venture in the history of man." McCarthy argued that General Albert Coady Wedemeyer had prepared a wise plan that would keep China a valued ally but that it had been sabotaged; "only in treason can we find why evil genius thwarted and frustrated it." Specifically, McCarthy alleged:

When Marshall was sent to China with secret State Department orders, the Communists at that time were bottled up in two areas and were fighting a losing battle, but that because of those orders the situation was radically changed in favor of the Communists. Under those orders, as we know, Marshall embargoed all arms and ammunition to our allies in China. He forced the opening of the Nationalist-held Kalgan Mountain pass into Manchuria, to the end that the Chinese Communists gained access to the mountains of captured Japanese equipment. No need to tell the country about how Marshall tried to force Chiang Kai-shek to form a partnership government with the Communists.

Public opinion on Marshall's record became bitterly divided along party lines. In 1952, Dwight Eisenhower, who was running for and became US President, denounced the Truman administration's failures in Korea, campaigned alongside McCarthy, and refused to defend Marshall's policies.

== See also ==
- China White Paper, State Department defense of its actions issued in 1949
- Dixie Mission
- China Burma India Theater, against Japan
- Red Star Over China
- Wartime perception of the Chinese Communists

== Sources ==
- Brazinsky, Gregg. "The Birth of a Rivalry: Sino‐American Relations during the Truman Administration" in Daniel S. Margolies, ed., A Companion to Harry S. Truman (2012): 484–97.
- Feis, Herbert. The China tangle; the American effort in China from Pearl Harbor to the Marshall mission (1965) online
- Homeyard, Illoyna. "Another Look at the Marshall Mission to China." Journal of American-East Asian Relations (1992): 191–217.; disagrees with Levine (1979); the mission was in fact an attempt to lay the groundwork for the establishment of a stable, democratic China. in JSTOR
- Kurtz-Phelan, Daniel. The China Mission: George Marshall's Unfinished War, 1945–1947 (2018) except
- Levine, Steven I. "A New Look at American Mediation in the Chinese Civil War: the Marshall Mission and Manchuria." Diplomatic History 1979 3(4): 349–375. ISSN 0145-2096
- May, Ernest R. "1947–48: When Marshall Kept the U.S. out of War in China." Journal of Military History (2002) 66#4: 1001–1010. online
- Pogue, Forrest. George C. Marshall: Statesman 1945–1959 (1987) pp 51–143. online edition
- Purifoy, Lewis McCarroll. Harry Truman's China Policy. (Franklin Watts, 1976).
- Rose, Lisle Abbott. Roots of Tragedy: United States and the Struggle for Asia, 1945–53 (1976)
- Song, Yuwu, ed. Encyclopedia of Chinese-American Relations (2009)
- Stueck, William W. The Road to Confrontation: American Policy Toward China and Korea, 1947–1950, (1981)
- Tanner, Harold Miles. The Battle for Manchuria and the Fate of China: Siping, 1946 (Indiana University Press, 2013).
- Tsou, Tang. America's Failure in China, 1941–50 (1963), a view from the right
- Westad, Odd Arne. Decisive encounters: the Chinese civil war, 1946–1950 (Stanford University Press, 2003). excerpt

=== Primary sources ===
- Marshall, George Catlett. The Papers of George Catlett Marshall. Vol. 5: "The Finest Soldier," January 1, 1945 – January 7, 1947. Larry I. Bland and Sharon Ritenour Stevens, eds. Johns Hopkins U. Press, 2003. 822 pp.
- May, Ernest R. ed. The Truman Administration and China 1945–1949 (1975) summary plus primary sources. online
- Sharon Ritenour Stevens and Mark A. Stoler, ed. (2012). The Papers of George Catlett Marshall: "The Whole World Hangs in the Balance," January 8, 1947 – September 30, 1949. Johns Hopkins University Press. ISBN 978-1-4214-0792-0.
- US Congress, House, Committee on International Relations. Selected Executive Session Hearings of the Committee, 1943-50 (8 vols., Washington, 1976), Vol. VII: United States Policy in the Far East pt. 1 and Pt 2.
- U.S. Department of State. Foreign Relations of the United States: Diplomatic Papers, 1945. online
- ---. Volume VII. The Far East: China. Washington, D.C.: GPO, 1969.
- ---. Foreign Relations of the United States: Diplomatic Papers, 1946. Volume IX. The Far East: China. Washington, D.C.: GPO, 1972.
- ---. Foreign Relations of the United States: Diplomatic Papers, 1946. Volume X. The Far East: China. Washington, D.C.: GPO, 1972.
- ---. Foreign Relations of the United States: Diplomatic Papers, 1947. Volume VII. The Far East: China. Washington, D.C.: GPO, 1972.
