= Raymond P. Ludden =

- Born: June 6, 1909; Fall River, Massachusetts, United States
- Died: December 12, 1979 (aged 70); United States
- Education: Georgetown University School of Foreign Service
- Occupation: United States State Department Official

Raymond P. Ludden (June 6, 1909 - December 12, 1979) was a United States State Department expert on China.

Ludden was born in Fall River, Massachusetts, graduated from the Georgetown University School of Foreign Service, and in 1932 went to China, where he served for seventeen years. He spoke Mandarin Chinese fluently.

Ludden was interned by the Japanese in Shanghai the day after the attack on Pearl Harbor but was released the following year in what was then Portuguese East Africa (now Mozambique) as part of a diplomatic exchange arranged by the Swiss Red Cross. He volunteered to return to China and was subsequently detailed to Joseph W. Stilwell as a member of an elite political intelligence team.

The other three members of the team were John P. Davies, a China expert and leader of the team; John S. Service, a China expert; and John Emmerson, a Japan expert. All were Foreign Service Officers "on loan" to Stilwell from the State Department. Ludden held the rank of a field grade officer and served in Burma, where he was the first American to buy elephants to help in the construction of the supply route from India to China, and later in China as Stilwell's liaison to the 20th Bomber Command in Chengdu.

Stilwell had for some time locked horns with Jiang Jieshi (Chiang Kai-shek) over the conduct of the war and had become increasingly interested in the possibility of working with the Chinese Communist forces in order to carry out a landing on the North China coast. Jiang had strenuously opposed the idea but finally relented under pressure from President Roosevelt and allowed Stilwell to send a U.S. Army observer section to the Chinese Communist base area in Yan'an. Ludden was chosen to be part of it.

The observer section was known informally as the Dixie Mission, and it had both military and political objectives. The military objectives, broadly, were to find out whether or not the Communist forces were in fact fighting the Japanese and whether or not they were in fact willing to fight under Stilwell's command. The political objectives were, again broadly, to find out how much support the Communists had among the people, whether or not they had in fact turned away from Moscow and were pursuing their own uniquely Chinese vision of a socialist state, and whether or not they were sincere about wanting the friendship and support of the United States both during and after the war.

Ludden's role with the Dixie Mission was to travel through enemy-occupied territory with a small field group of seven Americans and a guerrilla bodyguard to the Communist Jin Cha Ji headquarters near Fouping. The other six members of the field group were Brook Dolan, Paul Domke, Walter Gress, Simon H. Hitch, Wilbur J. Peterkin (the group's leader), and Henry C. Whittlesey. The trip would last some four months and take them more than a thousand miles on foot and by mule through the dead of the Chinese winter with Japanese patrols in pursuit.

Ludden's objective was to find out if the political observations made by Jack Service, John Emmerson, and other observers in and around Yan'an held true throughout the areas controlled by the Communists. This information would be a critical factor in Stilwell's decision whether or not to work with the Communists. On the way back to Yan'an, Henry Whittlesey and his interpreter were captured and killed by the Japanese. Ludden was later awarded the Bronze Star, as were the other members of the field group.

The Dixie Mission played-out against a backdrop of political intrigue within the American camp. Patrick Hurley, who had been sent by Roosevelt as a personal emissary to China in order to pressure Jiang into cooperating with Stilwell, had instead sided with Jiang and had Stilwell recalled. When the American Ambassador resigned following Stilwell's recall, Hurley was appointed in his place and right away pressed for a policy of unconditional support for Jiang. He also purged his staff of anyone who disagreed.

When Ludden returned from Fouping and reported to Hurley in January 1945, Hurley was not interested in what he had seen and instead upbraided him for having gone to Fouping in the first place. It was, perhaps, a blessing in disguise. Although Ludden was one of Stilwell's political officers, the months he spent in Japanese occupied territory had prevented him from producing much of a paper trail. His observations and analyses were kept safely in his head but for a collection of brief entries in a small journal. This, and the award of a Bronze Star, allowed him to remain largely in under the radar and avoid the persecution to which Davies and Service would later be put by Hurley and other supporters of Jiang.

As a result, Ludden never fully told his side of the story. He spent the next several months on assignment in the United States while the controversy raged and the negotiations between Yan'an and Chongqing began to fall more and more apart. He was sent back to China following Hurley's resignation, and it was in the months to follow that he came to know several of the key players on both sides, especially Zhou Enlai. He remained in China until the communist revolution in 1949.

Ludden later went through the loyalty-security hearings of the McCarthy period and was cleared, but because of the controversy surrounding his work in China he was left to finish out his career in Europe. He retired to Massachusetts in 1961 and spent much of the next fifteen years studying and analyzing what had happened and why.

Ludden had seen firsthand how Hurley's policy of unconditional support for Jiang had undermined the negotiations that were going on between Chongqing and Yan'an and alienated the Communists at that critical moment when they clearly had tremendous popular support and were reaching out to the United States. It was, he felt, a mistake of tragic proportion, the effects of which can still be felt today.

The subsequent wars in Korea and Vietnam, he felt, would not have played out as they did if the United States had had China as a strategic partner in the region, nor would the monumental task of rebuilding China from the ground up after the war have played out as harshly as it did if China had in fact had the United States as a friend and partner. If peace and equality were the goals of American policy, he felt, the line between friend and enemy had been drawn in the wrong place. It is a lesson yet unlearned.

He died in 1979.
