= David D. Barrett =

American soldier, diplomat, and China expert (1892–1977)

David Dean Barrett
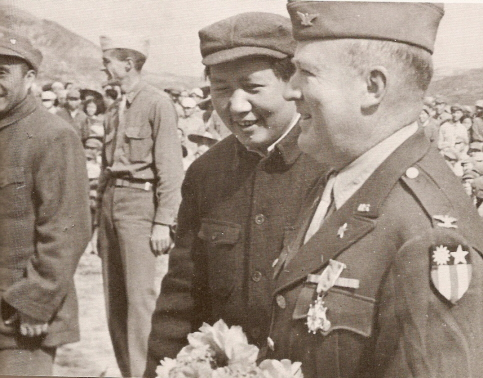
- Colonel Barrett with Mao Zedong
- Born: August 6, 1892; Central City, Colorado
- Died: February 3, 1977; San Francisco, California
- Military career
- Allegiance: United States
- Branch: United States Army
- Service years: 1909 - 1912, 1917 - 1953
- Rank: Colonel
- Commands: U.S. Army Observation Group to Yan'an
- Awards: Legion of Merit

David Dean Barrett (August 6, 1892 – February 3, 1977) was an American soldier, a diplomat, and an old Army China hand. Barrett served more than 35 years in the U.S. Army, almost entirely in China. Barrett was part of the American military experience in China, and played a critical role in the first official contact between the Chinese Communist Party and the United States government. He commanded the 1944 U.S. Army Observation Group, also known as the Dixie Mission, to Yan'an, China. However, his involvement in the Dixie Mission cost him promotion to general, when Presidential Envoy Patrick Hurley falsely accused Barrett of undermining his mission to unite the Communists and Nationalists.

== Early life ==
David Dean Barrett was born in Central City, Colorado. He enlisted in the United States Army in 1909 and served for three years. He then entered the University of Colorado Boulder, graduating when he was 23. He taught high school English for the next two years, but when the United States entered the First World War, he reenlisted, earning a commission as a second lieutenant. However, he spent the war serving in the United States.

He chose to make the military a career and volunteered to take part in the American expedition to Siberia to fight the Bolsheviks in 1920. Instead, his troopship was sent to the Insular Government of the Philippine Islands, where he spent the next four years. Barrett learned of an army program to train officers in foreign languages and signed up in hopes of traveling to Japan and learning its language. Disappointed once again, he was instead ordered to Beijing, China.

== Pre-war life in China ==
Barrett arrived in Beijing in 1924 and assumed the post of Assistant Military Attaché for Language Study. He mastered the Beijing dialect through five hours of practice with Mandarin teachers each day, followed by two hours of personal study. Barrett recalled this time as a joy and said the dialect spoken in the former imperial capital was "the most beautiful Chinese in the world."

Part of Barrett's education involved the study of the Chinese Classics, such as the Confucian Analects, and I Ching. Later in life, he impressed the Chinese by his ability to quote passages from the Classics. Barrett also made trips to the countryside to practice conversation with rural Chinese. In 1927, he was transferred to the Fifteenth Infantry Regiment headquarters in Tianjin. The executive officer of the regiment at the time was Lieutenant Colonel George C. Marshall, the future Secretary of State. Battalion commander of one of the two battalions stationed in Tianjin was then Major Joseph Stilwell. Barrett encountered the two again a year later at the Infantry School at Fort Benning, Georgia.

The three years he spent at the school and in the United States was an anomaly in a career that was spent almost entirely in China. By 1931, he was permanently assigned at the Fifteenth Infantry in Tianjin as a regimental intelligence staff officer. From that position, he watched the Kuomintang's encirclement campaigns against the Chinese Communists, who, in Barrett's opinion, were irresponsibly and wrongly designated as bandits by the KMT.

Barrett's tour of duty in Tianjin ended in 1934. Two years later, he was assigned to be an Assistant Military Attaché to the American Legation in Beiping (the then-name of Beijing). His executive officer in Beiping and acting Military Attaché, was Joseph Stilwell, then a full colonel.

Stationed in Tianjin and then Beiping, Barrett had a front-row seat to watch the growing Japanese encroachment on China. The most notable event that Barrett personally witnessed was the Marco Polo Bridge Incident in 1937, which began the Second Sino-Japanese War. On the day after the start of the conflict, July 8, Barrett was among the first foreign observers on the scene. Later the same day, Barrett returned with Stilwell, where both men were fired upon by the Imperial Japanese Army. It was, Barrett noted, the first and last time he ever heard a shot pass him in anger.

Due to his position in the American Legation in Beiping, Barrett moved with the Nationalist government as it fled the approach of the Japanese, first to Hankou, where Barrett often drove out to the front line to observe the fighting between the Chinese and Japanese forces. By 1938, Hankou fell and the Nationalists again retreated, this time to Chongqing. It was in Chongqing that Barrett remained until 1943.

== Second World War career ==
Barrett remained in the capacity of Assistant Military Attaché until May 1942, when he assumed the post of chief attaché inherited from General John Magruder. However, any sense of accomplishment for the post was stymied by the build-up of a major American military presence in China. It was because the position of attaché was attached to the embassy, and so Barrett was removed from much of the military planning and operations executed by the regular American military, whose presence was constantly growing in the capital. Another problem was the habit of Nationalist officials to bypass Barrett and communicate directly with the American military personnel.

Barrett remained in the position through the summer of 1943. Under the belief that he would never gain promotion to general officer, he requested a transfer out of the embassy detail. His wishes were granted and he found himself assigned to assist in the American creation of a Chinese field army at Guilin in the Guangxi Province in southern China. Due to supply failures and political entanglements, the army never advanced beyond the establishment of a headquarters. It was from that post that Barrett was plucked out and sent to command the observer group to Yan'an.

=== Command of the Dixie Mission ===
On March 24, Barrett received an order to proceed to Chongqing for temporary duty, unaware of the plans for the observer group to Yan'an. Not until he met John Service four days after his arrival in Chongqing, did he learn he was to assume command of the mission. At the time, Generalissimo Chiang Kai-shek had not yet provided his consent to the mission and Barrett waited a month in Chongqing before being ordered back to Guilin. He remained there until the start of July, when the success of Vice-president Henry Wallace's mission to Chongqing signaled a green light for the mission.

Colonel Barrett, Major Ray Cromley, Major Melvin Casbert, Captain John Colling, Captain Charles Stelle, Captain Paul Domke, 1st Lieutenant Henry Wittlesey, Staff Sergeant Anton Remeneh, US Embassy 2nd Secretary John S. Service and political attaché Raymond Ludden arrived in Yan'an on July 22, 1944. While Service handled political discussions, Barrett was in charge of working out a cooperative military strategy.

Barrett remained in command of the Dixie Mission until November 1944, when he was removed to help Ambassador Patrick Hurley in negotiations to unify the Nationalists and Communists, as well as help plan potential American-Communist cooperative plans at the theater headquarters of General Albert C. Wedemeyer. While serving as a courier and representative for Wedemeyer's chief of staff, General Robert B. McClure, Barrett was sent on two missions to Yan'an to speak with Communist leadership. The last discussion involved the possibility of a joint Communist-American military mission involving several thousands of American troops. As this plan, developed by McClure, hurt Hurley's attempts to bring the Communists into a joint-government plan, Hurley accused Barrett of sabotaging his negotiations. Hurley stopped a promotion in motion to make Barrett a brigadier general and had him removed to a small corner of the China theater for the rest of the war.

== Post-war life ==
Barrett left Mainland China in 1950 after the Communist Party seized control in the Chinese Civil War. One year later, he was falsely implicated as the leader of a conspiracy to have Antonio Riva and Ruichi Yamaguchi assassinate Mao Zedong with a mortar strike on Tiananmen Square during National Day celebrations. Although Riva and Yamaguchi were executed and several other expatriates were imprisoned, in 1971 Premier Zhou Enlai explained that claiming his involvement had been a mistake, apologized to Barrett, and invited him to visit the country again.

From 1950 to 1953, he served as the first Army attaché in Taiwan when the U.S. Embassy to the R.O.C. re-opened in the Taiwanese capital of Taipei, working along with Rear Admiral Harry B. Jarrett (Defense attaché) and Colonel LeRoy Heston (Air attaché). This was his last post before retiring from the U.S. Army.

As a civilian, Barrett served as a professor at the University of Colorado. He was instrumental in establishing a modern Chinese language course there and lectured in the modern history of China and occasionally in Shakespearean studies.

== See also ==
In 2013, the story of the Dixie Mission served as the historical basis for a new World War II novel called Two Sons of China, by Andrew Lam. Colonel Barrett is portrayed as a prominent historical figure in the book. It was released by Bondfire Books in December 2013.
