= Stelle =

Stelle may refer to:

== Fictional characters ==
- Stelle, the female form of the Trailblazer from the video game Honkai: Star Rail

== Music ==
- "Stelle" (song), 2026 single by Geolier

== People ==
- Charles C. Stelle (1910–1964), a United States diplomat
- Christian Delle Stelle (b. 1989), an Italian professional racing cyclist
- Helen Virginia Stelle (1884–1947), first director of the Tampa Free Library
- John Henry Stelle (1891–1962), U.S. political figure
- Michael Dalle Stelle (b. 1990), an Italian racing driver

== Places ==
- Stelle (Germany)
- Stelle, Illinois

== See also ==
- Stele, a type of religious monument
