= Wartime perception of the Chinese Communists =

Opinions of the CCP during World War II

The wartime perception of the Chinese Communists in the United States and other Western nations before and during World War II varied widely in both the public and government circles. The Soviet Union, whose support had been crucial to the Chinese Communist Party from its founding, also supported the Chinese Nationalist government to defeat Japan and to protect Soviet territory.

Founded in 1921, the Chinese Communist Party was initially allied with the Kuomintang (Chinese Nationalist Party) until the second half of the 1920s, when the former was purged from membership within the unified national government under Chiang Kai-shek. In 1934, the party nearly annihilated, and the remnants under the guidance of future Chairman Mao Zedong launched an ambitious retreat to escape destruction by the Kuomintang, known as the Long March. The Second Sino-Japanese War began in August 1937, and the Communists soon joined the United Front with the Nationalists, but by the time the United States was brought into the war by the Japanese attack on Pearl Harbor in 1941, the United Front had broken down.

During the war, there was much debate over the role of the Communist armies in fighting Japan, the nature of the Communist regime, and especially its intentions for co-operation or opposition after the war.

== In West ==
Much of the Western world was introduced to Chinese Communists in China on the eve the war in 1937 by Red Star Over China, a narrative of the Long March and an introductory biography to several Communist leaders, by the American journalist Edgar Snow. He reported that Mao was not a radical revolutionary, downplayed his calls for class struggle, and highlighted his anti-imperialist rhetoric, He later described Mao and the Communists as a progressive force, which desired a democratic free China. Writing for The Nation, Snow stated that the Chinese Communists "happen to have renounced, years ago now, any intention of establishing communism [in China] in the near future."

In 1944, when the invasion of Japan was still expected to launch from China, Washington sent the Dixie Mission to the Communist base in Yan'an. John Service, a Foreign Service Officer, visited in order to communicate and co-ordinate use of Communist armies against the Japanese. He praised the strength of their armies, urged communication with them to support the proposed invasion, and claimed that they were democratic reformers. He likened them to European socialists, rather than Soviet Communists, and claimed that they were less corrupt and chaotic than the Nationalists and that the Communists would preserve levels of capitalism for an extended time until a peaceful transition to a fully-realized communist society.

The United States discussed with Chiang's government whether to send aid to the Communists during the war. Frustrated with the Nationalists' disorganization and corruption, Ambassador to China Clarence Gauss recommended for the US to "pull up the plug and let the whole Chinese Government go down the drain". General Patrick Hurley accepted Stalin's assurance that the Chinese Communists were "radish Communists," red on the outside and white on the inside, and he insisted that the differences between the Communists and Nationalists were no greater than those between the Republicans and the Democrats in the United States. The pro-Nationalist China Lobby in the US promoted a romanticized image of China among the American public, portraying China as full of child-like people who aspired to become like Americans, seeking to adopt Christianity and American commercial and social lifestyles. They also claimed that China was an essential market for American agricultural and industrial goods, and was needed to solve the problem of expanding American commerce. This image made the US public mentally unprepared for the idea of a Communist takeover.

China Burma India Theater Commander Joseph Stilwell repeatedly claimed (in contradiction to Comintern statistics) that Communists were doing more than the KMT against Japan, and sought to cut off all US aid to Chiang.

Soviet Foreign Minister Vyacheslav Molotov told Hurley that Mao and the rest of the Chinese Communists were not really communists and that the Kremlin had no connections with them. The claims were accepted by Hurley at face value.

== In Soviet Union ==
Stalin privately underestimated the Chinese Communists and their ability to win a civil war. He instead encouraged them to make peace with the Nationalists. Stalin was worried that Mao would become an independent rival force in world communism and so preferred a divided China with Mao subordinate to the Nationalists.

== In China ==
During the war, the Communists avoided any radical class-related policies of wealth or land redistribution to maximise national unity against the Japanese. That was highly successful at raising the Communists' popularity, which reached its highest-ever level. In addition, the peasants joined them en masse only after the Japanese had invaded, rather than co-operate with the invaders. That shows that the Communists' popularity did not come from their land reform proposals or from rural poverty.

Wang Jingwei's puppet regime, backed by Japan, produced extensive propaganda claiming that its main purpose was anti-communism, which backfired and further helped to bolster the legitimacy of the Communists among the peasant victims of Japanese reprisals.

The Nationalists' right wing objected to the Communists' expansion of influence during the guerilla campaigns and was attacked on patriotic grounds. The Communists gained popular legitimacy for their actions as long as they were carrying out resistance against Japan with greater aggressiveness than the Nationalists. That advantage was used by the Communists, as is seen by the New Fourth Army Incident.

== In Japan ==
The Japanese described the communist guerillas of the New Fourth Army as inferior in weapons to that of the Nationalists but superior in training and discipline. One report noted that local residents in Fuan and Anfeng welcomed the orderly Communist troops because of their good treatment of the locals.

The Japanese military treated the Chinese Communists with contempt, dismissed their own intelligence officers' reports of Communist strength, and insisted that the Communists were nothing more than bandits, which led to the Hundred Regiments Offensive becoming an absolute shock for the Imperial Japanese Army.

== See also ==
- Chinese Communist Party
- People's Republic of China
- History of the People's Republic of China
- Chinese Civil War
- Dixie Mission
- China Hands
