= Ray Cromley =

American journalist

Raymond Avolon Cromley
- Born: August 23, 1910
- Died: February 23, 2007 (aged 96)
- Military career
- Allegiance: United States of America
- Branch: United States Army
- Rank: Colonel
- Conflicts: World War II
- Awards: Bronze Star, Legion of merit
- Other work: Writer for The Wall Street Journal

Raymond A. Cromley (August 23, 1910 – February 23, 2007) was an American journalist.

He was born in Tulare, California to William James Cromley and Grace Violet Bailey Cromley. He earned a BS in Physics from Caltech in 1933. After attending Japanese language school in California, he went to work for the Wall Street Journal in Tokyo, Japan. There, he met Masuyo "Marjorie" Sudo (Suto), and they were married in 1938. Dr. Sudo was a graduate of the Imperial Women's Medical College, and worked as a researcher at Tokyo Imperial University. Their son, Donald Stowe Cromley was born in Tokyo in January, 1939. In December, 1941, Ray Cromley was arrested by the Japanese army and imprisoned until June 2, 1942 when he was sent with other American prisoners of war to Internment Camp Simure. Raymond and Donald Cromley left Yokohama on the Asamu Maru prisoner exchange ship on June 25, 1942. In July, 1942 they transferred in Laurenco Marques, Mozambique to the MS Gripsholm, a Swedish exchange ship chartered by the US government to return Americans from Asia.

Cromley rose to the rank of Colonel in the United States Army and spent his civilian career as a Journalist. Prior to the Second World War, Cromley was a correspondent and journalist in Japan. Following its outbreak, Cromley joined the American army and served in the China Burma India Theater. He was a member of the United States Army Observation Group to Yenan, better known as the Dixie Mission. After the war, he went on to become a writer for The Wall Street Journal. He is buried in Arlington National Cemetery.

== See also ==
- Dixie Mission
