= LeRoy Heston =

American colonel (1903–1982)

- Born: May 25, 1903; Grants Pass, Oregon, U.S.
- Died: April 10, 1982 (aged 78)
- Occupation: Pilot

Leroy Gray Heston (May 25, 1903 – April 10, 1982) was a Colonel of the United States Air Force and a pilot serving in the Army Air Corps starting in 1929. He also served on contract with Col. Claire Lee Chennault to help train the Republic of China Air Force (ROCAF) pilots in the 1930s. He served again with Army Air Corps during World War II, and with the Air Force in Korea, after that he served as the first Air attaché in Taiwan from 1950 to 1951, when the U.S. Embassy re-opened in the Taiwanese capital of Taipei, working along with Rear Admiral Harry B. Jarrett (Defense attaché) and Colonel David D. Barrett (Army attaché). He was the nephew of Michigan football star Willie Heston. LeRoy played as a substitute running back himself.
