= Loss of China =

1949 US political crisis

In American political discourse, the "loss of China" refers to the victory of the Chinese Communist Party over the U.S.-backed Nationalist Chinese Kuomintang government at the end of the Chinese Civil War. The defeat of Chiang Kai-shek's government was an immense shock to the American public, who subsequently saw the "loss" as a result of the Truman administration's supposed weakness towards communism. The "loss of China" was cast as a massive defeat for America in the early stages of the Cold War, and greatly contributed to the anti-communist paranoia that drove the Second Red Scare.

== Background ==
During World War II, Franklin D. Roosevelt had assumed that China, under Chiang Kai-shek's leadership, would become a great power after the war, along with the U.S., the United Kingdom, and the Soviet Union. Historian Arthur Waldron argues that Roosevelt mistakenly thought of China as being securely held by Chiang Kai-shek, when in reality his hold on power was actually tenuous. John Paton Davies Jr., one of the "China Hands" who helped shape America's policy towards China, disagreed with Roosevelt's stance. Davies wrote later that he and the Foreign Service officers in China had reported to Washington that material support to Chiang Kai-shek during the war against Japan would not transform the Nationalist government, adding that Roosevelt's poor choice of personal emissaries to China contributed to the failure of his policy. Thus, Davies predicted that after the war China would become a power vacuum tempting to Moscow, and the Nationalists would not be able to deal with them. In that sense, says Waldron, "the collapse of China into communism was aided by the incompetence of Roosevelt's policy."

== Loss ==
In 1949, the fall of the Kuomintang government was widely viewed within the United States as a catastrophe. The author William Manchester described the American public's reaction in his 1973 book, The Glory and the Dream:

The China it knew—Pearl Buck's peasants, rejoicing in the good earth—had been dependable, democratic, warm and above all pro-American. Throughout the great war the United Nations Big Four had been Churchill, Roosevelt, Stalin and Chiang. Stalin's later treachery had been deplorable but unsurprising. But Chiang Kai-shek! Acheson's strategy to contain Red aggression seemed to burst wide open. [...] Everything American diplomats had achieved in Europe—the Truman Doctrine, the Marshall Plan, NATO—momentarily seemed annulled by this disaster in Asia.

In August 1949, Secretary of State Dean Acheson issued the China White Paper, a compilation of official documents to defend the administration's record and argue that there was little that the United States could have done to prevent Communist victory in the civil war. At the time, Acheson's China White Paper with its catalog of $2 billion worth of American aid provided to China since 1946 was widely mocked as an excuse for allowing what was widely seen as a geopolitical disaster which allowed the formation of a Sino-Soviet bloc with the potential to dominate Eurasia.

The white paper outraged Mao Zedong, who wrote a number of articles responding to the report. Mao asked why Truman would provide so much support to Nationalist forces if he believed them to be so "demoralized and unpopular." Mao stated that since Truman's position of supporting a demoralized and unpopular Nationalist government was otherwise irrational, Truman must have been acting out of imperialist ambitions "to slaughter the Chinese people" by needlessly prolonging the war.

== Aftermath ==
The "loss of China" was portrayed by critics of the Truman Administration as an "avoidable catastrophe". It led to a "rancorous and divisive debate" and the issue was exploited by the Republicans at the polls in 1952. It also played a large role in the rise of Senator Joseph McCarthy, who, with his allies, sought scapegoats for the "loss." They notably targeted figures in the U.S. State Department like Owen Lattimore, an influential scholar of Central Asia.

=== McCarthy's Wheeling speech ===
In his speech on 7 February 1950 in Wheeling, West Virginia before the Ohio County Women's Republican Club, Senator McCarthy blamed Acheson, whom he called "this pompous diplomat in striped pants", for the "loss of China", making the sensationalist claim:

"While I cannot take the time to name all of the men in the State Department who have been named as members of the Communist Party and members of a spy ring, I have here in my hand a list of 205...a list of names that were known to the Secretary of State and who nevertheless are still working and shaping the policy of the State Department".

The speech, which McCarthy repeated shortly afterwards in Salt Lake City, made him into a national figure. The Truman administration was attacked by McCarthy for supposedly allowing "Communists and queers" into the State Department, who were subsequently responsible for the "loss." In a speech, which said much about the fears of American masculinity going "soft" that were commonplace in the 1950s, McCarthy charged that "prancing minions of the Moscow party line" had been in charge of policy towards China in the State Department, while the Secretary of State Dean Acheson was a "dilettante diplomat who cringed before the Soviet colossus".

=== Effect of the Marshall Mission ===
On 9 June 1951, Douglas MacArthur laid blame for the loss on the post-war Marshall Mission to China, a failed diplomatic mission led by George Marshall which had sought to unify the Kuomintang and Communist forces. In a telegram to Senator William F. Knowland, MacArthur called it "one of the greatest blunders in American diplomatic history, for which the free world is now paying in blood and disaster." On June 14, 1951, as the Korean War stalemated into heavy fighting between American and Chinese forces, Joseph McCarthy also attacked the Marshall Mission, stating that George Marshall was directly responsible for the "loss" of China. The senator said the only way to explain why the US "fell from our position as the most powerful Nation on earth at the end of World War II to a position of declared weakness by our leadership" was because of "a conspiracy so immense and an infamy so black as to dwarf any previous such venture in the history of man." McCarthy also argued that General Albert Coady Wedemeyer had prepared a wise plan that would keep China a valued ally, but that it had been sabotaged; "only in treason can we find why evil genius thwarted and frustrated it." Specifically, McCarthy alleged:

When Marshall was sent to China with secret State Department orders, the Communists at that time were bottled up in two areas and were fighting a losing battle, but that because of those orders the situation was radically changed in favor of the Communists. Under those orders, as we know, Marshall embargoed all arms and ammunition to our allies in China. He forced the opening of the Nationalist-held Kalgan Mountain pass into Manchuria, to the end that the Chinese Communists gained access to the mountains of captured Japanese equipment. No need to tell the country about how Marshall tried to force Chiang Kai-shek to form a partnership government with the Communists.

=== McCarran Report ===
The report of the Senate Internal Security Subcommittee in 1951, written by Senator Pat McCarran, concluded that China was indeed "lost" because of the policy followed by the State Department, declaring: "Owen Lattimore and John Carter Vincent were influential in bringing about a change in United States policy [...] favorable to the Chinese Communists." Although McCarran was careful not to call Lattimore a Soviet spy in his report, which would have allowed him to sue for libel, he came very close with the statement: "Owen Lattimore was, from some time beginning in the 1930s, a conscious, articulate instrument of the Soviet conspiracy."

In response to the McCarran report, an editorial in The Washington Post attacked the thesis "that China was a sort of political dependency of the United States to be retained or given away to Moscow by a single administrative decision taken in Washington":

It was not. China was—and still is—a vast continental land, diverse and disunited, peopled by some half a billion human beings—most of them living at a level of bare subsistence, immemorially exploited by landlords and harassed by warlords, in the throes of revolutionary pressures and counter-pressures that have been felt the world over. The United States has never at any time been in a position to exercise more than a minor influence on China's destiny. China was lost by the Chinese."

=== Political impact ===
As a result of events like the Chinese Communists' victory, public opinion on Marshall's overall record became bitterly divided along party lines. In 1952, Dwight Eisenhower, who was running for President, refused to defend any of Marshall's policies. Eisenhower also denounced the Truman administration's failures in Korea, and campaigned alongside McCarthy. The personal relationship between Eisenhower and Truman was damaged by these campaign strategies, however Eisenhower won the election and became president in 1953, the first Republican to do so since Herbert Hoover in 1928.

== Reception and analysis ==
One of the more imaginative and popular books about the "loss of China" was the 1952 book The Shanghai Conspiracy by General Charles A. Willoughby. In it, Willoughby claimed that a Soviet spy ring, headed by Richard Sorge (arrested in 1941 and executed in 1944), was still in existence. Furthermore, this Sorge spy ring had both caused the "loss of China" in 1949, and was in the process of steadily taking over the U.S. government. The American Japanologist Michael Schaller wrote that Willoughby was indeed correct on some points, as Richard Sorge was a spy for the Soviet Union and the same was probably true of certain left-wing American journalists that worked with Sorge in 1930's Shanghai, but much of the book merely reflected the paranoid mind of one of the most incompetent military intelligence officers in American history.

Noam Chomsky, a leading critic of U.S. foreign policy, has commented that the terminology "loss of China" is revealing of U.S. foreign policy attitudes:

In 1949, China declared independence, an event known in Western discourse as "the loss of China"—in the US, with bitter recriminations and conflict over who was responsible for that loss. The terminology is revealing. It is only possible to lose something that one owns. The tacit assumption was that the U.S. owned China, by right, along with most of the rest of the world, much as postwar planners assumed. The "loss of China" was the first major step in "America's decline." It had major policy consequences.

In a 2010 book review, Chinese American historian Miles Yu criticized the "endless fight over who got it right on China, whatever the Chinese reality. That is to say, in the peculiar debate on Communist China, the questions asked and the issues debated often reflected American partisan politics and policy spins rather than Chinese reality."

== See also ==
- George Atcheson, Jr.
- Brooks Atkinson
- China lobby
- Chinese Civil War
- Cold War
- Dixie Mission
- History of China
- Henry Luce
- Marshall Mission
- McCarthyism
- John S. Service
- Venona
- Albert C. Wedemeyer
