= Wilbur J. Peterkin =

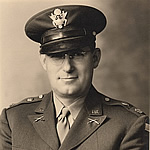
- Wilbur J. Peterkin
- Born: February 13, 1904; Clinton, Iowa, U.S.
- Died: May 3, 1996 (age 92); Puyallup, Washington, U.S.
- Military career
- Allegiance: United States of America
- Service years: 1941–1946; 1946–1964 (USAR)
- Rank: Colonel
- Nickname: Pete
- Commands: U.S. Army Observation Group to Yenan; 415th Infantry Regiment, 104th Infantry Division - USAR
- Conflicts: China Offensive; China Defensive
- Awards: American Defense Service Medal; Asiatic Pacific Service Medal with 2 Bronze Stars; Combat Infantrymans Badge
- Other work: Taught bookkeeping and commercial law at Sumner High School, Sumner Washington, and at Franklin Pierce High School, Parkland (Tacoma), Washington

Colonel Wilbur J. Peterkin (February 13, 1904 – May 3, 1996) was a lieutenant colonel in the United States Army during the Second World War in the China Burma India Theater, and an executive and commanding officer of the United States Army Observer Group, commonly known as the Dixie Mission. Prior to the war, Peterkin was a high school teacher in Sumner, Washington. Before commanding Dixie, Peterkin had spent almost two years in China.

Peterkin went to school in Polson, Montana, and Portland, Oregon. He received a B.S. in military science and education from the University of Oregon where he was drum major of the university band (he played the baritone and tuba, later directing the high school band in Sumner, Washington). He was an infantry instructor in Fort Benning, Georgia, from 1941–1943. From 1943-44 he trained Kuomintang officers in South China. After World War II he served with the 415th Infantry Regiment, 104th Infantry Division (Reserve) from 1946–1964, and was the commanding officer 1948–1957.

== Resources ==
- William P. Head, Yenan!: Colonel Wilbur Peterkin and the American Military Mission to the Chinese Communists, 1944–1945 (Chapel Hill, N.C.: Documentary Publications, 1987).
- Colonel W. J. Peterkin, Inside China 1943-1945: An Eyewitness Account of America's Mission in Yenan (Baltimore: Gateway Press, 1992).
- Carolle J. Carter, Mission to Yenan: American Liaison with the Chinese Communists 1944-1947 (Lexington: University of Kentucky Press, 1997).
- Obituary, Wilbur James Peterkin, Tacoma News Tribune, Tacoma, Washington, May 5, 1996

== See also ==
- Dixie Mission
- China Burma India Theater
