= Charles C. Stelle =

United States diplomat (1910–1964)

Charles C. Stelle (25 October 1910 – 11 June 1964) was a United States diplomat.

== Early life ==
Stelle was born to missionary parents in Peking in 1910, and lived in China until he was 14 years old.

== Career ==
During World War II, Stelle worked on the Far East for the Office of Strategic Services (OSS). Stelle was a member of the Dixie Mission (1944–1947), an American observation mission to Yan'an, China, to investigate the Chinese Communists.
