= Dixie Mission =

1940s US effort to establish relations with the Chinese Communist Party

U.S. Army Observation Group to Yan'an
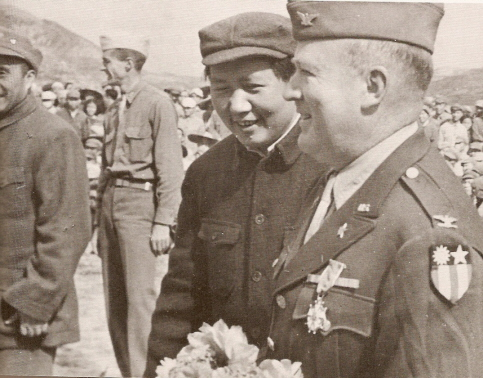
- Colonel David D. Barrett with Mao Zedong
- Active: 22 July 1944 – 11 March 1947
- Country: United States of America
- Branch: Army and Navy
- Part of: China Burma India Theater
- Nickname: Dixie Mission

Commanders
- Notable commanders: Colonel David D. Barrett

The United States Army Observation Group (Chinese: 美軍觀察組; pinyin: Měijūn Guānchá Zǔ), commonly known as the Dixie Mission (Chinese: 迪克西使團; pinyin: Díkèxī Shǐtuán), was the first US effort to gather intelligence and establish relations with the Chinese Communist Party and the People's Liberation Army, then headquartered in the mountainous city of Yan'an, Shaanxi. The mission was launched on 22 July 1944, during World War II, and lasted until 11 March 1947. The goals of the mission were to investigate the Communists politically and militarily and to determine if the US would benefit from establishing liaison.

John S. Service, of the US Department of State, was responsible for political analysis, and Colonel David D. Barrett, of the US Army, performed the military analysis. Initially, they reported that the Chinese Communists might be a useful wartime and postwar ally and that the atmosphere in Yan'an was more energetic and less corrupt than in Nationalist-held areas. After the war, the Dixie Mission's reports and Service and Barrett were condemned by pro-Kuomintang factions in the American government. In the subsequent debate over the "loss of China", many put the blame on wartime China Hands. Service was fired from the State Department, and Barrett was denied a promotion to brigadier general.

== Origin ==
Prior to the Dixie Mission, the US considered military interventions into Communist-held China, such as an unimplemented idea of the Office of Strategic Services to send agents into northern China. The Dixie Mission began, according to John Paton Davies Jr.'s memo, on 15 January 1944. Davies, a Foreign Service Officer who was serving in the China Burma India Theater (CBI), called for the establishment of an observers' mission in Communist territory. Davies argued that the Communists offered attractive strategic benefits in the fight against Japan and that the more the US ignored them, the closer that Yan'an, the capital of Communist-held China, would move to Moscow. With the support of Davies' superior, General Joseph Stilwell, the memorandum successfully convinced the administration of US President Franklin D. Roosevelt to put the plan into motion.

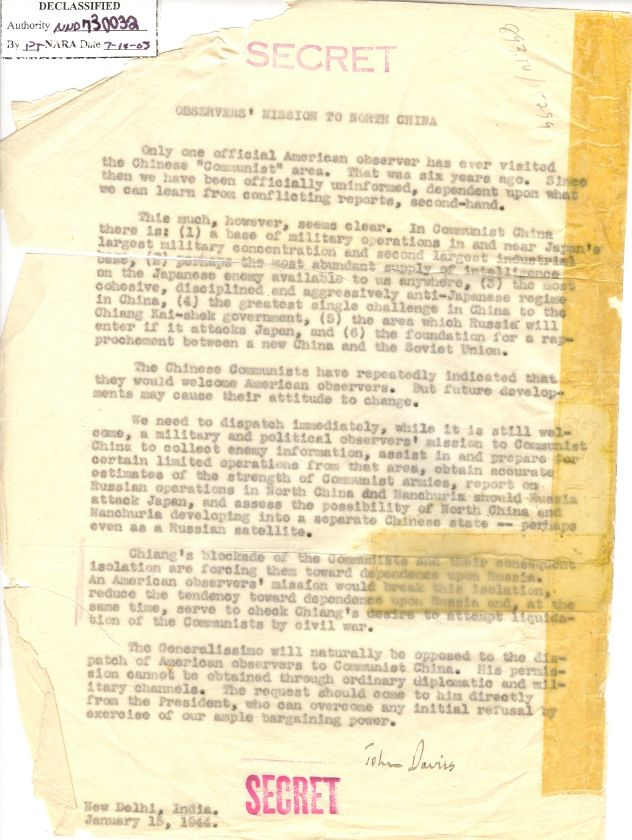
Davies' 15 January Memo

The Roosevelt administration asked Chinese Nationalist leader Chiang Kai-shek for permission to send US observers to visit the Communists. Initially, Chiang was hostile to the proposal and delayed action. He consented after foreign correspondents whom he had permitted to visit Yan'an reported on the Communists to US readers. Chiang agreed after American Vice-president Henry A. Wallace made a state visit to Chongqing, the Nationalists' capital, in late June 1944. John Carter Vincent, an experienced State Department China expert, assisted Wallace in persuading Chiang to allow the US to visit the Communists in Yan'an without Nationalist supervision. In exchange, the US promised to replace the American commander of the Burma India Theater, General Stilwell, who was removed from command in October 1944.

== Arrival in Yan'an ==
=== First arrivals ===
The first members of the Dixie Mission arrived in Yan'an on 22 July 1944, on an Army C-47. This team consisted of Colonel David D. Barrett, John S. Service, Major Melvin A. Casberg, Major Ray Cromley, Captain John G. Colling, Captain Charles C. Stelle, Captain Paul C. Domke, 1st Lieutenant Henry S. Whittlesey, and Staff Sergeant Anton H Remenih.

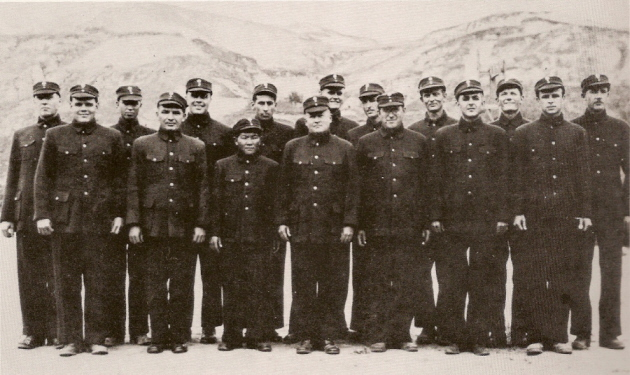
The Dixie Mission in Zhongshan suits, a gift from their hosts.

The second half of the team arrived on 7 August and consisted of Raymond P. Ludden, Lieutenant Colonel Reginald E. Foss, Major Wilbur J. Peterkin, Major Charles E. Dole, Captain Brooke Dolan, Lieutenant Simon H. Hitch, 1st Lieutenant Louis M. Jones, Sergeant Walter Gress, and Technician 4th Class George I. Nakamura. Later, other members, including Koji Ariyoshi, joined the mission.

=== At work in Yan'an ===
Service, while under Stilwell's command, served as a diplomatic observer for both Stilwell and the American embassy in Chongqing. Over the next three months, he sent a series of reports to Chongqing and sparked controversy immediately. Service praised the Communists and compared them to European socialists, rather than the feared Soviet Union. Service credited the Communists for a clean and superior society, in stark contrast to the corruption and chaos that he saw in the Nationalist areas, which were controlled by Chiang. However, Service was accused of being biased by the Senate Committee of the U.S. Congress. After visiting Yan'an, Service advocated that the US should work with the forces opposed to the Nationalists, such as the Communists, but he did not advocate abandoning Chiang. That opinion was shared by John Paton Davies, a position that ruined both careers.

Colonel David Barrett evaluated the communists' military potential by observing war games between Communist troops and visiting war schools set up to train the Chinese officer corps. Barrett felt the Communists emphasized indoctrinating their soldiers over military training, but he believed that American advisors could train the Communist soldiers to become excellent fighters.

The Americans were impressed by the Communists' attacks on the Japanese, often in guerrilla raids. The last significant Communist military campaign against the Japanese had occurred four years earlier in the successful Hundred Regiments Campaign by the Chinese Communist 8th Route Army. However, due to subsequent retaliatory measures by the Japanese, the Communists avoided further large campaigns and restricted their activities to guerrilla warfare.

== Diplomacy ==
=== Hurley Mission ===
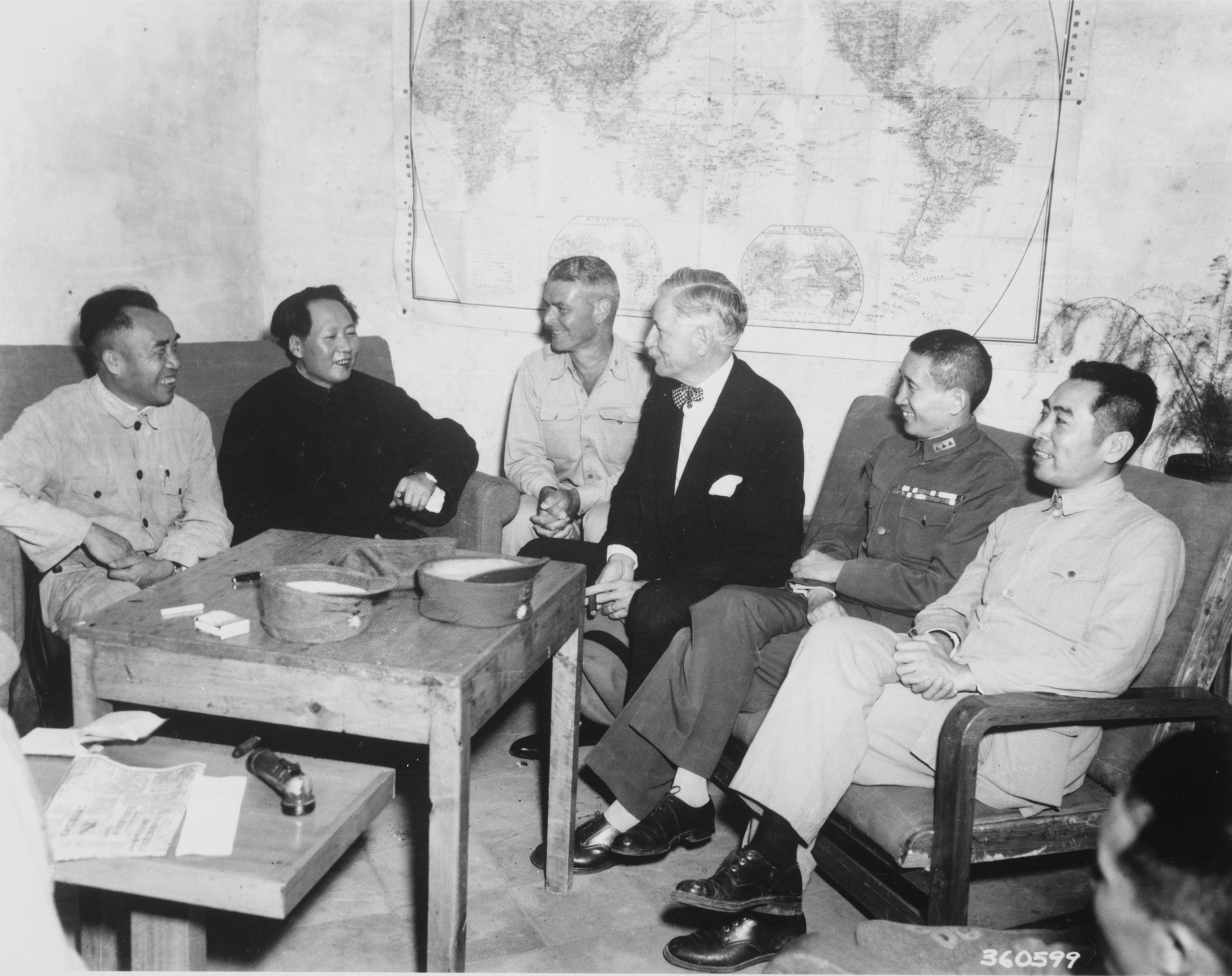
Hurley conversing with Mao Zedong and other Chinese Communist leadership after his promotion to ambassador to China; subsequent Prime Minister Zhou Enlai is at far right

On 7 November 1944, General Patrick Hurley arrived in Yan'an. Hurley had been in the CBI Theater since August as part of an agreement between Wallace and Chiang to provide a liaison for Chiang to communicate directly with Roosevelt and to circumvent Stilwell. Successful in negotiating in the private sector, Hurley was sent to China to improve operations in the China Theater, which he extended to uniting the Nationalists and the Communists in a unified government. Hurley approached the Communists and the Nationalists without knowledge of either political group, and he believed that their differences were no greater than those between the Republican and Democratic Parties in the United States. The first postwar peace negotiation was attended by both Chiang and Mao in Chongqing from 28 August 1945 and concluded on 10 October 1945 with the signing of the Double Tenth Agreement. Hurley failed at reconciling the Nationalists and Communists and blamed Dixie Mission staff, John Service and John Paton Davies, and others.

=== Marshall and Wedemeyer Missions ===
Following the Japanese surrender, the Nationalists and the Communists resumed the Chinese Civil War, which they had set aside in the United Front to fight the Japanese in 1937. In December 1945, US President Harry S. Truman sent General George C. Marshall to China to negotiate a ceasefire and to form a unified government between the Communists and the Nationalists. While Marshall spent most of his time in Chongqing, the Dixie Mission hosted Marshall in Yan'an so he could speak with the Communist leadership. Like Hurley, Marshall failed to develop a lasting compromise, and the Chinese Civil War resumed.

General George C. Marshall and Mao Zedong in Yan'an

Truman then sent another representative to China, General Albert Wedemeyer, who had commanded US troops in China during the war, on a factfinding mission. Again, the Dixie Mission in Yan'an hosted the presidential mission. Wedemeyer reported that US interests were best served by continued support for the Nationalist government, but Truman suppressed the report because he wanted to see who would win and refused to expand aid the Nationalists to avoid being involved in the Chinese Civil War. After Wedemeyer's visit, the US packed up operations in Yan'an and liquidated everything that could not be transported aboard a C-47. On 11 March 1947, the last members of the Dixie Mission left Yan'an.

== Question of Communist Party subterfuge ==
Dixie Mission participants such as John Service were criticized for viewing the Communist leadership as socialist agrarian reformers, who claimed that China under their rule would not follow the violent path of the Soviet Union under the Bolsheviks. Instead, socialism would come to China only after economic reforms that preserved capitalism to mature the society to a point that it would be prepared for a peaceful transition to a communist society. That belief was disseminated to the American people prior to and during the war by the popular authors Edgar Snow and Agnes Smedley. In his 3 August 1944 report, "The Communist Policy Towards the Kuomintang," Service underlined his opinion of the Communists as such and stated:

And the impressive personal qualities of the Communist leaders, their seeming sincerity, and the coherence and logical nature of their program leads me, at least, toward general acceptance of the first explanation – that the Communists base their policy toward the Kuomintang on a real desire for democracy in China under which there can be orderly economic growth through a stage of private enterprise to eventual socialism without the need of violent social upheaval and revolution.

After the Dixie Mission, Colonel Barrett reflected upon this position and wrote in his memoir:

In addition, I had fallen to some extent, not as much perhaps as did some other foreigners, for the "agrarian reformer" guff. I should have known better than this, particularly since the Chinese Communists themselves never at any time made claim to being anything but revolutionaries – period.

The history of China did not have the Communists pursue a slow gradual change in the economy, as some had believed in 1944. Regardless, 25 years later, Service believed that American co-operation with the Communists might have prevented the excesses that occurred under Mao Zedong's postwar leadership. After the same number of years, John Davies, in his memoir, Dragon by the Tail, defended his belief that the Communist would have been a better Chinese ally for the US than the Kuomintang. Davies believes that the US interests would have been better served allying with the Communists based on realpolitik considerations. Allying with the Communists would have prevented it from allying with the Soviet Union and lessened the risk and anxiety that the US and the rest of the world experienced in the Cold War.

== Aftermath and legacy ==
The Dixie Mission had consequences for individuals and the United States. Many participants were accused of being communists, such as John Davies and John Service. Both were subjected to multiple congressional investigations, which consistently found that they were not Communist Party members, agents of foreign powers, or disloyal to the United States. That did not spare Service from termination at the State Department. He appealed this decision, and ultimately, the US Supreme Court ruled in his favor. Davies was exiled from China, his field of expertise by Hurley. Then, he was hounded from a position in Russia to an inconsequential post in South America. Davies, forced from the State Department, founded the Estilo furniture factory which built award-winning furniture. Hurley accused Colonel David Barrett of sabotaging his diplomacy with the Kuomintang and the Communists. He succeeded in preventing Barrett from promotion to brigadier general even though Barrett's promotion was endorsed by the theater commander, General Albert C. Wedemeyer. Barrett was retained in the China Theater but placed in an inferior position.

Misperceptions of the Dixie Mission contributed to the nationwide Red Scare in the 1950s and 1960s. Thawing relations between the United States and the People's Republic of China in the 1970s opened a new chapter for the mission. Many of the mission's participants were among the first Americans invited to visit China in 20 years. In China, the Dixie Mission is remembered as a positive time between the two nations and a symbol of Sino-American co-operation.

In 2013, the story of the Dixie Mission served as the historical basis for a new World War II novel, Two Sons of China, by Andrew Lam. It was released by Bondfire Books in December 2013.

== Nickname ==
While referred to as "Dixie" or the Dixie Mission, the true name of the mission was the United States Army Observation Group to Yan'an. One war scholar attributes the name to the number of Southerners in the mission's personnel. John Davies declared in his memoir, Dragon by the Tail, that the mission was called 'Dixie', as a reference to its location within "rebel" Communist-held territory, by himself and his peers, a glib comparison to the territory of the Confederate States of America.

== Notable members ==
- Colonel David D. Barrett (1892–1977), first commanding officer of the Dixie Mission.
- John S. Service (1909–1999), first State Department representative to arrive and operate as part of the Dixie Mission.
- John P. Davies (1908–1999), State Department official instrumental in the creation of the mission.
- Koji Ariyoshi (1914–1976), Hawaii labor editor and later a leader of the U.S.-China People's Friendship Association.
- Raymond P. Ludden (1909–1970), State Department officer who undertook dangerous mission into Japanese occupied China.
- Henry C. Whittlesey, a writer
- Colonel Raymond Allen Cromley

=== Dixie Mission Commanding Officers ===
- Colonel David D. Barrett
- Colonel Ivan D. Yeaton (1945–1946)
- Colonel Morris DePass
- Colonel Wilbur J. Peterkin
- Major Clifford F. Young
- Colonel John Sells
- Colonel Raymond A. Cromley

== See also ==
- Category:Dixie Mission participants
- Second Sino-Japanese War
- Wartime perception of the Chinese Communists

== Sources ==
=== Primary sources ===
- David D. Barrett, Dixie Mission: The United States Army Observer Group in Yenan, 1944 (Berkeley, CA: Center for Chinese Studies, U of California, 1970).
- John Colling, The Spirit of Yenan: A Wartime Chapter of Sino-American Friendship (Hong Kong: API Press, 1991).
- John Paton Davies, Dragon by the Tail: American, British, Japanese, and Russian Encounters with China and One Another (New York: W. W. Norton, 1972).
- Colonel Wilbur J. Peterkin, Inside China 1943–1945: An Eyewitness Account of America's Mission in Yenan (Baltimore: Gateway Press, 1992)
- Koji Ariyoshi, From Kona to Yenan: The Political Memoirs of Koji Ariyoshi, Beechert, Edward D., and Alice M. Beechert, eds, (Honolulu, HI: U of Hawai'i Press, 2000).
- Harrison Forman (1946). Report From Red China. London: Robert Hale.
- John Emmerson,The Japanese Thread: A Life in the U.S. Foreign Service(New York: Holt, Rinehart and Winston, 1978).
- Joseph W. Esherick, Lost Chance in China: The World War II Despatches of John S. Service (New York: Random House, 1974).
- Peter Vladimirov, The Vladimirov Diaries: Yenan, China: 1942–1945 (New York: Doubleday & Co., 1975).

=== Secondary sources ===
- Bergin, Bob (2019). "Intelligence Lost in Politics: The Dixie Mission 1944: The First US Intelligence Encounter with the Chinese Communists" (PDF). Studies in Intelligence. 63 (3): 11–30.
- Carolle J. Carter, Mission to Yenan: American Liaison with the Chinese Communists 1944–1947 (Lexington: University of Kentucky Press, 1997).
- E. J. Kahn, The China Hands: America's Foreign Service Officers and What Befell Them (New York: Viking Press, 1972, 1975).
- William P. Head, Yenan!: Colonel Wilbur Peterkin and the American Military Mission to the Chinese Communist, 1944–1945 (Chapel Hill, N.C.: Documentary Publications, 1987).
- Charles F. Romanus and Riley Sunderland, United States Army in World War II, China-Burma-India Theater: Stilwell's mission to China (Washington, D.C.: Department of the Army, 1953).
- --------, United States Army in World War II, China-Burma-India Theater: Stilwell's Command Problems (Washington, D.C.: Department of the Army, 1956).
- --------, United States Army in World War II, China-Burma-India Theater: Time Runs Out in CBI (Washington, D.C.: Department of the Army, 1959).
- Kenneth E. Shewmaker, Americans and Chinese Communists, 1927–1945: A Persuading Encounter- (Ithaca: Cornell University Press, 1971).
- Tsou Tang, America's Failure in China, 1941–50 (Chicago: University of Chicago Press, Reissued in 2 pb. vols., 1975., 1963).
