= China White Paper =

1949 U.S. Department of State publication

United States Relations with China with Special Reference to the Period 1944–1949
- Author: U.S. Department of State
- Language: English
- Series: Department of State Publication 3573; Far Eastern Series 30
- Subject: China–United States relations, Chinese Civil War, foreign policy
- Genre: White paper, diplomatic history, government report
- Publisher: U.S. Government Printing Office
- Publication date: August 5, 1949
- Publication place: United States
- Media type: Print (hardcover and paperback)
- Pages: 1054
- OCLC: 1855217

The China White Paper is the common name for United States Relations with China, with Special Reference to the Period 1944—1949, published in August 1949 by the United States Department of State in response to public concern about the impending victory of Chinese Communist forces in the Chinese Civil War. Secretary of State Dean Acheson directed his staff to prepare it in order to answer critics of American policy who blamed the administration for the "Loss of China". The introduction by Acheson became controversial. Acheson wrote: "The unfortunate but inescapable fact is that the ominous result of the Civil War in China was beyond the control of the government of the United States. Nothing that this country did or could have done within the reasonable limits of its capabilities could have changed the result; nothing that was left undone by this country has contributed to it."

== Background ==
During the presidential campaign of 1948, as Cold War fears of communist global expansion mounted, critics of the Truman administration heatedly raised the question "Who Lost China?." Criticism mounted after Truman's surprising victory in the election as the Chinese Communist Party led by Mao Zedong steadily defeated Chinese Nationalist armies of Chiang Kai-shek and was winning the Chinese Civil War. In November 1948 John Paton Davies proposed a collection of documents to explain and defend American policy in China to the American public, an idea that Secretary of State Dean Acheson ordered his staff to prepare. The group was headed by the Director of the Far Eastern Division, Walton Butterworth but much of the work was done by Charles W. Yost, John F. Melby who had served for the State Department in the Soviet Union and China during the war, and by Philip Jessup. The 1054 page volume was published August 1949, as Mao and his retinue were about to enter Beijing.

== Content ==
The document consisted of 412 pages of narrative covering relations from 1944 to 1949, and 642 pages of documents as an appendix. It was based entirely on documents from the State Department files. Chapters covered American policy, 1844–1943; Nationalist-Communist relations, 1921–1944; the Ambassadorship of Major General Patrick J. Hurley, 1944-1945 and his efforts at mediation; the Yalta Agreement and the Sino-Soviet Treaty of 1945; the Mission of General George C. Marshall, 1945–47; including the development of the Civil War; the Ambassadorship of John Leighton Stuart, 1947–1949; including further developments in the Civil War; the military picture, 1945–49; American economic aid, 1947–49. A set of annexes includes 186 treaties, official statements, and other documents.

The body of the volume was preceded by a "Letter of Transmittal," signed though not written by Secretary of State Dean Acheson. The letter described origin and nature of the White Paper and defended American policy, 1944–1949. The Letter opens by saying

Despite the distance and broad differences in background which separate China and the United States, our friendship for that country has always been intensified by the religious, philanthropic and cultural ties which have united the two peoples...

The letter went on that "the religious, philanthropic and cultural ties which have united the two peoples, and has been attested by many acts of good will over a period of many years, including the use of the Boxer indemnity for the education of Chinese students, the abolition of extraterritoriality during the Second World War, and our extensive aid to China during and since the close of the war," and that the United States maintained the doctrine of the Open Door, such as respect for the administrative and territorial integrity of China, opposition to any foreign domination of China. The Letter advised that the Chinese people "should be given time to develop those political institutions which would best meet their needs in the modern world". The "causes" of China's revolution were "unbearable pressure upon the land" and the "impact of the West."

Acheson wrote that the Chiang's Nationalist government had lost the confidence of its own troops and the Chinese people, and that as a result its defeat in the Chinese Civil War was therefore something that the United States could not have prevented. The letter continued that the Communists had "foresworn their Chinese heritage" and "publicly announced their subservience" to Russia (the Soviet Union). This rhetoric may well have been calculated to shame the new leadership into relating, as behind the scenes Acheson realistically expected that the United States would "wait for the dust to settle," then extend diplomatic recognition to the new government. The white paper calculated that the Truman administration had provided $3 billion in aid to the Nationalist government during the Chinese Civil War.

== Reaction ==
=== Domestic reaction ===
Congressional Republicans responded by criticizing the State Department as having been misleading regarding the nature of Mao and the communist movement. John Melby later recalled that the "purpose was to call off the dogs from the China Lobby" but did not work and "just accrued more fuel for the fire". He found it remarkable that "intelligent and experienced men in the department, people like Dean Acheson and so on, had so little realization of what a hot topic China was". Scholars generally agree. Hannah Gurman called the White Paper "disastrous", and Robert Newman explains that its "fatal flaw" was that it ran against the grain of the "rhetorical climate", which was "simply not hospitable to an argument that challenged America's virile self-image".

Many in the American public objected to the White Paper for placing blame on Chiang and the Nationalist government. The nationally syndicated Washington, D.C. columnist Joseph Alsop, who had served in China during the war, wrote that "If you have kicked a drowning friend briskly in the face as he sank for the second and third times, you cannot later explain that he was doomed anyway because he was such a bad swimmer".

=== Chinese reaction ===
The white paper outraged Mao Zedong, who wrote a number of articles responding to the report. "Acheson is telling a bare-faced lie when he describes aggression as "friendship". To the contrary, he wrote, all the "friendship" shown to China by U.S. imperialism since 1840 when the United States collaborated with Britain in the Opium War, and especially the great act of "friendship" in helping Chiang Kai-shek "slaughter" several million Chinese in the last few years..."

Mao asked why Truman would provide so much support to Nationalist forces if he believed them to be so "demoralized and unpopular." Mao stated that since Truman's position of supporting a demoralized and unpopular Nationalist government was otherwise irrational, Truman must have been acting out of imperialist ambitions "to slaughter the Chinese people" by needlessly prolonging the war. Mao spurned the White Paper's explanation of the revolution in terms of over-population and the stimulus of Western ideas, since in later passages "even this bit of tedious and phoney theory of causation disappears, and one finds only a mass of inexplicable events". Mao's sarcasm accuses Acheson of not understanding the revolution:

Quite unaccountably, the Chinese fought among themselves for power and money, suspecting and hating each other. An inexplicable change took place in the relative moral strength of the two contending parties, the Kuomintang and the Communist Party; the morale of one party dropped sharply to below zero, while that of the other rose sharply to white heat. What was the reason? Nobody knows. Such is the logic inherent in the "high order of culture" of the United States as represented by Dean Acheson.
