= John S. Service =

World War II era American diplomat to China (1909–1999)

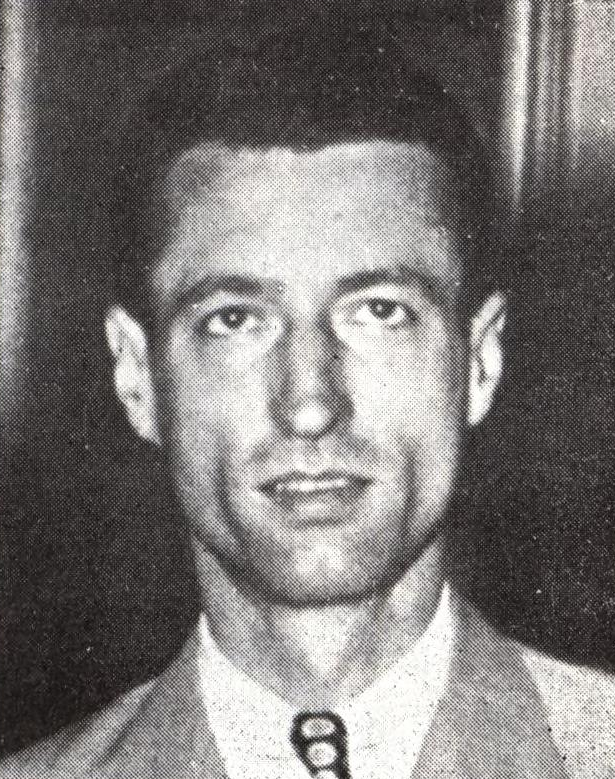
- Service c. 1945
- Born: John Stewart Service; August 3, 1909; Chengdu, Sichuan, Qing China
- Died: February 3, 1999 (aged 89); Oakland, California, U.S.
- Occupation: Foreign Service
- Known for: China Hands
- Parents: Robert Roy Service (father); Grace Service (née Boggs) (mother)

John Stewart Service (August 3, 1909 – February 3, 1999) was an American diplomat who served in the Foreign Service in China prior to and during World War II. Considered one of the State Department's "China Hands," he was an important member of the Dixie Mission to Yan'an. Service correctly predicted that the Communists would defeat the Nationalists in a civil war. He and other diplomats were blamed for the "loss" of China in the domestic political turmoil after the 1949 Communist triumph in China. In June 1945, Service was arrested in the Amerasia Affair in 1945. The prosecution sought an indictment for espionage, but a federal grand jury unanimously declined to indict him.

In 1950 U.S. Senator Joseph McCarthy launched an attack against Service, which led to investigations of the reports that Service had written while he was stationed in China. Numerous loyalty boards cleared Service, but a final one suggested there was "reasonable doubt" as to his loyalty. That opinion forced Secretary of State Dean Acheson to fire Service. In 1957, the U.S. Supreme Court ordered his reinstatement in a unanimous decision and found that Acheson's action had been illegal because "it violated Regulations of the Department of State which were binding on the Secretary."

== Early life ==
John Service was born on August 3, 1909, in the city of Chengdu in the Sichuan Province of China, the son of Grace Josephine (Boggs) and Robert Roy Service, missionaries to Sichuan working for the YMCA. Service spent his childhood in Sichuan Province. By the age of eleven, Service had mastered the local Chinese dialect, and then attended the Shanghai American School for high school. The Service family moved to California, where John graduated from Berkeley High School in Berkeley, California at the age of fifteen. Those who knew him say that he always went by "Jack" and that he never used his middle name.

In the fall of 1927, Service entered Oberlin College. He majored in both art history and economics and was captain of the school's cross-country and track and field teams. After graduation, he took and passed the Foreign Service Exam in 1933. In 1977, Oberlin awarded him an honorary degree.

== Career in China ==
Service was first assigned to a clerkship position in the American consulate in the capital of Yunnan province, Kunming. Two years later, Service was promoted to Foreign Service Officer and sent to Beijing for language study. In 1938, he was assigned to the Shanghai Consulate General under Clarence E. Gauss. When Gauss was promoted to ambassador, he made Service Third Secretary of the American Embassy at Chungking. As time progressed, Service was promoted to Second Secretary.

During the early war years, Service wrote increasingly-critical reports on the Kuomintang, led by Chiang Kai-shek. Service characterized the Nationalist government as "fascist," "undemocratic," and "feudal." His reports caught the attention of John P. Davies, a Foreign Service Officer working as a diplomatic attaché to General Joseph Stilwell. In the summer of 1943, Davies arranged to have Service and two others assigned to him as assistants.

=== Dixie Mission and Yan'an ===
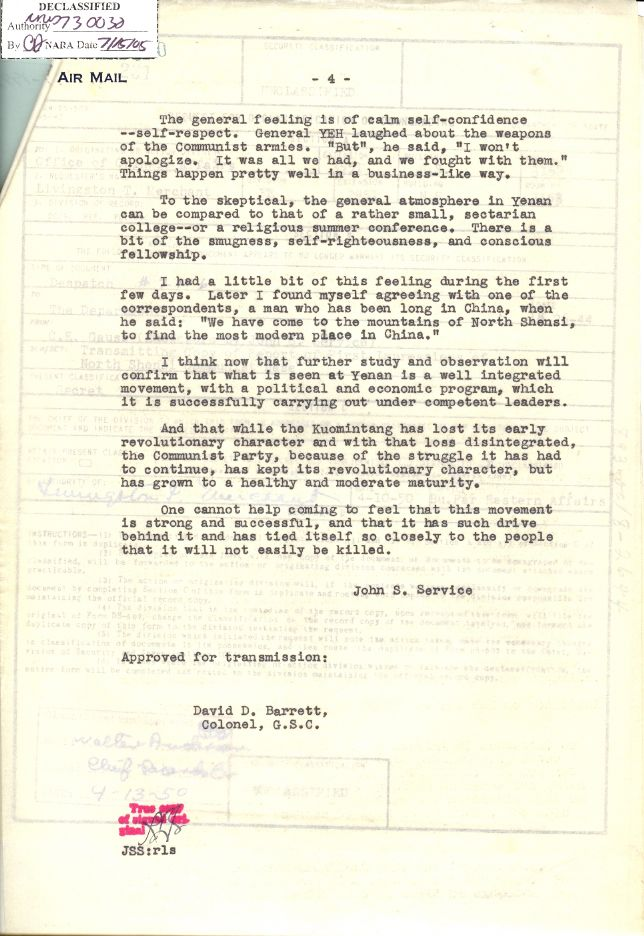
Last Page from Service's First Report from Yan'an. Page One, Two and Three here.

Because the invasion of Japan was planned to launch from China, there was great interest in enlisting support from all Chinese factions. The US Army Observation Group, also known as the Dixie Mission, was formed to travel the headquarters of the Chinese Communist Party in Yan'an and to establish contact with the Communists as a power in North China. Davies selected Service to represent the State Department, the first to visit the Communist headquarters.

Service arrived in Yan'an on July 22, 1944. There Service met and interviewed top leaders of the Communists like Mao Zedong and Zhou Enlai. Service wrote a series of reports over the next four months that praised Mao and the Chinese Communist Party, and described its leaders as "progressive" and "democratic." He wrote, "The Communists are in China to stay and China's destiny is not Chiang's but theirs." He continued to write that the Nationalists under Chiang were corrupt and incompetent. Service and the other American political officers advocated a policy of relations with the Communists and the Nationalists. They believed a civil war was inevitable and that the Communists would triumph. If the US supported the CPC in a coalition with the nationalists, they felt that the US could steer the Communists out of the Soviet orbit to which the Communists might be pushed if they were antagonized.

The new US Ambassador to China, Patrick Hurley, also tried to bring unity between the Communists and the Nationalists. Hurley initially accepted a five-point plan that would have brought both into a power-sharing arrangement. Chiang rejected this plan and countered with a three-point plan that would leave the Communists with no real power in a government run by him and his supporters. Hurley came to support Chiang's view exclusively and rejected the recommendations of Service and the other Foreign Service officers to accept the Communists' growing power and to accommodate it. Hurley had Service and the rest of the political officers recalled from China and blamed them for US diplomatic failures in China.

== Later career ==
Service returned to Washington in 1945 and was soon arrested as a suspect in the Amerasia Case. He was accused of passing confidential US materials from his time in China to the editors of the Amerasia magazine. However, a grand jury declined to indict Service and found that the materials were not sensitive and were of a kind commonly released to journalists. Five years later, he was dismissed from the State Department after Joseph McCarthy accused him of being a communist. Service challenged the dismissal in court. Ultimately, the US Supreme Court ruled in his favor, and he was reinstated at the State Department. In between his initial legal success in the Amerasia matter in 1945 and his dismissal in 1950, Service had three overseas assignments. He was briefly posted to Douglas MacArthur's staff in Tokyo. He served in New Zealand from October 1946 to early 1949. Finally, he was assigned to India, but he never made it to the post with his family. In March 1950, he was ordered from his ship docked in Yokohama to return to Washington, DC, where he would answer charges leveled against him.

=== Disloyalty charges ===
FBI surveillance recorded that Service met with Amerasia editor Philip Jaffe on April 19, 1945 at the Statler Hotel: "Service, according to the microphone surveillance, apparently gave Jaffe a document which dealt with matters the Chinese had furnished to the United States government in confidence." In China, Service had established a reputation for meeting with Communists, reporters, and anyone who might provide information for his duty. Former ambassador to China, Clarence Gauss testified later during the McCarthy era:

In Chungking, Mr. Service was a political officer of the Embassy.... His job was to get every bit of information that he possibly could... he would see the foreign press people. He saw the Chinese press people. He saw anybody in any of the embassies or legations that were over there that were supposed to know anything.... He went to the Kuomintang headquarters... he went to the Communist headquarters. He associated with everybody and anybody in Chungking that could give him information, and he pieced together this puzzle that we had constantly before us as to what was going on in China and he did a magnificent job at it.

Service had numerous meetings with Jaffe. Adrian Fisher, who was the senior legal officer at the State Department, later commented, "It was like a scene out of Heaven's My Destination. Jack Service went into a bawdy house thinking it was still a girls' boarding school."

Eventually, FBI investigators broke into the offices of Amerasia, and found hundreds of government documents, many labeled "secret," "top secret," or "confidential." Service was arrested as a suspect. FBI Director J. Edgar Hoover wrote that he thought he had an "airtight case" against Service. However, when the Justice Department submitted its evidence to a federal grand jury, they elected to indict Jaffe but, by a vote of 20–0, refused to indict Service.

Service was subject to loyalty and security hearings every year from 1946 to 1951, with the exception of 1948. In each hearing, he was cleared of disloyalty or other wrongdoing. Charles Yost was one of the State Department officials and friends who testified on Service's behalf.

Five years after Amerasia, on March 14, Senator Joseph McCarthy accused Service of being a Communist sympathizer in the State Department. Service was cleared of the charges by the Senate Foreign Relations Subcommittee on the Investigation of Loyalty of State Department Employees, also known as the Tydings Committee. However, a final review board found "reasonable doubt" as to Service's loyalty, and Secretary of State Dean Acheson ordered his dismissal. In the "Red Scare" turmoil of the early 1950s, John P. Davies, and other diplomats were blamed for the fall of China to the Communists and were forced out of the State Department.

Beginning in 1952, Service appealed his dismissal from the State Department. Service was eventually hired by Sarco International, a steam trap company. In 1955, Clement Wells, the owner who had hired Service, appointed him president of the company. Meanwhile, Service's case eventually came to the Supreme Court, which ruled in his favor unanimously. The Court held that Service's dismissal had violated State Department procedures because its Loyalty Security Board found no evidence of Service being disloyal or a security risk.

In The Amerasia Spy Case: Prelude to McCarthyism, the authors Harvey Klehr and Ronald Radosh state, "Any lingering doubts about Service's true position are erased by the evidence of the FBI surveillance. If he had been a secret Communist, much less a spy, some better evidence would likely have surfaced in the transcripts."

Jonathan Mirsky, in his review in the Wall Street Journal of the 2009 biography of Service by Lynne Joiner states, "In two phone interviews with me shortly before he died a decade ago, Service admitted that in the 1940s he had given Jaffe a top-secret document revealing the Nationalist Order of Battle, which showed the exact disposition of the forces facing Mao's troops." Mirsky observed to Service that some people might consider that treason, and Service replied that he knew that. Service also stated, "I want to get this off my chest" and "I was gullible, and trusting, and foolish." Service also said he had purposely ignored Mao's persecutions and executions of his perceived enemies in the Yan'an period. He gave his reason. "I wanted them to win. I thought they were better than the Nationalists and that if we always opposed them we would have no access to the next Chinese government."

Lynne Joiner, the biographer, responded to these allegations in a letter to the editor: "I conducted extensive interviews with Service during the last year of his life and he never mentioned this to me or to others who knew him well." Joiner added, "Service was never able to see the evidence being used against him during his lifetime—and so it continues a decade after his death."

=== Return to State Department ===
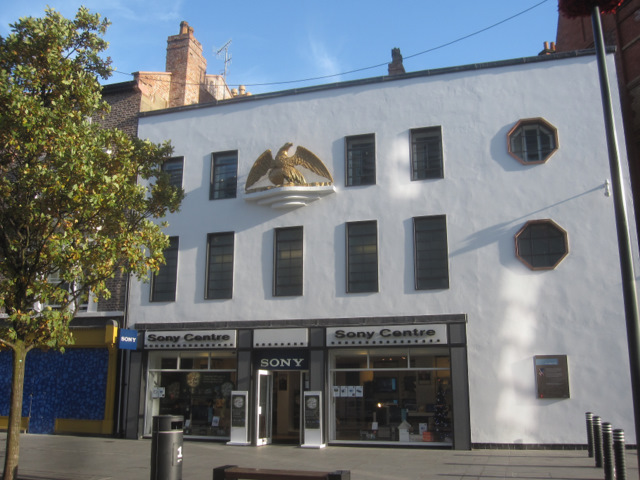
Consulate of the United States in Liverpool, one of Service's last posts.

Service returned to active duty in the State Department in 1957. Firstly, he was assigned to its transportation division. In 1959, he was given a security clearance after a new internal hearing. Undersecretary of State for Administration Loy Henderson approved the clearance, but noted that Service's "action in the Amerasia case was reprehensible and has brought serious discredit upon the Foreign Service..,." Henderson's qualified approval allowed Service to continue his career, but prevented him from ever being promoted again. To avoid a Senate fight over a Service confirmation, the State Department decided to assign Service to head the consulate in Liverpool "but without the associated title or pay grade."

Though Service continued to get excellent performance reviews in every position that he held, the State Department refused to promote him. He retired in 1962 and pursued a Master of Arts degree in political science at the University of California, Berkeley. After earning his degree, Service worked as library curator for the school's Center for Chinese Studies into the 1970s, and then served as editor for the center's publications.

In 1971, preceding President Richard Nixon's visit to China, Service was one of a handful of Americans invited back to the country, as relations with the US were normalized. He met with Zhou Enlai again during his visit, and he and his wife, Caroline, appeared on the cover of Parade Magazine.

== Death ==
On February 3, 1999, John Stewart Service died in Oakland, California.

== Legacy ==
The two main themes of Service's reporting were the Nationalists were incompetent and likely to lose in a power struggle with the Communists, and the Communists seemed to be worthy successors with whom the US should try to establish relations. Prior to the outbreak of the Chinese Civil War in 1946, Service had predicted that the Communists would prevail because of their ability to stamp out corruption, gain popular support, and organize grassroots organizations. The scenarios that Service envisioned in his reports from Dixie Mission about the Communists' future management of China were rose–colored or incomplete. Mao's implementation of his economic plans was harsh and undemocratic. Service hoped that the Communists would adopt free market and democratic reforms if they were pushed in the right direction with US support. Later, Service wrote that he believed an American relationship with the Communists might have prevented the Korean War and Vietnam War or lessened their gravity.

In 1973, historian Barbara Tuchman paid tribute to Jack Service's career in a talk to the Foreign Service Association that was later published in the Foreign Service Bulletin. Tuchman forecast that the "inflexible verdict of history" would be that if American policy makers had heeded Service's advice in the 1940s both Asia and America could have been spared "immeasurable, and to some degree irreparable, harm."

The story of the Dixie Mission was the basis for a World War II novel, Two Sons of China (Bondfire Book, 2013) by Andrew Lam, in which Service is a prominent figure.

== Sources ==
- Joiner, Lynne (2009). Honorable Survivor: Mao's China, McCarthy's America, and the Persecution of John S. Service. Naval Institute Press. ISBN 978-1-59114-423-6.
- Service, John S. (1974). Lost Chance in China: The World War II: Despatches of John S. Service. Random House. ISBN 0-394-48436-3.
- Radosh, Ronald, and Klehr, Harvey (1996). The Amerasia Spy Case: Prelude to McCarthyism. University of North Carolina Press. ISBN 0-8078-2245-0.
- Service, John S. (1971). The Amerasia Papers: Some Problems in the History of US-China Relations. Center for Chinese Studies, University of California.
- Kahn, E.J. (1975). The China Hands : America's Foreign Service Officers and What Befell Them. Penguin Books. ISBN 0-14-004301-2.
- Buckley, William F. (1954). McCarthy and His Enemies: The Record and Its Meaning. Regnery Publishing. ISBN 0-89526-472-2.
- Evans, M. Stanton (2007). Blacklisted by History: The Untold Story of Senator Joe McCarthy and His Fight Against America's Enemies. Crown Publishing Group. ISBN 978-1-4000-8105-9.
- Evans, M. Stanton; Romerstein, Herbert (2013). Stalin's Secret Agents: The Subversion of Roosevelt's Government. Threshold Editions. ISBN 978-1-4391-4770-2.
