= 1955 in North Vietnam =

- Decades: 1950s; 1960s; 1970s
- See also: Other events of 1955; Timeline of Vietnamese history

The following lists events that happened during 1955 in North Vietnam.

== Events ==
=== November ===
- November 1 - The Vietnam War begins between the South Vietnam Army and the North Vietnam Army in which the latter is allied with the Viet Cong. However, due to the war's complexity and the various actors involved, there is no clear consensus on its exact starting date.
  - The American Military Assistance Advisory Group (MAAG) for South Vietnam was created. Due to the creation of the MAAG for Vietnam on this date, in 1998 after a high level review by the Department of Defense (DoD) and through the efforts of Richard B. Fitzgibbon's family, November 1, 1955, became the earliest qualifying date for inclusion of American combat deaths on the wall of the Vietnam Veterans Memorial.

== See also ==
- 1955 in the Vietnam War
