= 1955 in South Vietnam =

- Decades: 1950s; 1960s; 1970s
- See also: Other events of 1955; Timeline of Vietnamese history

The following lists events that happened during 1955 in South Vietnam.

== Events ==
=== February ===
- February 12 - United States President Dwight D. Eisenhower sends the first U.S. advisors to South Vietnam.

=== October ===
- October 26 - Ngô Đình Diệm proclaims Vietnam to be a republic with himself as its President (following the State of Vietnam referendum on October 23) and forms the Army of the Republic of Vietnam.

=== November ===
- November 1 - The Vietnam War begins between the South Vietnam Army and the North Vietnam Army in which the latter is allied with the Viet Cong.
