= Albert Coady Wedemeyer =

United States Army general (1896–1989)

Albert C. Wedemeyer
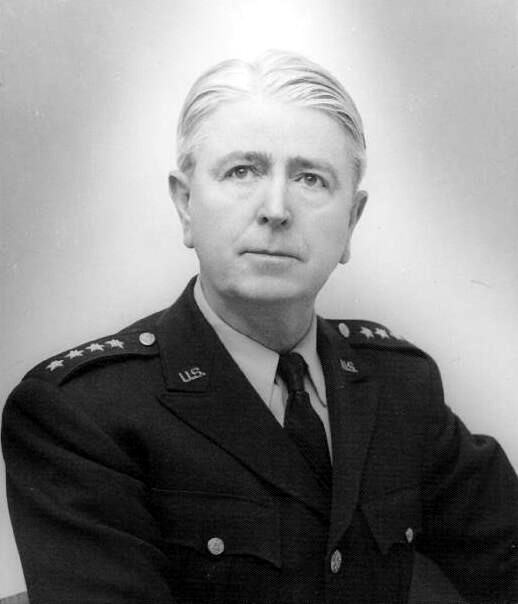
- Wedemeyer in 1954
- Born: July 9, 1896; Omaha, Nebraska, U.S.
- Died: December 17, 1989 (aged 93); Fort Belvoir, Virginia, U.S.
- Burial place: Arlington National Cemetery
- Military career
- Allegiance: United States
- Branch: United States Army
- Service years: 1918–1951
- Rank: General
- Service number: 0-12484
- Commands: Sixth United States Army
- Conflicts: World War II; Pacific War; Chinese Civil War; Operation Beleaguer
- Awards: Army Distinguished Service Medal (3); Legion of Merit; Presidential Medal of Freedom; Order of Blue Sky and White Sun (China)
- Other work: Author

Albert Coady Wedemeyer (9 July 1896 – 19 December 1989) was a United States Army general who served in Asia during World War II from October 1943 to the end of the war in 1945. Previously, he was an important member of the War Planning Board which formulated plans for the invasion of Normandy. He was General George C. Marshall's chief consultant when in the spring of 1942 he traveled to London with General Marshall and a small group of American military men to consult with the British in an effort to convince the British to support the cross channel invasion. Wedemeyer was a staunch anti-communist. While in China during the years 1944 to 1945 he was Chiang Kai-shek's Chief of Staff and commanded all American forces in China. Wedemeyer supported Chiang's struggle against Mao Zedong and in 1947 President Truman sent him back to China to render a report on what actions the United States should take. During the Cold War, Wedemeyer was a chief supporter of the Berlin Airlift.

== Early life ==
Wedemeyer was born on 9 July 1896, in Omaha, Nebraska, and was a graduate of the Creighton Preparatory School.

== Prewar career ==
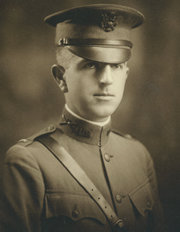
Albert C. Wedemeyer as a newly commissioned second lieutenant, pictured here sometime in the early 1920s

In 1919, he graduated from the United States Military Academy (USMA) at West Point, New York. On his first assignment, at Fort Benning, Georgia, he became uncharacteristically drunk; a court-martial gave him six months of restrictions and reduced pay. By his own account, he was various grades of lieutenant for 17 years, before finally being promoted to captain in 1935.

Between 1936 and 1938, Captain Wedemeyer was one of a handful of United States Army officers, including Herman F. Kramer, who attended the Kriegsakademie in Berlin. While there he received instruction in armored warfare from Heinz Guderian and in Geopolitik from Karl Haushofer. He also met senior Nazi Party leaders such as Hermann Göring and Martin Bormann. Soon after graduation from this school, he attended, as one of many international observers, the German Army grand maneuvers of 1938.

When he returned to Washington that year, Wedemeyer analyzed Nazi Germany's grand strategy and dissected German thinking. Wedemeyer thus became the United States military's foremost authority on German tactical operations, whose "most ardent student" was George C. Marshall. Wedemeyer was greatly influenced and his career aided by his father-in-law, Lieutenant General Stanley Dunbar Embick, the Deputy Chief of Staff and Director of the War Plans Division of the United States War Department.

== World War II ==
At the outbreak of World War II, Wedemeyer was a lieutenant colonel assigned as a staff officer to the War Plans Division. Notably, in 1941 he was the chief author of the "Victory Program", which advocated the defeat of Germany's Wehrmacht in Europe as the prime war objective for the United States. This plan was adopted and expanded as the war progressed. Additionally, Wedemeyer helped to plan the Normandy Invasion.

=== China-Burma-India Command ===
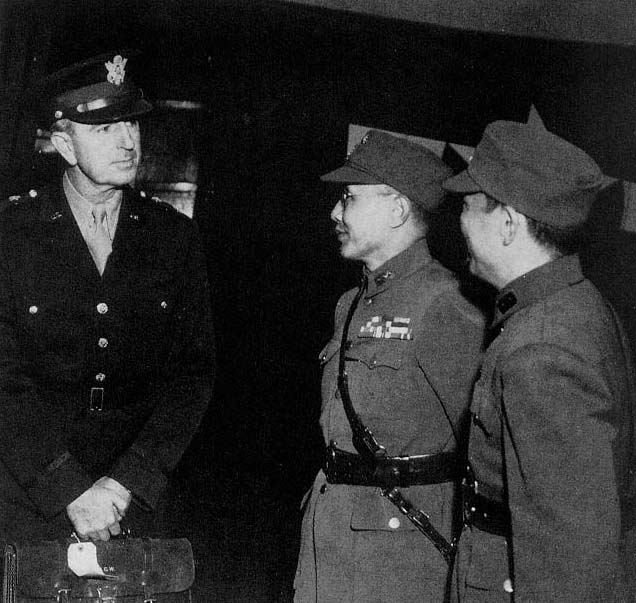
General Wedemeyer arriving in Chungking, 1944

In 1943, Wedemeyer was reassigned to the South-East Asia Theatre to be Chief of Staff to the Supreme Allied Commander of the South East Asia Command (SEAC), Lord Louis Mountbatten.

On 27 October 1944, Wedemeyer received a telegram from General George C. Marshall directing him to proceed to China to assume command of United States Forces, China Theater (USF CT) replacing General Joseph Stilwell. In his new command, Wedemeyer was also named Chief of Staff to the Generalissimo Chiang Kai-shek. The telegram contained a host of special instructions and limitations on Wedemeyer's command when dealing with the Nationalist government. Wedemeyer later recalled his initial dread over the assignment, as service in the China theater was considered a graveyard for American officials, both military and diplomatic. When Wedemeyer arrived at Stilwell's headquarters after Stilwell's dismissal, he was dismayed to discover that Stilwell had intentionally departed without seeing him, and did not leave a single briefing paper for his guidance, though departing United States military commanders habitually greeted their replacement in order to thoroughly brief them on the strengths and weaknesses of headquarters staff, the issues confronting the command, and planned operations. Searching the offices, Wedemeyer could find no documentary record of Stilwell's plans or records of his former or future operations. Wedemeyer then spoke with Stilwell's staff officers but learned little from them because Stilwell, according to the staff, kept everything in his "hip pocket".

In accordance with these instructions, Wedemeyer took command of USF CT on 31 October 1944.

During his time in China, Wedemeyer attempted to motivate the Nationalist Chinese government to take a more aggressive role against the Imperial Japanese Armed Forces in the war. He was instrumental in expanding the Hump airlift operation with additional, more capable transport aircraft, and continued Stilwell's programs to train, equip, and modernize the National Revolutionary Army. His efforts were not wholly successful, in part because of the ill will engendered by his predecessor, as well as continuing friction over the role of the Chinese Communist Party's People's Liberation Army. Wedemyer was credited for his advice in helping the NRA to defeat the Japanese forces in the Battle of West Hunan, as well as retaking Guilin and Liuzhou. Wedemeyer also supervised logistical support for the United States Army Air Forces in China. These forces included the United States Twentieth Air Force partaking in Operation Matterhorn and the Fourteenth Air Force operated by General Claire Chennault.

On 7 December 1945, Wedemeyer with General Douglas MacArthur, and navy Admiral Raymond A. Spruance, the three top military officers in the Far East, recommended to the Pentagon that it transport six more Chinese Nationalist armies into North China and Manchuria. However they also suggested that "the U.S. assistance to China, as outlined above, be made available as basis for negotiation by the American Ambassador to bring together and effect a compromise between the major opposing groups in order to promote a united and democratic China."

The issue of forcing the Nationalists into a coalition government with the Communists would later become a central issue in the fierce "Who lost China" political debates in the United States during 1949–51. On 10 July 1945, Wedemeyer had informed General Marshall:

If Uncle Sugar, Russia, and Britain united strongly in their endeavor to bring about a coalition of these two political parties [the Kuomintang and the Chinese Communist Party] in China by coercing both sides to make realistic concessions, serious post-war disturbance may be averted and timely effective military employment of all Chinese may be obtained against the Japanese. I use the term coercion advisedly because it is my conviction that continued appeals to both sides couched in polite diplomatic terms will not accomplish unification. There must be teeth in Big Three.

Wedemeyer later said as a military commander, his statement was intended as a call to force the long-heralded, but never implemented, military alliance between the Nationalist government and Chinese Communists in order to rout undefeated Japanese forces in China. He later told others that he had opposed a political coalition. (Tsou, 1962).

After Japan's capitulation, Wedemeyer became alarmed that some Japanese troops were surrendering to Communist Chinese forces. He wanted seven American divisions to be sent to China, but General Marshall replied that it should not be given priority over Japan and Korea. Wedemeyer served in China into 1946.

== Postwar ==
After returning from China, Wedemeyer was promoted to Army Chief of Plans and Operations. In July 1947, President Harry S. Truman sent Wedemeyer to China and Korea to examine the "political, economic, psychological and military situations." The result was the Wedemeyer Report in which Wedemeyer stressed the need for intensive United States training of and assistance to the Nationalist armies.

Wedemeyer's 1947 report painted a picture of the Chinese Civil War that was both opportune and dire. Chiang's armies were far better-equipped than their Communist adversaries (who had not yet received weapons and training from the Soviets in Manchuria), and pushing them back on all fronts, but ammunition, fuel, and spare parts were severely lacking. These had been promised by Lend-Lease, but not delivered and still charged to Chiang's account. Thus, while the Nationalists had over 16,000 trucks virtually all of them were rendered inoperable, forcing his troops to march on foot. Ammunition shortages were also causing Nationalist divisions to lose battles, and Chiang's troops were forced to scavenge abandoned American dumps because no deliveries had been made. Even worse, much surplus weaponry and ammunition in the Pacific was being destroyed rather than utilized, and Chiang's government was charged exorbitant prices for what remained. For example, bazookas were sold to Greece at $3.65 apiece, while Chiang's government had to pay $162. For rifles, the price difference was $5.10 and $51, respectively. Ammunition cost differences were similar, China being charged $85 for 1000 rifle rounds and $95 for 1000 machine gun rounds, compared to $4.55 and $4.58 elsewhere. Wedemeyer recommended an immediate correction of these deficiencies and sending leftover equipment to China rather than blowing it up.

Lacking confidence in the Nationalist government caused by Joseph Stilwell and George Marshall's meddling, President Harry S. Truman not only rejected the recommendations in the report but also imposed an arms embargo against the Nationalist government, thereby intensifying the bitter political debate over the role of the United States in the Chinese Civil War. While Secretary of State George C. Marshall had hoped that Wedemeyer could convince Chiang Kai-shek to institute those military, economic, and political reforms that would create a Nationalist-Communist coalition, he supported Truman's view and suppressed publication of Wedemeyer's report, further provoking resentment by Nationalist and communist advocates both inside and outside the US government and the armed forces. The report was reprinted, however, in the 1949 China White Paper.

Following completion of the report, he assumed command of the Sixth United States Army in San Francisco, California; in this capacity, Wedemeyer "thought of himself as cut off from further military policy making."

After the fall of China to Communist forces, Wedemeyer would testify before Congress that while the loss of morale was indeed a cause of the defeat of the Nationalist Chinese forces, the Truman administration's 1947 decision to discontinue further training and modernizing of Nationalist forces, the US-imposed arms embargo, and constant anti-Nationalist sentiment expressed by Western journalists and policymakers were the primary causes of that loss of morale. In particular, Wedemeyer stressed that if the US had insisted on experienced American military advisers attached at the lower battalion and regimental levels of Nationalist armies, as it had done with Greek army forces during the Greek Civil War, the aid could have more efficiently been used. He also said that the immediate tactical assistance would have resulted in Nationalist armies performing far better in combat against the Communist Chinese.

Vice Admiral Oscar C. Badger, General Claire Chennault, and Brigadier General Francis Brink also testified that the arms embargo was a significant factor in the loss of China.

In 1948, Wedemeyer supported General Lucius D. Clay's plan to create an airbridge during the Berlin Crisis.

After the Communist victory in 1949, Wedemeyer became intimately associated with the China Lobby and openly voiced his criticism of those allegedly responsible for the Communist takeover of China. In 1951, after the outbreak of the Korean War, Senator Joseph R. McCarthy said that Wedemeyer had prepared a wise plan that would keep China a valued ally, which it had been sabotaged: "only in treason can we find why evil genius thwarted and frustrated it." The evil geniuses, McCarthy said, included Marshall.

Wedemeyer became a hero to United States anti-communists, and gave many lectures around the country. After retiring as a lieutenant general in 1951, he was promoted to full general by act of Congress on July 19, 1954.

Wedemeyer was a segregationist who subscribed to William Shockley's views on race and intelligence. In 1956, he was a delegate to a pro-segregationist conference where Chief Justice Earl Warren, who wrote the majority opinion for Brown v. Board of Education, was proclaimed an enemy of the United States. Speakers at the conference claimed that the country was facing a "Marxist-Zionist" takeover and equated desegregation to communism. In 1958, retired general George Van Horn Moseley wrote to Wedemeyer, complaining that President Eisenhower had refused to link Jewish Americans to the threat of world communism. Wedemeyer agreed, claiming that the United States would likely "be destroyed from within."

In 1957, Wedemeyer was affiliated with the National Investigations Committee On Aerial Phenomena. On May 23, 1985, he was presented with the Presidential Medal of Freedom by President Ronald Reagan.

In the 1970s, Wedemeyer became convinced that Jews controlled the media, were manipulating Americans, and controlling U.S. foreign policy. He and a colleague kept a list of senators who had "sold out" to the Israel lobby. Wedemeyer became convinced that the only way to break the grip of Jews and blacks on American society was to deport Jews to Russia and black people to Africa.

== Death and legacy ==
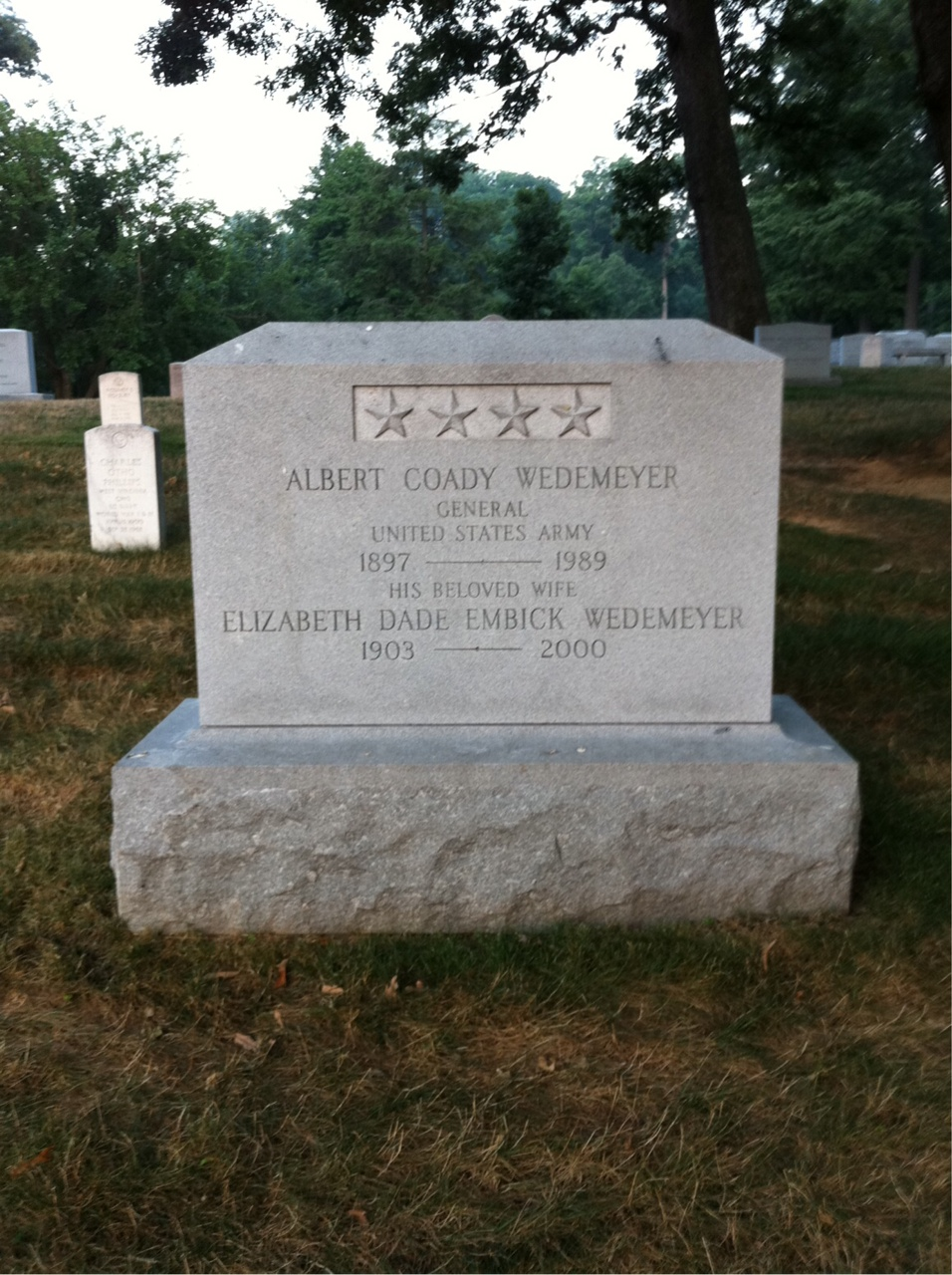
The grave of General Albert Coady Wedemeyer at Arlington National Cemetery

On 17 December 1989, Wedemeyer died at Fort Belvoir, Virginia. Wedemeyer and his wife Elizabeth Dade Embick (1903–2000) are buried in Arlington National Cemetery.

Friends Advice, in Boyds, Maryland, was his permanent home throughout his military career and until his death. It was listed on the National Register of Historic Places in 1992.

== Dates of rank ==
No insignia	Cadet, United States Military Academy: 14 June 1917
	Second Lieutenant, Regular Army: 1 November 1918
	First Lieutenant, Regular Army: 27 February 1920
	Second Lieutenant, Regular Army: 15 December 1922
	First Lieutenant, Regular Army: 24 June 1924
	Captain, Regular Army: 1 August 1935
	Major, Regular Army: 1 July 1940
	Lieutenant Colonel, Army of the United States: 15 September 1941
	Colonel, Army of the United States: 1 February 1942
	Brigadier General, Army of the United States: 7 July 1942
	Lieutenant Colonel, Regular Army: 11 December 1942
	Major General, Army of the United States: 20 September 1943
	Lieutenant General, Army of the United States: 1 January 1945
	Brigadier General, Regular Army: 6 April 1946
	Major General, Regular Army: 24 January 1948
	Lieutenant General, Retired list: 23 June 1951
	General, Regular Army, Retired List: 19 July 1954

== Sources ==
=== Primary sources ===
- Albert C. Wedemeyer, Wedemeyer Reports!, New York: Henry Holt & Co., 1958.
- Albert C. Wedemeyer, Wedemeyer on War and Peace. ed. by Keith E. Eiler, Hoover Inst. Press, 1987. 245 pp.
- General Albert C. Wedemeyer America's Unsung Strategist in World War II, by Dr. John J. McLaughlin. Casemate Publishing, 2012.

=== Secondary sources ===
- Herbert Feis, The China Tangle: The American Effort in China from Pearl Harbor to the Marshall Mission (Princeton: Princeton University Press, 1953).
- Romanus, Charles F. and Riley Sunderland, Time Runs Out in CBI (Washington, 1959), official U.S. Army history online edition
- Stueck, William. The Wedemeyer Mission: American Politics and Foreign Policy during the Cold War. U. of Georgia Press, 1984.
- Tang Tsou. America's Failure in China, 1941–50 (1963).
- Tang Tsou. "The Historians and the Generals", The Pacific Historical Review Vol. 31, No. 1 (February 1962), pp. 41–48. JSTOR 3636649.
- Keegan, John. Six Armies in Normandy: From D-Day to the Liberation Of Paris. Viking Penguin Inc 1982 (New 50th D-Day Anniversary 365 pp. edition includes a new introduction by the author) pp. 22, 31–34, 36–38
- Remarks at the Presentation Ceremony for the Presidential Medal of Freedom – May 23, 1985
- John McLaughlin, General Albert C. Wedemeyer: America's Unsung Strategist in World War II, Casemate, 2012.

Military offices
Preceded by Mark W. Clark	Commanding General Sixth Army; 1948–1951	Succeeded by Joseph M. Swing
