= Friends Advice =

Historic house in Maryland, United States

- U.S. National Register of Historic Places
- U.S. Historic district
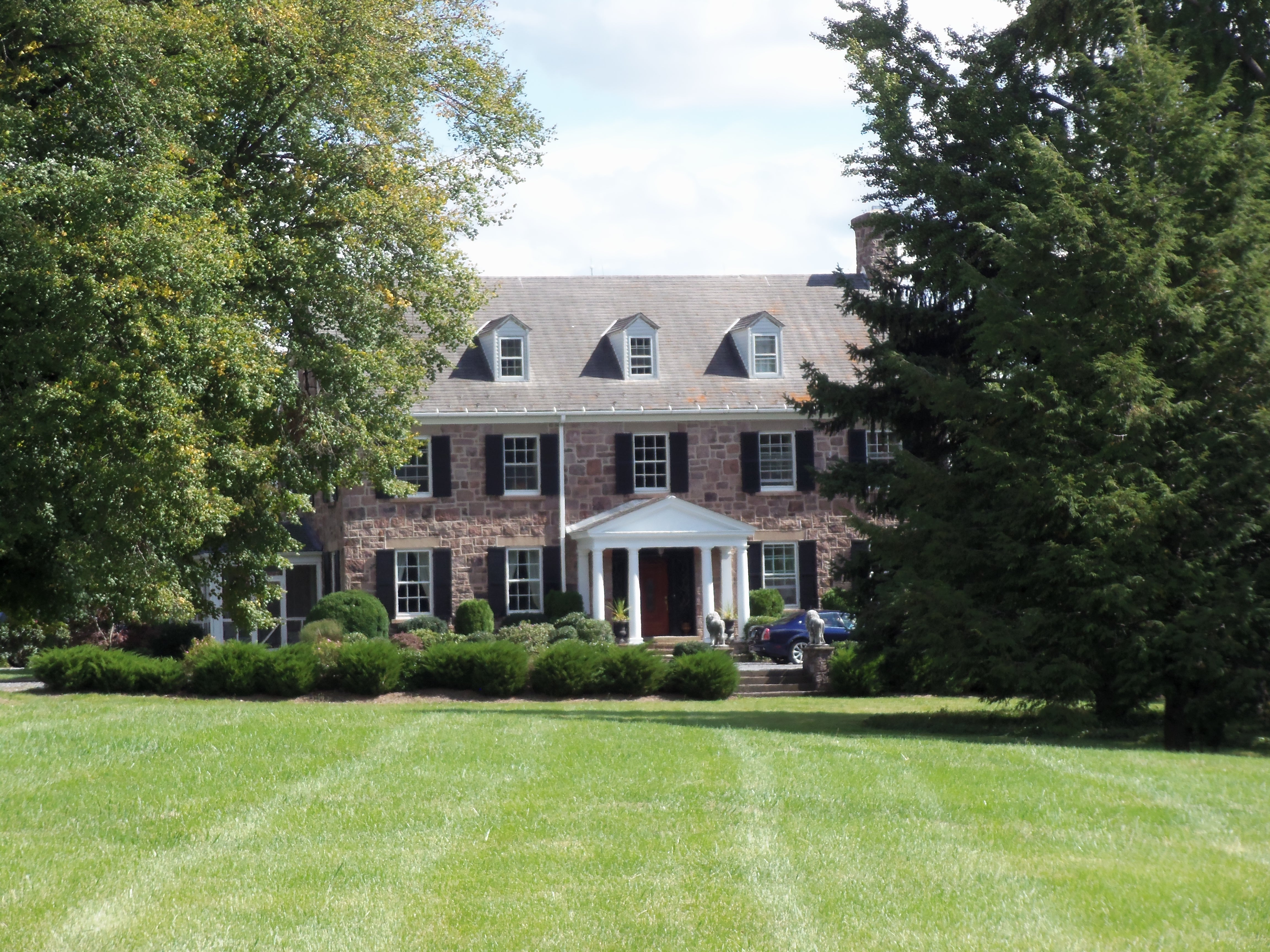
- Friends Advice, September 2012

- Location within Maryland Location within the United States
- Location: 19001 Bucklodge Rd., Boyds, Maryland
- Coordinates: 39°9′58″N 77°21′31″W
- Area: 38 acres (15 ha)
- Built: 1806
- Architect: Grigg, Milton
- Architectural style: Colonial Revival, Federal
- NRHP reference No.: 92001383
- Added to NRHP: October 28, 1992

Friends Advice is a historic home and national historic district located at Boyds, Montgomery County, Maryland, United States. It is an estate dominated by a main house of local sandstone in the impressive overall image of a Georgian plantation house. The earliest portion, the ca. 1806 Federal style block, sits on a stone foundation with a gable roof and gabled dormers. Later additions include a Colonial Revival-style block constructed in 1939–40; a Federal style block of the first quarter of the 19th century; and a frame block constructed in 1882 on the foundation of an 18th-century log structure. General Albert C. Wedemeyer (1897-1989) and his wife, whose family owned this property since the 18th century, used this estate as their permanent home throughout his military career and after his retirement in 1951, until his death in 1989.

Friends Advice was listed on the National Register of Historic Places in 1992.
