= 1954 in Vietnam =

- Decades: 1930s; 1940s; 1950s; 1960s; 1970s
- See also: Other events of 1954; Timeline of Vietnamese history

When 1954 began, the French had been fighting the insurgent communist-dominated Viet Minh for more than seven years attempting to retain control of their colony Vietnam. Domestic support for the war by the population of France had declined. The United States was concerned and worried that a French military defeat in Vietnam would result in the spread of communism to all the countries of Southeast Asia—the domino theory—and was looking for means of aiding the French without committing American troops to the war.

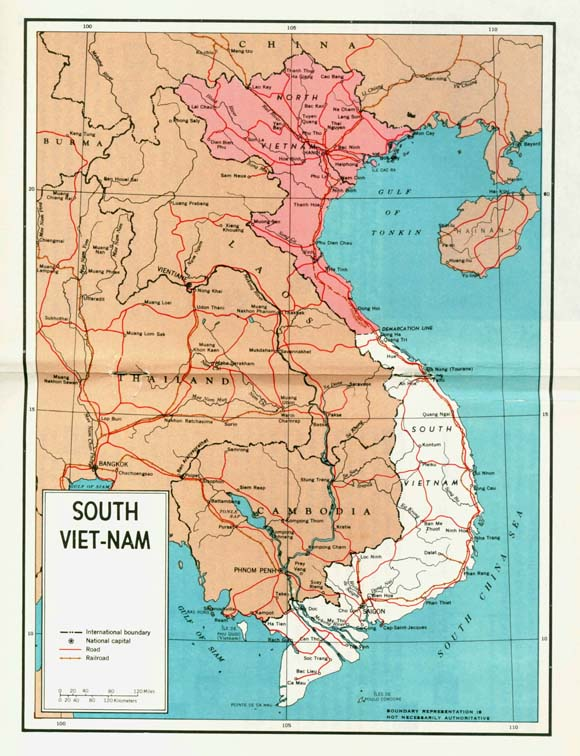
A map of North and South Vietnam after the Geneva Accords of 1954.

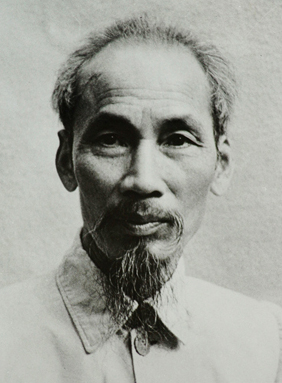
Ho Chi Minh, President of North Vietnam.

In a last ditch effort to defeat the Viet Minh, the French had fortified a remote outpost in northwestern Vietnam named Điện Biên Phủ with the objective of inducing the Viet Minh to attack and then utilizing superior French firepower to destroy the attackers. Viet Minh General Võ Nguyên Giáp described the French positions in a river valley as being at the bottom of a rice bowl with the Viet Minh holding the high ground surrounding the French.

In May, French military forces surrendered to the Viet Minh concluding the Battle of Dien Bien Phu. In July, a cease fire agreement was reached by the Geneva Accords dividing Vietnam into two provisional states at the 17th parallel of latitude. Ngô Đình Diệm became Prime Minister of South Vietnam and Ho Chi Minh became President of North Vietnam. Diệm overcame an early challenge to his rule from army leaders and the Hòa Hảo and Cao Đài religious sects. The United States pledged its support to the Diệm government and began to replace France as the principal foreign power involved in South Vietnam. China and the Soviet Union began to provide economic assistance to North Vietnam.

== January ==
12 January

Emperor and Chief of State Bảo Đại appointed Bửu Lộc as Prime Minister of Vietnam.

29 January

United States President Dwight D. Eisenhower announced that 26 B-26 bombers and 200 U.S. Air Force mechanics would be provided the French to aid them in their war against the Viet Minh.

== February ==
18 February

The United States, United Kingdom, France, and the Soviet Union agreed to discuss a solution to the war in Indochina at a Geneva Conference scheduled to begin on 26 April.

== March ==
The flag of the Viet Minh.

13 March

The Battle of Dien Bien Phu began. The French garrison was surrounded by the Viet Minh commanded by Võ Nguyên Giáp. During the nearly two-month course of the siege a total of about 20,000 soldiers in the French army defended themselves against 49,500 Viet Minh fighters.

15 March

The National Security Council of the United States approved the assignment of CIA operative Col. Edward Lansdale to Saigon. Lansdale was given much credit for advising Philippine President Ramon Magsaysay and helping defeat the Hukbalahap Rebellion.

25 March

President Eisenhower met with the National Security Council to consider U.S. intervention to assist the French at Dien Binh Phu. Eisenhower imposed four conditions for U.S. intervention: France would have to request U.S. intervention; the United Nations would have to approve; intervention would have to be a multi-national effort; and Congress would have to approve.

A U.S. Army study concluded that the use of nuclear weapons by the U.S. to relieve the siege of Điện Biên Phủ was feasible and suggested an operational plan. The study met with opposition from senior military officers and was quickly abandoned.

== April ==
3 April

President Eisenhower met with eight Congressional leaders, including Lyndon Johnson, to discuss Operation Vulture, a proposal to aid the French trapped in Dien Bien Phu with carrier-based air strikes. The members of Congress said they would support air strikes only if it were part of a multinational effort.

5 April

The National Security Council met again to consider U.S. intervention at Điện Biên Phủ. The Army, including Army Chief of Staff General Matthew Ridgway, was negative, stating that U.S. intervention would require 7 army divisions and heavy air support.

7 April

President Eisenhower used the phrase "falling dominoes" in a press conference. This was the origin of the domino theory which postulated that if Vietnam became communist the other nearby states would soon follow. The domino theory was a prominent justification for the Vietnam War in the United States during the 1960s.

14 April

Secretary of State John Foster Dulles returned to the United States after having failed to persuade France and the United Kingdom to support a multinational effort to assist the French in Điện Biên Phủ. The French wanted American air strikes, but opposed a multinational coalition; the British preferred to rely on the upcoming Geneva Convention to resolve the problem of the war in Vietnam.

17 April

Vice President of the U.S. Richard M. Nixon said at a press conference: "the United States as a leader of the free world cannot afford further retreat from Asia...If the French withdrew [from Vietnam], the United States might have to take the risk now by putting our own boys in."

22 April French Foreign Minister Georges Bidault told Dulles that only massive U.S. air strikes could save Điện Biên Phủ and withdrew French objections to a multinational effort. Winston Churchill in Great Britain, however, said he 'was not prepared to give any undertakings about United Kingdom military action in Indochina in advance of the results of Geneva."

26 April

The Geneva Conference (1954) on Korea and Vietnam began.

== May ==
6 May

Two American pilots, James B. McGovern Jr. and Wallace Buford, were killed when their cargo plane, attempting to airdrop supplies into Dien Bien Phu, was shot down. They were employed by Civil Air Transport, a CIA owned company. 37 American pilots participated in the effort to keep Dien Bien Phu supplied from the air.

7 May

French forces at Dien Bien Phu surrendered to the Viet Minh. 11,721 soldiers of the French army surrendered, many of them wounded. Most of the soldiers were from the French Foreign Legion or French colonial possessions in Africa and Indochina. 4,148 prisoners were repatriated later in 1954. Most of the others are presumed to have died in captivity although the fate of 3,013 Vietnamese serving in the French army and captured at Dien Bien Phu is unknown.

The French suffered about 9,000 dead, wounded, and missing in the battle. The French estimated that the Viet Minh suffered 23,000 dead and wounded. The Viet Minh claimed that they had only 9,000 casualties.

The United States was paying 80 percent of the cost of the French war against the Viet Minh.

24 May

After meeting Ngô Đình Diệm, the prospective Prime Minister of South Vietnam, in Paris, U.S. Ambassador Douglas Dillon told the State Department: "We were favorably impressed (with Diệm) but only in the realization that we are prepared to accept the seemingly ridiculous prospect that this Yogi-like mystic could assume the charge he is apparently about to undertake only because the standard set by his predecessors is so low."

== June ==
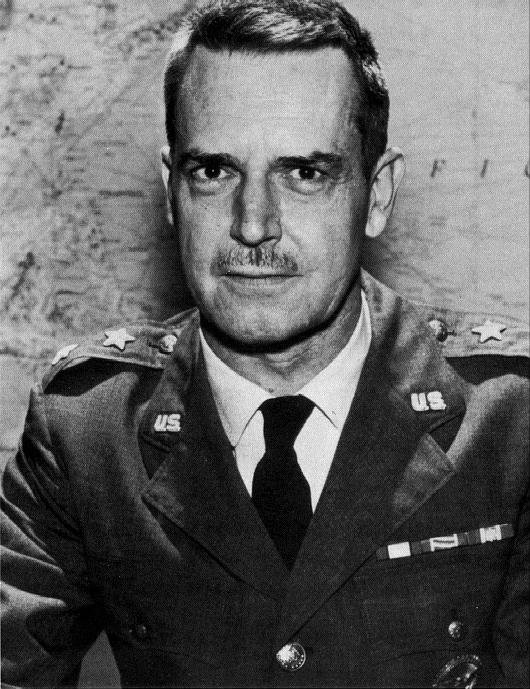
CIA operative and Air Force General Edward Lansdale, 1963.

In 1954: orange areas controlled by Viet Minh; purple areas controlled by France; dotted areas contested.

1 June

Colonel Edward Lansdale arrived in Saigon from the Philippines to create and lead the CIA's Saigon Military Mission (SMM). Lansdale, a former advertising executive, was tasked with helping pro-Western elements in Vietnam wage psychological and political warfare against the communist-dominated Viet Minh. The U.S. hoped than Lansdale could duplicate in Vietnam his success in helping the Philippines defeat the Hukbalahap insurgency.

2 June

In Saigon CIA operative Paul Harwood responded to a question from Ngô Đình Nhu, brother of Ngô Đình Diệm. Nhu asked what policies would persuade the U.S. to support his brother as Prime Minister. Harwood's terms were that the U.S. must participate directly in the training of the South Vietnamese army and the government of Vietnam must show uncompromising resistance to Viet Minh efforts to expand the territory under its control. Harwood's commitment to Diệm was unauthorized by the U.S. Government, but was tacitly accepted.

4 June

A CIA secretary in Saigon, Virginia Spence, established a close relationship with Ngô Dinh Nhu. She said of him and his followers. "The men who have schemed and fought...to get political power don't have any idea what to do with it now that it's within their grasp. They are like the bride who couldn't see beyond the end of the church aisle...They need support, all right, but they don't realize how much. On the same day, France recognizes the complete independence of the State of Vietnam within the French Union, France and Vietnam become equal member states within the Union.

14 June

Bửu Lộc resigns as Prime Minister of Vietnam, paving the way for the appointment of Ngô Đình Diệm. It is uncertain whether the U.S. encouraged, or merely acquiesced, in the appointment of Diệm. Both France and the United States appear to have decided he was the only viable candidate for the job.

The coat of arms of South Vietnam, 1954–1955

Five American enlisted men were taken captive by the Viet Minh on a beach near Da Nang. They were held until August 31 when they were repatriated as a result of the Geneva Accords.

20 June

The Premier of France, Pierre Mendès France, said that he "expected to have considerable difficulty with the new Vietnam government." Diệm, he said, was a "fanatic." His thoughts were echoed by other French officials: "Diệm is too narrow, too rigid, too unworldly", said one.

24 June

3,000 French troops withdrawing from An Khê toward Pleiku were ambushed in the Battle of Mang Yang Pass. The French suffered more than fifty percent casualties.

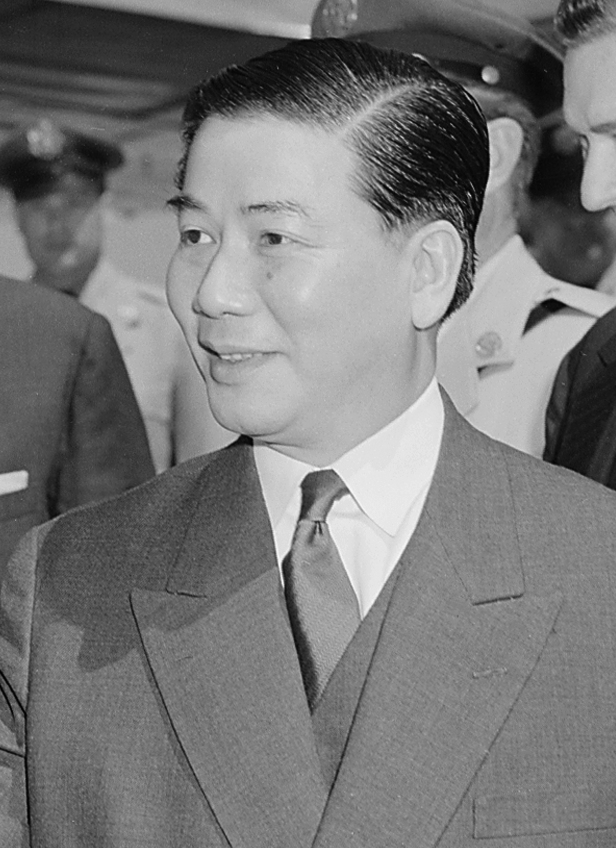
Ngô Đình Diệm, Prime Minister of South Vietnam.

26 June

Ngô Đình Diệm arrived in Saigon after four years of exile in France and the United States to assume the post of Prime Minister of the State of Vietnam. Diệm was appointed to the post by Emperor and chief of state Bảo Đại, who lived in France most of the time. Diệm was a Catholic appointed to rule a country that was predominantly Buddhist.

In the words of one historian, "Diệm's attractiveness to his first American patrons derived from three qualities: he was a certified anti-communist nationalist, he was a Roman Catholic, and he understood English." English language ability was rare among Vietnamese at the time.

== July ==
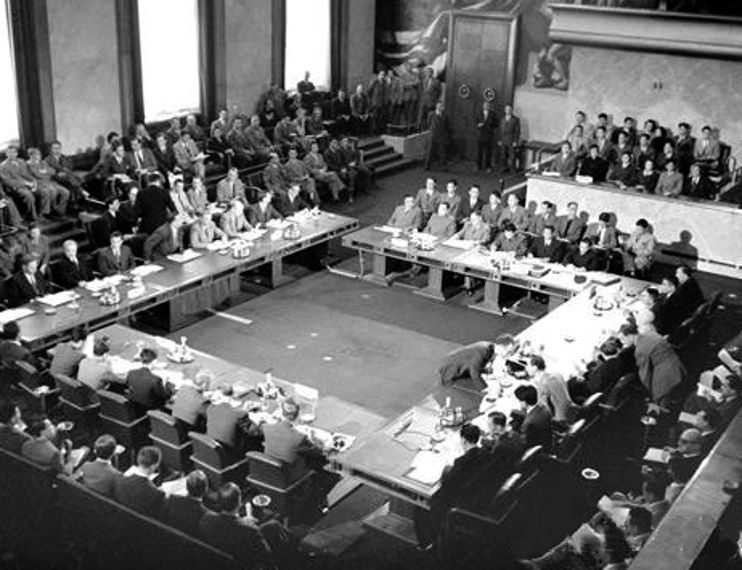
The Geneva Conference in 1954 which divided Vietnam into two provisional states: North Vietnam and South Vietnam.

17 July

The Battle of Chu Dreh Pass, takes place within the Central Highlands of French Indochina. It ended with the French battle group, 'Groupement Mobile No. 42' suffering heavy losses and the near destruction of the veteran Corée battalion. This was the last battle of the war with the Geneva ceasefire just three days later.

21 July

The Geneva Accords were signed in Paris. The accords called for a cease fire in the war, the independence of Vietnam, its division at the 17th parallel of latitude into two provisional states, North Vietnam and the State of Vietnam (South Vietnam), and the establishment of a demilitarized zone 10 kilometers (6 miles) wide separating the two provisional states. Viet Minh soldiers were to withdraw to the north and military forces allied to France to the south. Free movement between north and south was granted for 300 days.

The Final Declaration stated that the demarcation line at the 17th parallel between North and South Vietnam was only "provisional and should not in any way be interpreted as constituting a political or territorial boundary." Elections by secret ballot were to be held in July 1956 to unite the north and the south into a single country. (In his autobiography published in 1963, Eisenhower noted that "had elections been held as of the time of the fighting [1954], possibly 80 per cent of the population would have voted for the Communist Ho Chi Minh ... rather than chief of State Bao Dai." This clearly indicated major difficulties for any candidate other than Ho Chi Minh in those 1956 elections.)

Neither the United States nor the Viet Minh were pleased with the Geneva Accords, the U.S. because Vietnam north of the 17th parallel was given to the communist Viet Minh, the Viet Minh because, despite their military victory, they gained control over only one-half the country. Under pressure from the Soviet Union and China, the Viet Minh (hereafter called North Vietnam) signed the agreement. Neither the United States nor South Vietnam signed the Accords. The U.S. only "took note" of the Accords and promised not to "disturb them" by the threat or use of force.

24 July

Commenting on the Geneva Accords and U.S. objectives in Vietnam, Secretary of State John Foster Dulles said "The important thing...is to seize the future opportunity to prevent the loss of northern Vietnam from leading to the extension of Communism throughout Southeast Asia and the Southwest Pacific."

== August ==
Lansdale and a dozen operatives in the Saigon Military Mission began sabotage efforts which included distributing leaflets warning of the fate of the Vietnamese under the Viet Minh, encouraging immigration from the north to the south, discouraging immigration from the south to the north, contaminating the oil supply to ruin the motors of Hanoi buses, training potential guerrillas, hiring astrologers to make dire predictions of disaster in the north and peace in the south, and smuggling arms and other equipment to paramilitary anti-communist groups in the north.

12 August

President Eisenhower and the National Security Council decided that the U.S. would provide assistance for military training in South Vietnam "working through the French only insofar as necessary." The U.S. Joint Chiefs of Staff were reluctant to undertake the training mission as they believed conditions in South Vietnam were too unsettled to make training the South Vietnamese army feasible. The decision to train the South Vietnam army, in the opinion of one historian, "set in motion a chain of events that would prove irreversible."

16 August

An Air Vietnam Bristol Freighter evacuating civilians from Hanoi to Saigon crashed while making an emergency landing at Pakse, Laos killing 47 on board.

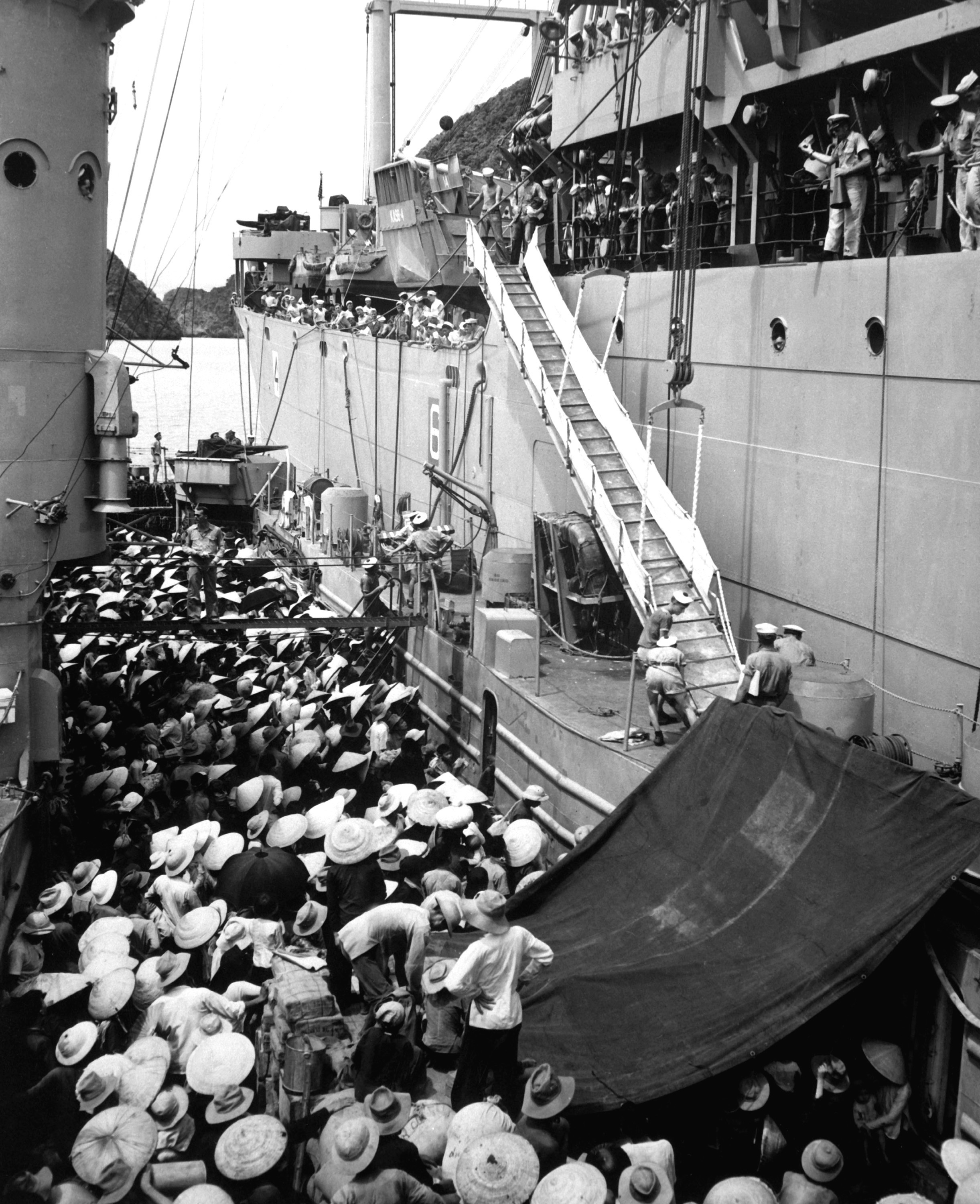
Vietnamese refugees in Haiphong, North Vietnam wait to board a U.S. Navy ship for the journey to South Vietnam.

17 August

A U.S. navy ship, the USS Menard, left Haiphong carrying 1,924 refugees on a three-day journey to Saigon. The Geneva Accords allowed for free movement between the northern and southern zones of Vietnam for a period of 300 days. The Menard was the first of many U.S. and French navy ships to transport refugees from north to south. The navy program to transport refugees from the north to the south was called Operation Passage to Freedom.

From August 1954 until July 1955, between 600,000 and one million northerners moved south, while between 14,000 and 45,000 civilians and approximately 100,000 Viet Minh fighters moved in the opposite direction. About 75 percent of the migrants to the south were Catholics. North Vietnam left behind in South Vietnam 8,000 to 10,000 covert civilian and military personnel, most of them members of the communist party. The task of the "stay-behinds" was political activism to ensure a victory for Ho Chi Minh in the national elections called for in 1956 in the Geneva Accords.

Among the American naval personnel working in Haiphong was Dr. Tom Dooley who would write an influential, best-selling, anti-communist book, Deliver us From Evil, and become one of the most outspoken anti-communists of the day.

24 August

President Eisenhower wrote President Diệm a letter assuring Diệm that the United States would support his government if he continued to implement democratic reforms. This letter was later cited by U.S. President Lyndon Johnson as the first step in the U.S. commitment to support South Vietnam.

== September ==
8 September

In Manila, the U.S., Australia, France, New Zealand, Pakistan, Philippines, Thailand, and the United Kingdom signed the treaty creating the Southeast Asia Treaty Organization (SEATO), a collective defense agreement that had among its objectives protecting Laos, Cambodia, and South Vietnam from communist aggression.

15-24 September

Prime Minister Diệm faced the first crisis of his new government. He dismissed the Army chief of staff General Nguyễn Văn Hinh and ordered him to leave the country. Hinh refused to obey and a few days later surrounded the Presidential palace with tanks. Nine of Diệm's 15-member cabinet resigned. Col. Lansdale attempted to buy support for Diệm from leaders of the Hòa Hảo and Cao Đài religious sects. Diệm resolved the political crisis temporarily by appointing four Hòa Hảo and two Cao Đài leaders to his government.

29 September

The United States and France concluded an agreement that henceforth all U.S. aid to Vietnam would go directly to the Vietnamese government rather than through the French government.

== October ==
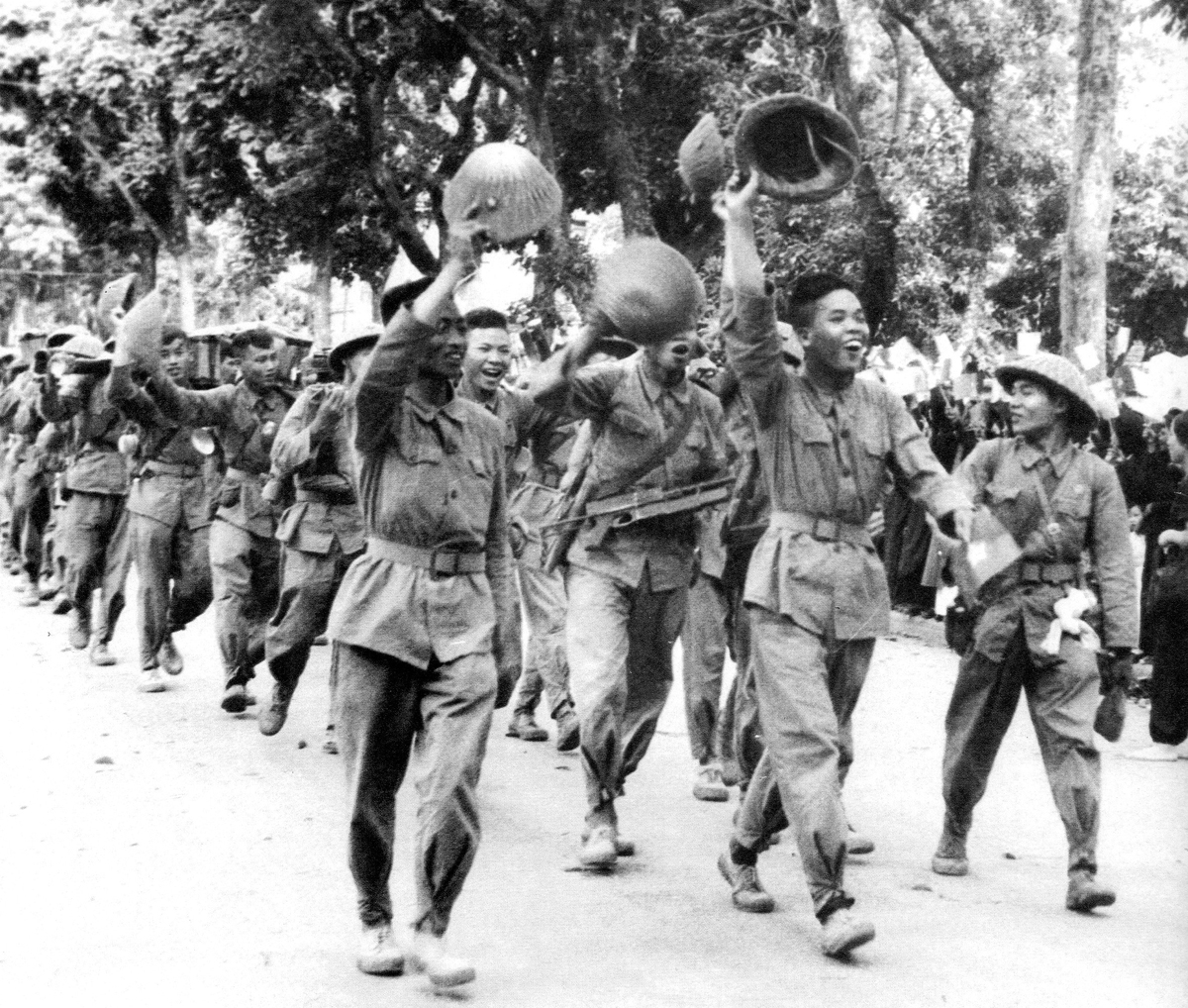
Victorious Viet Minh soldiers parade through the streets of Hanoi on October 9, 1954.

9 October

Viet Minh soldiers arrived to take control of Hanoi, capital city of French Indochina. That afternoon the French military garrison lowered its flag for the last time and withdrew from the city. The French military retained a presence in South Vietnam.

12 October

Viet Minh leader Ho Chi Minh entered Hanoi without fanfare and took up the reins of the government of North Vietnam.

15 October

U.S. Senator Mike Mansfield, who knew Diệm and had visited Vietnam, issued a report stating that the "alternatives to Diệm" were "not promising" and warning the Vietnamese that if Diệm were overthrown the U.S. should consider an "immediate suspension of all aid to Vietnam."

18 October

In a meeting in Hanoi with French official Jean Sainteny, Ho Chi Minh said he hoped France would retain a cultural and economic presence in North Vietnam and reassured the Frenchman that Vietnam would pursue independent policies not dictated by the communist governments of China or the Soviet Union. Ho envisioned only a slow transition to socialism. Sainteny warned his government, however, that North Vietnam would fight to prevent the permanent division of Vietnam into two countries.

22 October

The U.S. Department of State instructed the Military Assistance Advisory Group (MAAG) in Saigon to begin a "program of training that number of Vietnamese armed forces necessary to carry out internal security missions."

24 October

President Eisenhower sent a letter to Prime Minister Diệm promising U.S. assistance if Diệm met "standards of performance." Diệm agreed. This letter was later cited as the initial commitment by the U.S. to support South Vietnam.

26 October

The Chief of Staff of the South Vietnamese army, Nguyễn Văn Hinh, planned to attack the Presidential palace and overthrow the Diệm government. Landsdale and the SMM got wind of the coup d'état and persuaded two key military supporters of Hinh to make an official visit to the Philippines accompanied by Lansdale. With his supporters absent, Hinh called off the proposed coup.

29 October

The record for the most passengers taken in one journey during Operation Passage to Freedom was set by the USS General Black, which sailed with 5,224 Vietnamese aboard.

== November ==
8 November

General Lawton Collins arrived in Saigon as special representative of the United States. He affirmed President Eisenhower's earlier expression of support for Ngô Đình Diệm. Collins promised $100 million in U.S. aid and stated that the Diệm government "is the legal government in Vietnam." He warned the South Vietnamese army that it would receive American assistance only if it supported Diệm.

14 November

U.S. Ambassador Donald R. Heath departed Vietnam, leaving Collins as the senior U.S. official in the country. Heath was considered by Washington to be too accommodating to the French and too disparaging of Prime Minister Diệm.

29 November

General Vinh left Vietnam for exile in Paris, thereby reducing the possibility of a military coup against the Diệm government. His principal co-conspirators followed. Vinh had been ordered to leave Vietnam almost two months earlier by Diệm, but had ignored the order until ordered to depart by Bảo Đại.

== December ==
North Vietnam concluded an aid agreement with China for equipment and technical assistance to repair roads, railroads, and other infrastructure. Russian and Chinese technical advisers began to replace the French.

13 December

General Collins and General Paul Ely, commander of the French military in South Vietnam, signed a "Minute of Understanding" to govern the withdrawal of French military forces from South Vietnam. The South Vietnamese army would be reduced in size from 170,000 to a more-affordable 90,000 men, the Americans and French would cooperate in training the army, and France would turn over full control of the Vietnamese army to Vietnam by July 1955.

16 December

Collins quickly came to agree with former Ambassador Heath's low opinion of Diệm. Collins suggested that the U.S. give thought to "possible alternatives" if the Diệm government did not make progress and, if no acceptable alternative to Diệm could be found, the U.S. should consider withdrawing from Vietnam.

24 December

U.S. Secretary of State John Foster Dulles rebuked Collins for his suggestion that an alternative to Diệm be sought. Dulles said that under "present circumstances...we have no choice but to continue...our support of Diệm."

== See also ==
- 1940–1946 in French Indochina
- 1947–1950 in French Indochina
- 1955 in the Vietnam War
- Operation Passage to Freedom
