= Francis G. Brink =

United States Army officer (1893–1952)

- Brink in uniform, c. 1948
- Born: 22 August 1893; Marathon, New York, U.S.
- Died: 24 June 1952 (aged 58); The Pentagon, Arlington, Virginia, U.S.
- Burial place: Arlington National Cemetery
- Military career
- Branch: United States Army
- Service years: 1917–1952
- Rank: Brigadier General
- Units: China Burma India Theater; South East Asia Command
- Commands: MAAG Indo-China
- Wars: World War I World War II
- Awards: Distinguished Service Medal; Legion of Merit (2); Purple Heart

Francis Gerard Brink (22 August 1893 – 24 June 1952) was a brigadier general in the United States Army who served in World War II. He was the first commander of MAAG Indo-China and was found dead of gunshot wounds in the Pentagon on 24 June 1952.

== Early life and education ==
Francis Gerard Brink was born on 22 August 1893 in Marathon, New York. He graduated from Cornell University.

== Military career ==
At the beginning of the Pacific War Brink was serving with the U.S. Army liaison mission in Singapore. He served in the China Burma India Theater and from 1944 to 1945 was chief of operations for South East Asia Command. From 1948 to 1949 he served as chief of the Army Advisory Staff in China and saw the defeat of the Nationalist forces. In October 1950 he was appointed as the first commander of MAAG Indo-China.

== Death ==
In early June 1952, Brink returned to the U.S. for two weeks of consultation on the situation in Indochina. On the afternoon of 24 June 1952 he was found dead in his office at the Pentagon in an apparent suicide. He had three bullet wounds in his chest and an automatic pistol was found beside him. Brink was reported to have been suffering from depression, diabetes and arteriosclerosis.

Chief of Staff of the United States Army, General J. Lawton Collins said that, having noted Brink's tired appearance, he had ordered his staff to ensure that Brink rested before returning to Indochina. Acting Secretary of State David K. E. Bruce said that Brink had made a "major contribution" to fighting "Communist aggression" in Indochina. He was buried in Arlington National Cemetery.

== Decorations ==
Brink's decorations include Distinguished Service Medal, Legion of Merit and Purple Heart.
