= 1955 in the Vietnam War =

← 1954 1956 →
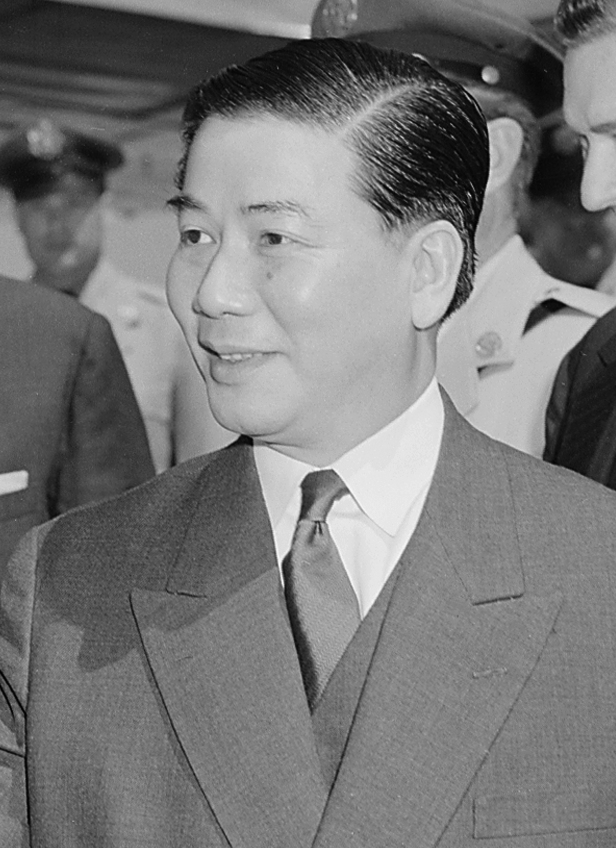
- Ngô Đình Diệm took power after a rigged election
Location	Indochina

Belligerents
South Vietnam	Anti-government insurgents: (Vietnam) Viet Minh cadres -Bình Xuyên Supported by SDECE -Hòa Hảo sect -Cao Đài sect

Commanders and leaders
	Ba Cụt

In 1955, the Prime Minister of South Vietnam Ngô Đình Diệm faced a severe challenge to his rule over South Vietnam from the Bình Xuyên criminal gang and the Cao Đài and Hòa Hảo religious sects. In the Battle of Saigon in April, Diệm's army eliminated the Bình Xuyên as a rival and soon also reduced the power of the sects. The United States, which had been wavering in its support of Diệm before the battle, strongly supported him afterwards. Diệm declined to enter into talks with North Vietnam concerning an election in 1956 to unify the country. Diệm called a national election in October and easily defeated Head of State Bảo Đại, thus becoming President of South Vietnam.

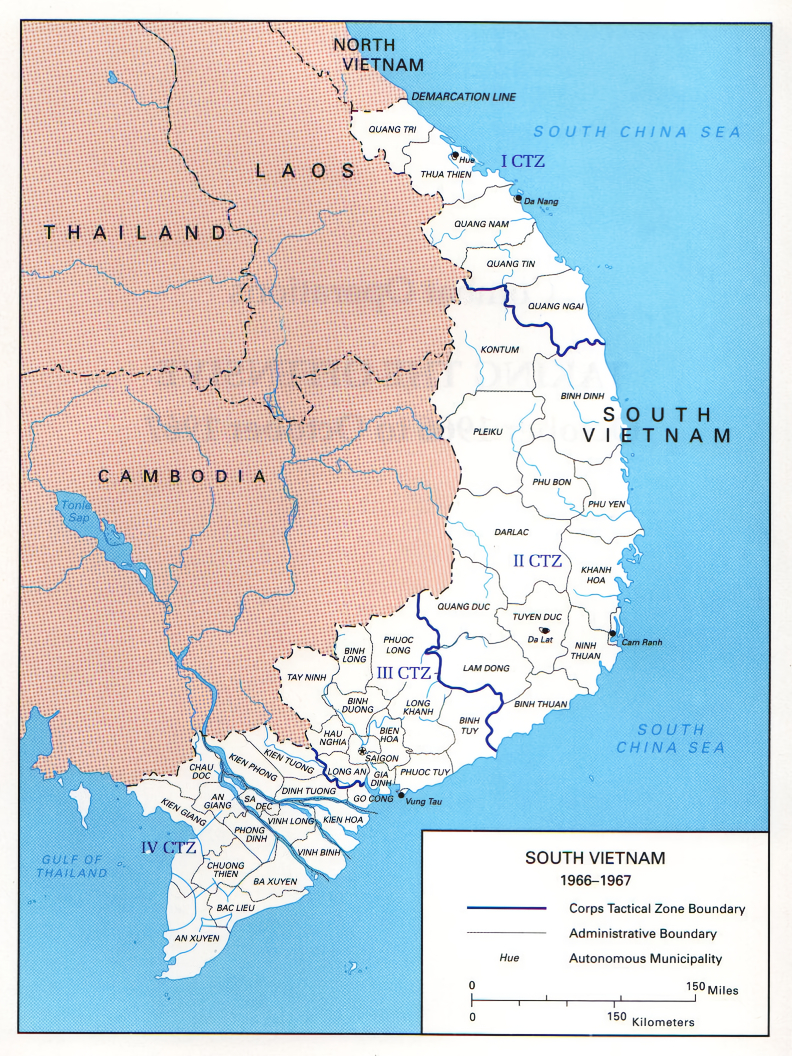
A map of South Vietnam showing provincial boundaries and names and military zones (I, II, III, and IV Corps).

In communist North Vietnam, Ho Chi Minh initiated a land reform program that was accomplished with many executions and imprisonments of "landlords." Ho was unable to get the support of China and the Soviet Union to press for preliminary talks that would lead to the 1956 elections called for in the Geneva Accord.

== January ==
1 January

Ho Chi Minh at a triumphal parade in Hanoi announced his government's policy to restore and develop the economy of North Vietnam. One of his priorities was a land reform program to give "land to the tillers."

South Vietnam became independent from the French Union's franc zone and the Vietnam National Army (VNA) became eligible to receive U.S. military aid directly rather than through the French military establishment still present in South Vietnam. The change increased Prime Minister Diệm's control of the VNA.

8 January

With the advice of American and French experts, the government of South Vietnam adopted Ordinance No. 2 which set the rent tenant farmers were obligated to pay to landlords to a maximum of 25 percent of the crop. Some tenants considered the 25 percent rate exorbitant. During the first year of the operation of the Ordinance, about one-fourth of the more than one million tenant farmers in South Vietnam signed contracts with landowners establishing rental rates. The Ordinance was the first major effort in South Vietnam to counter the influence and popularity of the Viet Minh in rural areas. The Viet Minh had dispossessed many landlords and given land and influence to poor and landless farmers.

22 January

Viet Minh leader Lê Đức Thọ departed from southernmost Vietnam for North Vietnam in accordance with the Geneva Accords which permitted free movement for 300 days between the provisional states of North and South Vietnam. His commander, Lê Duẩn, remained clandestinely in the Mekong Delta and Saigon. Lê Duẩn was charged with maintaining a communist infrastructure in southern region. He remained in the south until 1957.

31 January

Colonel Edward Lansdale, head of the Central Intelligence Agency (CIA)'s Saigon Military Mission (SMM), reported to Washington that his team had smuggled 300 rifles, 50 pistols, 100,000 rounds of ammunition and 300 pounds of explosives into North Vietnam. The arms were distributed to anti-communist organizations in North Vietnam created by the SMM or cached for future use.

== February ==
1 February

General Paul Ely, French military commander in South Vietnam, informed Diệm that by July 1, 1955, all units of the VNA would be commanded by Vietnamese officers. France was turning over all control and responsibility for the army to the government of South Vietnam.

3 February

President Diem, prodded by U.S. advisers, adopted the first of several land reform measures in South Vietnam. This initial program governed the amount of rent that land owners could charge for agricultural land.

8 February

North Vietnam's land reform program was underway and thousands of "landlords" were being executed or imprisoned. Ho said "Some cadres are using the same methods to crush the masses as the imperialists, capitalists, and feudalists did. These methods are barbaric...It is absolutely forbidden to use physical punishment." Ho's admonishment had little apparent impact as the repression continued.

In South Vietnam, France halted subsidies to the Cao Đài and Hòa Hảo religious sects, both of whom had armed forces raised and financed by France to fight the Viet Minh. The sects demanded that the subsidies continue to be paid to them by the Diệm government. Diệm refused and with several million dollars supplied by the CIA's Colonel Lansdale bribed sect leaders to gain their support and integrate their forces into the VNA.

22 February

Representatives of the Bình Xuyên, a well-armed mafia controlling gambling, narcotics, the Saigon police force and the Cao Đài and Hòa Hảo religious sects agreed to form a United Front against the Diệm government. The Bình Xuyên, under Bảy Viễn, set up defenses around their headquarters in Saigon.

== March ==
1 March

U.S. Secretary of State John Foster Dulles announced at a press conference in Saigon that "I do not know of any responsible quarter which has any doubt about backing Diệm as the head of this government." In fact, General Lawton Collins, the senior U.S. official in South Vietnam, and many French officials had expressed strong reservations about the ability of Diệm to rule the country.

8 March

Viet Minh forces evacuated the Cà Mau peninsula at the southernmost tip of South Vietnam to depart to North Vietnam in accordance with the Geneva Accords. Anticipating the evacuation, Col. Lansdale and his group had implemented an accelerated program (Occupation Liberty) to prepare the South Vietnamese army to occupy the area as the Viet Minh withdrew. The occupation proceeded smoothly with propaganda leaflets dropped by air, medical dispensaries established, rice distributed, and roads improved. However, "the political and social conditions which had long generated support for the Viet Minh remained virtually unchanged.

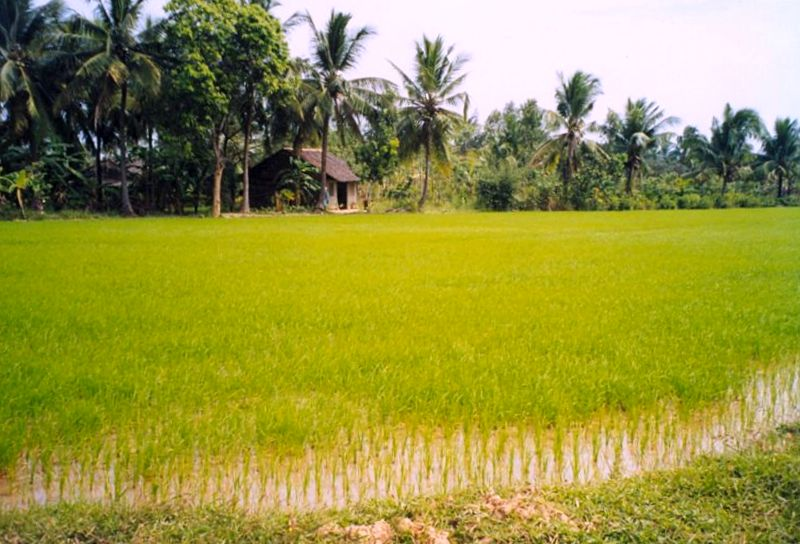
The Mekong Delta was the chief rice growing area of Vietnam and the home of most tenant farmers in South Vietnam. The Viet Minh controlled much of the delta region.

12 March

Diệm launched a sudden offensive against Hoa Hao General Ba Cụt in Thốt Nốt, shelling the area heavily. The battle was inconclusive and both sides blamed the other for causing instability and disrupting the situation.

21 March

The National Front of Bình Xuyên, Cao Đài, and Hòa Hảo demanded that Diệm form a government of "national union" and gave him 5 days to comply. Diệm ignored the demand.

28 March

Diệm made a counter demand that the Bình Xuyên evacuate the areas and buildings they had occupied in Saigon and vicinity. The French were tacitly helping the Bình Xuyên. Collins wanted the French to persuade Diệm to compromise; Lansdale wanted the French out of South Vietnam.

30 March

Diệm's replacement of the police chief caused a brief battle between the VNA and Bin Xuyen police and militia. The French brokered a cease fire but the Bình Xuyên, army, and French military each fortified the areas they controlled in Saigon. Due to resignations, Diệm's government now consisted mostly of members of his family.

31 March

From Saigon, General Collins informed Washington that Diệm lacked "the ability to head a government." Several journalists published similar reports as Saigon descended into chaos during April.

== April ==
23 April

Collins had been recalled to Washington for consultations and at a lunch where Dulles' view was reiterated that Diệm must be replaced.

Ba Cụt and three other Hòa Hảo military leaders refused a government offer to integrate, and continued to operate autonomously.

27 April

The State Department sent top-secret cables to the U.S. Embassies in Saigon and Paris ordering the embassies to initiate a process of removing Diệm from power and replacing him with a leader chosen by General Collins and French General Ely in Saigon. The embassies were instructed to tell Diệm that the U.S. and France were "no longer in a position to prevent his removal from office."

Six hours after Dulles' cables calling for Diệm's ouster Lansdale, at Diệm's side in Saigon, reported to Washington that fighting had broken out in the streets of Saigon between the Bình Xuyên and the VNA. These were the opening shots in the Battle of Saigon which would continue for about one month. On hearing of the news of the fighting, Dulles canceled the cables, awaiting developments in Saigon before proceeding.

Neither the Cao Đài nor the Hòa Hảo joined the Bình Xuyên in the battle. Bribes paid by Diệm and Lansdale to their leaders caused them to remain neutral or to unite their armed forces with the VNA.

28 April

Lansdale cabled Washington asserting that Diệm was still the best alternative as the leader of South Vietnam.

30 April

The VNA had largely defeated the Bình Xuyên and its 40,000 armed soldiers. Casualties on both sides plus civilians amounted to about 500 dead, 1000 wounded and 20,000 homeless due to widespread destruction over a square mile of Saigon. Many of the surviving Bình Xuyên fled to the countryside, taking refuge in the swamps of the Mekong River delta. The Bình Xuyên leader, Bảy Viễn, escaped to Paris with French assistance. A few members of the Bình Xuyên would wage guerrilla war against the Diệm government for the next two or three years and would eventually be absorbed into the Viet Cong guerrillas.

== May ==
8–11 May

During three days of talks in Paris among Dulles, French Prime Minister Edgar Faure, and the British, Faure proposed that both the U.S. and France withdraw from Vietnam because "Diệm is leading to a catastrophe." Dulles did not agree and indicated that the U.S. would continue to support Diệm—even if that support caused the French to withdraw from South Vietnam. At this conference, in the words of historian Seth Jacobs, Vietnam became "America's war" rather than France's.

14 May

General Collins left Vietnam and his position as the senior U.S. official in South Vietnam to return to the United States. He had failed to persuade Dulles and the Eisenhower Administration that Diệm was not a viable leader of South Vietnam.

16 May

In the wake of Diệm's victory over the Bình Xuyên, he was lionized in the American media, notably by publisher Henry Luce in Life: "Every son, daughter, and even distant admirer of the American Revolution should be overjoyed and learn to shout...'Hurrah for Ngo Dinh Diem!'...Diem's political assets...are just what his country needs...He is a Roman Catholic and a simon-pure Vietnamese nationalist, thus doubly proof against communist force...back Diem to the hilt."

The United States signed a military assistance agreement with Cambodia, thus replacing France in providing assistance to the Cambodian armed forces.

20 May

French military forces withdrew from Saigon to a coastal enclave. From there they would be slowly withdrawn from Vietnam.

28 May

G. Frederick Reinhardt, a career diplomat, presented his credentials to Diệm as the U.S.'s new Ambassador to Vietnam. Dulles's instruction to Reinhardt was "to give complete, loyal, and sincere support to the government of President Diệm."

== June ==
2 June

General Ely, French commander in South Vietnam, left the country signalling the pullout of all French military forces from Vietnam.

5 June

With the Bình Xuyên vanquished, Diệm turned his attention to conquering the Hòa Hảo. The battle between government troops began in Cần Thơ on 5 June. Five Hòa Hảo battalions surrendered immediately; Commander Ba Cụt and three remaining leaders fled to the Cambodian border. The other leaders soon surrendered but Ba Cụt and his 3,000 armed men continued to resist the army until 1956.

25 June—8 July

Ho Chi Minh made an official visit to China and the Soviet Union. He received pledges of $200 million in aid from China and $100 million from the Soviet Union, but neither China nor the Soviet Union agreed to attempt to pressure the United States and other Western countries to hold 1956 national elections in Vietnam.

30 June

Zhou Enlai, the premier of China, said the United States was violating the Geneva Accords and that the national elections scheduled for July 20, 1956, might not be held due to U.S. and South Vietnamese opposition.

== July ==
16 July

Diệm in a speech said that South Vietnam was not bound by the Geneva Accords and that conditions necessary for free elections did not exist in the North.

20 July

The Geneva Accords called for consultations to begin on this date regarding national elections to select a government for a united Vietnam on July 20, 1956. Diệm refused to enter into talks with North Vietnam. He said that South Vietnam had not been a signatory of the Geneva Accords and that the "fundamental freedoms" for free and open elections did not exist under the communist government of North Vietnam. The United States declined to pressure Diệm into talks with the North Vietnamese.

== August ==
12 August

The State Department stated that, "to avoid...accusations...of trying to sabotage the Geneva Settlement...the number of U.S. military personnel at present in Indochina at any given time should not exceed 342 persons, the number called for...at the time the Geneva Accord was signed.

30 August

Dulles publicly supported Diệm's position that conditions were not right in the North for free elections.

== October ==
Diệm ordered the army to march on the Cao Đài political center in Tây Ninh under the shadow of the Black Virgin Mountain. He forced the Cao Đài pope, Pham Cong Tac, to flee to Cambodia where he died in 1959. Diệm absorbed the Cao Đài army into the fledgling Army of the Republic of Vietnam.

23 October

The State of Vietnam referendum of 1955 determined the future form of government of the State of Vietnam, the nation that was to become the Republic of Vietnam (widely known as South Vietnam). It was contested by Prime Minister Diệm, who proposed a republic, and former emperor Bảo Đại. Bảo Đại had abdicated as emperor in 1945 and at the time of the referendum held the title of head of state. Diệm won the election, which was widely marred by electoral fraud, with 98.2% of the vote. In the capital Saigon, Diệm was credited with over 600,000 votes, even though only 450,000 people were on the electoral roll. He accumulated tallies in excess of 90% of the registered voters, even in rural regions where opposition groups prevented voting.

26 October

Diệm was declared the winner of the election and President of the new Republic of Vietnam, more commonly called South Vietnam.

31 October

The government of South Vietnam reported that 676,348 Catholics, 209,132 Buddhists, and 1,041 Protestants had migrated to South Vietnam from the North since the conclusion of the Geneva Accords on July 20, 1954. The United States Navy's participation in the exodus from North Vietnam was called Operation Passage to Freedom.

Between 14,000 – 45,000 civilians and approximately 100,000 Viet Minh fighters moved from South Vietnam to the north. North Vietnam left behind in South Vietnam 8,000 to 10,000 covert civilian and military personnel, most of them members of the communist party

The American media portrayed the migration as a spontaneous flight from communism, but French scholar Bernard Fall accused the U.S. of stimulating the exodus in a "very successful psychological warfare operation" managed by Col. Edward Lansdale of the CIA.

== November ==
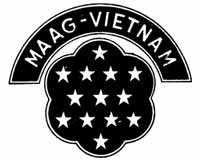
Emblem of MAAG Vietnam

November 1

The American Military Assistance Advisory Group (MAAG) for South Vietnam was created. MAAG was reorganized from covering all of Indochina into MAAGs for each of the countries (Cambodia, Laos, South Vietnam). General Samuel Tankersley Williams was the chief of the newly created MAAG. (Due to the creation of the MAAG for Vietnam on this date, in 1998 after a high level review by the Department of Defense (DoD) and through the efforts of Richard B. Fitzgibbon's family, November 1, 1955, became the earliest qualifying date for inclusion of American combat deaths on the wall of the Vietnam Veterans Memorial.

== December ==
Graham Greene's novel The Quiet American was published in England and later in the U.S. It portrayed American policy in South Vietnam in a negative light. In the words of one reviewer, "American readers were incensed, perhaps not so much because of the biased portrait of obtuse and destructive American innocence and idealism but because...it was drawn with such acid pleasure by a middle-class English snob..." The principal American character in the novel is often erroneously believed to be modeled on CIA operative Edward Lansdale, but Greene began writing the novel before Lansdale's arrival in Vietnam.

8 December

The executive committee of the American Friends of Vietnam met for the first time. The AFVN was founded in the United States to encourage U.S. support for the Diệm government. The members included many prominent politicians, both Democrat and Republican, including John F. Kennedy, Hubert Humphrey and Mike Mansfield. The committee invited General John W. O'Daniel ("Iron Mike") to serve as chairman of the board of AFV. O'Daniel was a fervent supporter of Ngô Đình Diệm.

9 December

The Joint Chiefs of Staff of the United States Department of Defense requested that the ceiling of 342 U.S. military personnel in South Vietnam be raised. With the ongoing withdrawal of the French, the manpower ceiling had become a "serious handicap." Dulles turned down the request to avoid violating the Geneva Accords which prohibited any increases in foreign military personnel in Vietnam.

South Vietnam withdrew from the French Union Assembly and terminated many financial and economic agreements with France, thus severing nearly all its former colonial ties to France.

12 December

The United States closed its embassy in Hanoi, thus ending formal diplomatic relations with North Vietnam. The U.S. would not restore diplomatic relations until 1998.

24 December

China informed North Vietnam that all members of the China Military Advisory Group, which had been in Vietnam since July 1950, would return to China. This action by China illustrated the Chinese view that the most important task of North Vietnam was to consolidate its rule rather than attempt to force reunification with South Vietnam.
