= American China Policy Association =

Anti-communist organization in support of Taiwan

American China Policy Association (ACPA)
- Formation: 1946
- Founder: J. B. Powell, Helen Loomis
- Founded at: New York City
- Dissolved: January 1950
- Headquarters: New York City
- Location: 1 West 37th Street
- Chairman President: Alfred Kohlberg
- President: J. B. Powell, Clare Booth Luce, William Loeb III
- Vice President: Helen Loomis
- Board of directors: Alfred Kohlberg, Freda Utley, Irene Corbally Kuhn, Max Eastman, Walter H. Judd, William R. Johnson, Isaac Don Levine, David Prescott Barrows, William Henry Chamberlin, George Creel, Roscoe Pound
- Key people: Alfred Kohlberg
- Affiliations: Plain Talk magazine, American Jewish League Against Communism

The American China Policy Association (ACPA) was an anti-communist organization that supported the government of Republic of China, now commonly referred to as Taiwan, under Chiang Kai-shek.

== Origins ==
On July 17, 1946, J. B. Powell, correspondent, and Helen Loomis, missionary teacher, founded the American China Policy Association (ACPA). Alfred Kohlberg, a leader in the China Lobby joined as chairman shortly thereafter to promote American interests by promoting the Republic of China under Chiang Kai-shek and the Kuomintang as a counter to Soviet and Chinese Communist support. (Another source says that Kohlberg established ACPA.)

== Activities ==
In 1947, co-founder J. B. Powell died, succeeded by Clare Booth Luce (wife of Henry R. Luce) as president for one year, then by newspaper publisher William Loeb III.

In 1949, when the Chinese Communist Party seized full control of mainland China and established the People's Republic of China, the ACPA accused the United States Department of State of "losing China." ACPA supported its allegations with copious literature: letters, pamphlets, brochures, press releases, and book reviews. Kohlberg's name went on most of those publications.

ACPA obtained two US Army intelligence reports, which it reproduced via "photolithography" and made available to the press; these documents showed numerous errors and omissions by the State Department.

Directly and through ACPA, Kohlberg criticized US President Harry S. Truman and US Secretary of State George C. Marshall.

During the Korean War, ACPA advocacy "effectively changed" America's orientation with regard to Communist China.

== Members ==
ACPA's board of directors included:

- Alfred Kohlberg (also member of AJLAC, Plain Talk)
- Isaac Don Levine (also member of AJLAC, Plain Talk)
- Clare Booth Luce
- William Loeb III
- Freda Utley
- Irene Corbally Kuhn
- Max Eastman
- Walter H. Judd
- Geraldine Fitch
- William R. Johnson
- Margaret Proctor Smith
- David Prescott Barrows
- William Henry Chamberlin
- George Creel
- Roscoe Pound

Another person associated with ACPA was Edna Lonigan.

== See also ==
- Alfred Kohlberg
- Plain Talk
- Anti-communism
