= Joint Committee Against Communism =

American anti-communist organization

- Formation: January 1950
- Founder: Rabbi Benjamin Schultz
- Founded at: New York City
- Dissolved: c. Late 1950s
- Chairman: Alfred Kohlberg
- Executive Director: Rabbi Benjamin Schultz
- Board of directors: Theodore Kirkpatrick, Roy Cohn
- Affiliations: Counterattack (newsletter), Red Channels newsletter, Plain Talk magazine

The Joint Committee Against Communism, also known as the Joint Committee Against Communism in New York, was an anti-communist organization during the 1950s.They worked to curb or ban various politicians, military figures, religious figures, unions, radio commentators, actors they believed were involved with the Communist Party USA and communism in general.

== Origins ==
Benjamin Schultz of Rochester, New York, had studied under Rabbi Stephen S. Wise at the Jewish Institute of Religion in New York City. He was ordained as a rabbi in 1931 and served a Reform congregation, Temple Emanu-El in Yonkers, New York. From October 14 to 16, 1947, Schultz published a series of articles in the New York World-Telegram on Communism among Protestant and Catholic churches and Jewish synagogues. He attacked the Reverend Dr. Harry F. Ward of Union Theological Seminary, Abraham Cronbach of Hebrew Union College, and Stephen S. Wise by name.

On March 15, 1948, Schultz announced in the New York Times the founding of the American Jewish League Against Communism, Inc. (AJLAC). AJLAC claimed to side with an "overwhelming majority of American Jewry" against Communism. It praised David Dubinsky, Abraham Cahan, Walter Winchell, and David Lawrence. Schultz declared, "Zionism and communism are incompatible." Headquartered at 220 West Forty-second Street, AJLAC sought to remove "all Communist activity in Jewish life, wherever it may be."

AJLAC national organizing members included:

- Benjamin Schultz (executive director)
- Alfred Kohlberg (chairman), listed as "head of the board of directors of the American China Policy Association, Inc."
- Harry Pasternak, retired realtor (treasurer)
- Benjamin Gitlow, former general secretary of the Communist Party USA
- George Sokolsky, nationally syndicated columnist
- Eugene Lyons, nationally syndicated columnist
- Isaac Don Levine, nationally syndicated columnist and editor of Plain Talk
- Rabbi David S. Savitz
- Rabbi Ascher M. Yager
- Mrs. Harry Lang
- Allen Lesser
- Nathan D. Shapiro
- Maurice Tishman
- Mrs. Vivienne T. Wechter
- Charles Kreindler, International Ladies Garment Workers Union, AFL
- Louis Nelson, International Ladies Garment Workers Union, AFL

(Pasternak had a seat on the New York Stock Exchange.) Roy Cohn joined as a member of the board of directors. Anti-communist journalist Isaac Don Levine was also a co-founder.

On May 31, 1948, Schultz testified in support of the Mundt-Nixon Bill. In July 1948, Sokolsky mentioned formation of an AJLAC office in Los Angeles. In early 1949, Schultz testified to the Brooklyn Board of Education against the Jewish Peoples Fraternal Order, a member of the Communist-controlled International Workers Order; a week later, the board followed his recommendation and banned the group from classrooms. In March 1949, he publicly opposed a Soviet delegation led by Dmitri Shostakovich from entering the United States. In July 1949, Schultz also attacked Paul Robeson during the latter's hearings before the House Un-American Activities Committee.

== Formation ==
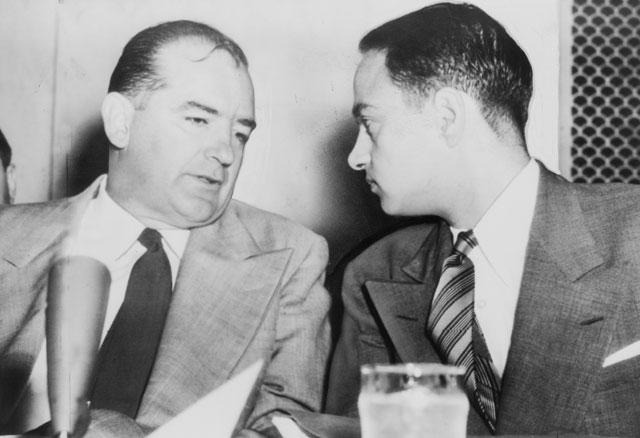
Roy Cohn (here with US Senaotor Joseph McCarthy during Army–McCarthy hearings in 1953) was a board member of AJLAC, a core coalition member of the Joint Committee Against Communism: both Cohn and McCarthy later received public recognition from the committee

In late January 1950, the committee formed in response to a call from George Craig, head of the American Legion, when 60 national organizations.

The founders of the Joint Committee Against Communism were:

- Rabbi Benjamin Schultz, executive director, American Jewish League Against Communism
- Alfred Kohlberg, chairman, American Jewish League Against Communism
- Theodore Kirkpatrick, managing editor, Red Channels and founder, Counterattack

Kohlberg, a prominent member of the China Lobby and publisher of Plain Talk magazine, bankrolled the committee. As of July 1949, Rabbi Schultz named AJLAC's executive board members as: "Gen. Julius Klein, a past national commander of the Jewish War Veterans; your own colleague, the Hon. Abraham J. Multer; Isaac Don Levine; Eugene Lyons; Alfred Kohlberg; Morrie Ryskind, of Hollywood; Rabbi David S. Savitz; and Rabbi Ascher M. Yager, leading orthodox rabbis of New York." In 1948, Multer ran for office against ex-CIO general counsel Lee Pressman. Multer used Pressman's communist association against him early on by claiming that he had received his "certificate of election" from the Daily Worker (CPUSA newspaper), thanks to its condemnation of him.)

The Joint Committee Against Communism drew together a coalition of several New York State groups and sub-groups including the American Legion, the Veterans of Foreign Wars, and Catholic War Veterans, and the Veterans Division of AJLAC.

In 1954, board members of the committee's core group, AJLAC, included: Alfred Kohlberg (chair), Benjamin Schultz (executive director), Harry Pasternak (treasurer) as well as Bern Dibner, Lawrence Fertig, Theodore Fine, Benjamin Gitlow, Walter R. Hart, Herman Kashins, Eugene Lyons, Norman L. Marks, Morris Ryskind, David S. Savitz, Nathan D. Shapiro, George E. Sokolsky, Maurice Tishman, and Ascher M. Yager.

== Activities ==
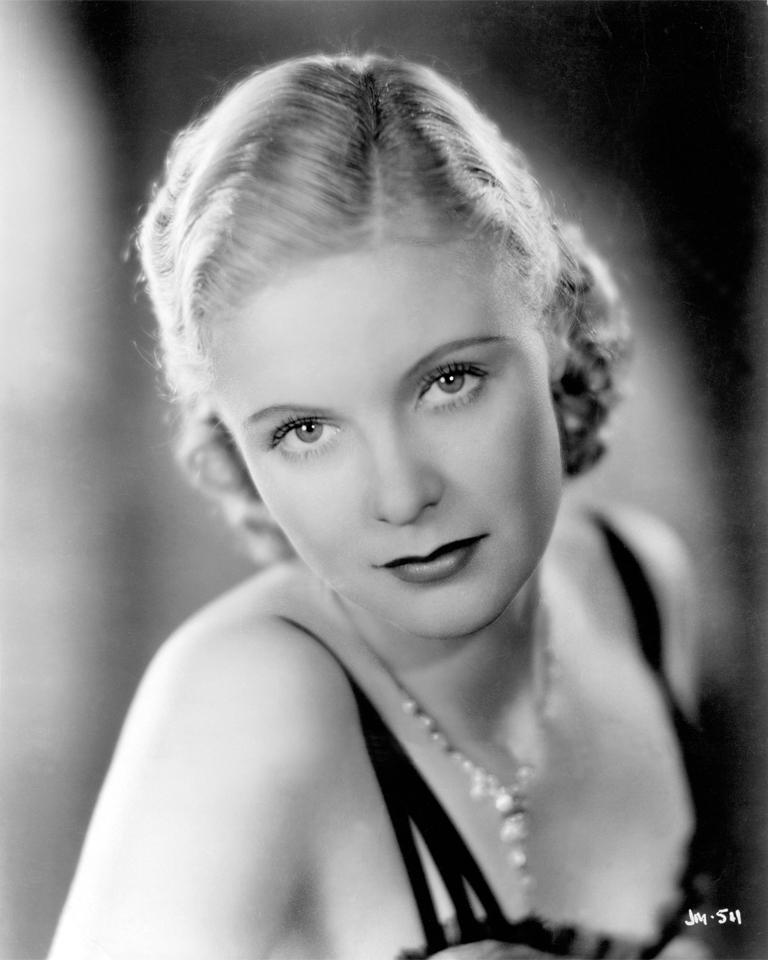
Actor Jean Muir (here, in a Warner Bros. publicity portrait) came under attack by the committee

In 1950, the Joint Committee Against Communism called on the New York Board of Education to ban the New York City Teachers Union (TU), which since the 1930s come under the control of the Communist Party USA. (Former TU vice president Dr. Bella Dodd would testify before Congress about Communist control of the TU later in the 1950s.) That same year, the committee helped keep actress Jean Muir banned from radio, soon after her name had appeared in Red Channels. Also in that year, the committee scared Bing Crosby away from recording the song "Old Man Atom", written by Vern Partlow of the Los Angeles Daily News and finally recorded by Sam Hinton. (The song's lyrics included the lines, "Einstein's scared, and when Einstein's scared, I'm scared.") Partlow was a member of People's Songs, a left-wing publisher based in New York City and founded by folk-singer Pete Seeger.

In 1951, Schultz attacked the reputation of Fleet Admiral Chester W. Nimitz and US Secretary of Defense General George C. Marshall. That same year, conservative journalist Westbrook Pegler wrote a supportive syndicated article called "Let Me Introduce Rabbi Benjamin Schultz."

In 1952, the committee honored US Senator Joseph McCarthy with a dinner at the Astor Hotel. That same year, the committee named 18 college professors as "politically objectionable" and called for legislation against them; the committee declared that "it is up to the professors to prove their fitness to teach in the face of its accusations." In a speech in Lansing, Michigan, Schulz denounced both former First Lady Eleanor Roosevelt and Americans for Democratic Action (ADA), a group she supported and which he called "an organizational extension of that lady's personality... more dangerous than Communism."

By 1953, the committee's original members in AJLAC had become known among leading Jewish "anti-Reds" and included: Eugene Lyons, Isaac Don Levine, David Lawrence, George Sokolsky, Benjamin Mandel, Barney Balaban, Rabbi Ben Schultz, Maurice Tishman, and Victor Riesel.

In 1954, the committee honored Roy Cohn with a dinner at the Astor Hotel; US Senator Joseph McCarthy was the principal speaker at the dinner. Also in 1954, Rabbi Schultz spoke before an American Legion gathering in Boston.

In 1955, the committee honored Myers Lowman for exposing communist influence. AJLAC honored Ruth Shipley with an award for "a lifetime of service to the American people."

== Legacy ==
In 1950, TIME magazine lumped the Joint Committee Against Communism and its founder Benjamin Schultz with the newsletter Counterattack and its founder Theodore Kirkpatrick.

It was the committee's 1952 attack on actress Jean Muir that first brought it to public attention.

== Works ==
- Soviet Russia and Jews (undated pamphlet) (AJLAC)

== See also ==
- Mundt-Nixon Bill
- Alfred Kohlberg
- Counterattack (newsletter)
- Red Channels: The Report of Communist Influence in Radio and Television
- Plain Talk
- Anti-communism
