= Sokolsky =

Sokolsky or Sokolski may refer to:

== Places ==
- Sokółka County (powiat sokólski), an administrative division of Poland
- Sokolska planina, a mountain in Serbia
- Sokolski Monastery, a Bulgarian Orthodox monastery
- Sokolsky District, several districts in Russia
- Sokolsky (inhabited locality) (Sokolskaya, Sokolskoye), several inhabited localities in Russia
- Sokolsky Urban Okrug, a municipal formation of Nizhny Novgorod Oblast, Russia, which Sokolsky District is incorporated as

== Other ==
- Sokolski horse, a breed of horse
- Sokolsky (surname), including a list of people with the name
- Sokolsky Opening, an uncommon chess opening

== See also ==
- Sokol (disambiguation)
