= The Freeman (magazine) =

Defunct American libertarian magazine

- Categories: Classical liberalism
- Publisher: Foundation for Economic Education
- First issue: October 2, 1950
- Final issue Number: Fall 2016
- Country: United States
- Language: English
- ISSN: 1559-1638

The Freeman (formerly published as The Freeman: Ideas on Liberty or Ideas on Liberty) is an American libertarian magazine published by the Foundation for Economic Education (FEE). It was founded as a print magazine in 1950 by John Chamberlain, Henry Hazlitt, and Suzanne La Follette. The magazine was purchased by a FEE-owned company in 1954, and FEE took over direct control of the magazine in 1956.

In September 2016, FEE announced it would end print publication of The Freeman. It was relaunched on Substack as a digital magazine in June 2025.

== Background ==
A number of earlier publications had used the Freeman name, some of which were intellectual predecessors to the magazine founded in 1950.

=== The Freeman (1920–1924) ===
From 1920 to 1924, Albert Jay Nock, a libertarian author and social critic, edited a weekly magazine called The Freeman. Nock's magazine was funded by co-editor Francis Neilson, a British author and former member of Parliament, and his wife Helen Swift Neilson, who was heir to a meatpacking fortune. The Neilsons had previously provided funding to The Nation when Nock was a writer there. Nock got fellow Nation writer Suzanne La Follette to join his new venture as an assistant editor, with Walter Fuller (the husband of Crystal Eastman) as managing editor. Other contributors included Conrad Aiken, Charles A. Beard, William Henry Chamberlin, John Dos Passos, Thomas Mann, Lewis Mumford, Bertrand Russell, Carl Sandburg, Lincoln Steffens, Louis Untermeyer, and Thorstein Veblen. La Follette revived the periodical as The New Freeman in March 1930, but the revival was discontinued a year later.

=== The Freeman (1937–1942) ===
In 1937, Frank Chodorov began another magazine called The Freeman, this time a monthly magazine promoting the philosophy of Henry George and published by the Henry George School of Social Science. It was explicitly not a revival of Nock's magazine, but Nock was an occasional contributor. In 1942, Chodorov was dismissed by the Henry George School over political differences, primarily that Chodorov remained openly critical of the political act of war, and in 1943 the magazine was renamed the Henry George News.

In 1939, Leonard Read, then a manager for the Los Angeles Chamber of Commerce, created a small publishing house called Pamphleteers, Inc., for the purpose of publishing pro-liberty works, starting with Give Me Liberty by Rose Wilder Lane. Pamphleteers used "The Freeman" as the overall name of their book series.

== Early years ==
The new magazine to be called The Freeman was founded in 1950 through the efforts of John Chamberlain, Henry Hazlitt, and Isaac Don Levine. Chamberlain and Hazlitt wrote for the anti-communist magazine Plain Talk, where Levine was editor. All three were dissatisfied with the negative approach of opposing communism and wanted a project that would spread a more positive message. They pulled together $200,000 in funding with help from textile importer Alfred Kohlberg (one of the funders of Plain Talk), DuPont executive Jasper Crane, Sun Oil president J. Howard Pew, and former United States President Herbert Hoover. Levine dropped out before publication began, so Chamberlain and Hazlitt brought in La Follette, who had worked on Nock's Freeman and also at Plain Talk. The board of the new publication included advertising executive Lawrence Fertig, legal scholar Roscoe Pound, and economists Ludwig von Mises and Leo Wolman. Also on the board was Read, who in 1946 had founded the Foundation for Economic Education.

The magazine launched in October 1950 with 6,000 subscribers, mostly brought over from Plain Talk, which had ceased publication that May. It was expected to be a for-profit operation, and by 1952 it had reached 22,000 subscribers and was almost able to sustain itself. However, internal disagreements over politics destabilized the operation. Chamberlain and La Follette had staked out positions in favor of Senator Joseph McCarthy, a strident crusader against communism, and Senator Robert A. Taft, a candidate in the Republican presidential primary that year. These positions led to conflicts with Hazlitt and members of the board. Hazlitt quit the magazine in October 1952, but by February 1953 both Chamberlain and La Follette had left, and Hazlitt returned as sole editor. He resigned again at the start of 1954.

== Transfer to FEE ==
By June 1954 the magazine had lost $400,000 and was on the verge of closure. Rather than let it fold, Read decided to purchase the magazine. He created a new for-profit company, Irvington Press, with FEE as its owner, and Irvington purchased The Freeman. He brought in Chodorov, former editor of the unrelated Georgist Freeman, as the new editor, starting with the July 1954 issue. Chodorov focused the magazine more on economic issues, taking more explicit libertarian stances than the previous editors. He also promoted a non-interventionist foreign policy, which stirred debate with more traditional conservatives. Although the content was different, the magazine continued to lose money, costing $90,000 in 18 months.

Unable to stop the magazine from losing money, Read turned it over to the non-profit FEE. It became the foundation's primary outreach tool. With a new format and a new focus, the magazine became more successful. Within two years it had reached 42,000 subscribers, and FEE's donor base had more than doubled.

== Name ==
In 1955, FEE introduced a quarterly magazine called Ideas on Liberty. When FEE acquired The Freeman, the two were merged and named The Freeman: Ideas on Liberty. In January 2000, the magazine was renamed Ideas on Liberty, although it retained the format and content that it had had since the merger. The dual title was restored with the December 2003 issue. From the October 2012 issue, the magazine was titled just The Freeman, with no subtitle. In fall 2015, FEE removed the Freeman branding from its web articles, and the Freeman referred exclusively to the then-quarterly print magazine.

== Influence ==
The Freeman is widely considered to be an important forerunner to the conservative publication National Review magazine, which was founded in 1955, and which from its inception included many of the same contributing editors.

During its more than half century of publication, The Freeman featured articles by economists, businessmen, professors, teachers, statesmen (domestic and foreign), students, housewives, free-lance writers, and budding libertarian intellectuals. Many of its authors went on to become noted authors, teachers, and founders of libertarian organizations.

== Staff ==
The editors of The Freeman have included Hazlitt, Chamberlain, La Follette, Chodorov, Paul L. Poirot, Brian Summers, Charles Hamilton, and John Robbins. Chamberlain became FEE's regular book reviewer and his reviews appeared in The Freeman until his death in 1995. As FEE president, Read was also a regular contributor, as was FEE's economic adviser, Ludwig von Mises. Other contributors in the 1950s included: Barbara Branden, James Burnham, John Dos Passos, Max Eastman, John T. Flynn, F. A. Hayek, Frank Meyer, Raymond Moley, Roscoe Pound, Wilhelm Röpke, Murray Rothbard, Morrie Ryskind and George Sokolsky.

Writers whose work appeared in The Freeman in its final decades included such libertarians as Charles W. Baird, Donald J. Boudreaux, Clarence Carson, Stephen Davies, Richard Epstein, Burton Folsom, Jr., David R. Henderson, Robert Higgs, David Kelley, Tibor Machan, Wendy McElroy, Lawrence W. Reed, George Reisman, Hans Sennholz, Bernard Siegan, John Stossel, George Leef, Thomas Szasz and Walter E. Williams.

On October 15, 2012, FEE announced that Max Borders was taking over as editor, replacing Sheldon Richman, who had been editor since 1997. On September 25, 2015, Borders resigned as editor, and managing editor B.K. Marcus succeeded him as the final editor of The Freeman. In September 2016, FEE announced that it would cease publication of The Freeman.

=== Editors ===
The Freeman had the following editors (some spans overlap due to co-editorship):

- John Chamberlain, October 1950–February 1953
- Suzanne La Follette, October 1950–February 1953
- Forrest Davis, May 1952–February 1953
- Henry Hazlitt, October 1950–October 1952, February 1953–January 1954
- Florence Norton, February 1953–June 1954
- Frank Chodorov, July 1954–December 1955
- Paul Poirot, January 1956–October 1985
- Charles H. Hamilton, November 1985–February 1986
- John W. Robbins, July 1982–December 1993, July 1992–January 1994
- Beth Hoffman, January 1986–June 1992, March 1994–November 1997
- Brian Summers, January 1986–May 1992
- Sheldon Richman, December 1997–October 2012
- Max Borders, October 2012–September 2015
- B.K. Marcus, September 2015–September 2016
