= Sokolsky (inhabited locality) =

Sokolsky (Russian: Соко́льский; masculine), Sokolskaya (Соко́льская; feminine), or Sokolskoye (Соко́льское; neuter) is the name of several inhabited localities in Russia.

Urban localities

- Sokolskoye, Nizhny Novgorod Oblast, a work settlement in Sokolsky District of Nizhny Novgorod Oblast

Rural localities

- Sokolsky (rural locality), a settlement in Bugulminsky District of the Republic of Tatarstan
- Sokolskoye, Ivanovo Oblast, a selo in Lukhsky District of Ivanovo Oblast
- Sokolskoye, Kostroma Oblast, a village in Nikolo-Makarovskoye Settlement of Makaryevsky District of Kostroma Oblast
