= Sokolsky District =

Location of Nizhny Novgorod Oblast in Russia

Location of Vologda Oblast in Russia

Sokolsky District is the name of two administrative and municipal districts in Russia:

- Sokolsky District, Nizhny Novgorod Oblast, an administrative district of Nizhny Novgorod Oblast
- Sokolsky District, Vologda Oblast, an administrative and municipal district of Vologda Oblast

== See also ==
- Sokolsky (disambiguation)
