= Isaac Don Levine =

American journalist and author (1892–1981)

Isaac Don Levine (January 19, 1892 – February 15, 1981) was a 20th-century Russian-born American journalist and anticommunist writer, who is known as a specialist on the Soviet Union.

He worked with Soviet ex-spy Walter Krivitsky in a 1939 expose of Stalin's purges and other terrorism in the Soviet Union. Later he worked with Whittaker Chambers, a defector from the American Communist Party, to reveal agents in the United States government.

== Background ==
Levine was born in 1892 in Mazyr (then "Mozyr"), Belarus, into a Zionist Jewish family. He immigrated to the United States in 1911, where he learned English. He finished high school in Missouri.

== Career ==
Levine found work with The Kansas City Star and later The New York Tribune, for which he covered the revolution of 1917. He would return to Russia in the early 1920s to cover the Civil War for The Chicago Daily News.

He was in Boston to cover the Sacco and Vanzetti trials in the early 1920s, during which he formed the Citizens National Committee for Sacco and Vanzetti. "His experience there was one of the factors that eventually turned him against the [Communist] Party and toward a career exposing the KGB's espionage activities in America and Europe."

Levine worked as a columnist through the late 1920s and 1930s for the Hearst papers.

In the spring of 1939, Levine collaborated with Walter Krivitsky, a defector from the Soviet intelligence agency KGB, for a series of articles in the Saturday Evening Post. Together they exposed the horrors of Stalin's regime, including the mass purges and murders of tens of thousands, and the deportation of suspected opponents to internal exile and Siberian camps. In November of the same year, the series was collected and published as a book, In Stalin's Secret Service, attributed to Krivitsky alone. (Levine's role in the writing was not revealed at the time.)

In September 1939, Levine arranged a meeting between Communist Party defector Whittaker Chambers and President Franklin D. Roosevelt's security chief, Adolf Berle. There Chambers revealed, with Levine present, a massive spying operation reaching even into the White House. He identified, among others, Alger Hiss in the State Department and, according to Levine, Harry Dexter White, the author of the Morganthau Plan, in the Treasury Department.

In his biography, the German diplomat Wolfgang Gans zu Putlitz reports on a meeting with Levine in Jamaica and shortly thereafter at Levine's residence in Connecticut in mid-1941, which had been about a book about von Putlitz's experiences as an employee of the British secret service, but which did not materialize because Levine was only interested in a "fantasized sensational story".

From 1946 to 1950, Levine edited the anticommunist magazine Plain Talk, financed by Alfred Kohlberg. He also joined the board of the American China Policy Association, whose chairman was Kohlberg.

In March 1948, Levine joined the American Jewish League Against Communism (AJLAC). On December 9, 1948, Levine provided testimony to the House Un-American Activities Committee in the Alger Hiss case, regarding Communist espionage in the US government. AJLAC helped form the Joint Committee Against Communism, and Levine was known to be a board member of the latter in 1954. (Kohlberg helped finance both AJLAC and the joint committee.)

He declined to join The Freeman magazine. He did work for a time with Radio Free Europe in West Germany instead. There, he co-founded the American Committee for the Liberation of the Peoples of Russia, based in Munich.

== Personal life and death ==
Levine married and had a son with his first wife, Robert Don Levine (November 15, 1924 – July 21, 2013), who became a press officer for the US Treasury. He later married again, to a woman named Ruth Newman.

Levine died on February 15, 1981, at age 89, in his home in Venice, Florida.

== Representation in other media ==
Levine appeared as himself, in a cameo as one of the witnesses to the John Reed era, in the movie Reds (1981).

Levine is featured briefly in Walter Isaacson's documentary Einstein: His Life and Universe (2007). He and Albert Einstein were friends, but they eventually fell out over their political differences.

== Works ==
Books written by Levine himself:

- Russian Revolution (1917)
- Resurrected nations; short histories of the peoples freed by the great war and statements of their national claims (1919)
- Man Lenin (1924)
- Stalin (1931)
  - Stalin, der Mann von Stahl (1931)
- Red Smoke (1932)
- Mitchell, pioneer of air power (1943, 1958, 1972)
- Stalin's Great Secret (1956)
- The Mind of an Assassin (1959, 1960, 1979)
- I Rediscover Russia (1964)
- Intervention (1969)
- Eyewitness to History (1973)
- Hands off the Panama Canal (1976)

Books written in collaboration:

- Maria Botchkareva, Yashka: My Life as Peasant, Exile, and Soldier (1919)
- Kaiser William II, Letters from the Kaiser to the Czar, copied from government archives in Moscow unpublished before 1920 (1920)
- Vladimir Zenzinov, Road to oblivion (1931)
- Plain Talk: an anthology from the leading anti-Communist magazine of the 40s (1976)

Articles edited or written by Levine:

- Plain Talk (1946–1949)
- "GULAG"–Slavery, Inc. (map) (1947)

Levine also wrote the screenplay for the biographical movie Jack London (1943).

== See also ==
- Joint Committee Against Communism
- Plain Talk
- Alfred Kohlberg
- Walter Krivitsky
