= Joseph C. Keeley =

- Born: Joseph Charles Keeley; August 10, 1907; Wilkes-Barre, Pennsylvania, US
- Died: April 1, 1994 (aged 86)
- Education: Columbia University
- Occupations: public relations, author, editor
- Employer: American Legion magazine
- Organization: American Legion
- Known for: editor of American Legion magazine (1949-1963)
- Notable work: The China Lobby Man (1969)

Joseph C. Keeley (1907–1994) was an American public relations expert who became editor of American Legion magazine (1949-1963) and wrote a biography of Alfred Kohlberg called The China Lobby Man in 1969.

== Background ==
Joseph Charles Keeley was born on August 10, 1907, in Wilkes-Barre, Pennsylvania, the son of William T. and Martha C. Keeley; he had two brothers. In 1930, Keeley graduated from Columbia University.

== Career ==
Initially, Keeley went into public relations with clients like Ford Motor Company, Kellogg, Union Carbide, and National Dairy.

In 1944-1945, Keeley served as a staff sergeant in the United States Marine Corps.

After the war, he joined the staff of American Legion magazine, of which he served as editor from 1949 to 1963. He also contributed to the Saturday Evening Post, Catholic Digest, Reader's Digest, The American Home, and Coronet (magazine) magazines.

== Personal life and death ==
Keeley married Helen Kline; they had two children.

Keeley died age 86 on April 1, 1994.

== Works ==
Books: Keeley's work includes a biography of Alfred Kohlberg:

- They sold themselves; a practical guide to personal achievement with Howard Stephenson (1937)
- Making inventions pay; a practical guide to selling, protecting, manufacturing, and marketing your inventions (1950)
- Taking it easy with your camera (1957)
- The China Lobby Man: The Story of Alfred Kohlberg (1969)
- Left-leaning antenna; political bias in television (1971)

The China Lobby Man had extensive appendices, of which Appendix G listed individuals with ties to both IPR and Communism, including: Solomon Adler, James S. Allen (AKA Sol Auerbach), Joseph Fels Barnes, T.A. Bisson, Edward C. Carter, Frank Coe, Lauchlin Currie, Len De Caux, Laurence Duggan, Israel Epstein, John K. Fairbank, Frederick V. Field, Alger Hiss, Philip Jaffe, Corliss Lamont, Owen Lattimore, William Marx Mandel, Hotsumi Ozaki, Lee Pressman, Andrew Roth, John S. Service, Agnes Smedley, Edgar Snow, Guenther Stein, Anna Louise Strong, Mary Van Kleeck, John Carter Vincent, Harry Dexter White, and Ella Winter.

Articles:

- Articles in American Legion magazine
- "Myths About Secret Inventions," Coronet magazine (1953)

== Legacy ==
Keeley's papers, archived at the Hoover Institution, include "letters, memoranda, and circulated material, prepared by Alfred Kohlberg, 1944, relating to alleged communist influence in the Institute of Pacific Relations."
