= Sokolsky (surname) =

Sokolsky or Sokolski (masculine) or Sokolskaya (feminine) is a Slavic last name. The neuter form is Sokolskoye.

Notable people with the name include:

- Alexey Sokolsky (1908–1969), Ukrainian-Belarusian chess player and chess theoretician
- Gennady Sokolsky (1937–2014), Soviet animation film director
- George Sokolsky (1893–1962), American journalist
- Grigory Sokolsky (1807–1886), Russian doctor
- Joseph Sokolsky (1786–1879), Bulgarian priest
- Konstantin Sokolsky (1904–1991), Russian singer
- Melvin Sokolsky (1933–2022), American photographer and film director
- Michael Sokolski (1926 – 2012), Polish-born American design engineer
- Nikolay Smirnov-Sokolsky (1898–1962), Soviet actor and People's Artist of the USSR
- Pierre Sokolsky (born 1946), American physicist
