= Guenther Reinhardt =

German-American writer (1904–1968)

- Born: Günther Reinhardt; December 13, 1904; Mannheim, Germany
- Died: December 2, 1968 (aged 63); New York City, US
- Citizenship: American
- Education: Heidelberg University
- Occupations: journalist, writer, investigator
- Years active: 1926-1968
- Employer(s): newspapers, magazines; US Government
- Notable work: Crime Without Punishment (1952)
- Spouse: Helen I. Williams

Guenther Reinhardt (1904 – 1968) was a German-American writer and investigator, best known for his book Crime Without Punishment: The Secret Soviet Terror Against America (1952).

== Background ==
Guenther Reinhardt was born Günther Reinhardt on December 13, 1904, in Mannheim, Germany to a banking family. His parents were Dr. Philipp Victor Reinhardt and Lilli Johanna Zimmern. He attended school at the Lyceum Alpinum Zuoz in Switzerland. In 1922, he received a BA from the Royal College of Mannheim, in 1925 a BS in economics from Mannheim and an MA from Heidelberg University. Later in 1925, he began post-graduate research at Columbia University through 1927.

== Career ==
Initially, Reinhardt worked as a statistician, first at Ladenburg, Thalmann & Company in New York City (1926–1929), then as chief statistician at Toerge & Schiffer (1929–1930)—"his first job as a private investigator." In 1925, Reinhardt began contributing to Swiss newspapers. In 1932, he became a special correspondent for the McClure Newspaper Syndicate through 1938—"while still a private investigator for Wall Street banks." He ghosted a McClure's column went called "European Whirligig." (Note: With regard to the "European Whirligig," Frederick Sondern Jr., prior to serving as an editor for Reader's Digest and also writing for Brotherhood of Evil: The Mafia, was the name appearing on the McClure column, "European Whirligig.") In 1939, he joined the staff of the New York Daily News through 1940. In 1946, he was a correspondent for the International News Service. Overall, he contributed to newspaper syndicates and national magazines for more than three decades, 1932–1968. Publications include Life and Look American magazines and Der Bund Swiss newspaper. In the late 1940s, he became a contributor to Plain Talk.

=== Government investigator ===
In 1931, Reinhardt became an American citizen. In 1934, he became a consultant to the House Un-American Activities Committee (HUAC) through 1935. In 1936 or 1937, he became a special employee (codenamed "Hal Hart") of the Federal Bureau of Investigation through 1943; he infiltrated the news business and reported to FBI special agents George J. Starr and Edward A. Tamm. One of his best sources was Boston Globe reporter Gardner Jackson, who told Reinhardt (based on hearsay from Stanley Reed and Jerome Frank) that J. Edgar Hoover was a "queer." In his 1952 memoir, Reinhardt claimed that in 1941 Ludwig Lore had tipped him off about "an extremely clever operative of the Soviet espionage underground in this country," whom the FBI should visit, and "That is how Whittaker Chambers' first contact with the FBI came about!" correlated by a brief account about in Chambers' own 1952 memoir.

In 1943, Reinhardt became a research consultant the Republican National Committee through 1944. In 1944, he became a consultant to the Office of United States Company-Ordinator of Inter-American Affairs through 1945 and then with Counter Intelligence Corps, United States Forces, European Theatre of Operations through 1947. During that time, Reinhardt tried to hunt down six Hungarian SS guards who had murdered downed American airman and accused US Army officials of smuggling "Nazi gold" into the USA. In 1947, he served as expert consultant to the US Secretary of the Army through 1948. He served as an interpreter during the Nuremberg Trials (1948–9)

=== Private investigator ===
In 1949, Reinhardt became a private investigator for Bartley Crum, a San Francisco lawyer and co-publisher of the New York Star through 1959. In 1960, he worked for Silas R. Franz, a life insurance company in New York City.

David L. Robb's non-fiction book The Gumshoe and the Shrink depicts Reinhardt as a "gumshoe" who exposed Richard M. Nixon's secret meetings with psychotherapist Dr. Arnold Hutschnecker, a discovery which helped John F. Kennedy win the presidency. Robb claims that Reinhardt "set out to destroy Richard Nixon." In September 1960, Reinhardt had discovered that Nixon was seeing a "shrink" (psychotherapist) and wrote a 12-page report on Nixon's psychotherapy with Dr. Arnold Hutschenker.

In 1964, Reinhardt was arrested for stealing documents from the New York State Liquor Authority to sell to detectives who were posing as "underworld agents." By April that year, he had appeared in court 37 times already.

== Personal life and death ==
On August 5, 1937, Reinhardt married Helen I. Williams.

Reinhardt joined the Foreign Press Association (or Association of Foreign Journalists) in 1937 and National Press Club in the 1930s.

Guenther Reinhardt died age 63 on December 2, 1968, in New York City.

== Legacy ==
Ralph de Toledano, with whom Reinhardt was a long-time friend and fellow anti-communist crusader and journalist, wrote of Reinhardt in the 1950s:

Guenther Reinhardt brings to any assignment not only a wide journalistic background but a decade of top-level intelligence experience... Many of the exposes now making headlines were wrapped up in his files many years ago. Through his work with the FBI and the U.S. Counterintelligence Corps, he has amassed a tremendous knowledge of the secret world of espionage and subversion which few Americans ever glimpse. He has repeatedly broken through the security curtain of Nazi and Communist operations, both here and abroad. The story he has to tell is of vital importance to the nation.

Author David L. Robb described Reinhardt in 2012 as:

Cut from the Sam Spade school of private detecting and the One Flew Over the Cuckoo's Nest school of personal behavior, Reinhardt was a bipolar Don Quixote, a manic-depressive knight errant in search of adventure and a fast buck.

== Works ==
In his best known work, Crime Without Punishment (November 1952), Reinhardt recounts several cases related to Soviet espionage in the United States, including the death of Juliet Stuart Poyntz (for whom his major source was Ludwig Lore), Arkadi Maslow, Leon Trotsky, Otto Ruhle, Horst Berensprung, Ellen Knauff, and Karl Nierendorf. Reinhardt objected to points made by New York Times reviewer John H. Lichtbau (also a former colleague in the Counterintelligence Corps in Germany). To the criticism that Karl Nierendorf's name goes unmentioned in authoritative accounts on German communism, for example, Reinhardt retorted that of course the name did not appear openly because "I deal with secret agents."

=== Books ===
- You Americans; fifteen foreign press correspondents report their impressions of the United States and its people (1939)
- Nathan the Wise (Nathan der Weise) (1950) (translation)
- Crime Without Punishment: The Secret Soviet Terror Against America (1952)
- The Jews in Nazi Germany (same as AJC book?)
- Source Materials for Psychological Warfare

=== Articles ===
- "Invasion Prayers Are Ready," New York Times (1944)
