= Plain Talk (magazine) =

Defunct American Anti-Communist magazine

- Editor: Isaac Don Levine
- Frequency: monthly
- Founder: Isaac Don Levine, Alfred Kohlberg
- First issue: October 1946; 79 years ago
- Final issue: January 1950
- Country: United States
- Based in: New York City
- Language: English
- ISSN: 0190-4140
- OCLC: 1604676

Plain Talk was an American monthly anti-communist magazine that was published for 44 months from 1946 to 1950. Its editor-in-chief was Isaac Don Levine.

== Description ==
Plain Talk featured articles by many conservative writers of the time, including John Chamberlain, Suzanne La Follette, Eugene Lyons, George S. Schuyler, and Ralph de Toledano. The magazine was published on a monthly basis.

== History ==
In the 1970s, Levine wrote that in July 1946, Benjamin Mandel (a "guide to the mission" of the magazine), accompanied by Father John F. Cronin and Alfred Kohlberg, approached Levine at home in Norwalk, Connecticut. Kohlberg provided $25,000, a free office, and funding for five staffers.

The magazine was established in 1946, and the first issue appeared in October 1946. Its low circulation and readership levels made the magazine cease publication in May 1950. Former US President Herbert Hoover had provided some "half-hearted" funding, but it did not succeed in shoring up the magazine.

Connected to the magazine was the name Theodore Cooper Kirkpatrick, who, with fellow ex-FBI agent Kenneth M. Bierly, was implicated in "pirating" of security informants for Plain Talk magazine and soon for the Counterattack newsletter. Kirkpatrick and Bierly also used FBI information to capitalize upon their association. Kirkpatrick and Bierly joined with a third ex-FBI agent, John G. Keenan, to form "John Quincy Adams Associates" in Washington, DC, and then "American Business Consultants, Inc." in New York City, the publisher of Counterattack.

In 1950, several writers and editors from Plain Talk started to work for The Freeman, which was founded later that year and acquired the Plain Talk subscription list.

== Personnel ==
- Isaac Don Levine, editor
- John Chamberlain
- Suzanne La Follette
- Eugene Lyons
- Guenther Reinhardt
- George S. Schuyler
- Ralph de Toledano

== Works ==
An anthology of articles from the magazine was published in 1976.

- Plain Talk magazine (October 1946–May 1950)
- Plain Talk: An Anthology from the Leading Anti-Communist Magazine of the 40s (1976)

== See also ==
- Red Channels
