= John Chamberlain (journalist) =

American journalist (1903–1995)

- Born: John Rensselaer Chamberlain; October 28, 1903; New Haven, Connecticut, U.S.
- Died: April 9, 1995 (aged 91); New Haven, Connecticut, U.S.
- Education: Yale University
- Occupations: Writer; journalist; literary critic
- Employer(s): New York Times (1926–1930s); Fortune (1936–1941); Life (1941–1950); The Wall Street Journal (1950–1960); The Freeman (1946–1995); National Review (1955–1995); King Features (1960–c. 1987); Columbia University Graduate School of Journalism
- Known for: Libertarian thought
- Political party: Conservative
- Spouse: Ernestine Stodelle

John Rensselaer Chamberlain (October 28, 1903 – April 9, 1995) was an American journalist, business and economic historian, syndicated columnist, and literary critic who was dubbed "one of America's most trusted book reviewers" by the libertarian magazine The Freeman.

== Early life and education ==
Born in New Haven, Connecticut, in 1903, John Chamberlain attended the Loomis Institute in Windsor, Connecticut, and graduated from Yale University in 1925, where he was chairman of the campus humor magazine The Yale Record.

He began his career in journalism at The New York Times in 1926, serving there as both an editor and book reviewer during the 1930s. Later, he worked on the staff at Scribner's and Harper's magazines. Serving on the editorial staffs of Fortune (1936–1941) and Life (1941–1950), for a time he wrote the editorials for Life under the direction of Henry Luce, the founder of Time, Inc.

Chamberlain was a member of the Dewey Commission and a contributor to Not Guilty: the Report of the Commission of Inquiry into the Charges Made Against Leon Trotsky in the Moscow Trials (1938) by John Dewey. For most of this period, Chamberlain was, in his own words, "a New York literary liberal" involved in political causes of the Left.

He also taught journalism at the Columbia University Graduate School of Journalism, where his students included the noted journalists Marguerite Higgins, Elie Abel and Edith Efron.

== Political beliefs ==
There is nothing like a fact to kill a theory.

— John Chamberlain

In 1939, Chamberlain was among the "editorial sponsors" of the Writer's Anti-War Bureau that was formed by an informal group of journalists and publicists under the leadership of America First Committee publicity director Sidney Hertzberg. The Bureau publicized a weekly newssheet entitled Uncensored, which worked to analyze the news, expose the propaganda and hidden biases of those who advocated for foreign intervention. The newssheet appeared weekly from October 7, 1939, until its final issue on December 7, 1941.

In the early 1940s, Chamberlain moved to the intellectual Right, along with friends such as former communists Whittaker Chambers and John Dos Passos, although Chamberlain was never himself a communist. Influenced by Albert Jay Nock, he credits the writers Ayn Rand, Isabel Paterson and Rose Wilder Lane with his final "conversion" to what he called "an older American philosophy" of libertarian and conservative ideas. Along with his friends Henry Hazlitt and Max Eastman, he helped to promote the work of the Austrian economist F. A. Hayek, The Road to Serfdom, writing the "Foreword" to the first American edition of the book in 1944.

In 1946, Leonard Read of the Foundation for Economic Education established a free market magazine named The Freeman, reviving the name of a publication which had been edited by Albert J. Nock (1920–1924). Its first editors included Chamberlain, Hazlitt and Suzanne La Follette, and its contributors during Chamberlain's tenure there included James Burnham, John Dos Passos, Max Eastman, Frank Meyer, Raymond Moley, Morrie Ryskind, and the Austrian School economists Ludwig von Mises and F. A. Hayek. He joined the neoliberal Mont Pelerin Society during this period. After stepping down as editor of The Freeman, Chamberlain continued his regular column for the periodical, "A Reviewer's Notebook."

From 1950 to 1960, he was an editorial writer for The Wall Street Journal.

William F. Buckley Jr. credited Chamberlain with "changing the course of his life" by writing the "Introduction" to Buckley's first book, God and Man at Yale. Later, Chamberlain became a lifelong contributing editor for Buckley's magazine, National Review, from its founding until his death. He still occasionally differed from Buckley; for example, he praised Atlas Shrugged by Ayn Rand.

For more than twenty-five years, he wrote a syndicated column for King Features which appeared in newspapers across the US.

== Personal life ==
After his first wife died in 1954, he married Ernestine Stodelle, who had previously been married to the Russian theatrical director Theodore Komisarjevsky.

=== Death ===
Chamberlain died on April 9, 1995, in New Canaan.

== Books ==
- Farewell to Reform, Being a History of the Rise, Life and Decay of the Progressive Mind in America (1932)
- The American Stakes (1940)
- The Roots of Capitalism (1959)
- The Enterprising Americans: a Business History of the United States' (Harper & Row, 1963)
- The National Review Reader
- Freedom and Independence: The Hillsdale Story (1979)
- A Life With the Printed Word (Regnery, 1982)
- The Turnabout Years (Jameson, 1991)

== Sources ==
- Chamberlain, John (1982). A Life With the Printed Word. Chicago: Regnery Gateway. p. 147. ISBN 0895266563.
- Diggins, John P., Up From Communism, Harper & Row, 1975.
- Chamberlain, John (March 1987). "Reason Interview with John Chamberlain". Reason (Interview). Interviewed by Kauffman, Bill.
- Opitz, Edmund A. (June 1995). "A Reviewer Remembered: John Chamberlain 1903–1995". The Freeman. Vol. 45, no. 6..
- "John Chamberlain, Columnist, Dies at 91". New York Times. 13 April 1995.
- Mark Christopher Carnes (2002). American National Biography: Supplement. Vol. 2. Oxford: Oxford University Press. p. 84. ISBN 978-0-1952-2202-9.
