= Sokolskoye, Nizhny Novgorod Oblast =

Sokolskoye Сокольское
- Urban-type settlement
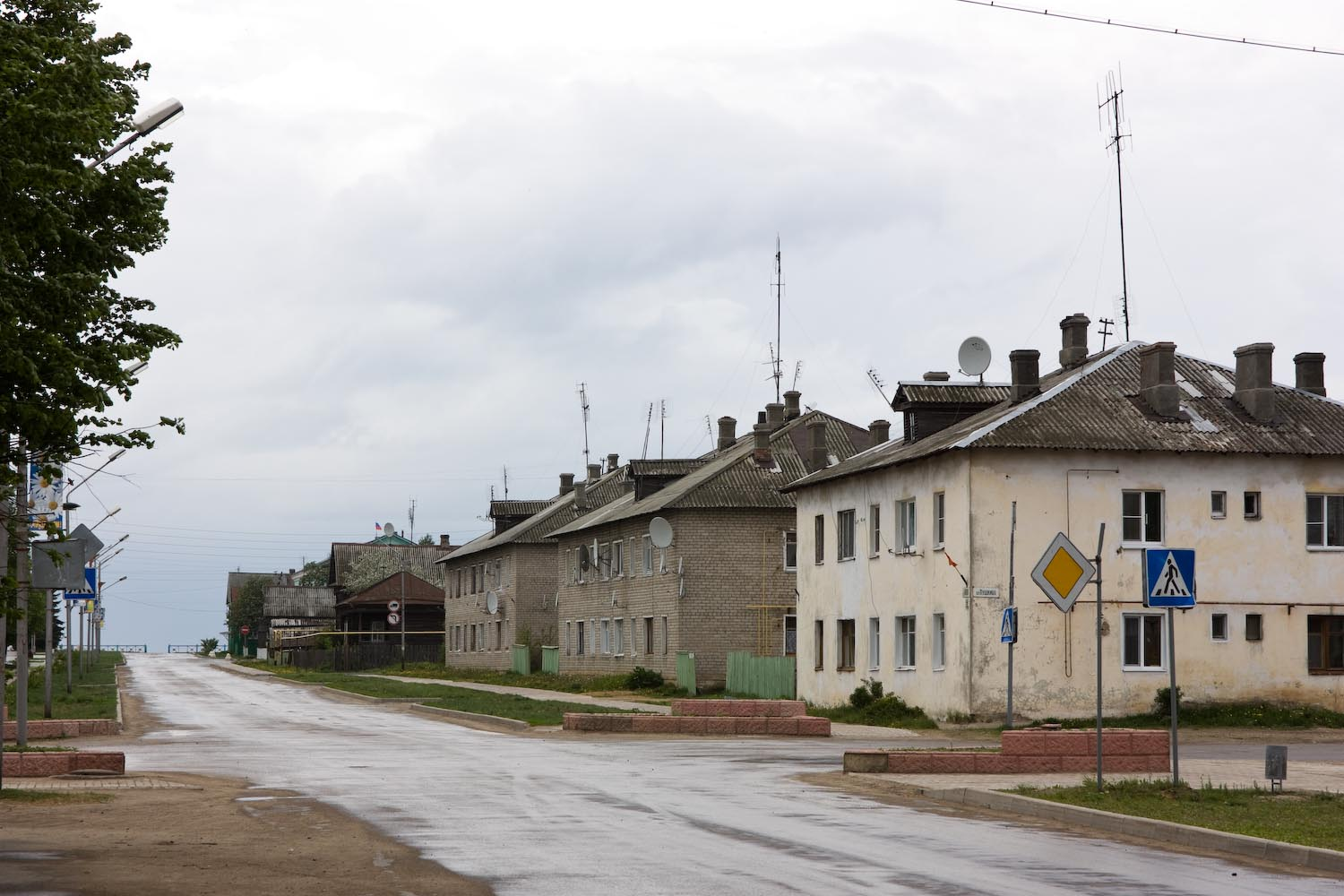
- Interactive map of Sokolskoye
- Location of Sokolskoye Sokolskoye (Nizhny Novgorod Oblast)
- Coordinates: 57.1429°N 43.1640°E
- Country: Russia
- Federal subject: Nizhny Novgorod Oblast
- Administrative district: Sokolsky District
- Founded: 1888

Population (2010 Census)
  - Total: 6,344
  - Estimate (2025): 5,845 (−7.9%)
- Time zone: UTC+3 (MSK)
- Postal code: 606670
- OKTMO ID: 22749000051

Sokolskoye (Russian: Соко́льское) is an urban locality (an urban-type settlement) in Sokolsky District of Nizhny Novgorod Oblast, Russia. Population: 6,344 (2010 census); 6,683 (2002 census); 7,222 (1989 Soviet census).
