= Günther Stein =

German journalist

Günther Stein or Gunther Stein was a German print journalist.

Stein was a foreign correspondent in China for the Manchester Guardian, The Christian Science Monitor, and the Associated Press. He was later accused of communist sympathies and spying.

Erwin Canham, editor of the Monitor during this period, wrote later of Stein's brief contribution to the paper from Japan and China which ended in 1945. He refers to later reports of Stein working for the Soviet Union while in Japan and an alleged connection with the Sorge spy ring. He refers to Stein as "enigmatic" and agrees with General Charles A. Willoughby saying that Stein was a "man about whom too little is known."

Senator Joseph McCarthy later accused Stein of spying for China during the Red Scare, as part of the Sorge spy ring.

Ralph de Toledano wrote that in 1942 the Institute of Pacific Relations invited Stein to become its Chongqing correspondent, from where he wrote books and articles to convey the idea that the Chinese Communists were "a superlative breed of idealists."

== Bibliography ==
- Made in Japan, Methuen, 1935, 206 pages
- Far East in Ferment, Methuen, 1936, 244 pages
- Chungking Considers the Future, American Institute of Pacific Relations, 11 pages, 1942
- The Challenge of Red China, Da Capo Press, 1945, 490 pages (ISBN 0306707365)
- American Business With East Asia: A study of economic relations between the United States and East Asia, 1946-1947., American Institute of Pacific Relations, 1947
- The World the Dollar Built, D. Dobson, 1952, 288 pages
