= Sokolskoye, Ivanovo Oblast =

Sokolskoye Сокольское
- Village
- Location within Ivanovo Oblast Location within Russia
- Coordinates: 57°05′N 42°15′E
- Country: Russia
- Region: Ivanovo Oblast
- District: Lukhsky District
- Time zone: UTC+3:00

Sokolskoye (Russian: Сокольское) is a rural locality (a selo) in Lukhsky District, Ivanovo Oblast, Russia. Population: 18 (2010 census);

== Geography ==
This rural locality is located 9 kilometres (5.6 mi) from Lukh (the district's administrative centre), 79 kilometres (49 mi) from Ivanovo (capital of Ivanovo Oblast) and 317 kilometres (197 mi) from Moscow. Purkovo is the nearest rural locality.
