= Raymond Moley =

American presidential adviser, professor of law and author

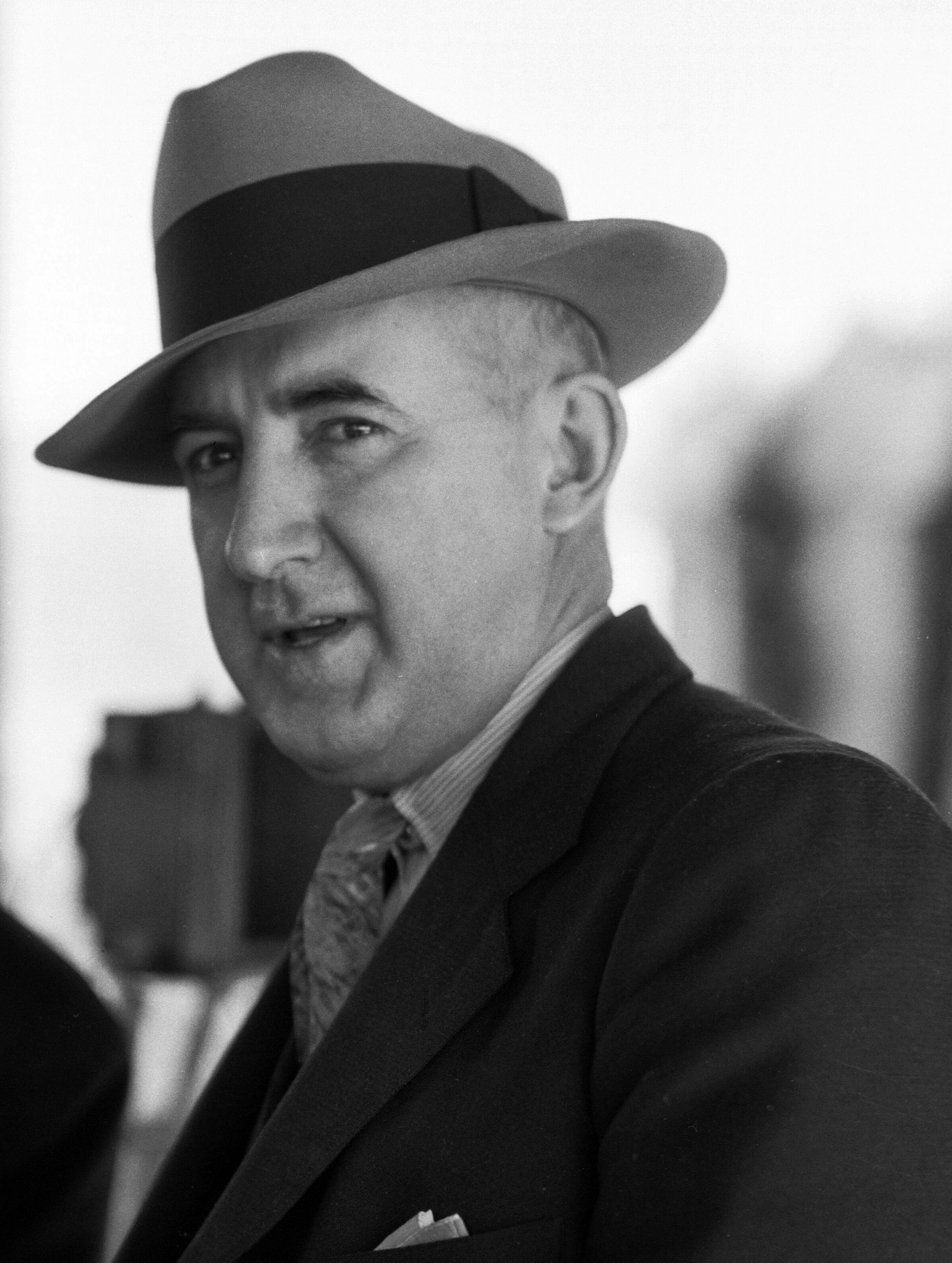
- Moley in 1933
- Born: Raymond Charles Moley; September 27, 1886; Berea, Ohio
- Died: February 18, 1975 (age 88); Phoenix, Arizona
- Occupations: Presidential adviser, professor of law, author

Raymond Charles Moley (September 27, 1886 – February 18, 1975) was an American political economist and Georgist. Initially a leading supporter of the New Deal, he later became a prominent critic.

== Early life and career ==
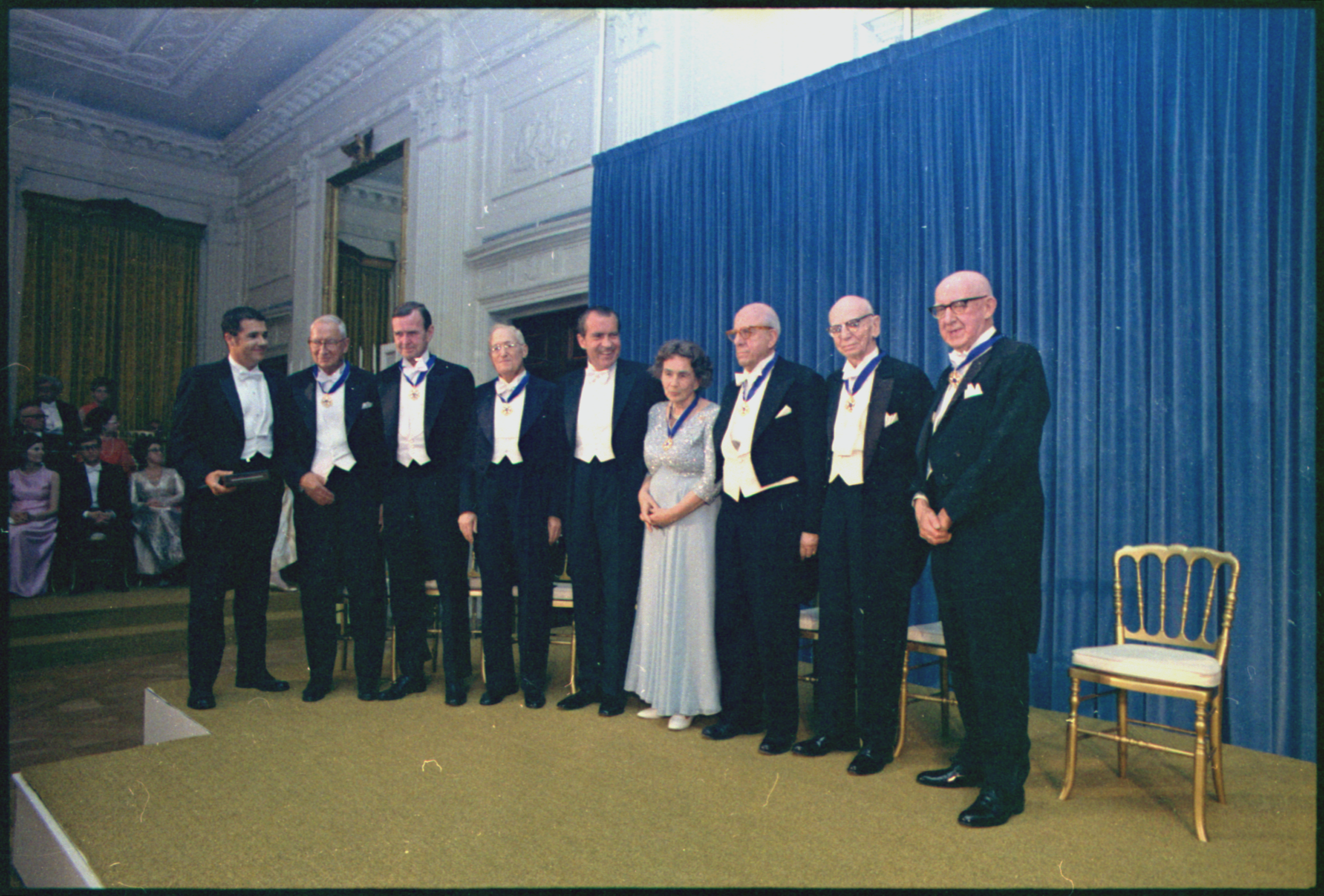
Moley (furthest right) accepts the Presidential Medal of Freedom from President Richard Nixon on April 22, 1970.

The son of Felix James and Agnes Fairchild Moley, he was educated at Baldwin-Wallace College and Oberlin College and received his PhD from Columbia University in 1918. He taught in several schools in Ohio until 1914. In 1916 he was appointed instructor and assistant professor of politics at Western Reserve University and from 1919 was director of the Cleveland Foundation. In 1918–19 he was also director of Americanization work under the Ohio State Council of Defense. He joined the Barnard College faculty in 1923, then became a professor of law at Columbia University from 1928–1954, where he was a specialist on the criminal justice system.

== Advisor to FDR ==
Moley supported then-New York Governor Franklin Roosevelt, and it was Moley who recruited fellow Columbia professors to form the original "Brain Trust" to advise Roosevelt during his presidential campaign of 1932. Despite ridicule from editorial and political cartoonists, the "Brain Trust" went to Washington and became powerful figures in Roosevelt's New Deal, with Moley writing important speeches for the president. For example, he wrote the majority of Roosevelt's first inaugural address, although he is not credited with penning the famous line, "the only thing we have to fear is fear itself." He was responsible for FDR's use of the term "the Forgotten Man" in earlier speeches. He claimed credit for inventing the term "New Deal," though its precise provenance remains open to debate. Moley also wrote various pamphlets and articles on the teaching of government. Praising the new president's first moves in March 1933, he concluded that capitalism "was saved in eight days."

== Move to the right ==
In mid-1933 Moley began his break with Roosevelt, and although he continued to write speeches for the president until 1936, he became increasingly critical of his policies, eventually becoming a conservative Republican. He wrote a column for Newsweek magazine from 1937 to 1968, and became an early contributor to the free market publication The Freeman, and, later, the nation's leading conservative periodical, National Review. In these roles, he became one of the best known critics of the New Deal and liberalism in general. Moley's After Seven Years (New York: 1939) was one of the first in-depth attacks on the New Deal. However he was also a trenchant critic of fascism, as his participation in a March 1934 mock-trial event in New York City condemning Nazi Germany, titled “The Case of Civilization Against Hitler,” indicates. It was attended by 20,000 New Yorkers and featured Mayor La Guardia, Rabbi Wise, Governor Alfred E. Smith.

Moley was awarded the Presidential Medal of Freedom by Richard Nixon on April 22, 1970.

== Publications ==
He wrote several books including:

- Lessons in Democracy (1919)
- Commercial Recreation (1919)
- Facts for Future Citizens (1922)
- After Seven Years (1939; online e-book)
- The Hays Office (1944)
- How to Keep Our Liberty (1952; online e-book)
- The First New Deal (1966)
