= Lawrence Fertig =

Advertising executive, economist (1898–1986)

Lawrence W. Fertig (1898–1986) was an American advertising executive and a libertarian journalist and economic commentator.

Fertig wrote a weekly column for the New York World-Telegram and The Sun. Fertig also wrote the 1961 Regnery Publishing offering, Prosperity Through Freedom.

He was the founder of Lawrence Fertig & Company, a New York City advertising and marketing firm. The Hoover Institution maintains an archive of Fertig's papers in Stanford, California.

His brother was New York City lawyer and New York State Assemblyman M. Maldwin Fertig.

== Education ==
After receiving an undergraduate degree from New York University, Fertig attended Columbia University, where he completed a master's degree in economics.

== Economic commentary ==
After attending the 1944 Bretton Woods conference on behalf of the Scripps-Howard newspapers, Fertig wrote a weekly syndicated column on financial and political matters and continued to do so until the closure of their New York daily, the World Journal Tribune, in 1967.

Fertig was also a member of the American Jewish League Against Communism.

== Sponsorship of Ludwig von Mises ==
Fertig, was a member of the NYU board of trustees and was instrumental in supporting his friend Ludwig von Mises when the economist fled Europe to the United States during the rise of the Third Reich. Fertig paid part of Mises' salary himself when Mises began teaching at Fertig's alma mater. Referring to Mises' visiting professorship at NYU, economist Murray Rothbard said: "NYU's support for Mises was grudging, and only came about because advertising executive and NYU alumnus Lawrence Fertig, an economic journalist and close friend of Mises and Hazlitt, exerted considerable influence at the university."

The Mises Institute, founded in 1982 in honor of Ludwig von Mises, credits Fertig as being instrumental in its creation and development. The institute offers a Lawrence Fertig memorial prize to the author whose work "best advances economic science in the Austrian tradition."
