= Red Channels =

1950 publication that spurred the Hollywood blacklist era

The May 7, 1948, issue of the Counterattack newsletter

Red Channels: The Report of Communist Influence in Radio and Television was an anti-communist document published in the United States at the start of the 1950s. Issued by the right-wing journal Counterattack on June 22, 1950, the pamphlet-style book names 151 actors, writers, musicians, broadcast journalists, and others in the context of purported Communist manipulation of the entertainment industry. Some of the 151 were already being denied employment because of their political beliefs, history, or association with suspected subversives. Red Channels effectively placed the rest on a blacklist.

== Counterattack ==
In May 1947, Alfred Kohlberg, an American textile importer and an ardent member of the anti-communist China Lobby, funded an organization, led by three former FBI agents, called American Business Consultants Inc., which issued a newsletter, Counterattack. Kohlberg was also an original national council member of the John Birch Society. A special report, Red Channels: the Report of Communist Influence in Radio and Television, was published by Counterattack in June 1950. Its declared purpose was to "expos[e] the most important aspects of Communist activity in America each week."

== Red Channels ==
The three founder members were: John G. Keenan, company president and the businessman of the trio; Kenneth M. Bierly, who would later become a consultant to Columbia Pictures; and Theodore C. Kirkpatrick, the managing editor of Counterattack and the group's spokesman. A former Army intelligence major, Francis J. McNamara, was the editor of Counterattack. The introduction to Red Channels, running just over six pages, was written by Vincent Hartnett, an employee of the Phillips H. Lord agency, an independent radio-program production house, or "packager." Hartnett would later found the anti-communist organization AWARE, Inc. (Note: (Doherty misspells Keenan's name "Keegan"); Miller (1971 [1952]), pp. 83–84; Cogley (1971 [1956]), pp. 3, 18, 25–26; see also By Appointment; Schwartz (1999). Email correspondence with the staff of the Authentic History Center website (see Sources below) confirms, "Nowhere in the document [Red Channels] is any author credit given," but Hartnett's contribution was apparently common knowledge at the time and Cogley quotes Hartnett referring to it as "my Red Channels" (p. 18). There are many mistaken Internet claims that Red Channels was co-written by "right-wing television producer Vincent Harnett [sic]". One published text – A Charmed Life (New York: Carroll & Graf, 2005 [2004]), by Lynn Haney – makes precisely that assertion, giving no source, and its discussion of Red Channels is otherwise riddled with errors. Haney states that the tract "claimed [the 151 listees] had been members of subversive organizations before the Second World War" (p. 163); Red Channels made no such claim; in fact, it carefully avoids making any direct claims about the listees, but simply records raw data, some of it as recent as May 1950 (see, e.g., "Pete Seeger" entry, Red Channels, p. 131). Haney states that those named "had not so far been blacklisted" (A Charmed Life, ibid.). In fact, as just one example, radio professional William Sweets, named in Red Channels, had already been blacklisted for a year (see Cogley [1956], pp. 25–28; "Who's Blacklisted?"). As for Hartnett's alleged occupation as a "television producer," his name does not appear at the Internet Movie Database (IMDb.com), with its extensive record of television credits – either under the proper spelling of his name or "Harnett.") The 213-page tract, released three years after the House Un-American Activities Committee began investigating purported Communist Party influence in the entertainment field, claims to expose the spread – by means of advocacy of civil rights, academic freedom, and nuclear weapons control – of that influence, in radio and television entertainment. Referring to current television programming, the Red Channels introduction declares that

[S]everal commercially sponsored dramatic series are used as sounding boards, particularly with reference to current issues in which the Party is critically interested: "academic freedom," "civil rights," "peace," the H-bomb, etc ... With radios in most American homes and with approximately 5 million TV sets in use, the Cominform and the Communist Party USA now rely more on radio and TV than on the press and motion pictures as "belts" to transmit pro-Sovietism to the American public.

The introduction to Red Channels described how the Communist Party attracts both financial and political backing from those in the entertainment industry:

No cause which seems calculated to arouse support among people in show business is ignored: the overthrow of Francoist Spain, the fight against anti-Semitism and Jimcrow, civil rights, world peace, the outlawing of the H-Bomb, are all used. Around such pretended objectives, the hard core of Party organizers gather a swarm of "reliables" and well-intentioned "liberals," to exploit their names and their energies.

Red Channels served as a vehicle for the expansion of the entertainment industry blacklist that denied employment to a host of artists it considered sympathetic to "subversive" causes, attempted to forestall criticism by claiming that the Communist Party itself engaged in blacklisting, seeing to it that "articulate anti-communists are blacklisted and smeared with that venomous intensity which is characteristic of Red Fascists alone."

== Red Channels list ==
Red Channels listed 151 professionals in entertainment and on-air journalism whom it clearly implied were among "the Red Fascists and their sympathizers" in the broadcasting field. Each of the names is followed by a raw list of putatively telling data, with the sources of evidence varying from FBI and HUAC citations to newspaper articles culled from the mainstream press, industry trade sheets, and such Communist publications as the Daily Worker. For example, under the heading for Burgess Meredith, identified as Actor, Director, Producer – Stage, Screen, Radio, TV, the first three of a total of seven data points read:

	Reported as:
American Committee	Signer of letter. Letter, 10/23/45.
for Yugoslav Relief	Chairman, Winter Clothing Campaign.
	Letterhead. 10/23/45.
Committee for First	Signer. Advertisement in protest of Wash-
Amendment	ington hearings. Hollywood Reporter, 10/24
	47, p. 5 Un-Am. Act. in California, 1948,
	p. 210
Coordinating Com-	Representative individual. House Un-Am.
mittee to Lift the	Act. Com., Appendix 9, p. 670
Embargo Against
Spanish Loyalist
Government

== Impact ==
Jean Muir was the first performer to lose employment because of a listing in Red Channels. In 1950 Muir was named as a Communist sympathizer in the pamphlet, and was immediately removed from the cast of the television sitcom The Aldrich Family, in which she had been cast as Mrs. Aldrich. NBC had received between 20 and 30 phone calls protesting her being in the show. General Foods, the sponsor, said that it would not sponsor programs in which "controversial persons" were featured. Though the company later received thousands of calls protesting the decision, it was not reversed.

Many other well-known artists were named, including Hollywood stars such as Edward G. Robinson and Orson Welles (who by then, due to tax problems, was in Europe), literary figures such as Dorothy Parker and Lillian Hellman, and musicians such as Hazel Scott, Pete Seeger and Leonard Bernstein. Ex-leftist and HUAC informant J. B. Matthews claimed responsibility for providing the listings; he would also work for United States Senator Joseph McCarthy (R-WI). By 1951, those identified in Red Channels were blacklisted across much or all of the movie and broadcast industries unless and until they cleared their names, the customary requirement being that they testify before the House Un-American Activities Committee (HUAC) and name names, which the vast majority refused to do.

== Lawsuits ==
One libel lawsuit was filed against Red Channels, by actor Joe Julian, who charged that Red Channels was responsible for his income plummeting from $18,000 the year it was published to barely $1,500 three years later. The case was dismissed on the basis of the tract's care in not making overt claims about specific individuals and its brief disclaimer: "In screening personnel every safeguard must be used to protect genuine liberals from being unjustly labelled."

CBS radio personality John Henry Faulk also sued. Faulk was a favorite target of Hartnett, who proudly proclaimed himself a coauthor of Red Channels. In 1953, Hartnett started AWARE, Inc., an anti-communist organization with its own bulletin focused on the entertainment industry. The bulletin said that, in the 1940s, Faulk had sponsored a pro-communist peace rally, entertained at pro-communist clubs, appeared at communist front activities, and addressed a "Spotlight on [Henry] Wallace" event in "'the official training school of the Communist conspiracy in New York'" (p. 232). CBS fired Faulk a bit over a year after he filed his lawsuit. In 1962, a jury awarded Faulk $3.5 million in damages. Although the award was later reduced, the verdict marked the effective end of the blacklisting era.

== See also ==
- The Red Channels list – a tally of people named in Red Channels

== Sources ==
Print:

- Bernhard, Nancy E. U.S. Television News and Cold War Propaganda, 1947–1960. Cambridge University Press, 2003
- "By Appointment", Time, September 11, 1950 (available online, subscription required).
- Blue, Howard (2002). Words at War: World War II Era Radio and the Postwar Broadcasting Industry Blacklist. Lanham, Maryland: Scarecrow Press. ISBN 0-8108-4413-3
- Cogley, John (1956). "Report on Blacklisting." Collected in Blacklisting: An Original Anthology (1971), Merle Miller and John Cogley. New York: Arno Press/New York Times. ISBN 0-405-03579-9
- Doherty, Thomas (2003). Cold War, Cool Medium: Television, McCarthyism, and American Culture. New York: Columbia University Press. ISBN 0-231-12952-1
- Faulk, John Henry and Don Gardner. Fear on Trial (1964) University of Texas Press, 1983.
- Miller, Merle (1952). "The Judges and the Judged." Collected in Blacklisting: An Original Anthology (1971), Merle Miller and John Cogley. New York: Arno Press/New York Times. ISBN 0-405-03579-9
- Nizer, Louis. (1966). The Jury Returns. New York: Doubleday & Co. ISBN 978-067112-505-9
- "Who's Blacklisted?" Time, August 22, 1949 (available online, subscription required).
- Schrecker, Ellen (2002). The Age of McCarthyism: A Brief History with Documents. New York: Palgrave. ISBN 0-312-29425-5
- Strout, Lawrence N. (1999). Covering McCarthyism: How the Christian Science Monitor Handled Joseph R. McCarthy, 1950–1954. Westport, Conn.: Greenwood Press. ISBN 0-313-31091-2

Online (authored):

- Schwartz, Richard A. (1999). "How the Film and Television Blacklists Worked". Part of the Florida International University website.

Online (archival):

- Guide to the American Business Consultants, Inc. Counterattack: Research Files 1930–1968. – summary and inventory of document holdings in the Tamiment Library/Robert F. Wagner Labor Archives; part of the NYU–Elmer Holmes Bobst Library website
- The Cold War Home Front: Red Channels. – links to many reproduced pages of the original book; part of the Authentic History Center website
