= Counterattack (newsletter) =

Anti-communist publication (1947–1955)

Counterattack: The Newsletter of Facts on Communism
- Counterattack (May 7, 1948)
- Managing Editor: Theodore C. Kirkpatrick
- Categories: anti-communist, conservative
- Frequency: weekly
- Format: Newsletter
- Publisher: Counterattack
- Paid circulation: unknown
- Unpaid circulation: unknown
- Founder: John G. Keenan
- Founded: 1947
- First issue: May 16, 1947; 79 years ago
- Final issue: November 25, 1955
- Company: American Business Consultants, Inc. (ABC)
- Country: United States of America
- Based in: New York City
- Language: English

Counterattack was a weekly subscription-based newsletter published from 1947 to 1955, with an emphasis on anti-communist content and organizing boycotts or other actions against those who were accused of communist associations or sympathies. The mimeographed newsletter was published by American Business Consultants, a "private, independent organization" started by three former agents of the Federal Bureau of Investigation. Counterattack went into decline after a series of lawsuits by people who were named in the publication.

== Description ==
The full title of the publication was Counterattack: The Newsletter of Facts on Communism.

The newsletter was headquartered at 55 W. 42 Street, New York.

Counterattack was available by subscription, on newsstands, and in stores for one dollar in New York City. An annual subscription was $24. Its target subscribers included "Security Officers, Personnel Directors, Employment managers, and all sorts of people whose business requires them to know the facts about the background of organizations and/or individuals." By 1949, Counterattack had earned some $200,000 in revenue.

In 1952, Time magazine reported:

[Counterattack] never paid salaries of more than $6,000 a year, and it paid only a few dividends of $1 each on its 1,000 shares of stock. Its special research jobs for corporations, ad agencies, unions, etc. now account for about 5% of its income; the rest comes from Counterattack.

=== Mission ===
Its self-proclaimed "principal functions" were to

- Publish the newsletter Counterattack, expose "the most important aspects of Communist activity in America each week
- Compile factual information on Communists, Communist fronts, and other subversive organizations
- Assist, consult with, and provide factual information on Communist activities

The Columbia Journalism Review has assessed the mission of Counterattack as follows:

Counterattack had two missions: one, ostensibly journalistic, the other vigorously interventionist. First, it set out to expose everyone it could find who had any connection, however dubious or tenuous, to anything or anyone associated with Communism, Socialism, the Soviet Union, or progressive ideology. Then, more significantly, Counterattack sought to rally its subscribers to action against the individuals it targeted. In its assault on performers and production personnel in radio and television, Counterattack exhorted its readers to write protest letters to the corporate sponsors of programs featuring actors with purported links to the left.

=== Counterattack staff ===
Staff members included:

- John G. Keenan: Ex-FBI agent, publisher of Counterattack, and ABC Inc. president.
- Kenneth M. Bierly: Ex-FBI agent, ABC Inc. vice president
- Theodore C. Kirkpatrick (AKA "Ted Kirkpatrick"): Ex-FBI agent, managing editor and chief spokesperson of Counterattack (known as "Mr. Counterattack") and ABC secretary-treasurer
- Francis J. McNamara: In 1948, Francis John McNamara (1915–2007), WWII Army intelligence officer and UNRRA staffer in China, began serving as a researcher. In January 1950, he became editor of Counterattack through May 1954. In 1954, he moved to Washington, DC, where he led the National Security Program of the Veterans of Foreign Wars (VFW). He joined the House Committee on Un-American Activities [HUAC] as a research analyst [1958], director of research [1961], and staff director [1962]. In 1970, he joined the Subversive Activities Control Board (SACB) as executive secretary. In 1981, he became executive director of the Nathan Hale Foundation. In 1987, he became vice chairman of the Security and Intelligence Foundation through 1990. His last role was senior fellow at the Center for Intelligence Studies.
- Herbert Romerstein: In 1951, Romerstein testified before the Senate Sub-Committee on Internal Security on communist youth organizations and before the Subversive Activities Control Board. He became a research analyst and investigator for American Business Consultants, publishers of the anti-communist newsletter Counterattack as well as for Bookmailer, which published his first book, Communism and Your Child, in 1962. From 1965 to 1983, Romerstein served as a staff member for the U.S. House of Representatives. During this interval, Romerstein worked as an Investigator for the House Committee on Un-American Activities (HUAC), as minority chief investigator for the House Committee on Internal Security, and on the staff of the House Permanent Select Committee on Intelligence.

Edward Hunter contributed, then went on to found Tactics anti-communist newsletter in the 1960s.

=== ABC (publisher) ===
Alfred Kohlberg, an American textile importer and an ardent member of the anti-communist China Lobby, funded the group, registered as American Business Consultants, Inc. (ABC) in 1947, "an extremist group of corporate and ex-government personnel." Affiliates of ABC included Lawrence Johnson (owners of a supermarket chain in upstate New York) and Jack Wren (former Naval Intelligence officer at BBDO advertising agency). (Kohlberg was also an original national council member of the John Birch Society.)

Keenan served as ABC president, Bierly as vice president, and Kirkpatrick as secretary-treasurer.

ABC offered a service costing $5 to investigate people. Newsletter subscribers (clients) included: Bendix Aviation, Du Pont, General Motors, Metropolitan Life, R.J. Reynolds, and F.W. Woolworth.

== History ==
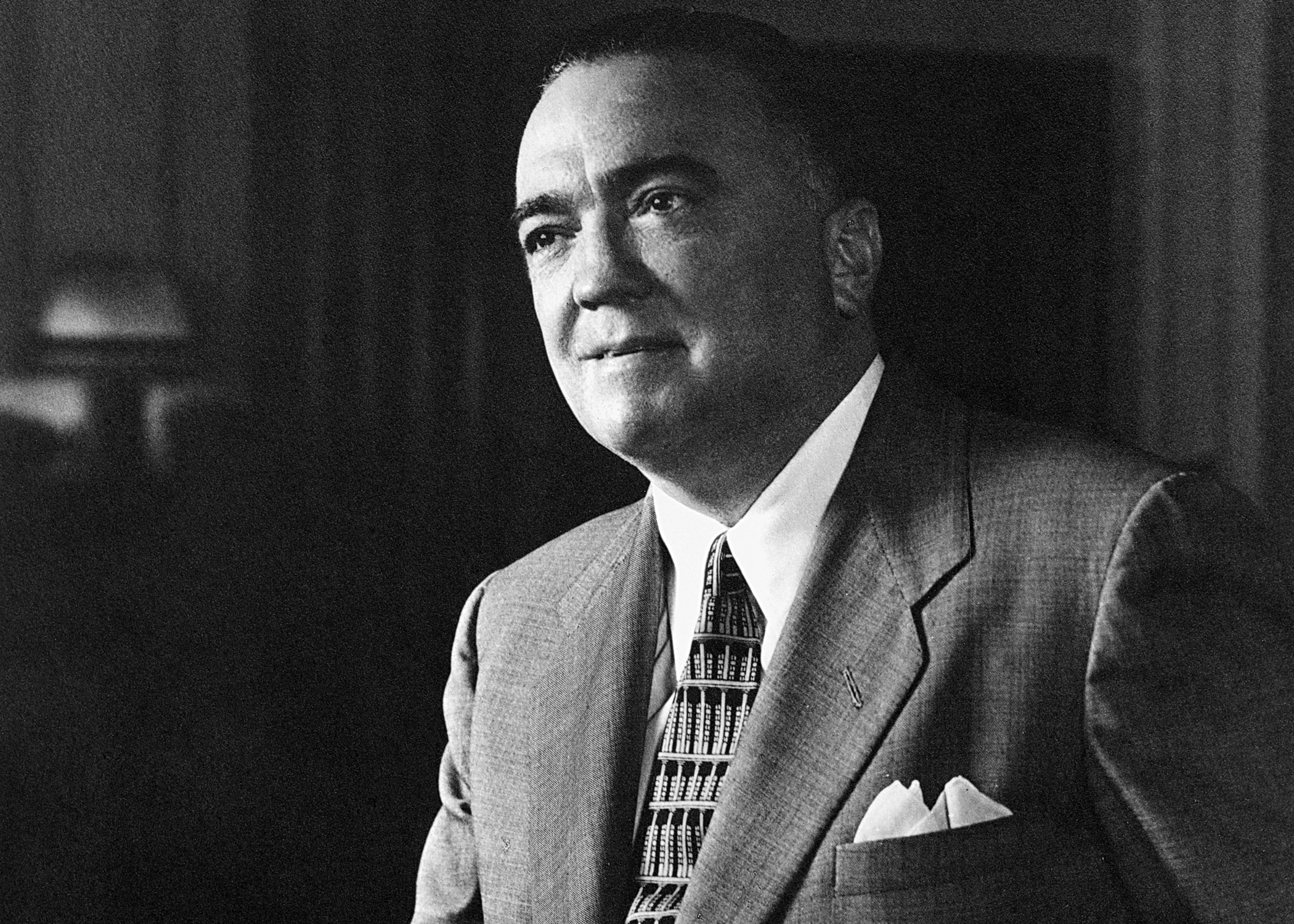
J. Edgar Hoover (1959)

In 1946, Kirkpatrick and Bierly were implicated in "pirating" of security informants for Plain Talk magazine and soon thereafter for Counterattack newsletter. Kirkpatrick and Bierly also used FBI information to capitalize upon their FBI association. Together with Keenan, they formed first "John Quincy Adams Associates" in Washington, DC, and then "American Business Consultants, Inc.", in New York City, publisher of Counterattack newsletter.

On March 26, 1947, FBI director J. Edgar Hoover appeared before the House Un-American Activities Committee (HUAC) to air his views on communism. Hoover said:

The mad march of red fascism is a cause for concern in America. But the deceit, the trickery, and the lies of the American communists are catching up with them. Whenever the spotlight of truth is focused upon them the cry, "red baiting." Now that their aims and objectives are being exposed they are creating a Committee for the Constitutional Rights of Communists, and are feverishly working to build up what they term a quarter-million-dollar defense fund to place in ads in papers, to publish pamphlets, to buy radio time. They know that today it is a fight to the finish and that their backs will soon be to the wall.
The Communist Party of the United States is a fifth column if there ever was one. It is far better organized than were the Nazis in occupied countries prior to their capitulation. They are seeking to weaken America just as they did in the era of obstruction when they were aligned with Nazis. Their goal is the overthrow of our government.

HUAC's investigations gathered momentum after Hoover's speech – and, shortly after that speech, Counterattack launched publishing.

=== Political counterattacks ===
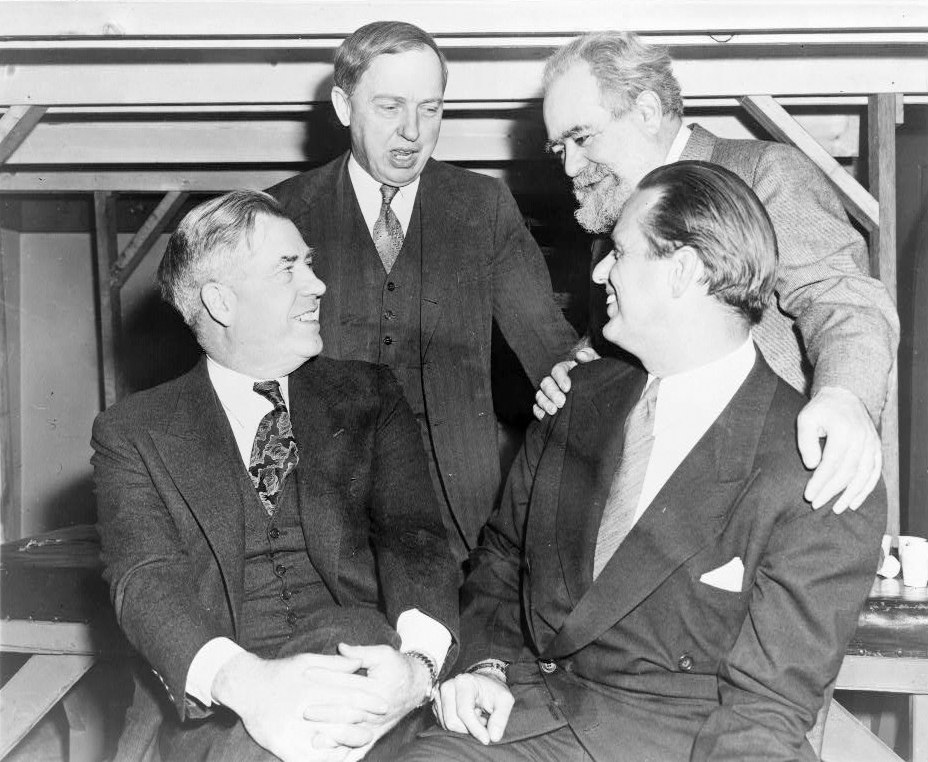
Progressive Citizens of America members (1947) supported Wallace and Progressive Party. From left are seated, Henry A. Wallace and FDR's son Elliott Roosevelt; standing are Dr. Harlow Shapley and Jo Davidson.

As early as December 1947, Counterattack had denounced the presidential aspirations of former U.S. Vice President Henry A. Wallace and his Progressive Party. It tracked other political parties that supported the Progressive Party, including the American Labor Party and the National Farmers Union. It also attacked American labor unions, particularly the Congress of Industrial Organizations (CIO) and the Amalgamated Clothing Workers of America (ACW) and their support (CIO) or not (ACW).

In late March 1948, Counterattack had started to seek to rally its readers to take action against communists and communist organizations.

In May 1948, Counterattack denounced the communist opposition to the Mundt-Nixon Bill.

On July 2, 1948, Keenan and Kirkpatrick testified before the Special Subcommittee of the U.S. House of Representatives Committee on Education and Labor. Kennan described himself as publisher of Counterattack, ABC president, and Brooklyn resident: he also noted his service as FBI an agent from 1942 to 1948. Keenan further testified that he was a lawyer and partner in the firm of Alexander and Keenan. Kirkpatrick described himself as the managing editor of Counterattack, ABC secretary-treasurer, and Queens resident: he noted his service as FBI an agent from 1941 to 1945. Kirkpatrick further testified that, after the FBI, he had worked for Macy's and then joined ABC in June 1946. They claimed to have some twelve employees, who included ex-FBI agents. Among them were Jeremiah Buckley (head of research) and Harry Morgan (former vice president of the American Communications Association-CIO union). They stated that circulation at that time ran between 1,400 and 1,500 subscribers.

In 1949, Counterattack denounced the Scientific and Cultural Conference for World Peace (July 1949) as a communist-front plot. The council was in fact founded by the Cominform and propped up by the Soviet Union.

By 1949–1950, Ed Sullivan was consulting Counterattack's Kirkpatrick for guidance on whom to avoid as a "pinko".

=== HUAC and Red Channels ===
In October 1947, the House Un-American Activities Committee (HUAC) began investigating the influence and infiltration of communism in Hollywood, which some regard as a prelude to McCarthyism and others regard as the beginning of the Second Red Scare. A period of blacklisting in the Entertainment industry began with a contempt of Congress charge against the "Hollywood Ten".

American Business Consultants were part of a larger network, that included HUAC, which researched allegedly communist-related activities of individuals and organizations. Composed of several former FBI agents, ABC obtained information from the FBI and had access to the files of HUAC.

On June 22, 1950, Counterattack published a special issue, Red Channels: The Report of Communist Influence in Radio and Television, with intent to "expos[e] the most important aspects of Communist activity in America each week."

Red Channels shook the entertainment industry. Starting in August 1950, Young & Rubicam advertising agency and its radio and television program-sponsoring client General Foods ran into "pinko" issues over The Aldrich Family and The Goldbergs.

In September 1950, Billboard magazine published an exposé "The Inside on 'Counterattack'", which promised the "full story of paper and operators", an "ex-FBI foursome".

=== Peak ===
In 1951, Bierly left the newsletter. He claimed that Counterattack had "changed into an opinion and editorial sheet—short on facts and long on opinion." He also admitted that Red Channels had led to "lots of people getting kicked around". He set up his own research outfit with Columbia Pictures as an initial client.

In 1952, Counterattack seems to have peaked at 7,500 subscribers. By late June 1952, Time magazine reported that Kirkpatrick, AKA "Mr. Counterattack", had left the newsletter for "primarily personal reasons".

=== Decline ===
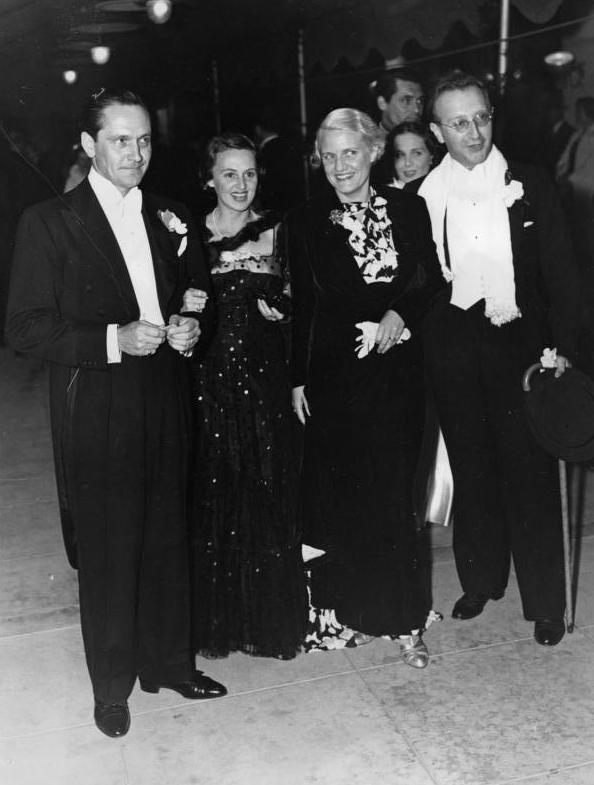
Left to right: Fredric March with wife Florence Eldridge, Helga Maria zu Löwenstein-Wertheim-Freudenberg (born Schuylenburg) with husband Hubertus Prinz zu Löwenstein-Wertheim-Freudenberg at the Premiere of Anthony Adverse in Los Angeles (July 29, 1936)

In mid-March 1948, actor Fredric March and his wife Florence Eldridge sued Counterattack for defamation and damages of $250,000. Counterattack settled with them out of court–"an expensive lesson" in libel.

The first publication whose accusation against Counterattack for "extortion-style" tactics stuck was a weekly newsletter called In Fact in an article dated July 17, 1950.

Lawsuits against Counterattack seemed to have stopped its publication by 1954, 1955, or 1958 though the organization (and ABC) seem to have survived until 1968 or even 1973.

== Archives ==
The right-wing Church League of America obtained research files from American Business Consultants.

Bloomsburg University's library has made several issues available in PDF format online.

== See also ==
- Plain Talk (magazine)
- Red Channels
- The Red Channels list
- Anti-communism
- Alfred Kohlberg
- China Lobby
- John Birch Society
- Americans Battling Communism
- Newsletter

== External sources ==
- John Cogley (1956). Report on Blacklisting: Radio-Television. Fund for the Republic.
- Bloomsburg University: Counterattack PDFs
- Stanford University: Counterattack; the newsletter of facts to combat communism
- AP Archives: (27 Mar 1947) Story 1, UN News: Communism, 200 UN V20 R25, 27 Mar 1947, b/w, sound
