= Irene Corbally Kuhn =

American journalist and author

- Kuhn in 1945
- Born: Irene Corbally; January 15, 1898; New York City, United States
- Died: December 30, 1995 (aged 97); Concord, Massachusetts
- Occupation: Journalist

Irene Corbally Kuhn (15 January 1898 – 30 December 1995) was a journalist and author, whose career spanned seven decades in five continents. She became famous in the 1920s and '30s by working as a reporter for many newspapers in the United States and China. Mrs. Kuhn was a woman of many "firsts", among others, she was the first woman to broadcast from the Orient and the first individual to broadcast from a US Navy vessel. In addition to countless columns for numerous newspapers, she also wrote a memoir, a documentary and a screen-play.

== Awards ==
- 1977: Front Page Award for best magazine feature article

== Publications ==
- With De Jaegher, Raymond J. (1952). The Enemy Within: An Eyewitness Account of the Communist Conquest of China. Garden City, NY: Doubleday.
