= Alfred Kohlberg =

American businessman and politician

Alfred Kohlberg (January 27, 1887, San Francisco, California – April 7, 1960, New York City, New York) was an American textile importer. A staunch anti-Communist, he was a member of the pro-Chiang "China lobby", as well as an ally of Wisconsin Senator Joseph McCarthy, a friend and advisor of John Birch Society founder Robert W. Welch Jr., and a member of the original national council of the John Birch Society.

== Business career ==
Kohlberg moved to New York and set up a business buying linen in Ireland which was then shipped to China, where local weavers turned the raw linen into fine textiles. The finished products were then sent to the United States where they were sold to consumers as luxury fabrics. His company, "Alfred Kohlberg, Inc.: Chinese Textiles" had its office at 1 West 37 Street, New York City.

== Political activism ==
His business interests led him to travel often to China. During one such trip in 1943, after inspecting the progress of the Chinese war effort, he became convinced that the many stories in the American press of Chiang Kai-shek's corruption were false and were being spread by communist sympathizers.

In the early 1940s, Kohlberg was a member of the American Bureau for Medical Aid to China (ABMAC) and the Institute for Pacific Relations (IPR).

=== ABMAC ===
In 1941, he served as a director for ABMAC (which received $2M annually from the United States during WWII) and traveled much of the country, after which he presented a report to ABMAC. In Spring 1943, New Deal official Lauchlin Currie advised Kohlberg of his "hopelessness" in the national government of the Republic of China under Chiang Kai-shek. In February 1943, Dwight Edwards at ABMAC Chungking cabled ABMAC New York attacking as corrupt the local partners whom Kohlberg had praised in his report. Kohlberg criticized Edwards; Edward C. Carter, head of IPR criticized Kohlberg. In July 1943, T.A. Bisson wrote an article called "China's Part in a Coalition War" in the IPR's Far Eastern Survey. Bisson described two Chinas, the first (under Chiang Kai-shek) "feudalist" and corrupt, the second (under Mao Zedong) "democratic". Bisson called those areas under the control of the Chinese Communist Party "bourgeois democracy." In June 1943, Kohlberg flew back to China to make a second report, where he met with US General Claire Chennault of the Flying Tigers and US Brigadier General T.S. Arms, both of whom expressed their continuing supporting for Chiang Kai-shek and expressed doubt about corruption in ABMAC. Returning to the States, Kohlberg filed a second report and proposed that ABMAC drop its support for United China Relief if people like Dwight Edwards were not barred from interfering. ABMAC disregarded his report and proposal, and Kohlberg resigned after a 15-year affiliation.

=== IPR ===
Upon resigning from ABMAC, he focused his attentions on IPR. Although a long-time IPR member, previously he had not read their publications closely. He did so now—also reading Communist publications like the New Masses. He noted that both IPR and the Comintern had changed policies in tandem regarding Chiang Kai-shek: from opposing him after the Hitler-Stalin Pact in 1939, to lauding him after Operation Barbarossa (1941), to opposing him again by 1943. Kohlberg began a personal campaign to have IPR acknowledge its pro-Communist bias and circulated this criticism among IPR members. Kohlberg began referring to Frederick Vanderbilt Field, a major IPR supporter, as the "millionaire communist." By 1944, Kohlberg resigned from the IPR, after "a dozen years membership," because he found it infiltrated by Communists. By October 1946, Kohlberg's court order to see IPR's reply, which it had not shared with him. In 1945, Kohlberg continued his campaign against the IPR. He consulted anti-Communist experts like journalists Nelson Frank and Max Eastman, staff on the House Un-American Activities Committee, Felix Morley and Frank Hanighen of Human Events, Freda Utley, Father Mark Tsai. Kohlberg then "bombarded" IPR with letters; he also published a biography of Owen Lattimore in China Monthly (where Utley worked). Kohlberg continued to criticize IPR and file lawsuits against it. On July 25, 1951, Kohlberg could relent, when the "McCarran Commission" (SISS) started public hearings to investigate IPR. In 1952, Kohlberg testified against IPR in those hearings. The IPR countered by calling Kohlberg a Mason and member of Fidelity Lodge No. 120 of San Francisco for decades.

Kohlberg's "long-time adversaries" at the Institute for Pacific Relations (IPR) were Owen Lattimore and Philip C. Jessup.

=== Propaganda war ===
In 1946, Kohlberg joined the American China Policy Association (ACPA), an anti-communist organization that supported the government of Republic of China under Chiang Kai-shek, as chairman. Kohlberg denied that he had set up ACPA to neither counter nor spite IPR.

The same year, he funded the magazine Plain Talk in 1946, intended to rebut the claims made by the China Hands and support the Nationalist Government of Chiang. In 1947, he funded the newsletter Counterattack. He was a co-founder of the American Jewish League Against Communism. Both organizations published pieces that decried IPR and people associated with it, e.g., Owen Lattimore.

== Personal life and death ==
Kohlberg married Jane Myers in 1921 and had two daughters and two sons. The youngest was psychologist Lawrence Kohlberg.

Kohlberg was a Bronxville neighbor of his biographer, Joseph C. Keeley, who recorded that "Kohlberg was of course annoyed at the vicious smears that were aimed at him during his lifetime."

Kolberg died on April 7, 1960, in New York City. Myers died in 1968.

In 1960, Chih-Teh Loo, the superintendent of Taipei Veterans General Hospital, proposed funding from ROC government to build the Alfred Kohlberg Memorial Medical Research Laboratory and to go along with $75,000 donation from Jane Myers. The building was built on the east side of the hospital. The inauguration ceremony was held on November 11, 1963. Both vice president Chen Cheng and Jane Myers attended the ceremony.
