= George Sokolsky =

American columnist (1893–1962)

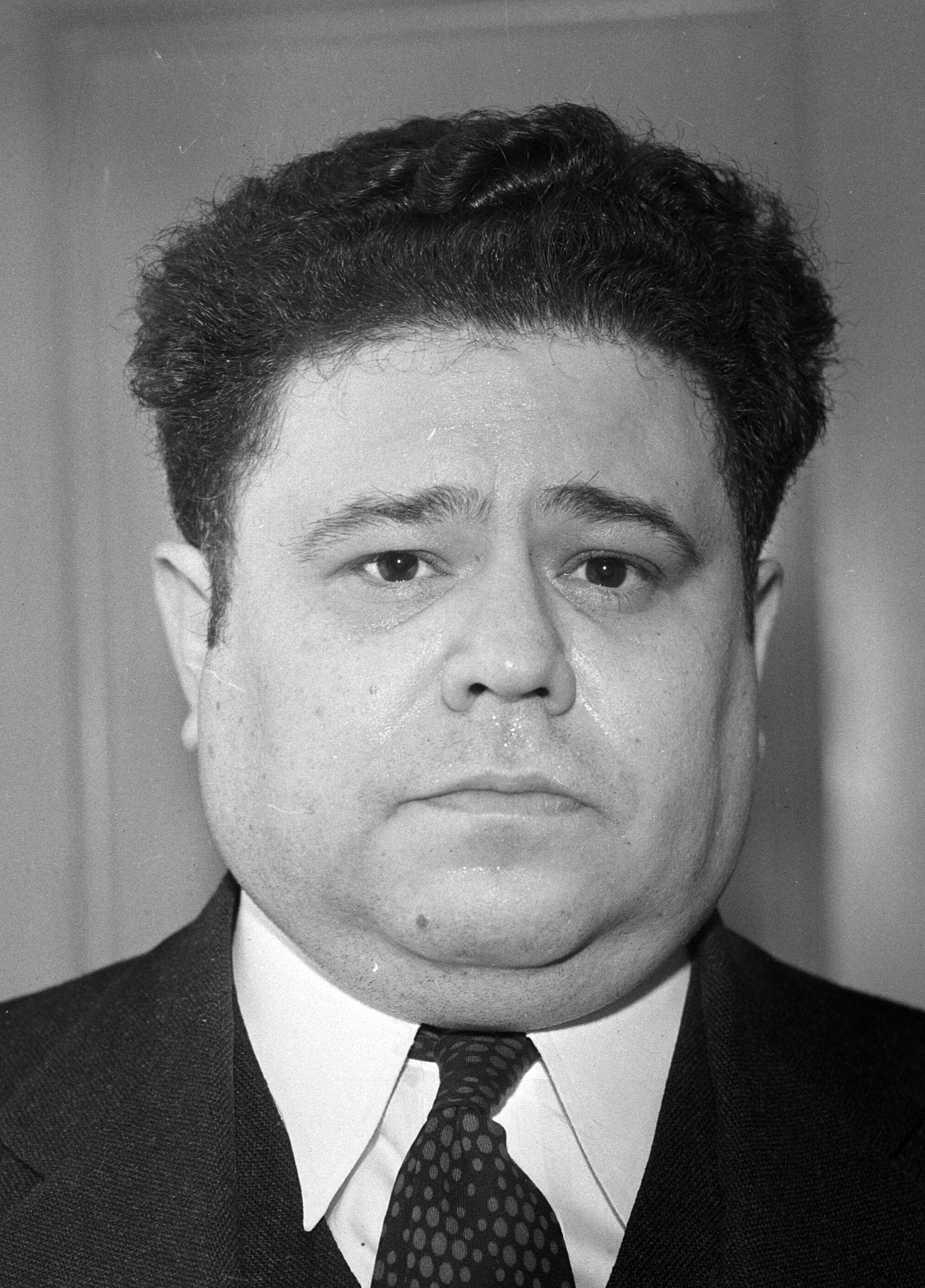
Sokolsky in 1933

George Ephraim Sokolsky (September 5, 1893 – December 12, 1962) was an American weekly radio broadcaster for the National Association of Manufacturers, and a longtime columnist for the New York Herald Tribune, The New York Sun, and the Hearst-owned newspaper, New York Journal-American. Known as "a leading spokesman for American conservatism", Sokolsky was also an expert on China.

He was widely regarded as Joseph McCarthy's mentor. He even introduced McCarthy to Roy Cohn and G. David Schine, two key players in McCarthy's Red Scare.

== Background ==
George Ephraim Sokolsky was born on September 5, 1893, in Utica, New York. His father was a Russian-born rabbi. In 1917, Sokolsky received a BA from Columbia University's School of Journalism.

== Career ==
=== Russia (1917–1918) ===
While at Columbia University, Sokolsky became a leader among student radicals and headed the welcoming committee for Leon Trotsky who arrived in New York in early January 1917. In February 1917, Sokolsky was attracted by the February Revolution and went to Russia to write for Russian Daily News, an English-language newspaper. After the overthrow of the Kerensky government by the Bolsheviks, he became disillusioned with the revolution. His Columbia classmate Bennett Cerf was to observe many decades later: "Suddenly the flaming radical, Sokolsky, became the flaming reactionary, George Sokolsky, and one of the most important columnists in the United States of America."

=== China (1918–1932) ===
In March 1918, "the Bolsheviks kicked him out" of Russia. With the help of Trotsky, he was able to flee to China, landing with one Yankee dollar in his pocket to work for the Committee on Public Information in Shanghai. He continued as special correspondent for English-language newspapers such as St. Louis Post-Dispatch and London Daily Express as well as contributor to the Philadelphia Public Ledger and The New York Times. He also was editor for the North China Star in Tientsin. He acted as an informant and propagandist for sundry conflicting Asian and Western clients, including Cen Chunxuan. He became "China's official intermediary between foreign bankers and Chinese ministries." Sokolsky became political adviser and friend to Sun Yat-sen, and wrote for his English-language Shanghai Gazette. He also befriended colorful characters that ranged from "Two-Gun" Cohen to Soong Mei-ling, and identified Chiang Kai-shek as "the only revolutionist in China who could make the revolution stick."

Sokolsky's 14-year-long stint in China enabled him to hold himself out as an expert on Asian matters upon his repatriation to the US. His experience of Chinese culture was tinged with ambivalence: "Perhaps in no other city does so much human energy go into the search for amusement as among the foreign population of Shanghai. Ladies go to their amusements with even greater avidity. Work at home can always be done by boys and amahs and club life becomes the center of one's aims and ambitions. Dinner parties at clubs and hotels, night after night of dancing and jazz, turn the sweet girl who comes here to marry a man out East into a tired matron while still in her thirties: blasé, wearied and uninterested in life." Sokolsky went on to complain about the corrosive effect of the "foreign exchange" upon the younger Chinese: "It would seem that every foreign vice and extravagance has its votaries among the younger Chinese in Shanghai who, meeting largely with the wider elements of the foreign population, copy their lust for pleasure as though it were the hallmark of modernity."

In 1926 Sokolsky became associate editor for The Far Eastern Review until March 1931.

=== US (1935–1962) ===
After returning to the US in 1935, Sokolsky strongly aligned himself with the National Association of Manufacturers (NAM) in touting its conception of the American way of life. NAM followed the New Deal in laying claim to "the greatest good for the greatest number." Sokolsky encouraged the NAM to reach out and awaken the passions of the American middle class in opposition to the "collectivistic" current of the New Dealers.

Also in 1935, Sokolsky began contributing a column of political commentary to the New York Herald Tribune. In 1940, he became a nationally syndicated columnist with his "These Days" column in The New York Sun. He covered current politics, communism (anti-communism), and foreign affairs. Starting in 1950, his column appeared in the New York Journal-American.

In the NBC Radio Network program America's Town Meeting of the Air, Sokolsky argued against Secretary of Labor Frances Perkins' defense of the Social Security Act, calling the 10% of the taxes that the federal government kept, while remitting 90% back to the states that were compelled to conform to a standard of minimum requirements for administering Social Security set by the federal government, "a service charge for coercion." Sokolsky toured the US, writing and making, speeches as an "industrial consultant" on behalf of NAM. The Senate's La Follette Committee on Civil Liberties reported in 1938 that for his speaking engagements and other work he was paid nearly $40,000, through publicity firm Hill & Knowlton, by the NAM and the Iron and Steel Institute. He encapsulated his political philosophy in personalized slogans: "I do not like coercion in any form. I prefer spontaneous enthusiasms." He wrote signed columns attacking the Roosevelt administration for its failure to support the Kuomintang.

In 1948, Sokolsky became a commentator for the ABC network through 1961.

In 1948, he was named director of the American Jewish League Against Communism, a position he held until his death in 1962.

Sokolsky became a vocal supporter of Senator Joseph McCarthy, an intimate of J. Edgar Hoover, and a close friend of Roy Cohn, who eventually dedicated to him McCarthy, his sympathetic study of his former employer. The Korean War entrenched him in his suspicions of a vast anti-American conspiracy. In one of his columns he asked, "If our far eastern policy was not betrayed, why are we fighting in Korea?" In his newspaper column Sokolsky supported the right wing of the Republican Party. He wanted either Robert A. Taft or Douglas MacArthur to get the presidential nomination in 1952, and frequently criticized the Eisenhower administration.

In 1951, the US Supreme Court upheld the convictions of contempt of the United States Congress against the Hollywood Ten, who had argued unsuccessfully that their First Amendment protections prohibited Congress from asking about their political activities. Thereupon, the American Legion presented the movie studios with a list of some 300 people, meant as a de facto blacklist. Those listed were given an opportunity to exonerate themselves by answering the charges against them in a letter. If the blacklisted artists refused to write a letter, they were fired. The studios submitted the letters from those who cooperated to the American Legion. The American Legion passed judgment on the acceptability of excuses, referring problematic cases to Sokolsky. As its "clearance man", Sokolsky worked pro bono on rendering a final decision on clearing the letter writer from the blacklist, either on his own or in consultation with Hollywood union leader Roy Brewer and/or actor Ward Bond, respectively the first and the second presidents of the Motion Picture Alliance for the Preservation of American Ideals. Artists who failed to meet the standards of political correctness were consigned to unemployment. According to Victor S. Navasky, "Newspaper columnists such as George Sokolsky, Victor Riesel, Walter Winchell, Jack O'Brian, and Hedda Hopper were as happy to fill their spaces by getting the deserved off the list as by putting the blameworthy on." Of course, distinctions between those who "deserved" removal from the blacklist and those who were "blameworthy" were determined, often arbitrarily, by the subjective judgment of powerful gatekeepers like Sokolsky.

In a March 1954 Hearst newspaper column, Sokolsky denounced the exposure of McCarthy by Fred W. Friendly and Edward R. Murrow on a See It Now episode that had been broadcast on March 9, 1954. Later in that year, Time magazine characterized Sokolsky as a man who "can be called the high priest of militant U.S. anti-Communism." Sokolsky never relented in his animadversions against world communism and its self-appointed standard bearer, the Soviet Union. In February 1962, he startled his readers by asserting that "if Khrushchev falls, we shall have immediate war."

== Personal life and death ==
In 1922, Sokolsky broke a social taboo by marrying Rosalind Phang, a woman of mixed Caribbean-Chinese descent. She died in 1933.

From 1953 to 1974, the Federal Bureau of Investigation collected records about him.

During the Cuban Missile Crisis. Sokolsky advocated a vigorous American response by asking: "Do we have to stand still until Soviet Russia has established a missile and submarine base in Cuba?"

At a dinner laid on in his honor in 1962 by the American Jewish League Against Communism, Sokolsky found a bright side to Russia's heavy-handed treatment of its Jewish citizens, pointing out:

It is inevitable that a movement based on atheism be anti-Semitic. The Communists must hate us. We want them to hate us. It gives us pride and dignity that we don't count them among our friends.

Sokolsky died aged 69 on December 12, 1962, of a heart attack, in Manhattan. His funeral service took place at New York's Central Synagogue. Attendees included former President Herbert Hoover, Attorney General Robert F. Kennedy, FBI Director J. Edgar Hoover, General Douglas MacArthur, US Senator Barry Goldwater, and New York City Mayor Robert F. Wagner.

== Awards ==
- Honorary degree, Notre Dame University
- Honorary degree, St. Bonaventure University
- Honorary degree, University of Montana

== Works ==
In January 1932, Sokolsky was touring the States and lecturing on topics that included (here, taken from his appearance at the Fountain Street Baptist Church):

- The Struggle for Manchuria
- The Rise of Communism in China
- Japan's Search for Power and Security
- The "White Man" in the Far East
- Russia's Ambitions in Asia
- Current Leaders in China, Japan, and Other Far Eastern Countries
- The New Womanhood in the Far East
- The Open Door Policy
- Will Russia's Five Year Plan Affect American Exports to Far Eastern Countries?
- Can Communism Replace Capitalism in Far Eastern Countries?
- Is There an Oriental Mind?
- Is the East Different?
- The Jews of China
- Can the United States Succeed as an Exporter?

Books included:

- An Outline of Universal History, The Commercial Press, 1928
- The Story of the Chinese Eastern Railway, North-China Daily News & Herald, Ltd, 1929
- The Tinder Box of Asia, Doubleday, Doran & Company, Inc., 1933
- Labor's Fight for Power, Doubleday, Doran & Company, Inc., 1934
- We Jews, Doubleday, Doran & Company, Inc., 1935
- Platform Pioneering by the N.A.M., National Association of Manufacturers, 1937
- The American Way of Life, Farrar & Rinehart, 1939
- Is Communism a Menace? A Debate Between Earl Browder and George E. Sokolsky, New York, New Masses, 1943
- The Reminiscences of George Sokolsky, Oral History Research Office, Columbia University, 1972

== See also ==
- Anti-communism
- National Association of Manufacturers
- Hearst Communications
