= Freda Utley =

English scholar, political activist and author (1898–1978)

- Freda Utley in 1943
- Born: 23 January 1898; London, UK
- Died: 21 January 1978 (aged 79); Washington, D.C., US
- Education: King's College London
- Occupations: Scholar, author
- Spouse: Arcadi Berdichevsky
- Relatives: William Herbert Utley (father)

Winifred Utley (23 January 1898 – 21 January 1978), commonly known as Freda Utley, was an English scholar, political activist and best-selling author. After visiting the Soviet Union in 1927 as a trade union activist, she joined the Communist Party of Great Britain in 1928. Later, married and living in Moscow, she quickly became disillusioned with communism. When her Russian husband, Arcadi Berdichevsky, was arrested in 1936, she escaped to England with her young son. (Her husband was executed in 1938.)

In 1939, the rest of her family moved to the United States, where she became a leading anticommunist author and activist. She became an American citizen in 1950.

== Early life and work ==
Utley's father was Willie Herbert Utley (1866–1918); her mother was his wife Emily Williamson. Willie Utley was involved with George Bernard Shaw, the Fabians, and labour struggles before becoming an attorney, journalist and businessman. He was introduced to her mother by Edward Aveling, Karl Marx's translator. In her memoirs, Utley describes her early influences as "liberal, socialist and free-thinking, strongly colored by the poetry of revolt and liberty and legends, stories and romances of heroism and adventure."

Utley was educated at a boarding school in Switzerland, after which she returned to her native England to earn a B.A. degree followed by an M.A. degree in history (with first class honours) at King's College London. The UK General Strike of 1926 and what she calls the "betrayal" of the workers by the British Trade Union Council and the Labour Party made her more favourable to communism. After visiting Russia as the vice-president of the University Labour Federation in 1927, she joined the British Communist Party (CPGB) in 1928. Utley writes about her conversion: "It was a passion for the emancipation of mankind, not the blueprint of a planned society nor any mystical yearning to merge myself in a fellowship absolving me of personal responsibility, which both led me into the Communist fold, and caused me to leave it as soon as I learned that it meant submission to the most total tyranny which mankind has ever experienced."

From 1926 to 1928, she was a research fellow at the London School of Economics. During this period she focused on labour and production issues in manufacturing, in her case, the textile industries of Lancashire, then beginning to face competition from operators in India and Japan. In 1928, she married Russian economist Arcadi Berdichevsky who had been working in England for Arcos, the Soviet trade mission. After a visit to the Soviet Union in 1928, the Communist International sent Berdichevsky and Freda Utley on missions to Siberia, China and Japan, where she lived for nine months. In 1931, she published her first book, Lancashire and the Far East which established her as an authority on the subject of international competition in the cotton trades.

Upon her return to Moscow with her husband, she became disillusioned with the system's inability to provide decent medical care or housing as well as the corrupt, hierarchical Communist Party system. Living in Moscow from 1930 to 1936, she worked as a translator, editor and a senior scientific worker at the Academy of Sciences' Institute of World Economy and Politics. During this time she also wrote, from a Marxist perspective, Japan's Feet of Clay, an exposé of the Japanese textile industries that also attacked Western support for Japanese imperialism. The book was an international bestseller, translated into five languages, and solidified her credentials in communist circles.

On 14 April 1936, Soviet police arrested her husband, then the head of an import/export government group. Unable to aid him, she left soon after for England with her young son Jon, using British names and passports. There, she mobilized important leftist friends like Shaw, Russell and Harold Laski to try to find Arcadi and even sent a letter directly to Soviet leader Joseph Stalin. Utley tried to get CPGB leader Harry Pollitt to intercede with Moscow on behalf of her Russian husband, but Pollitt refused. She received two postcards from Arcadi reporting his five years' sentence to an Arctic Circle prison for alleged association with Trotskyists. (She herself had flirted with Trotskyism.)

In 1956, she learned he had died on 30 March 1938. It would not be until 2004 that her son Jon Basil Utley would learn from the Russian government the details of his death by firing squad for leading a hunger strike at the Vorkuta prison labour camp. He was "rehabilitated" posthumously in 1961 under post-Stalin rehabilitation laws.

In 1938, Utley published two books on Japan's military attacks on China at the beginning of the Second Sino-Japanese War (1937–1945). Japan's Gamble in China, with an introduction by Laski, described Japan as "a police state, governed by a bureaucracy wedded to a plutocracy." The News Chronicle made her a war correspondent and she spent three months in China in 1938, making two trips to the front line. Her 1939 book China at War idealized the Chinese communists. The work aroused considerable popular sympathy for China and helped foment poor relations with Japan prior to World War II. Her goal was to make for herself an international reputation and prove her communist credentials to free her husband. Author Francis Beckett includes a chapter on Utley's ordeals in his 2004 book Stalin's British Victims.

== Anticommunism ==
Utley and her son and mother moved to the United States in 1939. Believing Arcadi to be dead, she expressed, in the 1940s, her disgust with communism and the Soviet Union in her book The Dream We Lost, later published as Lost Illusions. Bertrand Russell wrote the introduction: "I knew Freda Utley first when she was in the process of becoming a Communist; I continued to know her through the stages of her disenchantment, the tragedy of her husband's arrest, and the despair induced by the failure of all her efforts to procure his release." Utley described her work as emanating from "the only Western writer who had known Russia both from inside and from below, sharing some of the hardships and all the fears of the forcibly silenced Russian people."

In a review, author Pearl Buck wrote: "It is a strongly unassailable indictment of Russian Communism. It is a strongly dramatic story and one interesting enough to make a major novel, the story of a brilliant mind, rigorously truthful in its working". Communist publishers and intelligentsia in both Britain and the US tried to discredit Utley. In the posthumously published book Reagan, In His Own Hand: The Writings of Ronald Reagan That Reveal His Revolutionary Vision for America, Ronald Reagan's speechwriter wrote about Utley that "many of the intellectuals didn't want to hear what she had to say. She had impressive academic credentials when she came to the U.S. but publishers and the academy closed doors against her. She understood all too well. She had tried communism and learned its falseness. She said only those 'who have never fully committed themselves to the communist cause' can continue to believe in it."

In 1940, Guido Baracchi, a scholar, communist and labor advocate, revealed a letter Utley had written to a friend in 1938:

I have not pretended to be a Stalinist but have kept my mouth shut about Russia until now. Naturally I have no illusions left—nor had any before they took Arcadi. I am not a Trotskyist as I have become convinced that all dictatorships are much the same and that power corrupts everyone. Without democracy there can be no real socialism. But I fear the world is progressing towards 'National Socialism' on the Russian-German model. Little difference between them."

In 1945, Reader's Digest sent Freda Utley to China as a correspondent. The trip resulted in Last Chance in China, which held that Western policies, especially cutting off armaments to the Chinese Nationalists, favored the Chinese Communist Party victory. She began a crusade to name those who "lost China".

In 1948, Reader's Digest posted Utley to (Germany), resulting in Utley's next book, The High Cost of Vengeance which criticizes as war crimes Allied occupation policies, including the expulsion of millions of Germans from European nations after World War II and the Morgenthau plan. She also accused the United States of torture of German captives, the Allied use of slave labour in France and the Soviet Union and criticized the Nuremberg Trials legal processes. Utley's book was excoriated by The New York Times but was according to her own publisher praised by Reinhold Niebuhr in The Nation magazine.

The last of her studies of the Far East, The China Story, was published in 1951 and was a best seller for several months. Time magazine called Utley "a seasoned, firsthand observer of China events." Following the Suez Canal Crisis of 1956, Utley spent six months in the Middle East and published her last book on international affairs Will the Middle East Go West? In it, she warned that America's support of Israel would drive the Arab countries into the waiting arms of the communists. In 1970, Utley published the first volume of her autobiography Odyssey of a Liberal which recorded her early experiences in Fabian Society circles, education, marriage, life in the Soviet Union and travels up until 1945. She never published the second volume.

Upon her death in 1978, Time magazine published an obituary of Utley. The New York Times mentioned a gathering of leading conservatives to pay tribute to Utley ten years after her death. In 2005, her son, Jon Utley, endowed the Freda Utley Prize for Advancing Liberty, administered by the Atlas Economic Research Foundation. Ten thousand dollars a year is bestowed upon overseas think tanks that promote economic liberalism and minimal government.

== Controversies ==
Freda Utley's bestseller Japan's Feet of Clay was criticized for factual inaccuracies and an exaggerated negative view of the Japanese people and a misinterpretation of the class system. The Japanese government held her responsible for the initiation of an American boycott of Japanese goods and banned the book and Utley from Japan. Nevertheless, Stanford University keeps "Freda Utley collection's coverage of sociopolitical conditions in interwar Japan and the Sino-Japanese conflict" in its Japanese collection.

During the late 1930s and 1940s, Utley supported the 1938 Munich Agreement with Adolf Hitler because she thought the Soviet Union was more dangerous than Hitler and doubted the US and Britain could defeat the German war machine. Also, she asserted that most of the people in the Sudetenland wanted to be part of Germany instead of Czechoslovakia, as also asserted by Nazi Germany. Once in America, she sympathized with the antiwar America First Committee. In 1941, she reached a mass Reader's Digest audience calling for a negotiated peace between (Germany) and Britain. She also opposed the demand for Germany's unconditional surrender.

Knowing her views were rooted in opposition to the Soviet Union, the Friends of the Soviet Union tried for four years to have her deported. Finally, in 1944, Representative Jerry Voorhis passed a private bill for "the relief of Freda Utley" from the 1940 Alien Registration Act.

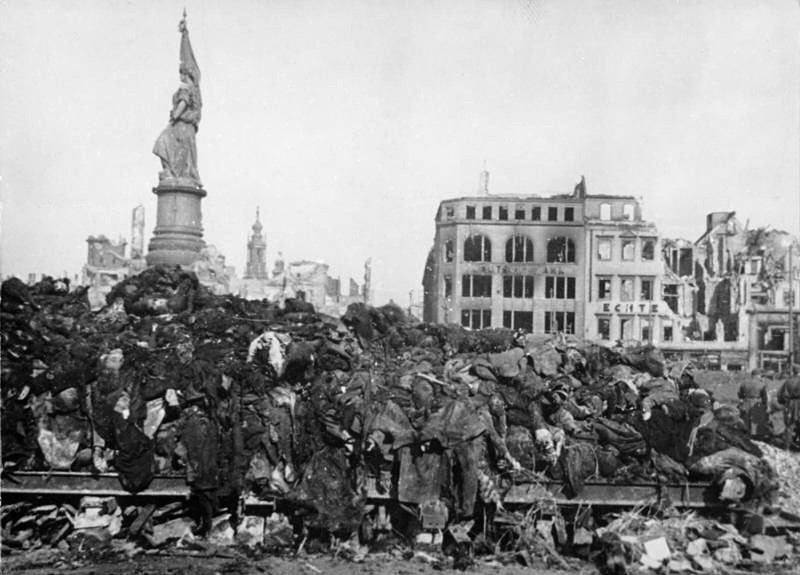
Victims of the Allied bombing of Dresden.

Utley's criticisms of Allied policies in her book The High Cost of Vengeance from 1949 included charges of "crimes against humanity":

A thoughtful American professor, whom I met in Heidelberg, expressed the opinion that the United States military authorities on entering Germany and seeing the ghastly destruction wrought by our obliteration bombing were fearful that knowledge of it would cause a revulsion of opinion in America and might prevent the carrying out of Washington's policy for Germany by awakening sympathy for the defeated and realization of our war crimes. This, he believes, is the reason why a whole fleet of aircraft was used by General Eisenhower to bring journalists, Congressmen, and churchmen to see the concentration camps; the idea being that the sight of Hitler's starved victims would obliterate consciousness of our own guilt. Certainly it worked out that way.

— Freda Utley – The High Cost of Vengeance, Chicago, 1949, p. 183

Other statements like: "There [is] no crime that the Nazis committed that we or our allies did not also commit ourselves" caused controversy. Utley wrote in The High Cost of Vengeance: "I had referred to our obliteration bombing, the mass expropriation and expulsion from their homes of twelve million Germans on account of their race; the starving of the Germans during the first years of the occupation; the use of prisoners as slave labourers; the Russian concentration camps, and the looting perpetrated by Americans as well as Russians." In her 1993 book Denying the Holocaust: The Growing Assault on Truth and Memory, the American historian Deborah Lipstadt critically examines the dissemination and impact of such arguments by Utley and other "revisionists", claiming that "the argument that the United States committed atrocities as great, if not greater, than those committed by Germany has become a fulcrum of contemporary Holocaust denial."

In the 1950s, Utley helped Senator Joseph McCarthy compile his lists of highly placed people suspected of communist sympathies. She gave evidence against China expert Owen Lattimore to the Tydings Committee and evidence against alleged "fellow travelers" (communist sympathizers) like Asian scholar J. K. Fairbank and Red Star Over China author Edgar Snow to other congressional committees. In the unpublished second volume of her autobiography, she held that McCarthy had been "captured by the forces of the ultra-right and thereby led to destruction."

== Books ==
- Lancashire and the Far East. Allen & Unwin (1931)
- Published under the pseudonym Y.Z. From Moscow To Samarkand. Hogarth Press (1934)
- Japan's Feet of Clay. Faber & Faber, London (1937)
- Japan's Gamble in China. Faber & Faber, London (1938)
- China at War. John Day Company, New York (1938)
- The Dream We Lost: The Soviet Union Then and Now. John Day Company, New York (1940)
- The High Cost of Vengeance, Henry Regnery Company, Chicago, (1949) (translated to German as Kostspielige Rache)
- Last Chance in China. Indianapolis, Bobbs-Merrill, (1948)
- Lost Illusion (revision of The Dream We Lost), George Allen & Unwin Ltd, (1948)
- The China Story. Henry Regnery Company, Chicago, (1951)
- Will the Middle East Go West?. Henry Regnery Company, Chicago, (1956)
- Odyssey of a Liberal: Memoirs. Washington National Press, Inc., (1970)
