= Sokolsky District, Nizhny Novgorod Oblast =

Sokolsky District Сокольский район (Russian)
- District
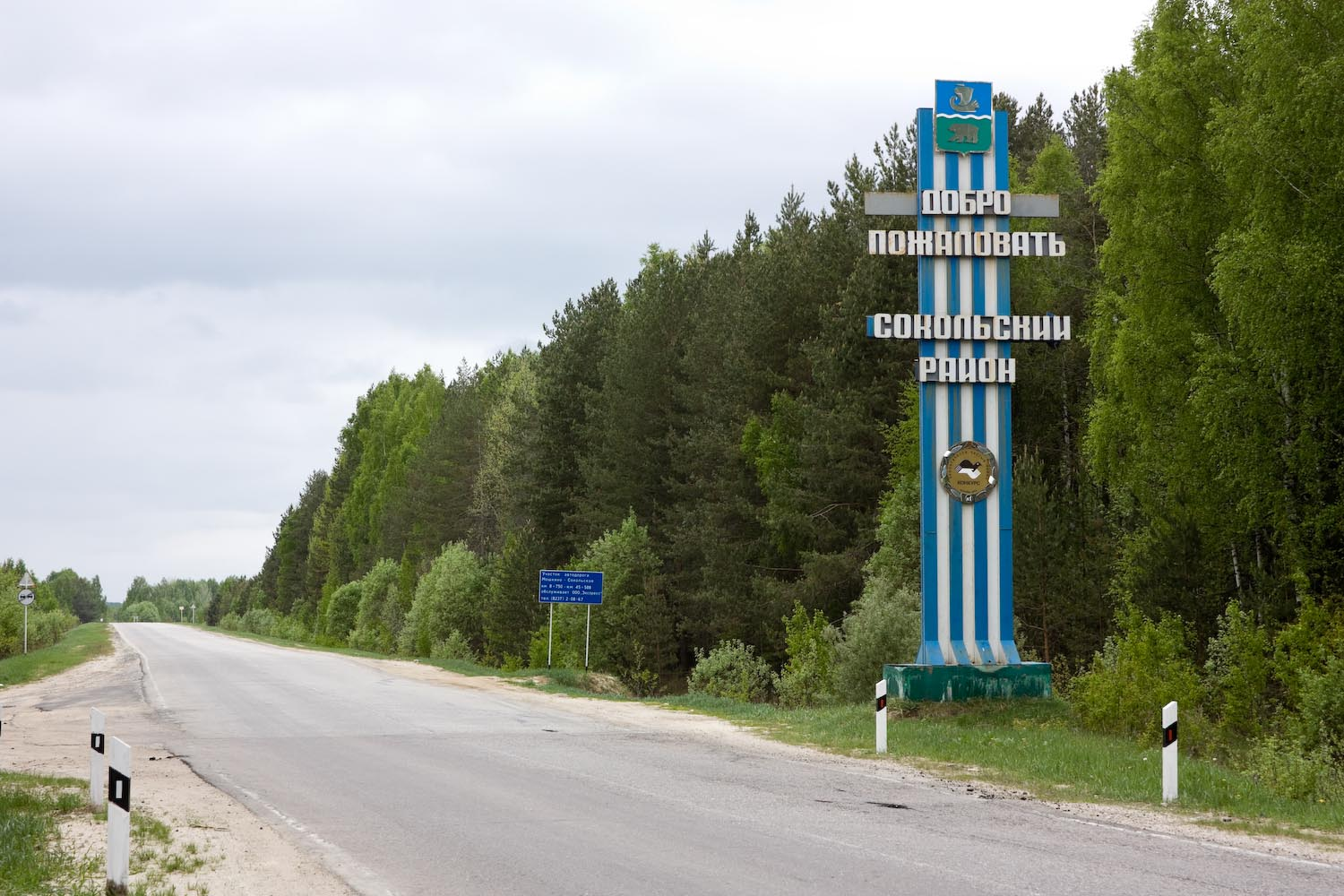
- Welcome sign at the Sokolsky District border

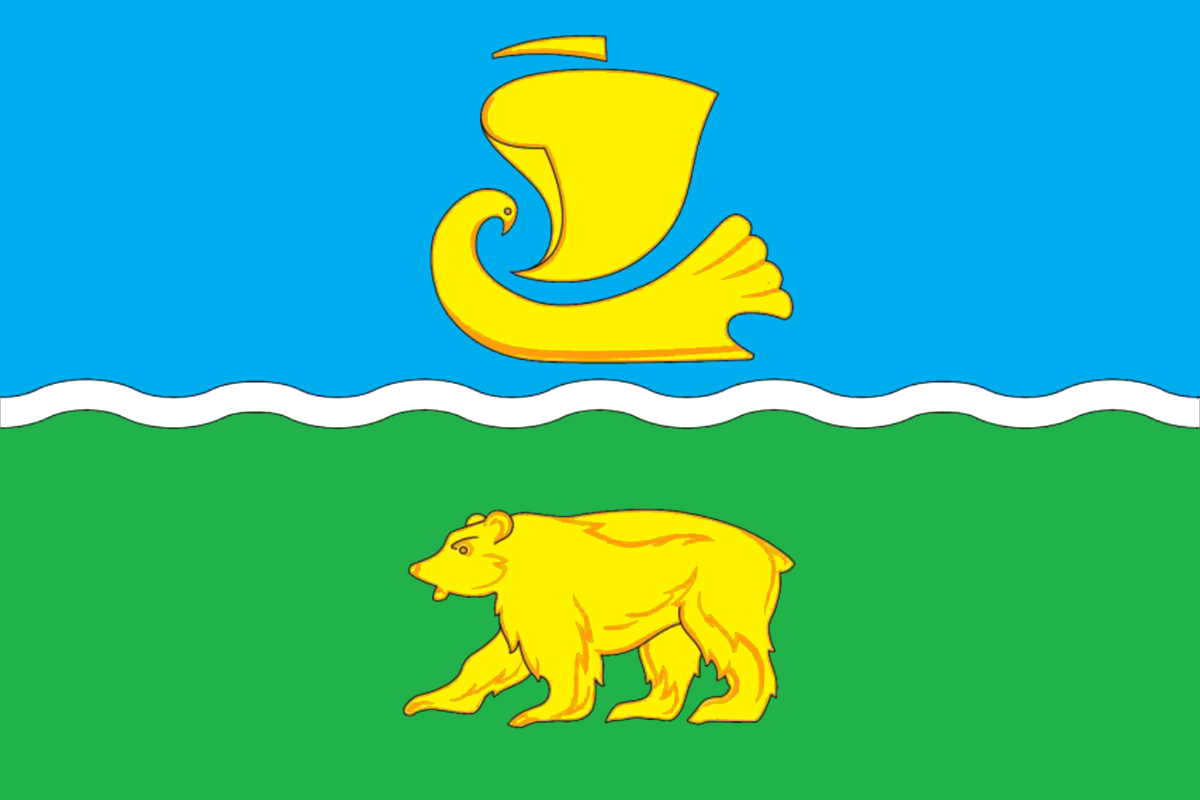
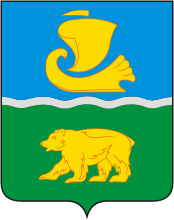
- Flag Coat of arms
- Location of Sokolsky District in Nizhny Novgorod Oblast
- Coordinates: 57°08′39″N 43°09′45″E
- Country: Russia
- Federal subject: Nizhny Novgorod Oblast
- Established: 25 January 1935
- Administrative center: Sokolskoye

Area
  - Total: 1,981.4 km^{2} (765.0 sq mi)

Population (2010 Census)
  - Total: 14,139
  - Density: 7.1359/km^{2} (18.482/sq mi)
  - Urban: 44.9%
  - Rural: 55.1%

Administrative structure
  - Administrative divisions: 1 Work settlements, 3 Selsoviets
  - Inhabited localities: 1 urban-type settlements, 242 rural localities

Municipal structure
  - Municipally incorporated as: Sokolsky Urban Okrug
- Time zone: UTC+3 (MSK)
- OKTMO ID: 22749000
- Website: http://sokolskoe.omsu-nnov.ru

Sokolsky District (Russian: Соко́льский райо́н) is an administrative district (raion), one of the forty in Nizhny Novgorod Oblast, Russia. As a municipal division, it is incorporated as Sokolsky Urban Okrug. It is located in the northwest of the oblast. The area of the district is 1,981.4 square kilometers (765.0 sq mi). Its administrative center is the urban locality (a work settlement) of Sokolskoye. Population: 14,139 (2010 Census); 16,137 (2002 census); 19,559 (1989 Soviet census). The population of Sokolskoye accounts for 44.9% of the district's total population.

== History ==
The district was a part of Ivanovo Oblast until 1994.
