= Tianming (disambiguation) =

Tianming may refer to:

- Mandate of Heaven (天命), traditional Chinese philosophical concept concerning the legitimacy of rulers
- Tianming, Shaanxi (天明), a town in Chenggu County, Shaanxi, China

== Historical eras ==
- Tianming (天明; 623–624), era name used by Fu Gongshi, self-proclaimed emperor of Song during the Sui–Tang transition
- Tianming (天命; 1616–1627), era name used by Nurhaci, Manchu chieftain and khan of the Later Jin

== Film and TV ==
- Daybreak (1933 film) (天明), 1933 Chinese silent film
- Succession War (TV series) (天命), 2018 Hong Kong TV series

== See also ==
- Mandate of Heaven (disambiguation)
