= Mandate of Heaven (disambiguation) =

The Mandate of Heaven is a historical concept in Chinese history.

Mandate of Heaven can also refer to:

- The Mandate of Heaven: Record of a Civil War, China 1945–49 by John F. Melby
- Might and Magic VI: The Mandate of Heaven, a computer game

== See also ==
- Tianming (disambiguation)
