= Oliver Edmund Clubb =

American diplomat and historian

O. Edmund Clubb
- Born: Oliver Edmund Clubb; February 16, 1901; South Park, Minnesota
- Died: May 9, 1989 (aged 88); New York City
- Occupation: Foreign Service official
- Employer: U.S. Department of State
- Known for: China Hand; accused by Joseph McCarthy

Oliver Edmund Clubb (16 February 1901 - 9 May 1989) was a 20th-century American diplomat and historian. He was considered one of the China Hands: United States State Department officials attacked during McCarthyism in the 1950s for "losing China" to the Communists.

== Background ==
Oliver Edmund Clubb was born on February 16, 1901, in South Park, Minnesota. His father was a cattle rancher. He had one brother (surviving at his time of death), Lester Clubb.

During World War I, he enlisted age 17 for military service and later studied international law at the University of Washington and the University of Minnesota.

== Career ==
In 1928, Clubb passed the Foreign Service exam. In 1929, he received his first assignment to Beijing. Clubb spent two decades in government service as a member of the American Foreign Diplomatic Corps.

On December 5, 1941 (two days before the Japanese attack on Pearl Harbor), Clubb, then in Indochina, found himself seized by occupying Japanese forces and held, first for two months in solitary confinement, then another six months, and finally exchanged for Japanese held by the Allies.

With the exception of a brief period in Washington, Mr. Clubb spent the rest of the war and the immediate postwar period in the Soviet Far East, Manchuria and China. During World War II, he served in Chunking and Sianking province and then Vladivostok in 1944. Posts following the war included cities in Manchuria.

In 1949, his last overseas station was Beijing in 1949, where he was consul general as the U.S. left the country during the Communist takeover by Mao Zedong. Clubb returned to Washington, DC, where he took over as chief of State's China desk.

In 1950 (or 1951), U.S. Senator Joseph McCarthy investigated and condemned Clubb; the State Department Loyalty Board suspended him as a security risk.

One cause for his suspension was the recollection of Whittaker Chambers, who, as part of FBI inquiries related to the Hiss Case, had recalled Clubb's visit in 1932 to the offices of the New Masses (where Chambers was an editor). (In his 1952 memoir, Witness, Chambers claimed "I had not intended to divulge the messenger's name.") Clubb was delivering a letter from Agnes Smedley, a well-known left-wing American journalist in China. Clubb denied any knowledge of any wrongdoing by delivering the letter (whose contents he did not know).

A second cause, also in 1932, was a report he made that the Chinese Communists were strong and popular in many regions, while the Chinese Nationalists were corrupt–although the Nationalists might force the Communists to flee west (predicting the Long March, "later to be cited by his critics as evidence of his pro-Communist leanings."

Clubb won an appeal for reinstatement but then resigned as he decided that "his career was finished." He was one of four China Hands dismissed or who resigned from State: John Paton Davies, Jr., John S. Service, John Carter Vincent.

== Personal and death ==
Clubb married Mariann E. H. Smith; they had one daughter and one son.

He died age 88 on May 9, 1989, of Parkinson's disease at Columbia-Presbyterian Medical Center.

== Writings ==
After being forced out of the State Department, Clubb pursued a vigorous career in scholarly writing, including:

- Clubb, O. Edmund. "Chiang Kai-shek's Waterloo: The Battle of the Hwai-Hai." Pacific Historical Review 25.4 (1956): 389-399. online
- Clubb, O. Edmund. "Manchuria in the Balance, 1945-1946." Pacific Historical Review 26.4 (1957): 377-389. online
- Clubb, O. Edmund. "China's Position in Asia." Journal of International Affairs 17.2 (1963): 113-125. online
- Clubb, O. Edmund (1964). 20th Century China. New York: Columbia University Press. ISBN 9780231045186.; online review
- Clubb, O. Edmund (1968). Communism in China, as Reported from Hankow in 1932. New York: Columbia University Press. ISBN 978-1299032323.
- Clubb, O. Edmund (1971). "China & Russia; The "Great Game". Studies of the East Asian Institute. New York: Columbia University Press. ISBN 9780231027403.; online review
- Clubb, O. Edmund (1974). The Witness and I. New York: Columbia University Press. ISBN 9780231038591.

== See also ==
- China Hands
- John Paton Davies, Jr.
- John S. Service
- John Carter Vincent
- Whittaker Chambers
- Joseph McCarthy
- McCarthyism
