= China Hands =

Experts in the language, culture, and people of China

The term China Hand originally referred to 19th-century merchants in the treaty ports of China, but came to be used for anyone with expert knowledge of the language, culture, and people of China. In 1940s America, the term China Hands came to refer to a group of American diplomats, journalists, and soldiers who were known for their knowledge of China and influence on U.S. policy before, during, and after World War II. During and after the Cold War, the term China watcher became popularized: and, with some overlap, the term sinologist also describes a China expert in English, particularly in academic contexts or in reference to the expert's academic background.

Zhongguo tong (simplified Chinese: 中国通; traditional Chinese: 中國通; pinyin: Zhōngguó tōng; lit. 'China expert'), sometimes translated as "old China Hand", refers to a foreigner who shows a familiarity with, or affinity for, Chinese language and culture.

== China Hands in treaty port China ==
Before the Opium Wars of 1839–1843, the Old China Trade created a group of British and American merchants who did not know the Chinese language but depended on their Chinese trading partners. They nonetheless had a reputation for being experts, and exerted some influence on policy in London. Merchants, journalists, and even missionaries established themselves in China, especially in the Treaty Ports created by a series of treaties after the Opium Wars. The foreign community in Shanghai was especially lively and organized. Those who carried out their careers in these territories were likely to be called "China Hands", or "Old China Hands". The United States Army maintained a training station in Tianjin, and its officers, including future General George Marshall (famous for the Marshall plan), were called "Old China Hands." Other Army officers trained there include David D. Barrett, who headed the Army's wartime Dixie Mission.

== World War II era China Hands ==
During World War II some Foreign Service Officers of the United States Department of State had experience in China, a few with expertise going back to the 1920s. Since the general expectation was that the war would continue for perhaps another two years and that the invasion of Japan would be based in China, General Joseph Stilwell determined that American interest required liaison with the military force of the communists. At his behest, the Dixie Mission was sent to the Communist headquarters in Yan'an in July 1944. Colonel David Barrett and John S. Service reported favorably on the strength and capabilities of the Communist led forces compared with the Chinese Nationalists. Many China Hands argued that it would be in American national interest to work with the communists during the war, and to maintain relations if, as many government and civilian experts expected, they gained power. Theodore White, correspondent for Time magazine was among the many journalists who visited Yan'an and described the effectiveness of communist political mobilization. This view was opposed by the new U.S. Ambassador to China Patrick Hurley. Hurley, a Republican recruited by President Franklin D. Roosevelt to promote a bipartisan China policy, initially felt there was no more difference between the Chinese Communists and Nationalists than between the Democrats and Republicans in his home state of Oklahoma. But Hurley wanted to form a coalition government led by Chiang Kai-shek. He accused Foreign Service Officers such as Service, Davies, and John Emmerson of disloyalty and had them removed from China. Furthermore, Hurley claimed that the Chinese Communists were not real communists.

Nationalist soldiers killed in World War II numbered approximately ten times more than communists killed, according to CPC records. China Burma India Theater Commander Joseph Stilwell claimed that communists were doing more than the Nationalists, and sought to cut off all US aid to China.

John Service praised the Communists and claimed that the CPC were democratic reformers, likening them to European socialists rather than Soviet communists and claimed that they would preserve levels of capitalism for an extended time until a peaceful transition to a fully realized communist society. Service criticized the Nationalist government as "fascist," "undemocratic," and "feudal", while he described the communists as "progressive" and "democratic".

The journalist Edgar Snow and his wife used extraterritorial status of foreigners to protect themselves when they assisted student protest movements in 1936, disseminating anti-government materials to the Chinese. They acknowledged that they would have been executed were they not exempted. He also admitted that he modified his reports in accordance with the wishes of the communists, to portray them as democratic socialist reformers.

U.S. Ambassador to China Clarence Gauss recommended the United States "pull up the plug and let the whole Chinese Government go down the drain". The US strove to send aid to the Chinese Communists during the war.

== Beginning of the Cold War ==
After the sudden surrender of Japan in 1945 and the onset of the Cold War, the Communists and the Nationalists were locked in a civil war. The China Hand view was propounded by Harvard professor John Fairbank in his The United States and China (1948) and in the bestselling book Thunder Out of China, published in 1946 by Theodore White and Annalee Jacoby. They hoped that American policy could encourage Chinese nationalism and prevent alignment with Soviet communism. Patrick Hurley testified to Congress that the China Hands had subverted his mission and General Albert Wedemeyer blamed the State Department for failing to act. When the Chinese Communists declared victory in 1949, the immediate outcry by anti-communists was the shibboleth "Who lost China?" John T. Flynn, Louis F. Budenz, Freda Utley, none of whom had any professional expertise in Chinese history or politics, were among the many who charged that China Hands had undermined Chiang Kai-shek, misled the American public and lost China either through naive ignorance of the true nature of Marxism or even allegiance to the Soviet Union. John Service, they pointed out, had admitted that before he went to Yan'an he had not read the basic texts of Marxism, and the other China Hands were no better informed. Senator Joseph McCarthy expanded these accusations to include Owen Lattimore, who had served as personal adviser to Chiang at the beginning of the war. These charges were developed in a series of congressional hearings, including those into the Institute of Pacific Relations. Foreign Service Officers O. Edmund Clubb, John Paton Davies Jr., John S. Service, and John Carter Vincent were forced out of the Foreign Service, while journalists such as Edgar Snow and Theodore White could not continue their careers in magazine journalism. Career trajectories slowed down for the remaining State Department China Hands, but a few eventually attained ambassadorships: James K. Penfield (Iceland), Philip D. Sprouse (Cambodia), and Fulton Freeman (Colombia and Mexico).

== Nixon and Carter era ==
Public opinion towards China Hands changed with the establishment of America's full diplomatic ties with China which began with President Nixon's visit to the country and culminated with the signing of the Joint Communiqué on the Establishment of Diplomatic Relations under President Carter. Notable was the invitation to the surviving China Hands to testify to the Senate Committee on Foreign Relations in 1971. The chairman, Senator J. William Fulbright, remarked to John Paton Davies on how the China Hands who had "reported honestly about conditions were so persecuted because [they] were honest. This is a strange thing to occur in what is called a civilized country."

== Archival collections ==
Dozens of archival collections related to foreigners who lived and worked in China before 1950, known as the "Old China Hands", are preserved in Special Collections and Archives in the University Library at California State University, Northridge. These collections include correspondence, diaries, photographs, unpublished memoirs, official documents, artifacts, and oral histories, and reflect the lives of refugees, foreign entrepreneurs, missionaries, diplomats, and members of the military (including the China Marines) who lived and worked in China during the first half of the 20th century.

== World War II China Hands ==
- David D. Barrett
- O. Edmund Clubb
- John Paton Davies, Jr.
- John K. Fairbank
- Owen Lattimore
- Raymond P. Ludden
- John F. Melby
- John S. Service
- Edgar Snow
- John Carter Vincent
- Theodore White
