= Clubb =

Clubb is a surname. Notable people with the surname include:

- George Clubb (1844–1924), Scottish-born Australian politician
- Oliver Edmund Clubb (1901–1989), American diplomat and historian
- Tony Clubb (born 1987), English rugby league footballer
- William Clubb (1884–1962), Canadian politician
