= Patrick J. Hurley =

American diplomat and politician

Patrick Hurley
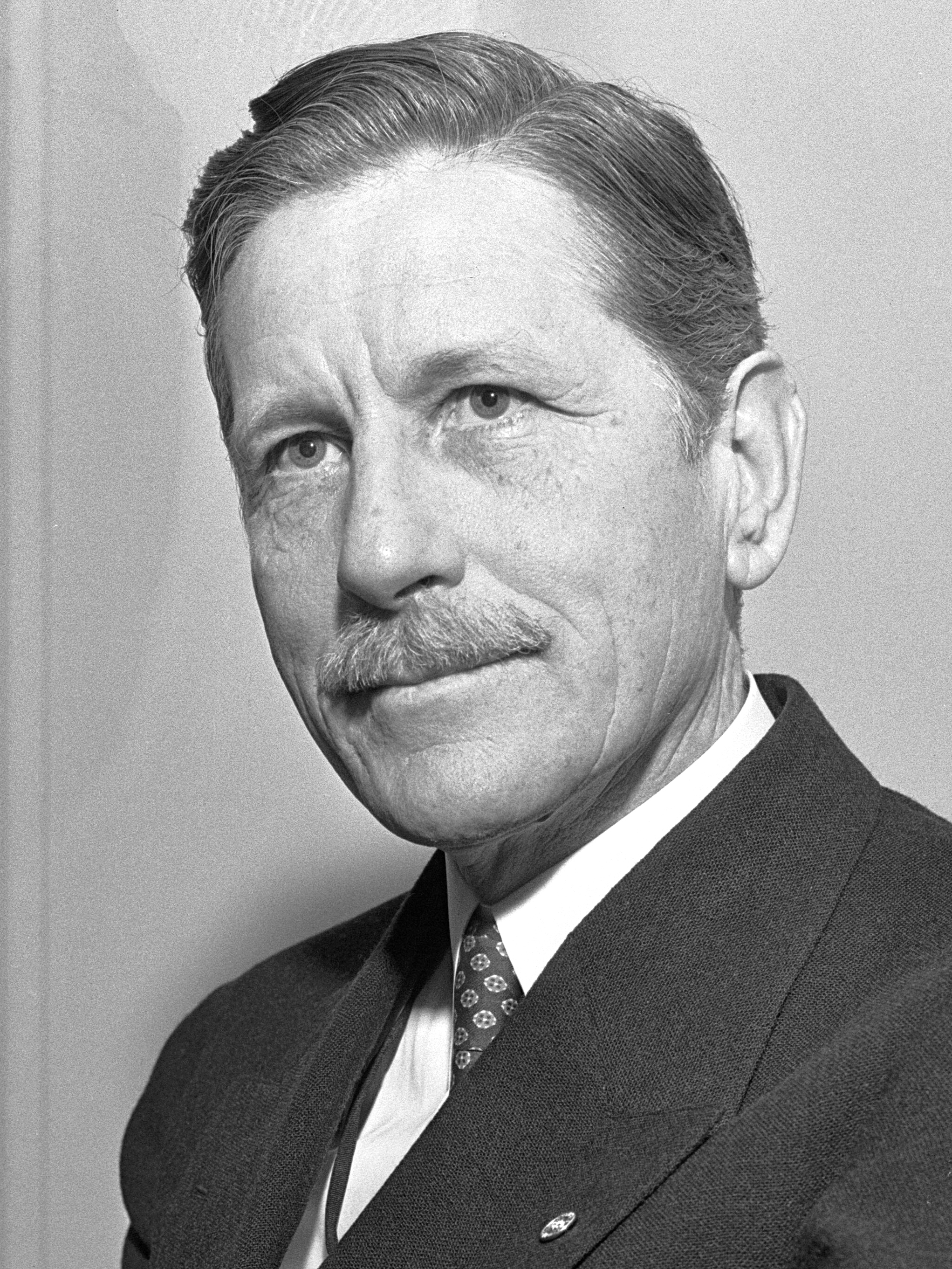
- Hurley in 1935

United States Ambassador to the Republic of China
- In office November 17, 1944 – November 27, 1945
- President: Franklin D. Roosevelt; Harry S. Truman
- Preceded by: Clarence E. Gauss
- Succeeded by: Leighton Stuart

United States Ambassador to New Zealand
- In office April 24, 1942 – August 12, 1942
- President: Franklin D. Roosevelt
- Preceded by: Position established
- Succeeded by: William C. Burdett

51st United States Secretary of War
- In office December 9, 1929 – March 4, 1933
- President: Herbert Hoover
- Preceded by: James Good
- Succeeded by: George Dern

Personal details
- Born: Patrick Jay Hurley; January 8, 1883 Lehigh, Choctaw Nation, Indian Territory
- Died: July 30, 1963 (aged 80) Santa Fe, New Mexico, U.S.
- Party: Republican
- Spouse: Ruth Wilson (m. 1919)
- Children: 4
- Education: Bacone College (BA); National University (LLB); George Washington University (LL.D)

Military service
- Allegiance: United States
- Branch/service: United States Army
- Years of service: 1914–1919; 1941–1945
- Rank: Major General
- Battles/wars: Pancho Villa Expedition; World War I World War II
- Awards: Army Distinguished Service Medal (2); Silver Star; Legion of Merit; Distinguished Flying Cross; Purple Heart

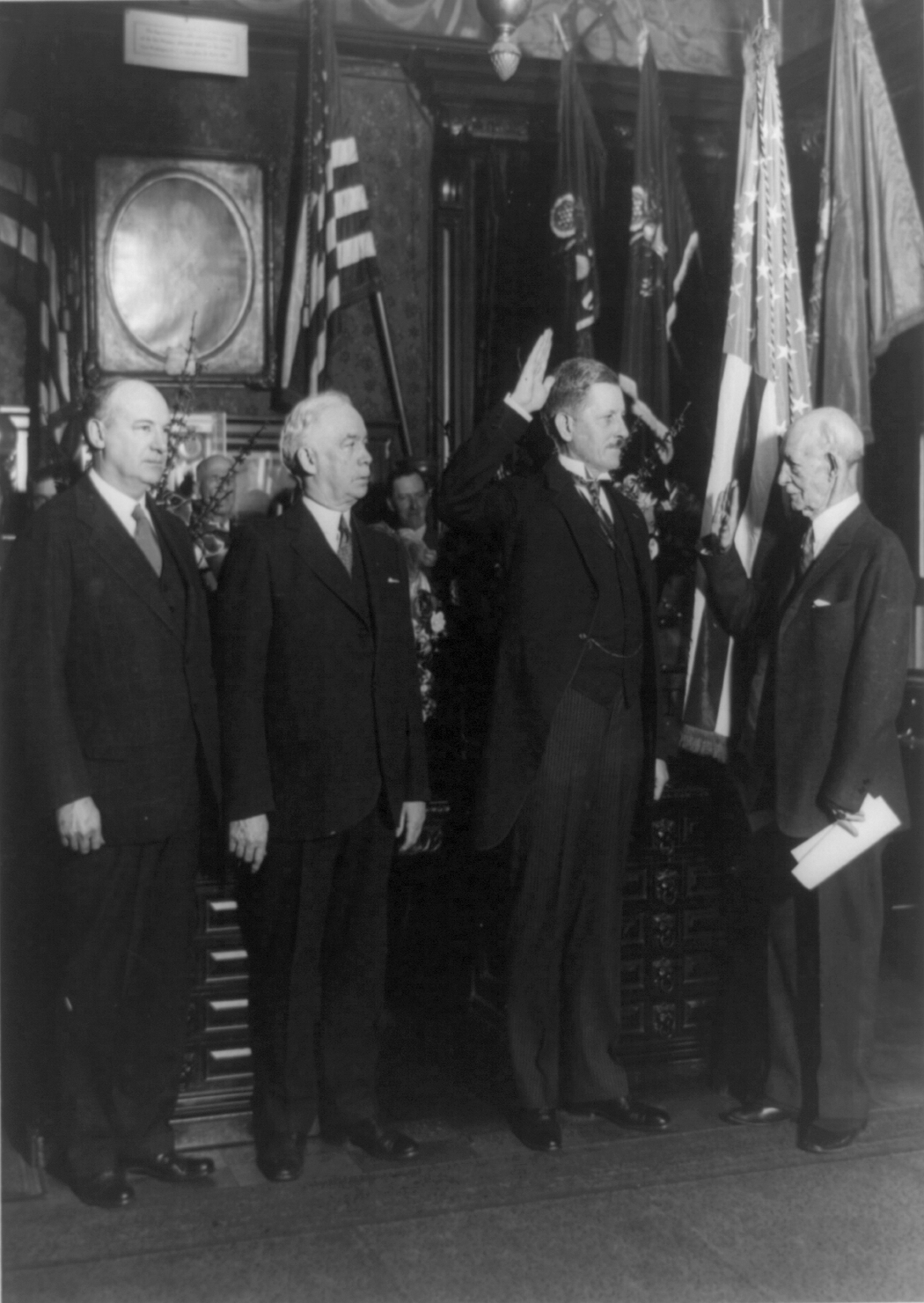
Hurley (second from right) being sworn in as Assistant War Secretary by John B. Randolph. Outgoing Assistant Secretary Charles B. Robbins and Secretary of War James W. Good look on.

Patrick Jay Hurley (January 8, 1883 – July 30, 1963) was an American attorney, Republican Party politician, military officer, and diplomat. He was the 51st United States Secretary of War from 1929 to 1933 in the cabinet of Herbert Hoover and a key American diplomat during World War II. As ambassador to China in 1944 and 1945, Hurley is remembered for his instrumental role in the recall of General Joseph Stilwell in favor of Albert Coady Wedemeyer, his advocacy for a rollback strategy in China, and his public criticism of State Department policy at the onset of the Second Red Scare. He was the first Oklahoman to serve in a presidential cabinet.

Hurley came from humble origins, born to Irish immigrant parents in Indian Territory (today Oklahoma). He worked as a mule driver and with Will Rogers as a cowboy. He attended Indian College in Muskogee and the National University School of Law in Washington, DC before opening a legal practice in Tulsa in 1908. Specializing in oil and gas law and investing heavily in real estate, Hurley achieved rapid success. He was elected president of the Tulsa Bar Association in 1911. He was also helped by his connections in the Republican Party. After Hurley unsuccessfully ran for the Oklahoma House of Representatives in 1910, President William Howard Taft appointed him as the national attorney for the Choctaw Nation.

Hurley was wounded in World War I and received the Silver Star. After the war, he returned to Tulsa, where he continued to enhance his political and business profile. After Hurley chaired Herbert Hoover's presidential campaign in Oklahoma, Hoover appointed him Assistant Secretary of War in 1929. He was shortly promoted to Secretary of War following the death of James W. Good in November and served until Hoover left office in 1933. He was recalled from private life in 1941 following American entry in to World War II and promoted to brigadier general. He served as a personal diplomatic representative for President Franklin D. Roosevelt in China, Iran, Afghanistan, and the Soviet Union, becoming the first foreigner granted Soviet permission to visit the Eastern Front, and was briefly United States Minister to New Zealand in 1942.

In 1944, Roosevelt appointed Hurley as United States Ambassador to China. He was tasked with mediating the factions of the Chinese Civil War in order to unify the country against the Empire of Japan. Hurley came to strongly favor the Kuomintang and Chiang Kai-shek in the conflict, believing that they could win both the civil war and war with Japan with sufficient American support. He was also critical of British and European imperialism in the region. Frustrated by concessions to the Soviet Union at the Yalta Conference and believing that Communist victory in China was inevitable, Hurley resigned in 1945 and publicized his concerns that high-ranking members of the State Department were too sympathetic to the Chinese communist cause.

Returning to the United States, Hurley settled in New Mexico, where he became a leader of the New Mexico Republican Party. He was unsuccessfully nominated as a candidate for United States Senate in 1946, 1948, and 1952 and founded the United Western Minerals Company. He died in Santa Fe, New Mexico in 1963.

== Early life, education, and World War I ==
Patrick was born near Lehigh in the Choctaw Nation in Indian Territory on January 8, 1883, to Pierce O'Neil and Mary Kelly Hurley. His parents immigrated to the United States from Ireland and settled in Indian Territory. He started working as a mule driver for coal mines at age 11 alongside his father and at age 15 attempted to enlisted in the Rough Riders during the Spanish-American War, but was turned away for being too young. After failing to enlist, he worked as a cowboy and met his lifelong friend Will Rogers. He worked while attending Indian College (now Bacone College) where he graduated in 1905. He received his law degree from the National University School of Law, Washington, in 1908.

=== Law practice ===
He started a law practice in Tulsa, Oklahoma in 1908 specializing in oil and gas law and heavily invested in local real estate. He was an active member of the Republican Party and campaigned for Oklahoma House of Representatives in 1910, but lost the election. In 1911 he was elected as the president of the Tulsa Bar Association and he was appointed national attorney for the Choctaw Nation by President William Howard Taft. In 1916, he won a lawsuit to keep the Mississippi Band of Choctaw Indians from enrolling as members of the Choctaw Nation.

He received a second law degree, from George Washington University, in 1913. While attending George Washington University he was initiated into Epsilon chapter of the Sigma Chi fraternity. An active alumni, Hurley served as the 34th Grand Consul of Sigma Chi from 1946 to 1948.

=== Pancho Villa Expedition and World War I ===
Hurley enlisted in the Indian Territorial Volunteer Militia in 1903 and he later served in the Oklahoma National Guard. In 1916, he was called to active duty and participated in the Pancho Villa Expedition. After the expedition, he was assigned to the Judge Advocate General's Corps and assigned to Washington D.C. During World War I, Hurley served with the Judge Advocate General's Corps of the 6th Army Corps, American Expeditionary Force, in France and helped negotiate with Luxembourg for the passage of allied troops through the neutral country. He was also awarded the Army Distinguished Service Medal.

In November 1918, Hurley was detached to the 76th Field Artillery Regiment and participated it in the battles near Louppy-le-Château, France. Hurley was wounded and awarded with Silver Star.

== Interwar years ==
Hurley returned to the United States in 1919. He married Ruth Wilson, daughter of Henry Braid Wilson, in Washington D.C. that year before returning to Oklahoma. The couple would have four children. He assisted with the response to the Tulsa Race Massacre in 1921 and was active in Tulsa where he served as president of the First Trust and Savings Bank and the receiver for the Gilliland Oil Company. He chaired the 1926 Republican Party of Oklahoma convention. Many of the developments Hurley financed in Tulsa included racially discriminatory covenants barring non-white residents.

=== Hoover administration ===
Hurley chaired Herbert Hoover's presidential campaign in Oklahoma in 1928. After Hoover's inauguration the following year he was appointed Assistant Secretary of War by President Herbert Hoover in 1929. The same year, he opened the Ambassador Hotel in Tulsa. He was promoted to Secretary of War after the death of James William Good and served in Hoover's cabinet until 1933. He was the first Oklahoman to serve in a presidential cabinet.

=== Post-administration ===
After Hoover left office, Hurley remained influential by playing a key role in the Interstate Oil Compact of 1935. In 1939, he represented Sinclair Oil Corporation in negotiations for compensation after the Mexican oil expropriation.

== World War II ==
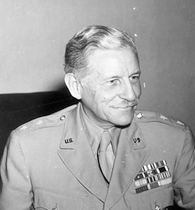
Major General Hurley in 1944

Hurley received a promotion to brigadier general (from colonel in the reserves) in 1941 when the United States entered World War II, and General George C. Marshall, the U.S. Army Chief of Staff, dispatched him to the Far East as a personal representative to examine the feasibility of relieving American troops besieged on the Bataan peninsula. Dwight Eisenhower, a staff officer in Washington, sent Hurley to Australia with $10 million in cash, to arrange supplies and charters for the Philippines. According to historian Jean Edward Smith, Eisenhower had served under Hurley for the last three years at the War Department, "needed someone to organise blockade runners for MacArthur, and Hurley, an old-fashioned buccaneer in politics, with energy and decisiveness, was perfect for the job." He was successful in delivering additional food and ammunition to the soldiers on three separate occasions but could not evacuate them.

After the conclusion of this mission, he embarked on a series of assignments as a personal representative of President Franklin Roosevelt. He served as minister to New Zealand in 1942 and then flew to the Soviet Union, the first foreigner to receive permission to visit the Eastern Front. Over the next two years, he visited the Near East, Middle East, China, Iran and Afghanistan on behalf of Roosevelt.

=== Soviet Union ===
Hurley was assigned by Roosevelt to be his personal representative to Joseph Stalin in November 1942. In that capacity, Hurley witnessed Marshall Georgy Zhukov's 19 November counter-attack, Operation Uranus, against Axis forces in Stalingrad. Hurley would tour the battlegrounds around the city during the fighting, often seeing the remains of Romanian forces after having been destroyed by the advancing Soviets, which he claimed the Soviets reported as being German for propaganda reasons. He stayed in the Stalingrad area for ten days before returning to Moscow.

The first and potentially only high-ranking US military officer to be granted access to Soviet combat operations on the Eastern Front, Hurley reported amiable relations with Soviet military officers. He gave his Soviet aides nicknames from Native Americans chiefs, "Rain-in-the-Face" and "Sitting Bull." He also reported that the Soviet generals "were interested in the amount of war supplies–especially planes, tanks, and trucks–that the United States [could] furnish Russia" and that they were adamant that a second front needed to be opened soon.

=== Iran ===
When Hurley arrived in Tehran, he made a great impression by wearing cowboy hats and rejecting normal diplomatic protocols, with many in the Iranian élite used to strict diplomatic protocol saying they had never met a diplomat like Hurley. An Iranian-American historian, Abbas Milani, described Hurley as "an odd and eccentric character" who was "horrified" by the "abject poverty amongst the people and arrogant disdain for the populations by the British and Soviet ambassadors." Hurley, an Anglophobe, felt that the British Empire was a malign force in international affairs, and he believed that Iran's backwardness and poverty was caused by the country being in the British sphere of influence. Hurley often met with Iranian officials, especially the young Shah, Mohammad Reza Pahlavi, who had inherited the Sun Throne only two years earlier. Hurley had the responsibility of organizing preparations on the American side for the Tehran summit in November 1943. Hurley accepted the Soviet claim that there was a German plot to assassinate Roosevelt, which required for Roosevelt and the rest of the American delegation to stay in the Soviet embassy, which allowed the Soviets, who had bugged the rooms of Americans, to listen to their deliberations.

After the Tehran summit, Roosevelt had a long talk with Hurley about the future of Iran and then asked for a report. The Hurley Report argued that Iran was "a country rich in natural resources," with excellent prospects for becoming a nation with a government "based upon the consent of the governed." Hurley argued that Iran's two main problems were the illiteracy of most Iranians and Iran's semi-colonial status to the Soviet Union and Britain. Hurley argued that it was wrong for the United States to spend so much blood and treasure in the war to maintain the decaying British Empire, which needed to go. Hurley ended his report by saying that American policy in Iran should be to end Soviet and British influence in that nation, promote literacy, and sponsor economic development. Roosevelt passed on the Hurley report to British Prime Minister Winston Churchill, with the note "This is for your eyes only. I rather like his general approach."

Milani suggested that Roosevelt had passed along the report to make "mischief," as he must have known that Churchill would not like Hurley's negative remarks about the British Empire or its role in Iran. Churchill, predictably enough, did not like the anti-British tone of the report. In his reply to Roosevelt, he wrote: "I make bold, however, to suggest that British imperialism has spread and is spreading democracy more widely than any other system of government since the beginning of time."

=== China ===
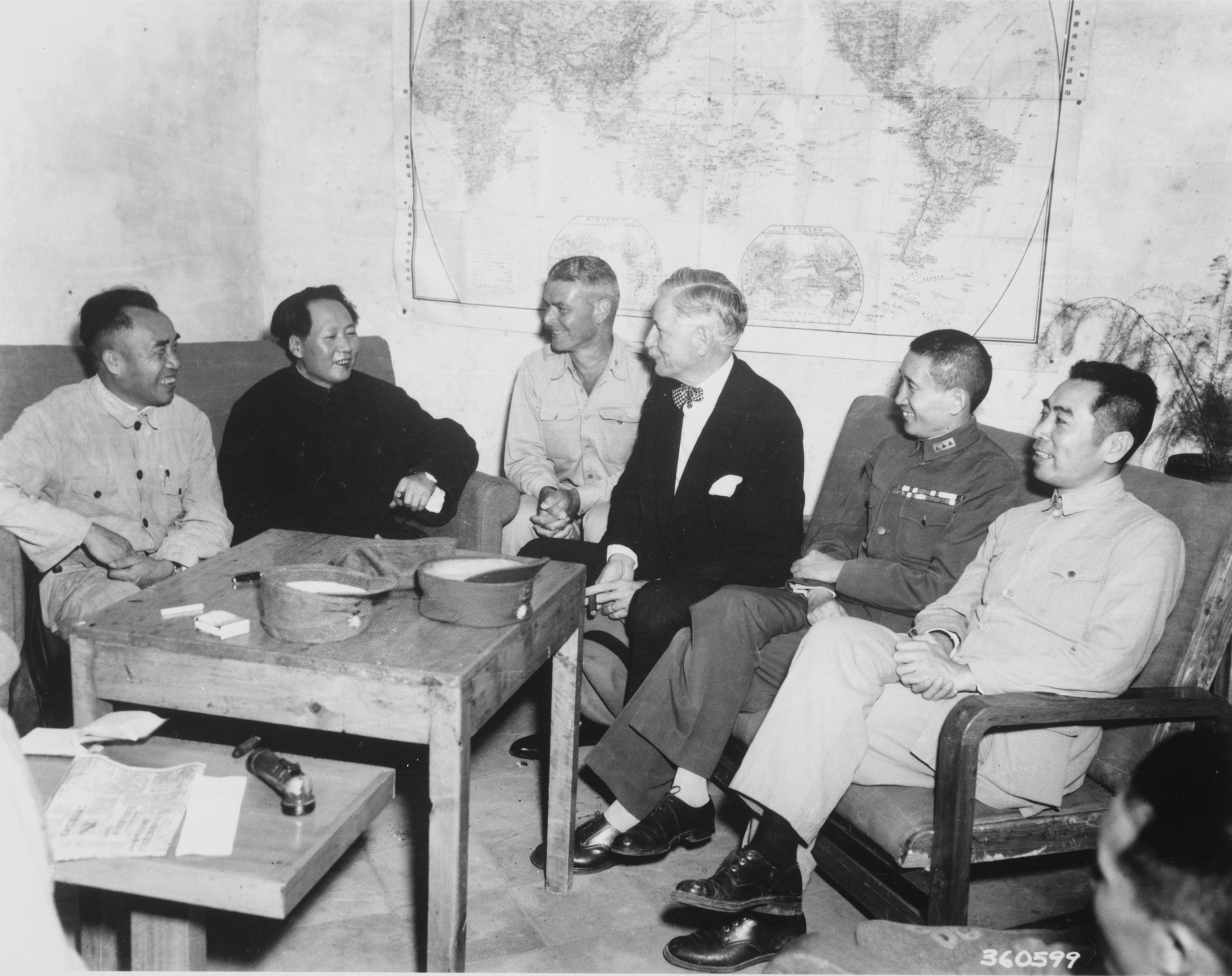
Patrick Hurley at center (in bow tie) with Communist leadership in Chongqing, 1945

In the spring of 1944, the Japanese had launched Operation Ichigo, the biggest Japanese offensive of the entire war. The success of Operation Ichigo brought to a head the long simmering conflict between General "Vinegar Joe" Joseph Stilwell and Generalissimo Chiang Kai-shek. It was that crisis that brought Roosevelt to send Hurley to China.

Hurley arrived in China in August 1944, as a personal envoy from Roosevelt to Chiang. His written directive from the President was as follows:

You are hereby designated as my personal representative with the Generalissimo Chiang Kai-shek, reporting directly to me. Your principal mission is to promote efficient and harmonious relations between the Generalissimo and General [Joseph] Stilwell to facilitate General Stilwell's exercise of command over the Chinese armies placed under his direction. You will be charged with additional missions.

On his way to Chongqing, the capital of the Republic of China at the time, Hurley had stopped in Moscow to meet Joseph Stalin and Vyacheslav Molotov, who claimed to him that Mao and the rest of the Chinese Communists were "margarine Communists" and that the Soviet Union was not associated with them. The claims were accepted by Hurley at face value. Besides getting Chiang to cede more command powers to Stilwell, Hurley was also ordered to ensure that Chinese Communists accepted Stilwell as their commander and to see if it were possible for American Lend-Lease aid to go to Mao Zedong in Yan'an. Eventually, Stilwell's belief in Chiang's incompetence and corruption reached such proportions that Stilwell sought to cut off Lend-Lease aid to China in October 1944.

Hurley maintained that his talks with Foreign Minister of R.O.C T. V. Soong were going well. Hurley warned Stilwell at a meeting at the US embassy in Chongqing that the harsh language of the Stilwell's plan to create a Chinese United Front under his command would offend Chiang. Chiang told Hurley that the Chinese people were "tired of the insults which Stilwell has seen fit to heap upon them" and rejected the plan. In a speech before the Central Executive Committee of the Kuomintang that was leaked to the Chinese press, Chiang denounced Stilwell and said that to accept the American ultimatum would be to accept a new imperialism that would make him no different from the Japanese collaborator Wang Jingwei in Nanking. On 12 October 1944, Hurley reported to Washington that Stilwell was a "fine man, but was incapable of understanding or co-operating with Chiang Kai-shek." He went on to say that if Stilwell remained in command, all of China might be lost to the Japanese. Before sending his cable, Hurley showed it to Stilwell, who accused Hurley to his face of "cutting my throat with a dull knife." Hurley eventually came down on the side of Chiang and instead supported the replacement of Stilwell with General Albert C. Wedemeyer.

On 7 November 1944, Hurley visited Yan'an to meet Mao with the aim of creating a united front to unite the Communists and the Kuomintang to fight the Japanese, which Hurley viewed as a chance for personal glory for himself. Chiang wanted Hurley to meet Mao, partly to please Roosevelt and partly because he expected Hurley to fall out with the Communists. When Hurley arrived via plane at Yan'an, he was greeted by Zhou Enlai and Colonel David D. Barrett of the American Dixie Mission to the Communists. When Mao arrived with General Zhu De in a Chevrolet ambulance, Hurley greeted him with a Choctaw war cry "Yahoo!" During the ride back to Yan'an in the ambulance, Hurley using Colonel Barrett, who was fluent in Mandarin, as a translator exchanged stories with Mao about their rural childhoods. Colonel Barrett later recalled that translating General Hurley into Mandarin was difficult "due to the saltiness of the General's remarks, and the unusual language in which he expressed himself. His discourse, in addition, was by no means connected by any readily discernible pattern of thought." Later that night, a banquet was held in Yan'an by the Communist leadership in honor of the Russian Revolution of 1917 during which a drunken Hurley kept interrupting by shouting "Yahoo!" over and over again.

During his talks with Mao, Hurley was told that all of China's problems were the work of the Kuomintang. Mao called for a coalition government, a joint military council with an equal number of Communist and Kuomintang generals, US military aid to the Chinese Red Army, and the freeing of all political prisoners, most notably Marshal Zhang Xueliang, the "Young Marshal" and former warlord of Manchuria who had kidnapped Chiang in 1936, during the Xi'an incident. Hurley informed Mao that he agreed and during the third day of the talks, Hurley added in demands for democracy and liberty to the draft declaration written by the Communists. Colonel Barrett remembered: "The Chinese traditionally do not much show their feelings in their faces, but it was evident from their expressions that they were greatly pleased". Mao and Hurley both signed the declaration with Hurley proudly writing next to his name "Personal Representative of the President of the United States".

When Hurley returned to Chongqing, Chiang was furious with the declaration that Hurley had signed without even informing Chiang. Soong told Hurley he had been "sold a bill of goods by the Communists" and Chiang would never agree to the declaration. Chiang then accepted the declaration if he was given complete power of command over the Red Army, a demand that Mao rejected. When Hurley tried to persuade Mao in a letter to accept the declaration with Chiang's proviso, under the grounds the Communists would "get a foot in the door," Mao replied in a letter that "A foot in the door means nothing if the hands are tied behind the back." Mao called Chiang a "turtle's egg" (an extremely insulting term in China) and threatened to publish the declaration that Mao and Hurley had signed. The publication of the Mao-Hurley declaration would have been extremely embarrassing for Hurley, who signed the declaration making commitments on behalf of Chiang without even informing Chiang of what he was doing and would have raised questions in the press about Hurley's basic competence as a diplomat. When Barrett translated Mao's threat, Hurley looked confused and stunned before shouting at the top of his lungs over and over again, "he tricked me!" When he calmed down, Hurley then repeated an old Oklahoma folk saying: "Why do the leaves turn red in the fall? Because they were so green in the spring."

After Hurley had implored Mao in a letter not to publish the declaration, Mao held back for the moment. Hurley blamed the failure of his mission on Soong and accused him of turning Chiang against Hurley.

In early November 1944, upon the resignation of Ambassador Clarence E. Gauss, Hurley was officially offered the ambassadorship to China but initially declined "with a statement that the duties he had been called upon to perform in China had been the most disagreeable that he had ever performed--and further, he felt that his support of Chiang Kai-shek and the National Government of China had increased the opposition directed toward himself by the un-American elements in the State Department." Upon receiving a telegram from Roosevelt on November 17, urging him to take the job because of the critical nature of the situation, he reluctantly accepted. Hurley's appointment was greeted with dismay by the professional diplomats at the embassy in Chongqing, who complained that Hurley knew nothing of China and was out of his depth.

An American war-time intelligence officer, Graham Peck, later wrote, "His handsome aquiline head suggested a Roman burst capriciously passed up with butterflies of a huge bow tie, pinch-nose glasses, curly white mustache and coiffure." Hurley liked to be addressed as "General," always wore all of his medals at public events, and used "we" instead of "I" to address people as if everyone was in agreement with what he was saying, a speaking habit that many found very annoying. Hurley's first acts as ambassador were to buy a new Cadillac and to have the embassy redecorated in a grandiose style that he saw fit for an ambassador of the United States. Hurley did not speak Mandarin, knew nothing of China, pronounced Mao as "Moose Dung," and had a habit of addressing Chiang as "Mr. Shek" (in Chinese, the surname comes first). One American diplomat, Arthur Young, called Hurley "a senile old man who couldn't keep his mind on any subject." An American journalist who went to lunch with Hurley recalled that they spent three hours drinking hard booze before they started to eat while Peck was invited to dinner with the ambassador, who forgot what his name was and had to ask Peck who he was several times. At a dinner with senior diplomats and Chinese leaders, Hurley toasted the journalist Annalee Jacoby, who was present as "the most important person in the world, my tall, blonde goddess of a bride." He went on to give a rambling, sexually explicit speech about their children, all of the joy she had given him, and all the pleasures of having sex with her. Everyone else maintained a stunned silence; Jacoby was a short brunette, was not Mrs. Hurley, and had no children with Hurley—she maintained most vehemently that she had never been the lover of the ambassador. As Hurley saw Chiang more than Mao, it was the former who had the most influence on him. On 2 December 1944, Hurley, in a cable to Washington, argued that China's recent problems were the work of the British who were the "greatest obsolete [sic] to the unification of China."

In January 1945, Hurley met US Rear Admiral Milton E. Miles and the Chinese secret police chief Dai Li, who first informed him of a secret visit to Yan'an by Colonel William Bird of the OSS, of which the ambassador had been unaware. Bird and Barrett of the "Dixie Mission" had offered to have 5,000 American paratroopers land in the Communist base area, and one American division would be landed in Shandong province to link up with the Chinese Red Army. The American officers had told T. V. Soong and the War Minister General Chen Cheng of their plans and naively asked them not to tell Chiang. Chen and Soong promptly informed Chiang, who reacted by having Hurley informed, who predictably enough, was enraged that the OSS should make such an offer without telling him. Hurley accused Bird and Barrett in a cable to Washington of offering recognition to Mao and further accused Wedemeyer of plotting against him. Mao and Zhou both preferred to negotiate with Wedemeyer, which further increased tensions between the ambassador and the general. As Wedemeyer was living at the embassy with Hurley, this made for unpleasant living arrangements; Jacoby later recalled that the two had "loud, noisy quarrels" lasting well into the night and Wedemeyer sent several cables to Washington questioning Hurley's mental fitness to be ambassador. Finally, Hurley refused to speak to Wedemeyer for several days before coming into his room. Wedemeyer recalled, "He sat on the edge of my bed, clasped my right hand in both of his and said he was sorry for his behavior towards me."

Hurley's dealings with the State Department did not improve. Hurley hired two press attaches to improve his image as an ambassador, and American journalists in China who tried to report unfavorable news about Hurley had those sections of their dispatches cut by the censors. Hurley fired much of his staff, most notably John Paton Davies, Jr. When Hurley visited Washington, all of the senior diplomats at the Chongqing embassy sent a joint cable to the State Department for Hurley to be fired, under the grounds that he was incompetent and not entirely sane. Hurley was furious with the cable. Although he had started out as a believer in creating a Communist-Kuomintang "united front" in 1944, he was by 1945 a solid supporter of the Kuomintang and regarded anyone who wanted to talk to Yan'an as his "personal foe." Hurley fired the diplomats who signed the cable asking for his sacking and went on to accuse "the imperialist governments of France, Britain and the Netherlands" as being the ones responsible for all of China's problems.

Roosevelt's February 1945 Yalta Conference with Winston Churchill and Joseph Stalin resulted in a secret agreement in which the Soviet Union was granted concessions in China that the Russian Empire had lost in the Russo-Japanese War in the early 20th century. Hurley believed this was the beginning of the end of a non-Communist China. Hurley, an Anglophobe and anti-imperialist, wanted to eliminate British influence in China. In 1945, Hurley repeatedly suggested for the United States threaten to cease Lend-Lease supplies to Britain until the British promised not to retake Hong Kong, a city that Hurley believed rightfully belonged to China. When the American military attaché suggested in a cable in March 1945 that the Chinese might be willing to accept Hong Kong being liberated from the Japanese by the British, Hurley wrote to Washington that it was "British imperialist propaganda-and while supporters of this propaganda may be entitled to their own views in their premises, I know of no reason why American officers serving in China should undertake to sponsor such propaganda or to disseminate it within the American government." Hurley's relations with General Sir Adrian Carton de Wiart who was Churchill's special envoy to China were not good, as Hurley saw Carton de Wiart as a sinister figure upholding the British Empire, which Hurley wanted to see dismantled. Roosevelt had also sent Hurley to China to keep "an eye on European imperialism," a directive that Hurley took very seriously, believing America had a special mission to end all European power and influence in Asia.

Hurley held out hope that after Roosevelt's death, President Harry S. Truman would recognize what he regarded as the errors of Yalta and rectify the situation, but his efforts in that direction were in vain. After Japan had signed an armistice with the Allies on 2 September 1945, Chiang had suggested a meeting with Mao in Chongqing. The civil war was expected to resume in China, and Chiang wanted to be seen by the Chinese people as having done everything to avoid the civil war before it started again. Mao said he would not fly to Chongqing unless Hurley was on the plane as he believed that otherwise, Chiang would shoot it down. Chiang wrote in his diary: "How comical this is! Never imagined that the Communists could be so chicken-hearted and shameless. Only three days ago communist newspapers and radio denounced Hurley as a reactionary imperialist. This selfsame imperialist has become Mao's guarantor of safety". Hurley was himself suspicious of many of the experts at the embassy in China, calling them "communistically inclined". Hurley's colleagues at the embassy were equally frustrated with him. John F. Melby, a State Department officer, said Hurley was "crazy" and "raised a lot of hell," while General Wedemeyer confided that Hurley's failing health was affecting the ambassador's perspective.

In September 1945, the plane carrying both Hurley and the Communist delegation landed in Chongqing. Hurley was the first man to emerge, who in the words of the British journalist Jonathan Fenby had "a broad smile on his face as he waved his fedora hat in triumph," followed by Mao.

The summit in Chongqing was a failure, as Mao and Chiang both wanted power for themselves, and resumption of civil war in China was imminent. Hurley visited Washington in November 1945 to complain to President Truman that too many "China Hands" in the State Department were sympathetic to Chinese communism and/or European imperialism in Asia.

On November 26, 1945, Hurley submitted a scathing letter of resignation, two hours after his meeting with Truman. Hurley wrote in his letter of resignation, "I requested the relief of the career men who were opposing the American policy in the Chinese Theater of war. These professional diplomats were returned to Washington and placed in the Chinese and Far Eastern Divisions of the State Department as my supervisors. Some of these same career men whom I relieved have been assigned as supervisors to the Supreme Commander in Asia. In such positions most of them have continued to side with the Communist armed party and at times with the imperialist bloc against American policy." In addition to criticizing liberal diplomats, Hurley lashed out against the "imperialist" powers of France, Britain and the Netherlands, whom he accused of seeking to maintain their empires in Asia at the expense of American interests.

== Later life ==
Though Hurley had attempted in 1944 to create a "united front" in China and at times had been very sympathetic towards Mao himself, this was forgotten as Hurley reinvented himself as a hard-right Republican who promptly become to American conservatives a "martyr," an honest diplomat who had been undercut by the supposed "fellow travellers" and Soviet spies in the infiltrated State Department's Soviet spies, who had controlled America's China policy. American conservatives accepted the reinvented Hurley as he was believed to be useful against the Democratic Truman administration.

The Nationalists' defeat by the Communists in the Chinese Civil War in 1949 caught the US by surprise and led to the question "Who Lost China?" to become a popular subject as recriminations set in against the State Department officials' China Hands. In 1950, when Senator Joseph McCarthy accused the State Department of being ridden with Soviet spies who were all "Communists and queers" and were the ones responsible for the United States "losing" China, Hurley publicly endorsed McCarthy's position in a 1950 speech. Hurley stated that his efforts to aid Chiang had been undercut by Roosevelt, whom Hurley portrayed as the puppet of Soviet spy Alger Hiss. Hurley said that at his last meeting with Roosevelt in March 1945, he was "little more than a bag of bones," who was not interested in his claim that the State Department was passing information to "armed Chinese Communists," something that Hurley had not until then "remembered.". Hurley ended his remarks with the claim that Stalin had not broken any agreements "because we cowardly surrendered to him everything he wanted and we did it in secret. ... Yalta was the State Department's blueprint for the Communist conquest of China!"

Hurley was the Republican candidate for a seat in the United States Senate for the state of New Mexico in 1946, 1948 and 1952, but he lost all three attempts against the Democratic nominees. Hurley started the United Western Minerals Corporation of Santa Fe, New Mexico. It was involved in the rush to start uranium mining in the Ambrosia Lake region of New Mexico in the 1950s.

== Legacy ==
Both contemporary and modern assessments of Hurley are critical of his record.

Albert Coady Wedemeyer, commander of American forces in China after General Stilwell, once noted that Hurley's failing health in 1944-1945 could be affecting his abilities as American ambassador to China. As Mao and Zhou Enlai also preferred to negotiate with General Wedemeyer rather than Hurley, this made for difficult living arrangements as Wedemeyer and Hurley both lived at the US embassy in Chongqing; contemporaries recalled "loud, noisy quarrels" lasting well into the night and Wedemeyer sent several cables to Washington questioning Hurley's mental fitness to be ambassador. These quarrels were particularly heated following the revelation that some personnel of the "Dixie Mission" and the OSS secretly visited Yan'an prior to Japanese surrender to offer the Communists military support; Hurley was enraged that the OSS would make such an offer without consulting with him, and he accused individual "Dixie Mission" personnel by name in a cable to Washington of offering recognition to Mao and accused Wedemeyer of plotting against him.

Jonathan Fenby notes that at a summit in November 1944, Hurley unilaterally agreed to all demands made by the Mao-led Chinese Communists on behalf of Chiang Kai-shek and the Kuomintang without consulting Chiang or any of the Kuomintang membership. This was shortly followed by Chiang's demands for a proviso to the agreement, which was not accepted by the Communists; Hurley blamed the resultant failure of the summit's negotiation, which had the potential to be extremely embarrassing to Hurley and raise questions about his competence as a diplomat, on personnel close to Chiang.

Michael Burleigh wrote, "US policy was not well served by its Ambassador to China from late 1944 onwards, a former Republican secretary of war called Patrick Hurley, a drunken idiot given to Choctaw war cries. Oblivious of China's delicate protocols, he referred to Chiang as 'Mr. Shek' and Mao Zedong as 'Moose Dung' in the course of shuttle trips designed to bring the two together to convert China into a springboard for the final showdown with the Japanese. Mao's cronies called Hurley 'the Clown'; his US diplomatic colleagues dubbed him 'the Albatross.'"

Aside from Hoover himself, Hurley was the last living member of the Hoover administration.

== Decorations ==
Major General Hurley served in two World Wars and received many decorations for bravery and distinguished service. The following is a list of his decorations:

Army Distinguished Service Medal with oak leaf cluster
Silver Star
Legion of Merit
Distinguished Flying Cross
Purple Heart
World War I Victory Medal with three battle clasps
Army of Occupation of Germany Medal
American Defense Service Medal
American Campaign Medal
European-African-Middle Eastern Campaign Medal
Asiatic Pacific Campaign Medal with two service Stars
World War II Victory Medal
Order of the White Eagle

== Sources ==
- Russel D. Buhite, Patrick J. Hurley and American Foreign Policy, Ithaca, NY: Cornell University Press, 1973. ISBN 0-8014-0751-6
- Don Lohbeck, Patrick J. Hurley, Chicago: Henry Regnery Company, 1956.
- Merle Miller, "Plain Speaking: an oral biography of Harry S. Truman", New York, NY; Berkley Publishing Company, 1974. pp. 251–252.

Political offices
Preceded by James Good	United States Secretary of War; 1929–1933	Succeeded by George Dern
Diplomatic posts
New office	United States Minister to New Zealand; 1942	Succeeded by William C. Burdett
Preceded by Clarence E. Gauss	United States Ambassador to China; 1945	Succeeded by Leighton Stuart
Party political offices
Preceded by Albert K. Mitchell	Republican nominee for US Senator from New Mexico (Class 1); 1946, 1952	Succeeded by Forrest Atchley
Preceded by Benson Newell	Republican nominee for US Senator from New Mexico (Class 2); 1948	Succeeded by Edwin L. Mechem
National Rifle Association of America
Preceded by L. M. Rumsey Jr.	President of the NRA; 1929	Succeeded by Benedict Crowell
