= James W. Good =

American politician

James Good
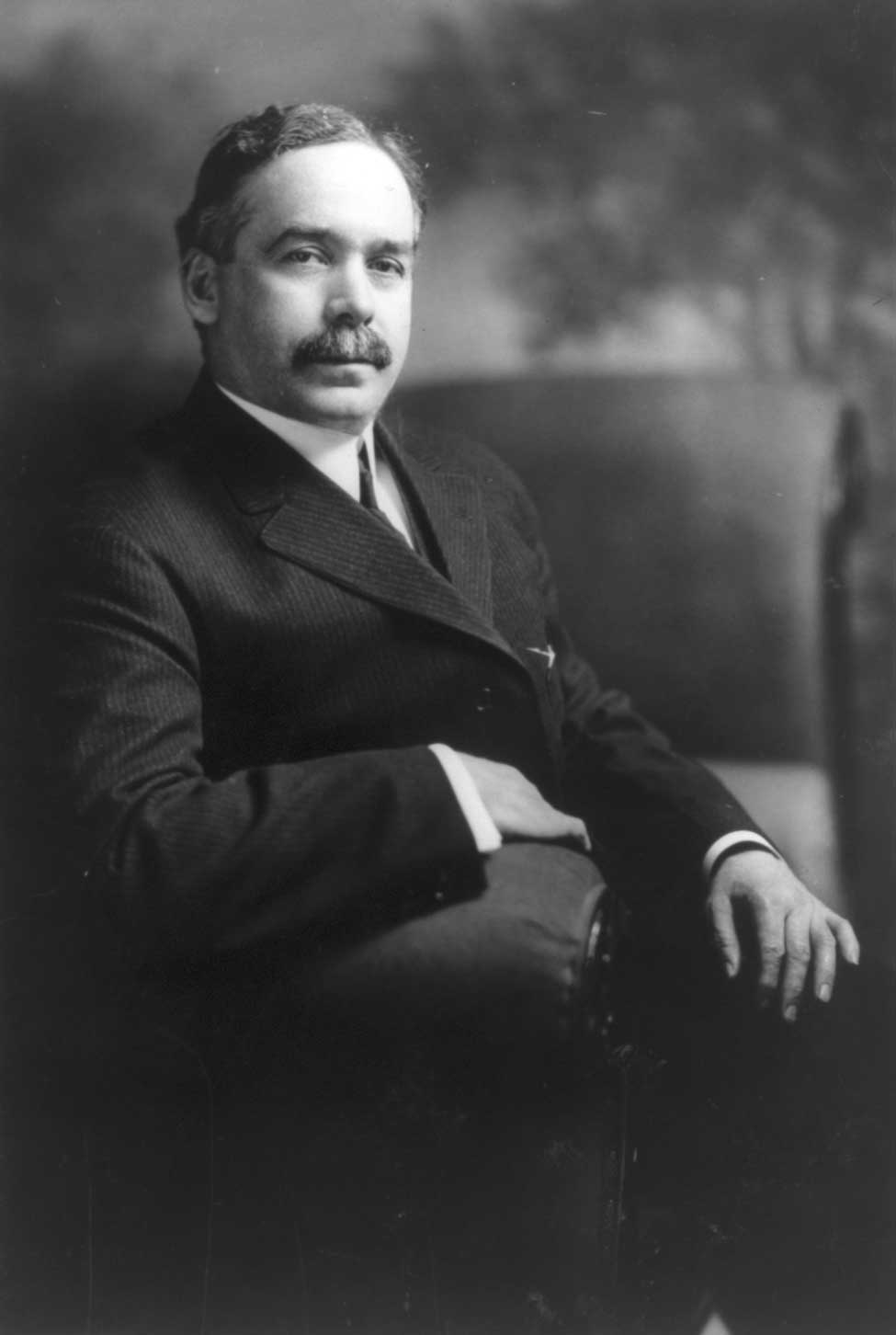
- 1919 portrait photograph of Good

50th United States Secretary of War
- In office March 6, 1929 – November 18, 1929
- President: Herbert Hoover
- Preceded by: Dwight F. Davis
- Succeeded by: Patrick J. Hurley

Member of the U.S. House of Representatives from Iowa's 5th district
- In office March 4, 1909 – June 15, 1921
- Preceded by: Robert G. Cousins
- Succeeded by: Cyrenus Cole

City Attorney of Cedar Rapids
- In office 1906–1908
- Preceded by: John M. Hughes
- Succeeded by: John M. Redmond

Personal details
- Born: James William Good; September 24, 1866 Cedar Rapids, Iowa, U.S.
- Died: November 18, 1929 (aged 63) Washington, D.C., U.S.
- Party: Republican
- Spouse: Lucy Good
- Children: 2
- Education: Coe College (BA); University of Michigan, Ann Arbor (LLB)

James William Good (September 24, 1866 – November 18, 1929) was an American politician and lawyer from the state of Iowa, who served in the U.S. House of Representatives and the Cabinet of President Herbert Hoover as Secretary of War. He was a member of the Republican Party.

== Biography ==
James William Good was born near Cedar Rapids, Iowa, to Henry and Margaret Combs Good. He studied at Coe College, graduating in 1892. He later studied at University of Michigan Law School, graduating in 1893. He was admitted to the bar in 1893 and began practice in Indianapolis, Indiana, the same year. He married Lucy Deacon on October 4, 1894. They had two sons, James William Jr. and Robert Edmund Good.

In 1896, Good returned to Cedar Rapids, where he continued to practice law. Good served as the Cedar Rapids City Attorney from 1906 to 1908.

Good was a member of the United States House of Representatives from 1909 to 1921, where he represented Iowa's 5th congressional district (then made up of Linn, Grundy, Benton, Marshall, Tama, Jones, and Cedar counties). He became chairman of the House Appropriations Committee in 1919, and continued to serve in that position until the end of his service. He was re-elected six times, and never defeated. But soon after his fellow Republican, Warren G. Harding, was elected president in November 1920, Good disclosed that he would likely resign his seat in Congress and join a Chicago, Illinois, law firm, once Good's plan to reorganize the budgetary process was adopted. Good resigned on June 10, 1921. Republican Cyrenus Cole of Cedar Rapids won a special election to fill his vacancy, and was sworn on August 1, 1921.

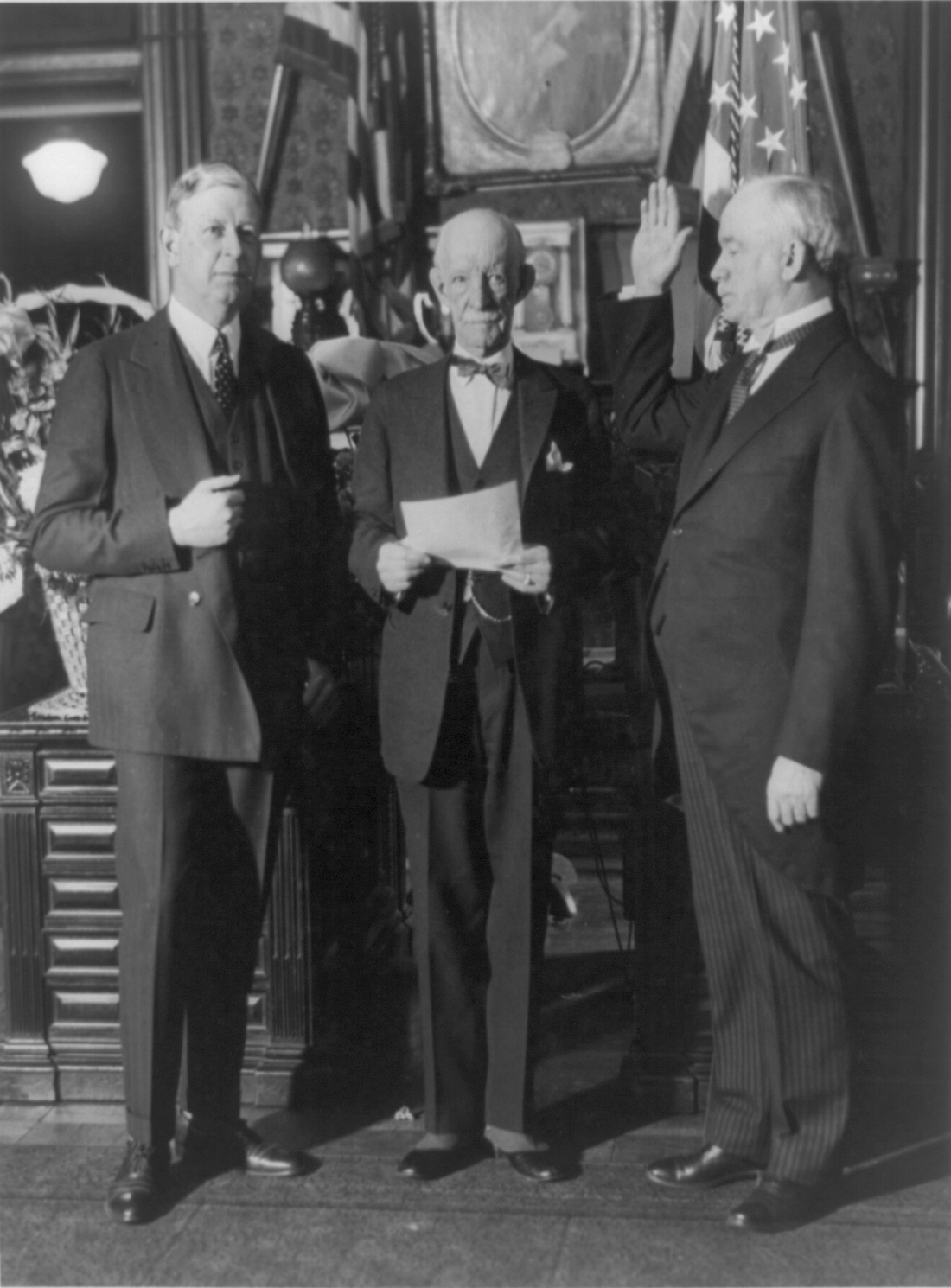
Good (right) being to sworn in as the Secretary of War, by John B. Randolph. Outgoing with former Secretary of War Dwight F. Davis (left).

In 1928 Good worked to elect Herbert Hoover, a fellow Iowa Republican, as President of the United States. When Hoover took office in March 1929, he appointed Good to be the United States Secretary of War and Good was soon confirmed by the United States Senate. He served in that position for eight months until his sudden death from peritonitis caused by a ruptured appendix.

He died in Washington, D.C., on November 18, 1929, shortly after the Wall Street crash of 1929, at the beginning of the Great Depression. He was succeeded by the Under Secretary of War Patrick J. Hurley.

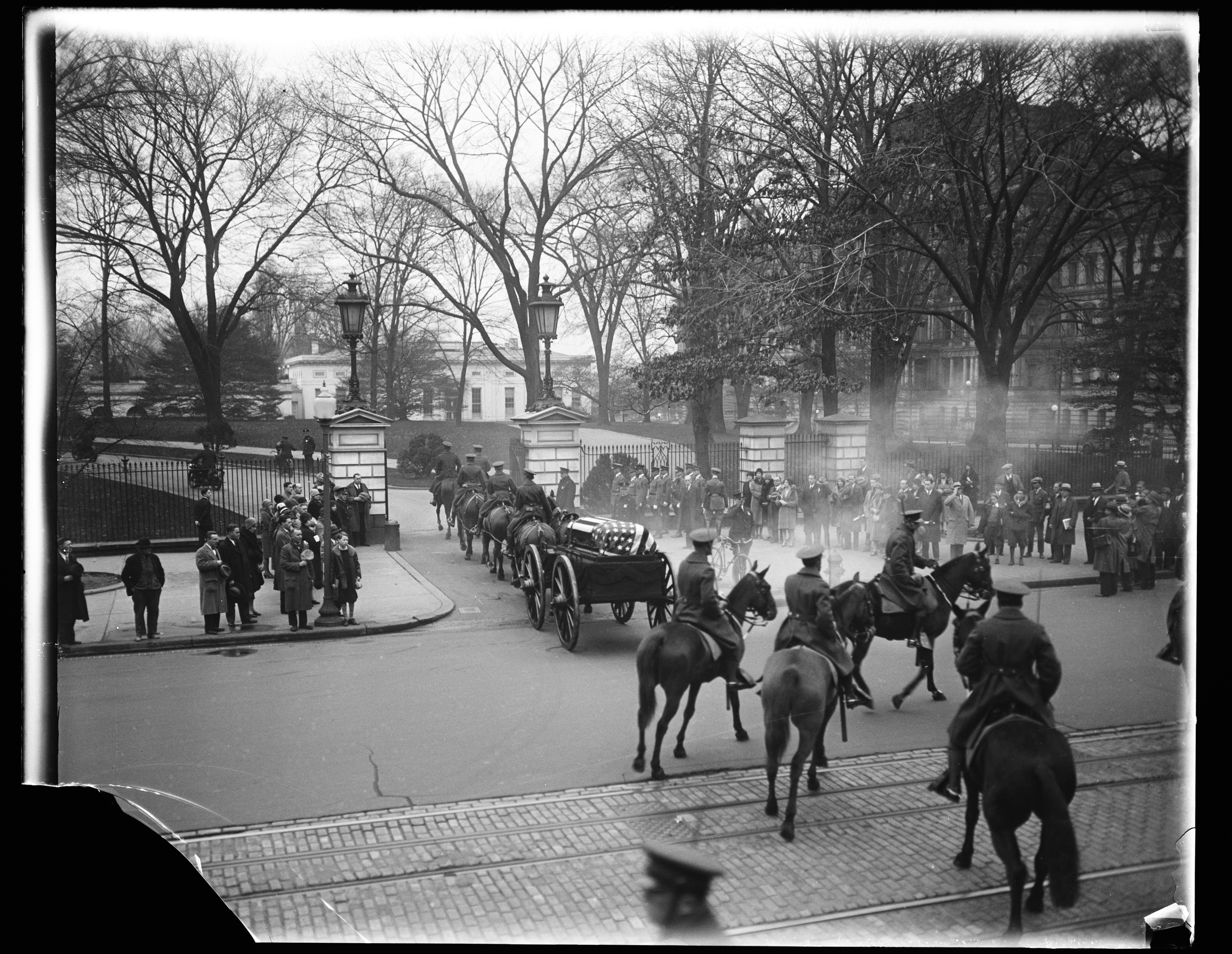
Good's funeral in 1929

U.S. House of Representatives
Preceded by Robert G. Cousins	Member of the U.S. House of Representatives from Iowa's 5th congressional district 1909–1921	Succeeded by Cyrenus Cole
Preceded by J. Swagar Sherley	Chair of the House Appropriations Committee; 1919–1921	Succeeded by Charles Davis
Political offices
Preceded by Dwight F. Davis	United States Secretary of War; 1929	Succeeded by Patrick J. Hurley
