= John Carter Vincent =

American diplomat

United States Consul General to Morocco
- In office June 26, 1951 – April 16, 1953
- President: Harry S. Truman; Dwight D. Eisenhower
- Preceded by: Edwin A. Plitt
- Succeeded by: Joseph C. Satterthwaite

United States Minister to Switzerland
- In office October 21, 1947 – June 9, 1951
- President: Harry S. Truman
- Preceded by: Leland B. Harrison
- Succeeded by: Richard Cunningham Patterson Jr.

Personal details
- Born: August 19, 1900 Seneca, Kansas, U.S.
- Died: December 3, 1972 (aged 72) Cambridge, Massachusetts, U.S.
- Education: Mercer University

John Carter Vincent (August 19, 1900 – December 3, 1972) was an American diplomat, Foreign Service Officer, and China Hand. He was forced to resign after accusations that he was a communist.

== Early life ==
Born in Seneca, Kansas, Vincent graduated from Mercer University in 1923 and was appointed a Foreign Service Officer the same year. He then served in Changsha, Hankou, Shantou, Beijing, Shenyang, Nanjing, and Dalian before he became Counsellor to the US Embassy in Chongqing in 1942.

== Wartime activities ==
Vincent was among the China Hands who wanted to gather intelligence from and provide material to the Communist armies, then part of the Allied coalition in the war against Japan and ostensibly under Chiang Kai-shek's command. When Vincent and other China Hands including John Service accompanied Vice-president Henry A. Wallace on a state visit to the Soviet Union and Chongqing in June 1944, he helped to persuade Chiang to finally grant permission for the Dixie Mission, which opened contact with the Communist base areas. According to The New York Times,

The China experts, traveling through the areas controlled by various warlords, reported that Chiang's Nationalist Party, the Kuomintang, was dragging its feet, reserving its American-supplied arms for an eventual showdown with the Communists. The old China hands predicted that in such a fight, the Communists would win. They called instead for American pressure on Chiang to reform his Government and direct his forces against the Japanese, in cooperation with the Communists. "Selfish and corrupt, incapable and obstructive," were a few of the words Mr. Service used to describe the Chiang Government in a 1944 memo to General Stilwell. Vincent and the China Hands also argued that the Chinese Communists had their own genuine domestic roots that might trump any ideological loyalty to the USSR, as was occurring at the time with Tito's Yugoslavia. The defenders of the China Hands argued that it was exactly this perspective in China policy that Nixon and Kissinger began to implement in 1972.

== Postwar career ==
He became Director of the Bureau of Far Eastern Affairs in 1945 and then envoy to Switzerland in 1947 to 1951. He was diplomatic agent in Tangier 1951 to 1952.

== Fall from office ==
In 1951, Vincent was attacked by US Senator Joseph McCarthy and accused of having been a member of the Communist Party by former party activist Louis F. Budenz. Budenz believed in summer 1951 that Vincent had been a member of the party. Bundez admitted that he had no proof but claimed to have learned that from having overheard other party leaders, who were discussing the anticommunism of Ambassador Patrick Hurley. They disliked Hurley and hoped that Vincent would be his replacement.

Similar accusations were made against all the China Hands because of their allegations of ineptitude and corruption of Chiang's regime. After having been cleared by numerous administrative security panels of any disloyalty, in December 1952, the Civil Service Loyalty Review Board found reasonable doubt on Vincent's loyalty by a margin of one vote. In 1953, Secretary John Foster Dulles requested Vincent's resignation. Dean Acheson, Truman's Secretary of State, steadfastly defended Vincent, just as he had done for Alger Hiss, and thought that the China Hands generally were being unfairly and demagogically maligned for honestly conveying inconvenient facts. Acheson tried to intervene with Dulles to save Vincent's career.

== Later life ==
Vincent retired to Cambridge, Massachusetts, where he died on December 3, 1972.

== Sources ==
- Gary May, China Scapegoat: The Diplomatic Ordeal of John Carter Vincent (Washington, DC: New Republic Books, 1979).
