= Cyrenus Cole =

American politician (1863–1939)

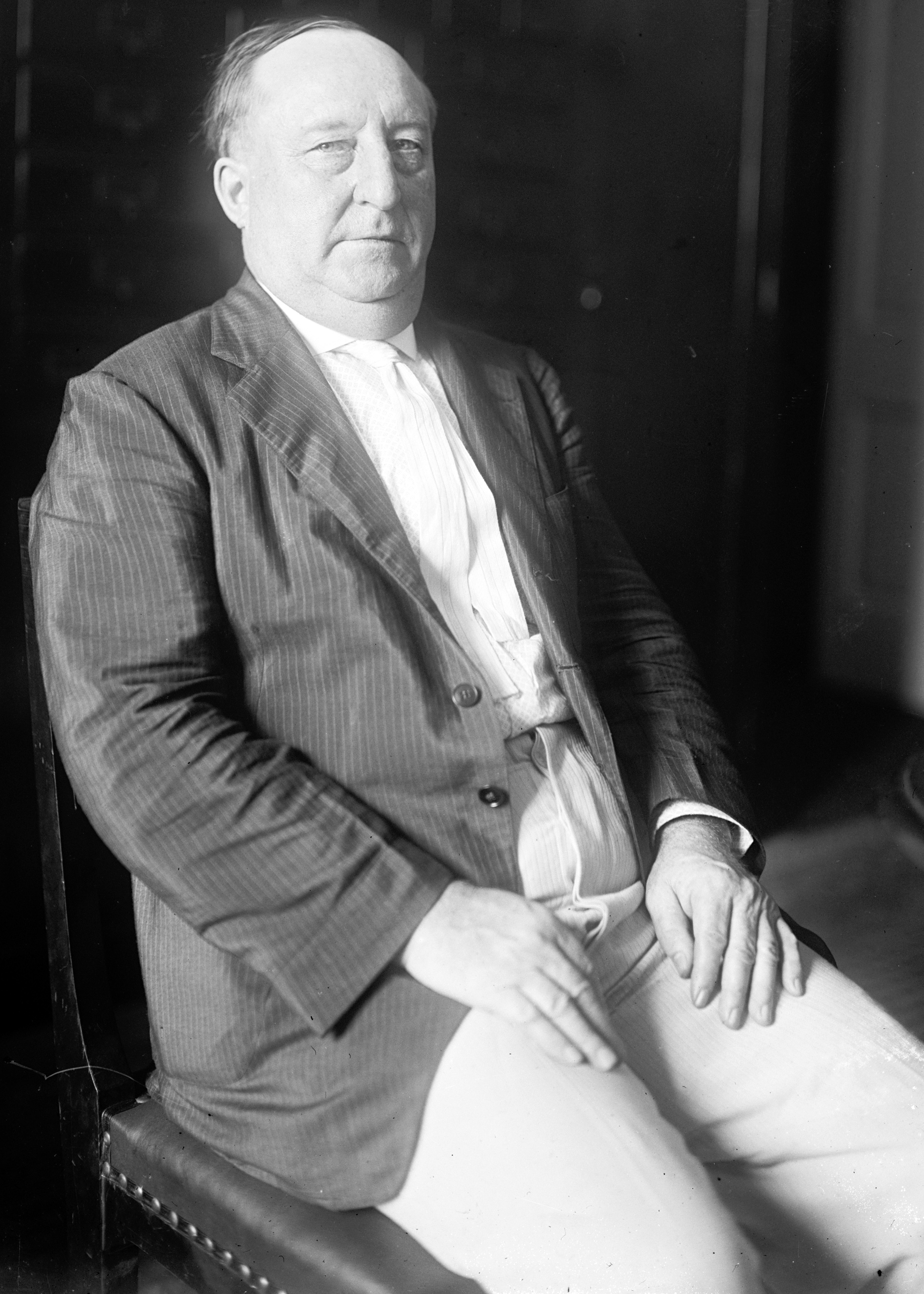

Member of the U.S. House of Representatives from Iowa's 5th district
- In office August 1, 1921 – March 3, 1933
- Preceded by: James W. Good
- Succeeded by: Lloyd Thurston

Personal details
- Born: January 13, 1863 Pella, Iowa, U.S.
- Died: November 14, 1939 (aged 76) Washington, D.C., District of Columbia, U.S.
- Party: Republican
- Education: Central College
- Occupation: Newspaper editor

Cyrenus Cole (January 13, 1863 – November 14, 1939) was a newspaper editor, columnist and historian, then a Republican U.S. Representative from Iowa's 5th congressional district for over eleven years.

Born near Pella, Iowa, Cole graduated from Central College in Pella in 1887. He was an associate editor at The Iowa State Register, then the editor and (until 1913) co-owner of The Cedar Rapids Republican. He was also the author of many books, including "A History of the People of Iowa," "Iowa Through the Years," and "The Farmer in Politics and Prosperity." He also owned two farms near Pella.

While serving as editor, Cole was very active in the stand-patters faction of the Iowa Republican Party, a "more" conservative alternative to the party's progressive wing.

In late 1920, James W. Good, the Republican U.S. Representative for Iowa's 5th congressional district (which included Cedar Rapids) indicated he would resign the following year. Cole easily prevailed in the district convention called to nominate a Republican candidate to fill the vacancy, and defeated his Democratic adversary in the July 1921 race. Cole was sworn into office on August 1, 1921, as a member of the 67th Congress.

Cole won re-election four times, but by increasingly narrow margins in 1928 and 1930. He was considered a "dry" (supporter of prohibition) in the ongoing legislative controversy over the repeal of prohibition. In 1932, he elected not to seek re-election, following reapportionment that left him and another incumbent ("wet" Democrat Bernhard M. Jacobsen of Clinton) in a reconstituted 2nd congressional district that included several new counties in which Cole's "dry" stance on prohibition was unpopular. Jacobsen, and many other Democrats, won in the Roosevelt landslide. In all, Cole served in Congress from August 1, 1921 to March 3, 1933.

Cole returned to writing, publishing several more books, including his memoirs. He died on November 14, 1939, in Washington, D.C., and was interred in the First Dutch Reform Church Cemetery, near Pella.

U.S. House of Representatives
Preceded by James W. Good	Member of the U.S. House of Representatives from Iowa's 5th congressional district August 1, 1921–March 3, 1933	Succeeded by Lloyd Thurston
