= Philip D. Sprouse =

American diplomat

Philip Dodson Sprouse (September 27, 1906 Green Brier, Tennessee - April 28, 1977 San Francisco, California) was a Foreign Service Inspector for the US State Department (1959–1962) before becoming the Ambassador to Cambodia (1962–1964).

Sprouse accompanied General George C. Marshall to China (1945–1947) and wrote the mission's final report. He returned to China later in 1947, this time with General Albert C. Wedemeyer' In 1949 Sprouse participated in the preparation of the White Paper that sought to explain the reasons for the Chinese Communist Revolution.

Sprouse graduated from Washington and Lee University in 1928.
