= John Paton Davies Jr. =

American diplomat (1908–1999)

- Born: April 6, 1908; Sichuan, Qing China
- Died: December 23, 1999 (aged 91); Asheville, North Carolina
- Military career
- Allegiance: United States of America
- Rank: Political Attaché
- Awards: Medal of Freedom
- Other work: Furniture Manufacturing

John Paton Davies Jr. (April 6, 1908 – December 23, 1999) was an American diplomat and Medal of Freedom recipient. He was one of the China Hands, whose careers in the Foreign Service were ended by McCarthyism and the reaction to the loss of China.

== Early life and career ==
Davies was born in Sichuan, China, the son of Baptist missionaries John Paton and Helen Elizabeth (MacNeil) Davies Sr. His grandfather was Welsh immigrant and Cleveland drygoods merchant Caleb Davies. He spent two years at the Experimental College at the University of Wisconsin–Madison, one year at Yenching University, then graduated from Columbia University in 1931. He joined the Foreign Service upon graduation and was posted to China in 1933.

During World War II, Davies was assigned as political attaché to General Joseph Stilwell. He began the assignment in February 1942, arriving in the China Burma India Theater (CBI) in March, based mainly in Assam, India and Kunming, China. Upon a short return to Washington, DC, he married Patricia Louise Grady on August 24, 1942, before he returned to India. He served under Stilwell until the general's recall from China in the fall of 1944. Davies was instrumental in the creation of the U.S. Army Observation Group to Yan'an, China, in 1944.

== Dixie Mission ==
The group, commonly known as the Dixie Mission, established the first official diplomatic and military contact between the United States and the Chinese Communists. Many of its members later became victims of McCarthyism. Davies saw the mission as means to prevent or at least to decrease Soviet influence over the Chinese Communists. As time progressed, Davies also saw the Communists as a realistic alternative to the Kuomintang.

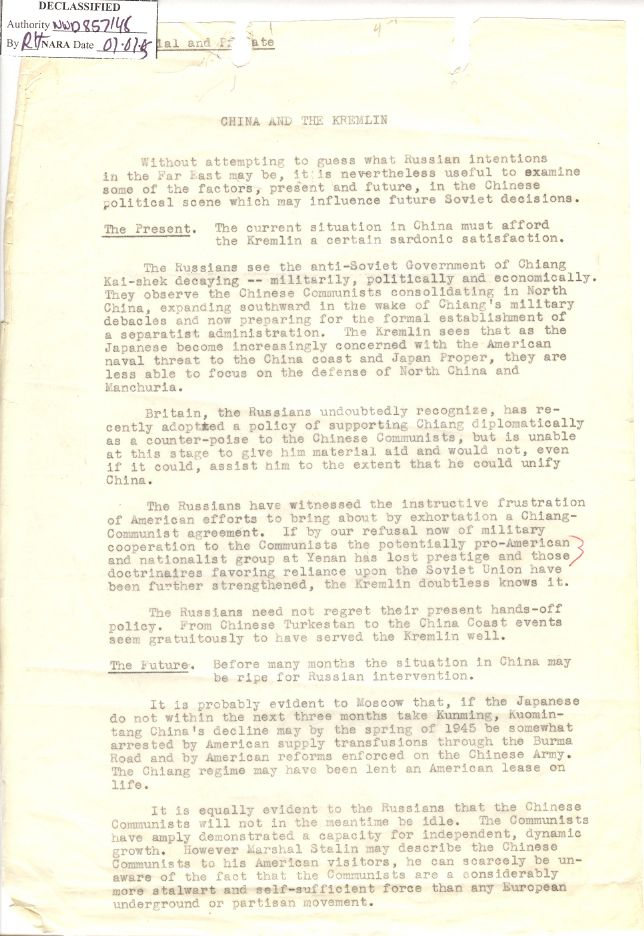
Report by Davies from January 4, 1945, warning of Russian influence over Chinese Communists. Page Two and Page Three

After Stilwell's recall, Davies served briefly under General Albert Coady Wedemeyer and also General Patrick J. Hurley. The last three months of 1944 were to prove his last in China, as Davies found himself increasingly at odds with Hurley, who was appointed acting ambassador to China in mid-November. The main point of contention between the two men was their views on the future of China. Hurley advocated for a unified government of Communists and Nationalists with Generalissimo Chiang Kai-shek at its head. Davies, meanwhile, believed not only that was a coalition impossible to form but also that Chiang's regime was ultimately a dead end for American policy in China. Also, Davies believed that the Communists were the future of China.

Davies visited Yan'an, China, twice. The second trip, in mid-December, resulted in an intense argument with Hurley over Davies's motives. Hurley accused Davies of actively working to undermine Hurley's unification talks between the Communists and the Kuomintang. Hurley undertook work to finalize Davies's transfer out of China to Moscow. A second argument in the first week of January and resulted in Hurley threatening to destroy Davies's career and accusing the Foreign Service Officer of being a communist. Davies departed China for good on January 9, 1945.

== Medal of Freedom ==
Davies and several others, including Eric Sevareid and a Chinese general, were flying from Assam in India to Chongqing in 1943 when the plane developed engine trouble and the occupants were forced to bail out over the Burmese jungle, in an area inhabited by the Naga headhunters. Davies led all the passengers to safety and, in 1948, was awarded the Medal of Freedom.

== Later career ==
After the war, he served as first secretary in charge of the political section at the US embassy in Moscow; on the State Department's policy staff; with the High Commission for Germany; as director of political affairs at the German Embassy; and finally, as counselor and chargé d'affaires at the Peruvian Embassy, until his dismissal in 1954.

== Accusations and dismissal ==
Davies was one of the China Hands who specialized in China and the Far East in the State Department. He predicted that Mao Zedong's Communists would win the Chinese Civil War, and, after they did so in 1949, he advocated US relations with Communist China to forestall a Soviet takeover. These views ran counter to prevailing government policy and provoked the "China lobby". Supporters of Chiang Kai-shek were looking for those who had helped "lose" China and Senator Joseph McCarthy was looking for any Communists in government. Davies was attacked as both. Anticommunist CIA agent and later right-wing book publisher Lyle Munson leaked the information on some of Davies's actions to Alfred Kohlberg, and they ultimately made their way to Robert J. Morris. He was dismissed for this, but placed the blame on Davies, leading to investigations of Davies.

Nine investigations of Davies' loyalty between 1948 and 1954 did not produce evidence of disloyalty or Communist sympathies. His opposition to Communism was a matter of record; indeed, in 1950 he had advocated a preventive nuclear showdown with the Soviet Union. Nevertheless, in 1954, under political pressure from McCarthy and Senator Patrick McCarran, Secretary of State John Foster Dulles asked Davies to resign. He refused, and on November 5, 1954, Dulles fired him, saying he had "demonstrated a lack of judgment, discretion and reliability."

== Later life ==
After the end of his diplomatic career, Davies returned to Peru and, with his wife, operated a furniture business. Their company, Estilo, won the International Design Award twice. The Davies family returned to the United States in 1964. After a protracted battle, Davies was finally exonerated and regained his government clearance in 1969. The family moved to Málaga, Spain in 1972 and then to France and England and finally back to the US.

== Death ==
Davies died December 23, 1999, in Asheville, North Carolina, at the age of 91.

== Books ==
- "The China Hands: American Foreign Service Officers and What Befell Them," E.J. Kahn, Jr. NY Viking Press, 1975. ISBN 9780140043013
- "China Hand: An Autobiography," John Paton Davies, Jr. Philadelphia: University of Pennsylvania Press, 2012. ISBN 978-0-8122-4401-4
- Foreign and Other Affairs (1964) W.W. Norton & Co.
- Dragon by the Tail: American, British, Japanese, and Russian Encounters With China and One Another (1972). W.W. Norton & Co. ISBN 0-393-05455-1.
