= Tianming, Shaanxi =

Tianming 天明镇
- Town
- Location in China
- Coordinates: 32°58′42″N 107°17′41″E
- Country: People's Republic of China
- Province: Shaanxi
- Prefecture-level city: Hanzhong
- County: Chenggu County
- Time zone: UTC+8 (China Standard)

Tianming (Chinese: 天明; pinyin: Tiānmíng) is a town in Chenggu County, Hanzhong, Shaanxi province, China. As of 2018, it had one residential community and 22 villages under its administration.

== See also ==
- List of township-level divisions of Shaanxi
