= John F. Melby =

American-Canadian diplomat and educator (1913–1992)

John Fremont Melby (July 1, 1913 – December 18, 1992) was a United States diplomat, who served in the Soviet Union from 1943 to 1945 and in China from 1945 to 1948. He held other positions with the Department of State until 1953, when he was dismissed as a security risk because of his long and intimate association with the playwright Lillian Hellman, who was accused of communist ties. He later became an academic specializing in Far Eastern affairs.

== Early years ==
Melby was born in Portland, Oregon, on July 1, 1913, to Harry Charles Melby and Helen Fremont. He moved several times in his childhood. He spent part of it in Brazil, where he became fluent in Portuguese and French. He attended Bloomington High School in Bloomington, Illinois, and was graduated from Illinois Wesleyan University in 1934. While at Illinois Wesleyan University, Melby was a member of the Sigma Chi fraternity. He received a master's degree and a doctorate in political science at the University of Chicago.

== Service in the State Department ==
Melby joined the Foreign Service in 1937 and that year took up his first State Department assignment in Juarez, Mexico. In 1938, he married Florence Cathcart, whom he met across the border in El Paso, Texas. His next posting was Caracas, Venezuela, where he served as vice consul from 1939 to 1941. In 1943 he was assigned to the American Embassy in Moscow, where his rank did not allow him to bring his family. He and his wife, the parents of two boys, grew apart during his absence in Moscow and never lived together again.

In 1944, Melby met the playwright, Lillian Hellman, whom President Roosevelt had sent on a cultural good-will mission to Moscow. They were equally committed to the U.S.-Soviet alliance of World War II. They began an affair that lasted several years.

In 1945, he attended the founding conference of the United Nations in San Francisco as liaison officer for the Soviet delegation, handling details ranging from transportation to translations. He described it as the work of "nursemaid, office boy, and messenger." That same year, at the suggestion of U.S. Ambassador to the Soviet Union Averell Harriman, he was sent to China, where Chiang Kai-shek's Nationalist Government was fighting Mao's army, in order to monitor the role of the Soviets in China. He was second secretary and vice consul in Chungking in 1944-1945 and then in the embassy's new location in Nanking in 1946–7, and then second secretary and consul in Nanking in 1947–48. In December 1945, he recorded his assessment of the two sides in his diary:

One of the great mysteries to me is why one group of people retains faith, whereas another from much the same origins and experiences loses it. Over the years the Communists have absorbed an incredible amount of punishment, have been guilty of their own share of atrocities, and yet have retained a kind of integrity, faith in their destiny, and the will to prevail. By contrast the Kuomintang [Nationalists] has gone through astonishing tribulations, has committed its excesses, has survived a major war with unbelievable prestige, and is now throwing everything away at a frightening rate, because the revolutionary faith is gone and has been replaced by the smell of corruption and decay.

He faulted U.S. policy in his diary in June 1948 as the communist victory neared: "All the power of the United States will not stem the tides of Asia, but all the wisdom of which we are capable might conceivably make those tides a little more friendly to us than they are now."

Melby and Hellman found their political views diverging during Melby's years in China. He came to advocate containment of Communism while she was unwilling to hear criticism of the Soviet Union. They became, in one historian's view, "political strangers, occasional lovers, and mostly friends." Her support for Henry Wallace in the 1948 campaign proved an especially sore point. When Wallace blamed the Soviet takeover of Czechoslovakia on U.S. policy, Melby wrote Hellman:

I don't know who is advising Wallace, but he is certainly giving him some bum poop. This latest outburst of his could hardly be more inaccurate. He simply does not know whereof he speaks when his facts are as completely off base as I know they are in this case. It gives one to wonder about the rest.

In March 1948, Melby delivered an address the National Catholic Educational Conference of China in Shanghai, in which he called communism an "iron helmet over the minds of men" and which his hosts called "the strongest public condemnation of communism by an American diplomat so far uttered by an American diplomat in China."

Melby was recalled to Washington and left China on December 15, 1948, as the communists were winning control. On instructions from his State Department superiors, he produced an analysis of the communist revolution in China and, with Charles Yost became a principal author of an influential study known as the China White Paper (1949). He held the view that Chiang and the Nationalists were responsible for the communist victory in China and privately criticized those who shared this belief, but surrendered to the interpretation of the pro-Chiang China Lobby in the U.S. and blamed the communists' success on the U.S. government and especially, on the State Department's China Hands. Because Melby's role in authoring the White Paper was not publicized, he escaped the criticism it received from the China Lobby.

In 1950, he headed a sixteen-person mission, the Joint State-Defense Military Assistance Mission to Southeast Asia, also known as the Melby-Erskine mission, to study the military capabilities and requirements of Southeast Asian nations in light of the threat of communist advances. It was one of the first American missions to Vietnam to assess the struggle of communist insurgents against French colonial rule. Melby's assessment of French efforts was very pessimistic and he advised major changes in the French approach. He nevertheless recommended providing the military aid France was requesting. His policy recommendations were neither heeded nor communicated to the French.

His State Department positions in these years were assistant chief of the division of Philippine Affairs in 1949, officer in charge of Philippine Affairs in 1949–50, and assistant to assistant secretary of state for Far Eastern Affairs from 1950 to 1953.

In January 1951, following his divorce from his first wife, Melby married Hilda Hordern, a State Department employee whom he had first met in China in 1947, when she was secretary to Ambassador John Leighton Stuart.

== Dismissal and security clearance ==
In the 1950s, at the height of American anticommunist sentiment, the State Department investigated whether Melby posed a security risk. The investigation began in September 1951, a week after ex-communist Martin Berkeley told the House Un-American Activities Committee (HUAC) that Hellman had attended an organizational meeting of the Communist Party in 1937. Initially, the issues Melby was asked to address were minor. Then in April 1952, the department stated its one formal charge against Melby: "that during the period 1945 to date, you have maintained an association with one, Lillian Hellman, reliably reported to be a member of the Communist Party." Based on unverified testimony from informants that she was a member of the Communist Party, along with her participation in many communist-front organizations and left-wing advocacy groups, Melby's suitability for government service was questioned, and when Melby appeared before the department's Loyalty Security Board, he was not allowed to contest Hellman's communist affiliation or learn the identity of those who informed against her, only his understanding of her politics and the nature of his relationship with her, including detailed discussion of their occasional renewal of their physical relationship. He never promised to avoid contact with Hellman, but allowed that he had no plans to renew their friendship.

In the course of a series of appeals, Hellman testified before the Loyalty Security Board on his behalf. She offered to answer questions, but the board was not prepared to hear testimony about her politics, which it had already determined on the basis of an FBI investigation. She was only allowed to describe her relationship with Melby. She testified that she had many longstanding friendships with people of different political views and that political sympathy was not a part of those relationships. She described how her relationship with Melby changed over time and how their sexual relationship was briefly renewed in 1950 after a long hiatus: "The relationship obviously at this point was neither one thing nor the other: it was neither over nor was it not over." In summary, she said that:

... to make it black and white would be the lie it never has been, nor do I think many other relations ever are. I don't think it is as much a mystery as perhaps it looks. It has been a ... completely personal relationship of two people who once past being in love also happen to be very devoted to each other and very respectful of one another, and who I think in any other time besides our own would not be open to question of the complete innocence of and the complete morality, if I may say so, of people who were once in love and who have come out with respect and devotion to one another.

After seven hearings, the State Department dismissed him on April 22, 1953. As was its practice, the loyalty board gave no reason for its decision. The entire process went unnoticed by the press. Melby later credited his good relations with the press: "I think among newspapermen there was a kind of conspiracy to protect me."

In December 1960, as the Kennedy Administration took shape, Melby tried to have his security clearance restored, encouraged by the appointment of Dean Rusk, who was familiar with his State Department work, as the new Secretary of State. His longtime friend Averell Harriman was becoming ambassador-at-large. Robert F. Kennedy blocked their efforts. Appeals to State Department officials responsible for administrative matters failed, as did the advocacy of Pennsylvania Senator Joseph S. Clark Jr. on Melby's behalf. HUAC maintained a list of persons it considered ineligible for government employment that overrode State Department views. Melby dropped these efforts in 1966, when he moved to Canada.

Harriman urged Melby to press the issue once again in 1977 at the start of the Carter administration, and Richard Holbrooke lent his support. Secretary of State Edmund Muskie restored Melby's security clearance in December 1980 and hired him to work as a consultant on the Sino-Vietnamese Conflict for several months.

== Later years ==
After his dismissal from the State Department in 1953, Melby was unable to find work for several years. The department blocked him from positions in other government agencies. The political climate made academic institutions wary of hiring former State Department employees, although he held a one-year research fellowship at Yale University's Southeast Asia program for the academic year 1955–56.

From 1956 to 1959, Melby was executive vice chairman of the National Council on Asian Affairs, which promoted the inclusion of Asian studies in secondary school curricula.

From 1956 to 1964, Melby served as the director of foreign studies at the University of Pennsylvania and taught part-time, and full-time in his final year. He stressed the importance of racial integration in U.S. education for the reputation of the U.S. overseas:

No small part of traditional American prestige in Asia has come from our advocacy of "desegregation" for Asians. ... When we are concerned by foreign reactions we would do well to remember that in our position we no longer have a private life, and that what we do at home takes on an enlarged, perhaps often an exaggerated, importance in the eyes of the word as evidence of what an anxious world can expect from us. Undoubtedly what Mississippi does about its school system worries New Delhi more than it does Chicago.

During the Kennedy administration, Sargent Shriver tried to appoint Melby as the director of Peace Corps operations in Indonesia and Melby worked briefly training volunteers headed for Ceylon. The appointment was blocked without any clear explanation, likely by anti-communists in Congress. In 1964, Melby wrote to Secretary of State Dean Rusk describing a similar outcome when he was considered for two positions at George Washington University. Negotiations appeared final, but no offer came, "only evasion and vague apologies."

In 1966, Melby founded the department of political studies at Canada's University of Guelph, served as its first chairman for five years, and then continued as a professor. That same year, he joined a group of 198 scholars in a critique of U.S. policy toward China. It urged the admission of China to the United Nations, steps toward U.S. diplomatic recognition of China, the initiation of bilateral negotiations, and the trade of nonstrategic materials.

Melby and Hordern, who was then working for the National Science Foundation and unwilling to move to Canada, divorced in 1967. He later married Canadian Roxana Carrier.

In 1968 he published The Mandate of Heaven with a Canadian publisher after U.S. publishers turned him down. It was an expanded version of the diary he kept during his service in China, illustrated with photographs by Henri Cartier-Bresson. He dedicated the volume to Hellman. He presented an account that invited comparison with contemporary events in Vietnam. One reviewer summarized its depiction of U.S. policy as "a bumbling effort to achieve vague purposes through the instrumentality of the Nationalist regime."

He retired from teaching in 1978. In retirement, he co-edited a collection of the correspondence of Constantine Nabokov, a minor Russian diplomat, to American Donald W. Nesbit.

Melby died of a heart attack on December 18, 1992, in Guelph General Hospital, Guelph, Ontario, Canada. His third wife, Roxana Carrier Melby, survived him. His papers were deposited at the Harry S. Truman Library, which also holds an oral history based on interviews conducted with Melby in 1972.

A prize named for Melby, is awarded by the department of Political Science at the University of Guelph.

== Select works ==
- Looking Glass for Americans: A Study of the Foreign Students at the University of Pennsylvania, with Elinor K. Wolf (National Council on Asian Affairs, 1961)
- The Mandate of Heaven: Record of a Civil War, China 1945-49 (University of Toronto Press, 1968)
- "The Origins of the Cold War in China," in Lori Lyn Bogle, ed., The Cold War, Volume 1: Origins of the Cold War: The Great Historical Debate (Routledge, 2001), based on a paper read at the meeting of the American Historical Association, December 1967
- "Racial Policy and International Relations," Annals of the American Academy of Political and Social Science, vol. 304, March 1956, 132–6
- "Great Power Rivalry in East Asia," International Journal, vol. 26, no. 3, Summer 1971, 457–68
- "Maoism as a World Force," Annals of the American Academy of Political and Social Science, vol. 402, July 1972, 26–39
- "The Foreign Student in America," Orbis Quarterly, Journal of World Affairs, vol. 8, Spring 1964
